= List of University of San Francisco people =

This is a list of people associated with the University of San Francisco.

== University presidents ==
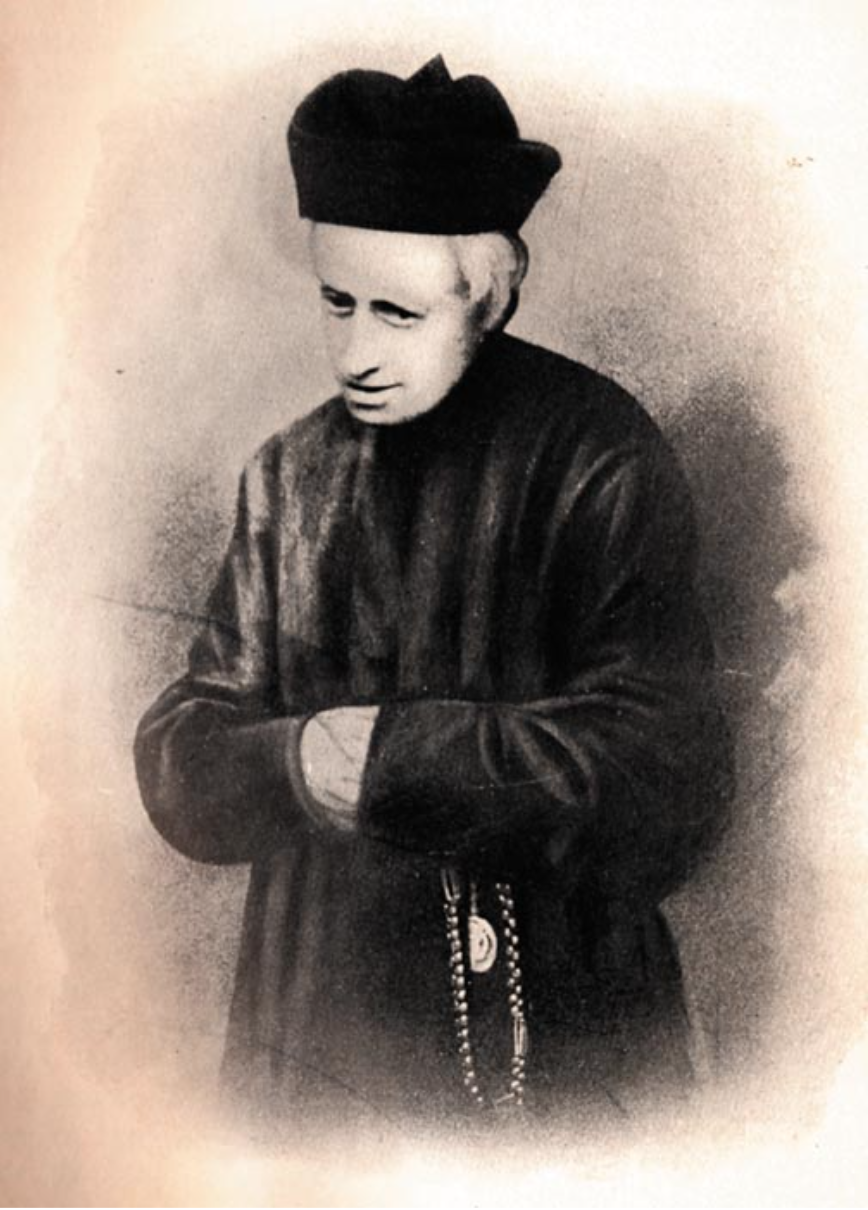
Fr. Anthony Maraschi, S.J. the founder and first president of the university

1. Anthony Maraschi, S.J. (1855–1862)
2. Nicholas Congiato, S.J. (1862–1865)
3. Burchard Villiger, S.J. (1865–1866)
4. Nicolas Congiato, S.J. (1866–1869)
5. Joseph Bayma, S.J. (1869–1873)
6. Aloysius Masnata, S.J. (1873–1876)
7. John Pinasco, S.J. (1876–1880)
8. Robert E. Kenna, S.J. (1880–1883)
9. Joseph C. Sasia, S.J. (1883–1887)
10. Henry Imoda, S.J. (1887–1893)
11. Edward P. Allen, S.J. (1893–1896)
12. John P. Frieden, S.J. (1896–1908)
13. Joseph C. Sasia, S.J. (1908–1911)
14. Albert F. Trivelli, S.J. (1911–1915)
15. Patrick J. Foote, S.J. (1915–1919)
16. Pius L. Moore, S.J. (1919–1925)
17. Edward J. Whelan, S.J. (1925–1932)
18. William I. Lonergan, S.J. (1932–1934)
19. Harold E. Ring, S.J. (1934–1938)
20. William J. Dunne, S.J. (1938–1954)
21. John F. X. Connolly, S.J. (1954–1963)
22. Charles W. Dullea, S.J. (1963–1969)
23. Albert R. Jonsen, S.J. (1969–1972)
24. William C. McInnes, S.J. (1973–1977)
25. John Lo Schiavo, S.J. (1977–1991)
26. John P. Schlegel, S J. (1991–2000)
27. Stephen A. Privett, S.J. (2000–2014)
28. Paul J. Fitzgerald, S.J. (2014–2024)
29. Salvador D. Aceves (2025-)

== Notable alumni ==
=== Academia ===
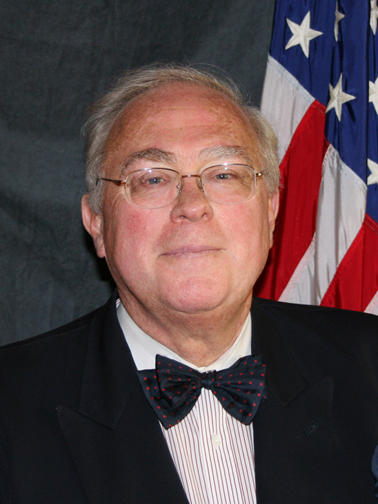
Kevin Starr

- Ifeoma Ajunwa, professor and legal scholar
- J. M. Beattie, legal historian
- Don Betz, academic administrator
- Dana R. Carney, professor of business and psychology
- Marshall Drummond, academic administrator
- Kevin Franklin, academic
- David Herlihy, medieval and renaissance historian
- Margaret Holtrust, political scientist
- Edward Imwinkelried, professor and legal scholar
- Andrew Jolivette, professor
- Dennis Kennedy, professor and author
- Linda Lambert, professor emeritus
- George Ledin, professor and computer scientist
- Lloyd Levitin, professor and businessman
- Tommie Lindsey, teacher
- Margaret McFall-Ngai, animal physiologist and biochemist
- Mark Miravalle, professor of theology
- Thomas Nazario, professor and attorney
- Michael A. Rice, professor of fisheries and aquaculture
- Kevin Starr, historian and State Librarian of California

=== Arts and entertainment ===
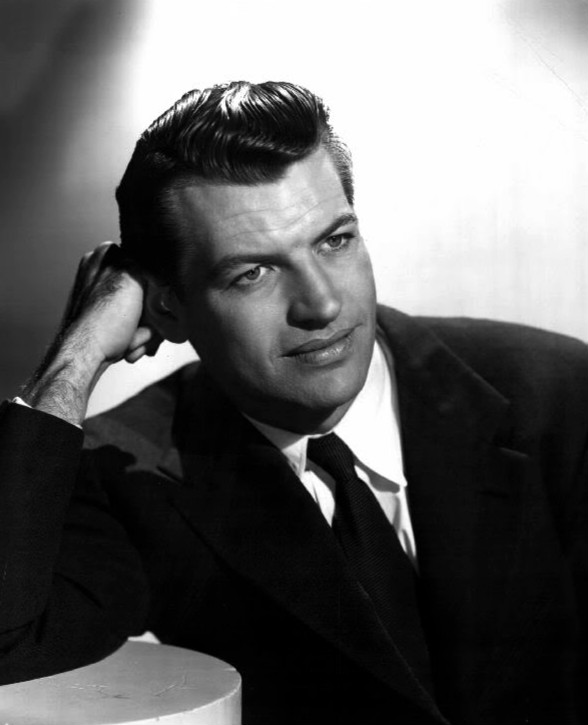
Richard Egan

- Pacita Abad, Filipino-American painter
- Carlos Baena, animator
- Ralph Barbieri, sports talk show host
- Craig Blais, poet
- John Brimhall, musician and author
- Cupcake Brown, author and lawyer
- Clint Catalyst, author and actor
- JuJu Chan, actress and martial artist
- George Cheung, actor and stuntman
- John Corcoran, speechwriter for the Governor of California and White House staffer
- Ito Curata, fashion designer
- Lou Dematteis, photographer and filmmaker
- Tomie dePaola, author and illustrator
- Michael Dickman, poet
- George Dohrmann, Pulitzer Prize-winning sports writer
- Dossie Easton, author
- Art Edwards, writer and musician
- Richard Egan, actor and Golden Globe winner
- Trinidad Escobar, author, poet, and cartoonist
- Michael Franti, musician and poet
- Hengameh Ghaziani, actress
- Patricia Giggans, writer and activist
- Jeff Gottesfeld, novelist and television writer
- Robert Joseph Greene, author
- Kimberly Guilfoyle, attorney and television personality
- John Haase, author and dentist
- Willyce Kim, writer
- John Anthony Lennon, musician and composer
- Al Madrigal, actor and comedian
- Judith Margolis, artist
- Joseph E. Marshall, author and activist
- Peter McGehee, writer
- Joshua Mohr, author
- Stan Musilek, commercial photographer
- David Paulides, investigator and writer
- Richard Poe, actor
- Jane Porter, author
- Rose Resnick, pianist and activist
- Michaela Roessner, writer
- Joe Rosenthal, Pulitzer Prize-winning photographer
- Charlie L. Russell, author and playwright
- Gini Graham Scott, author and songwriter
- Ty Segall, musician and producer
- Harri Sjöström, musician
- Suzanne Somers, television actress
- Joseph Stroud, poet
- Kelly Sueda, painter
- Rosana Sullivan, Pixar storyboard artist
- Teri Suzanne, artist and actress
- Paul Vangelisti, poet
- David Vann, writer
- Clare Vivier, fashion designer
- Sinqua Walls, actor
- Nicole Zaloumis, radio host

=== Athletics ===
==== Baseball ====
- Jim Begley, Major League Baseball player
- Tagg Bozied, Major League Baseball player
- Mike Buskey, Major League Baseball player
- Jake Caulfield, Major League Baseball player
- Adam Cimber, Major League Baseball player
- Jermaine Clark, Major League Baseball player
- Scott Cousins, Major League Baseball player
- Dustin Delucchi, Minor League Baseball player
- Con Dempsey, Major League Baseball player
- Clarence Fieber, Major League Baseball player
- Jesse Foppert, Major League Baseball player
- Joe Giannini, Major League Baseball player
- Jeff Harris, Major League Baseball player
- Stan Johnson, Major League Baseball player
- Jim Mangan, Major League Baseball player
- J.D. Martin, Major League Baseball player
- Windy McCall, Major League Baseball player
- Gil McDougald, Major League Baseball player
- Greg Moore, Major League Baseball player
- Alyssa Nakken, first female Major League Baseball coach
- Joe Nelson, Major League Baseball player
- Aaron Pointer, Major League Baseball player
- Aaron Poreda, Major League Baseball player
- Bill Renna, Major League Baseball player
- Paul Schramka, Major League Baseball player
- Neill Sheridan, Major League Baseball player
- Justin Speier, Major League Baseball player
- Ernie Sulik, Major League Baseball player
- Bradley Zimmer, Major League Baseball player
- Kyle Zimmer, Major League Baseball player

==== Basketball ====
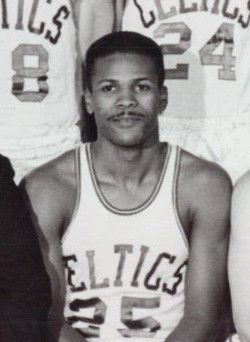
K.C. Jones

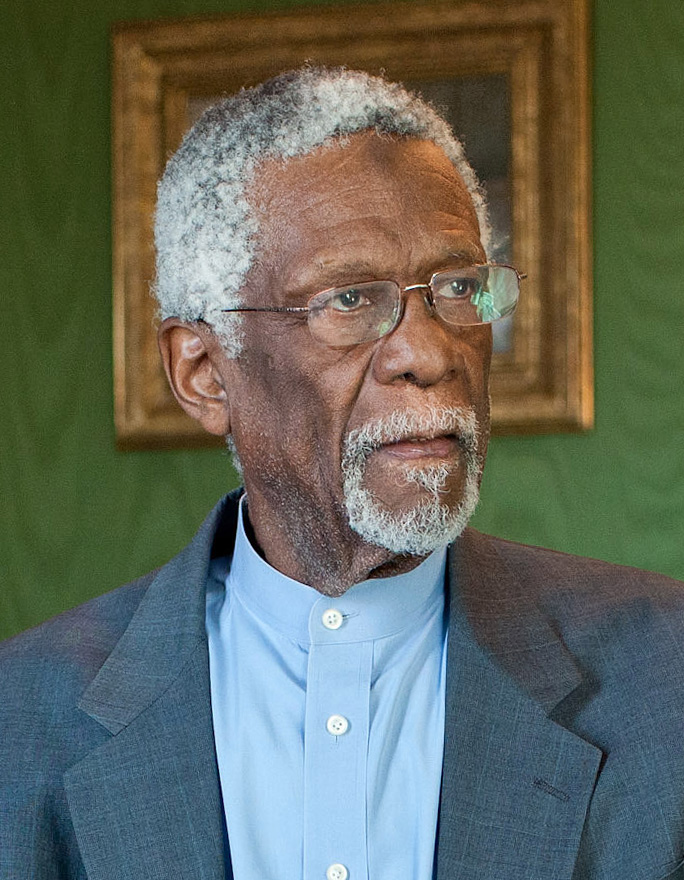
Bill Russell

- John Benington, college basketball player and coach
- Carl Boldt, college basketball player
- Jamaree Bouyea, college basketball player
- Winford Boynes, NBA player
- Jim Brovelli, college basketball player and coach
- Gene Brown, college basketball player
- Wallace Bryant, NBA player
- Angelo Caloiaro, Israeli Premier League and EuroLeague basketball player
- Damian Cantrell, professional basketball player
- Bill Cartwright, NBA player and head coach of the Chicago Bulls
- John Cox, EuroLeague basketball player and Olympian
- Pete Cross, NBA player
- Quintin Dailey, NBA player
- Moustapha Diarra, professional basketball player
- Cole Dickerson, professional basketball player in the Nemzeti Bajnokság I/A
- Joe Ellis, NBA player
- Mike Farmer, NBA player
- Eric Fernsten, NBA player
- Frankie Ferrari, professional basketball player
- Bob Gaillard, college basketball player and coach
- Todd Golden (born 1985), college and pro basketball player and current head coach of the Florida Gators men's basketball team
- James Hardy, NBA player
- Rene Herrerias, college basketball player and coach
- Russell Hinder, professional basketball player in the National Basketball League (Australia)
- Avry Holmes, professional basketball player
- Joy Hollingsworth, basketball player and coach
- Ollie Johnson, NBA player
- Byron Jones, NBA player
- K.C. Jones, NBA player, coach, and Basketball Hall of Famer
- Kenyon Jones, professional basketball player
- Fred LaCour, NBA player
- Dave Lee, American Basketball Association player
- Don Lofgran, NBA player
- Dior Lowhorn, professional basketball player
- Jimbo Lull, professional basketball player
- Matt McCarthy, professional basketball player
- Joe McNamee, American Basketball Association player
- Kevin Mouton, college basketball coach
- Erwin Mueller, NBA player
- Jerry Mullen, NBA player
- Paul Napolitano, NBA player
- Jimmy Needles, professional and Olympic basketball coach
- Hal Perry, college basketball player
- Mike Preaseau, college basketball player
- Manny Quezada, professional basketball player
- Marlon Redmond, NBA player
- Billy Reid, NBA player
- Kevin Restani, NBA player
- Bill Russell, NBA player, coach, and Basketball Hall of Famer
- Ross Giudice, player and coach
- Fred Scolari, NBA player
- Orlando Smart, professional basketball player
- Phil Smith, NBA player
- Shamell Stallworth, professional basketball player
- Rodney Tention, professional basketball coach
- Mark Tollefsen, Israeli Premier League basketball player
- Ime Udoka, NBA player and coach
- Kwame Vaughn, Liga Leumit basketball player
- Alan Wiggins Jr., professional basketball player
- Guy Williams, NBA player
- Marcus Williams, basketball player in the Israeli Basketball Premier League
- Mikey Williams, professional basketball player
- Andy Wolfe, college basketball player and attorney
- Willie "Woo Woo" Wong, professional basketball player

==== Football ====
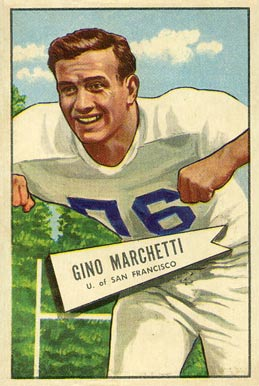
Gino Marchetti

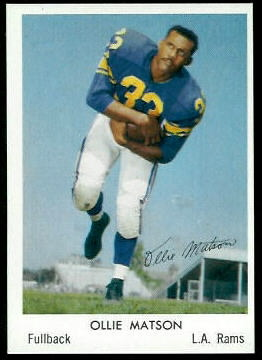
Ollie Matson

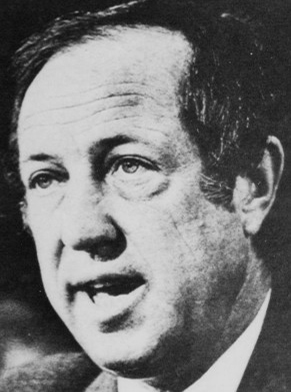
Pete Rozelle

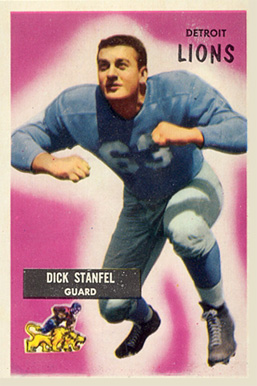
Dick Stanfel

- Ernie Barber, NFL player
- Jim Barber, NFL player
- Roy Barni, NFL player
- Ed Brown, NFL player
- George Buksar, NFL player
- Bill Dando, college football player and coach
- Mike Davlin, NFL player
- Mike Donohoe, NFL player
- Keith Dorney, NFL player
- Forrest Hall, professional football player
- Jeff Horton, football coach
- Russ Letlow, NFL player
- Gino Marchetti, NFL player and Pro Football Hall of Famer
- Ollie Matson, NFL player and Pro Football Hall of Famer
- Ken McAlister, NFL player
- Dave Olerich, NFL player
- Don Panciera, NFL player
- Ray Peterson, NFL player
- Harmon Rowe, NFL player
- Pete Rozelle, commissioner of the NFL (1960–1989) and Pro Football Hall of Famer
- John Sanchez, NFL player
- Joe Scott, NFL player
- Joe Scudero, NFL player
- Larry Siemering, NFL player
- Bob St. Clair, NFL player and Pro Football Hall of Famer
- Dick Stanfel, NFL player and Pro Football Hall of Famer
- Red Stephens, NFL player
- Ralph Thomas, NFL player
- Burl Toler, first African-American official in the NFL
- Vince Tringali, NFL player
- Carroll Vogelaar, NFL player

==== Soccer ====
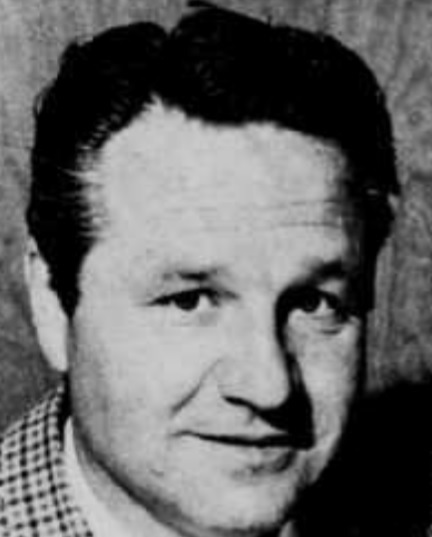
Stephen Negoesco

- Luis Aguilar, professional soccer player
- Miguel Aguilar, Major League Soccer player
- John Anton, professional soccer player
- Koulis Apostolidis, professional soccer player
- Peter Arnautoff, professional soccer player
- Hunter Ashworth, professional soccer player
- Andy Atuegbu, professional soccer player
- Marko Bedenikovic, professional soccer player
- Samantha Brand, professional soccer player
- John Brooks, professional soccer player
- Bryan Burke, professional soccer player
- Conor Chinn, Major League Soccer player
- Bjørn Dahl, soccer player and manager of SK Brann
- Troy Dayak, Major League Soccer player
- John Doyle, professional soccer player, Olympian, and general manager of the San Jose Earthquakes
- Tony Graham, professional soccer player
- Josh Hansen, professional soccer player
- Mike Ivanow, Major League Soccer player and Olympian
- Stephen Negoesco, professional soccer player and National Soccer Hall of Famer
- Brandon McDonald, Major League Soccer player
- Chris McDonald, professional soccer player
- Josh McKay, Major League Soccer player
- Greg McKeown, Major League Soccer player
- Lothar Osiander, Major League Soccer coach
- Fiona O'Sullivan, professional soccer player and coach
- Manny Padilla, professional soccer player
- Mal Roche, professional soccer player
- Chris Rodd, professional soccer player
- David Romney, Major League Soccer player
- Tyler Ruthven, professional soccer player
- Lou Sagastume, professional soccer player and coach
- Madalyn Schiffel, professional soccer player
- Nathan Simeon, college soccer player
- Joshua Smith, professional soccer player
- Autumn Smithers, professional soccer player
- Ståle Søbye, professional soccer player
- Leticia Torres, professional soccer player
- Bjørn Tronstad, professional soccer player
- Rob Valentino, Major League Soccer player
- Glenn van Straatum, professional soccer player
- Tim Weaver, Major League Soccer player
- Marquis White, Major League Soccer player
- Camille Wilson, professional soccer player
- Yue Yixing, professional soccer player

==== Tennis ====
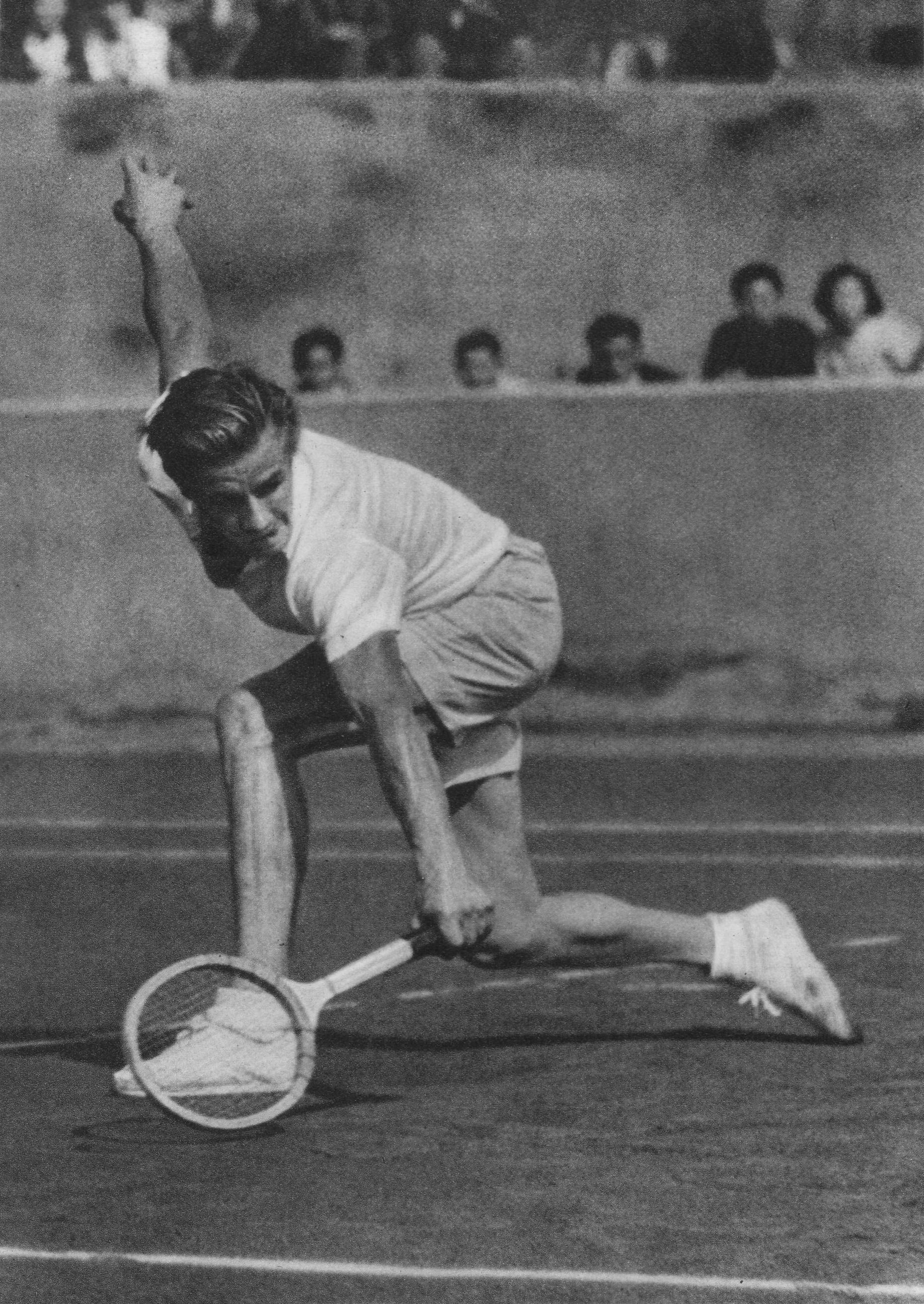
Art Larsen

- Peanut Louie Harper, professional tennis player
- Art Larsen, professional tennis player and International Tennis Hall of Famer
- Harry Likas, professional tennis player
- Sam Match, professional tennis player

==== Other ====
- Todd Fischer, professional golfer
- Dean Karnazes, ultra-marathon runner
- Mariya Koroleva, synchronized swimmer and Olympian
- Tatiana Lysenko, gymnast and Olympian, 2-time gold medal winner
- Marcus McElhenney, rower and Olympian
- Haley Nemra, track athlete and Olympian
- Juliet Starrett, two-time whitewater rafting world champion and businesswoman
- Charlotte Taylor, long-distance runner
- Maor Tiyouri, Israeli Olympic marathoner
- Inbar Vinarsky, Israeli volleyball player
- John Witchel, NCAA and Pac-10 swimming champion, entrepreneur

=== Business ===
- Segun Agbaje, banker and director of Guaranty Trust Bank
- Jerry Baldwin, co-founder of Starbucks and Redhook Ale Brewery
- Jean-Charles Boisset, vinter and proprietor of the Boisset Collection
- Gordon Bowker, co-founder of Starbucks and Redhook Ale Brewery
- Caleb Chan, businessman and philanthropist
- Alfred Chuang, founder and CEO of BEA Systems
- Patricia Cloherty, businesswoman and financier
- Chung Eui-sun, executive chairman and CEO of Hyundai Motor Group
- Jon Fisher, technology entrepreneur, investor, and inventor
- Byington Ford, real estate developer
- Gordon Getty, businessman and philanthropist
- John Paul Getty Jr. (did not graduate), philanthropist
- William Randolph Hearst II, businessman
- Hekani Jakhalu Kense, social entrepreneur and lawyer
- Lloyd Levitin, businessman and professor
- Jim Long, businessman and music industry entrepreneur
- Andrey Muravyov, businessman and entrepreneur
- Ron Najafi, pharmaceutical entrepreneur
- Paul Otellini, president and CEO of Intel
- Ruth Parasol, businesswoman and entrepreneur
- Angelo Sangiacomo (1924–2015), real estate developer
- Marjorie Scardino, businesswoman
- Weijian Shan, economist and businessman
- Zev Siegl, co-founder of Starbucks and Redhook Ale Brewery
- Lip-Bu Tan, CEO of Intel
- John Witchel, businessman and two-time Pan American Games swimming gold medalist
- Dave Yeske, financial planner and professor

=== Government and politics ===
==== Members of Congress ====
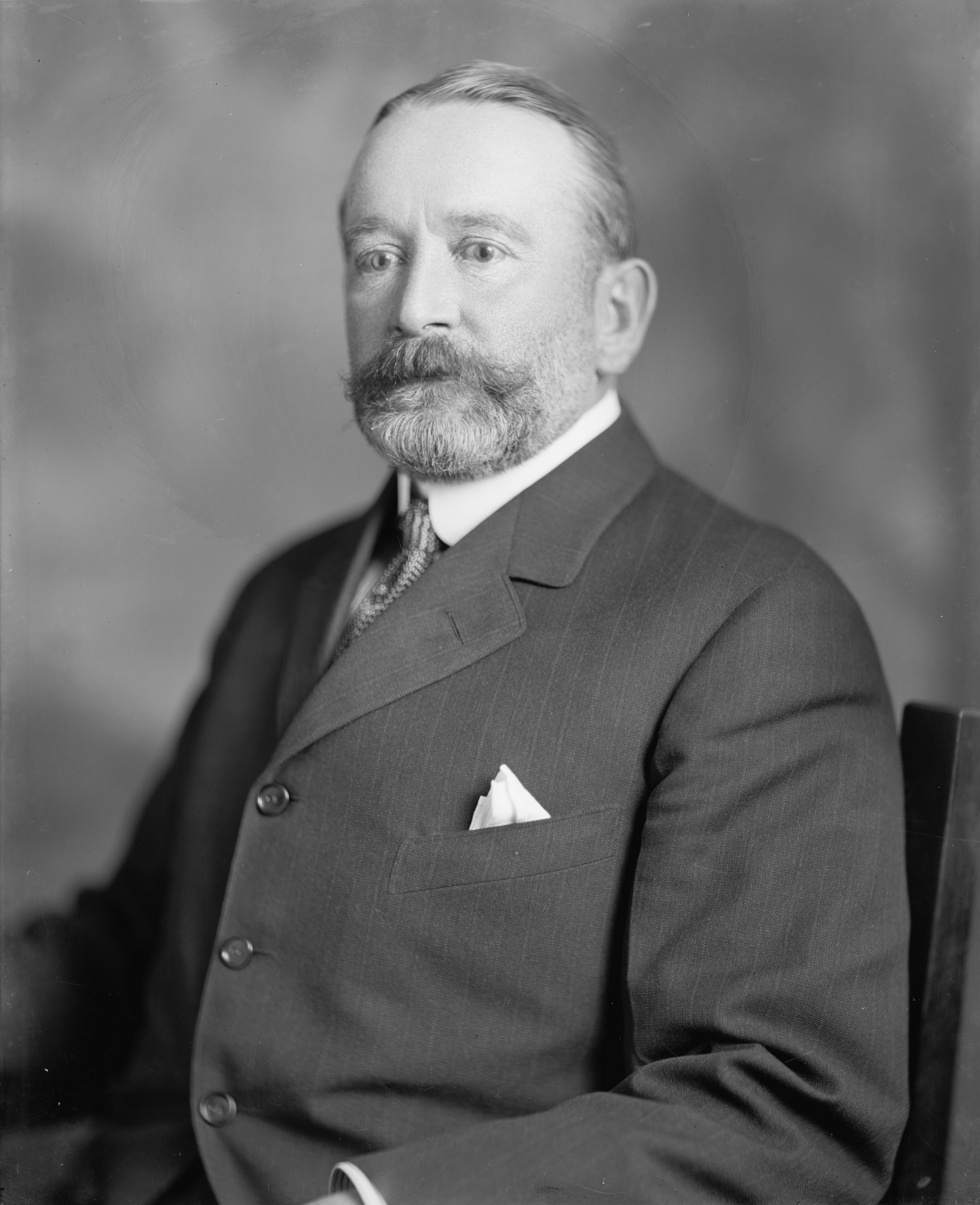
James D. Phelan

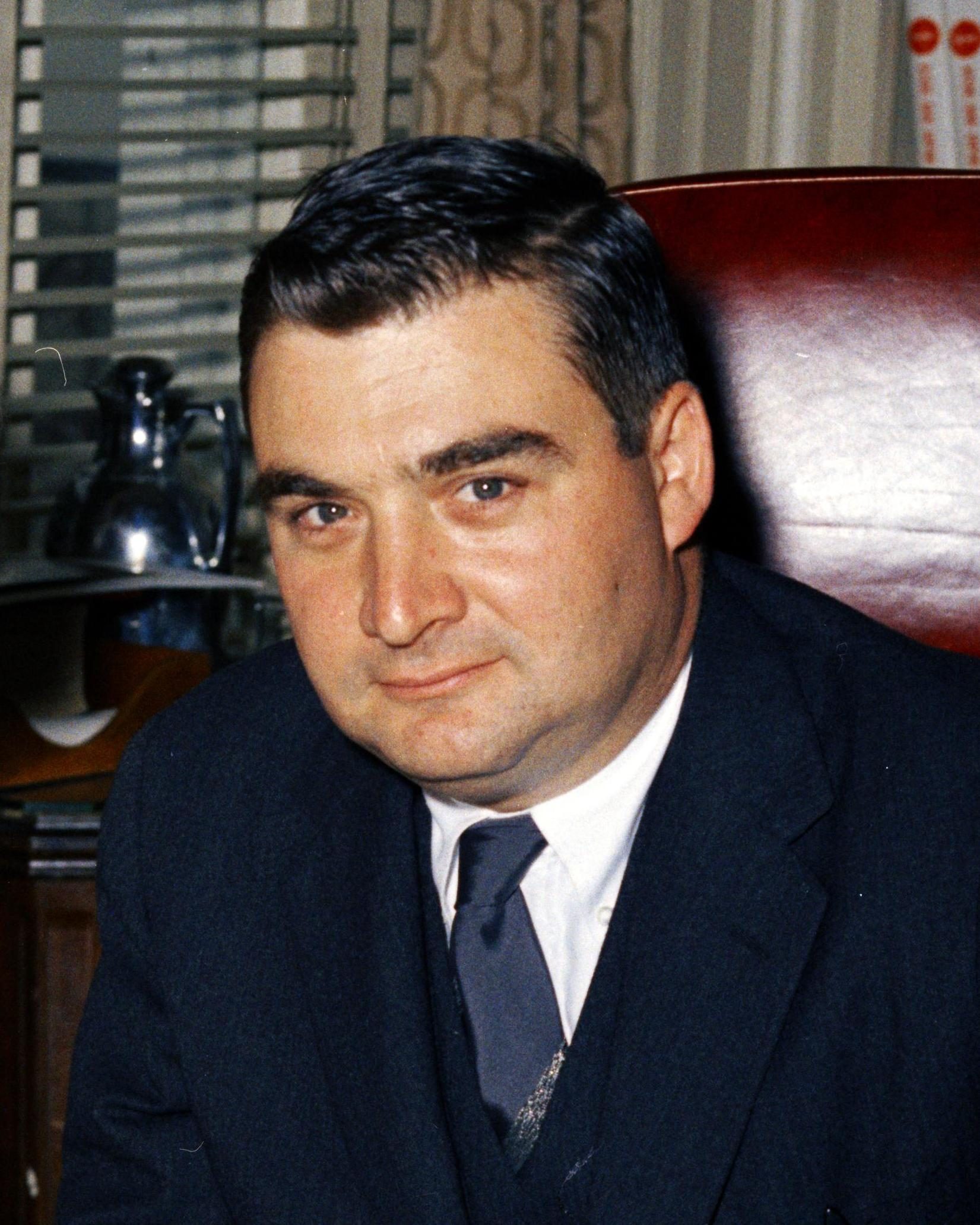
Pierre Salinger

- John Burton, member of the United States House of Representatives (1974–1983), California State Assembly (1965–1974; 1988–1996); California State Senate (1996–2004); chair of the California Democratic Party (1973–1974; 2009–2017)
- Sala Burton, member of the United States House of Representatives (1983–1987)
- John E. Cunningham, member of the United States House of Representatives (1977–1979), Washington Senate (1975–1977), and Washington House of Representatives (1973–1975)
- Kevin Mullin, member of the United States House of Representatives (2023–present), Speaker pro tempore and member of the California State Assembly (2012–2022)
- James D. Phelan, United States senator for California (1915–1921) and mayor of San Francisco (1897–1902)
- Pierre Salinger, United States senator for California (1964) and White House Press Secretary (1961–1964)
- John F. Shelley, member of the United States House of Representatives (1949–1969), California Senate (1939–1947), and mayor of San Francisco (1964–1968)
- Lateefah Simon, member of the United States House of Representatives (2025–present)
- Lynn Woolsey, member of the United States House of Representatives (1993–2013)

==== Members of state and territorial legislatures ====
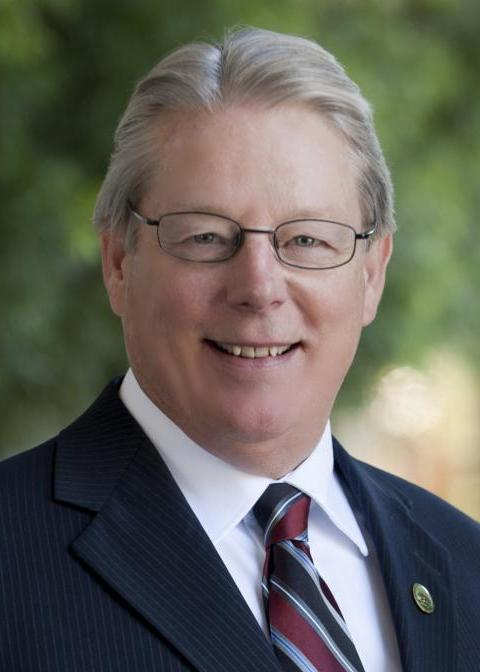
Bill Monning

- Katherine B. Aguon, senator of the Guam Legislature (1977–1979)
- Wesley Chesbro, member of the California State Assembly (2008–2014) and California State Senate (1998–2006)
- Bill Duplissea, member of the California State Assembly (1986–1988)
- Paul Fong, member of the California State Assembly (2008–2014)
- Mary Hayashi, member of the California State Assembly (2006–2012)
- Randy Iwase, member of the Hawaii Senate (1990–2000)
- Susan C. Lee, member of the Maryland House of Delegates (2002–2015) and Maryland Senate (2015–present)
- Sylvia Luke, member of the Hawaii House of Representatives (1999–present)
- J. Eugene McAteer, member of the California Senate (1959–1967)
- John F. McCarthy, member of the California Senate (1950–1971)
- Robert I. McCarthy, member of the California Senate (1955–1959) and California State Assembly (1949–1953)
- Bill Monning, member of the California State Assembly (2008–2012) and California Senate (2012–2020)
- Gene Mullin, member of the California State Assembly (2002–2008) and mayor of South San Francisco (1997–1998; 2001–2002)
- Frank S. Petersen, member of the California Senate (1963–1967) and judge on the Del Norte County Superior Court (1966–1988)
- Julia Ratti, member of the Nevada Senate (2016–2021)
- Michael A. Rice, member of the Rhode Island House of Representatives (2009–2011)
- Don Sebastiani, member of the California State Assembly (1980–1986)

==== State and territorial executive offices ====
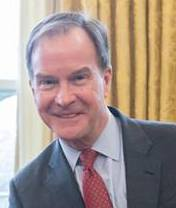
Bill Schuette

- Elizabeth Barrett-Anderson, attorney general of Guam (2015–2019)
- Ricardo Bordallo, governor of Guam (1975–1979; 1983–1987)
- Ron Knecht, Nevada state controller (2015–2019) and member of the Nevada Assembly (2002–2004)
- Thomas C. Lynch, attorney general of California (1964–1971) and district attorney of San Francisco (1951–1964)
- Leo T. McCarthy, lieutenant governor of California (1983–1995)
- John Mockler, California secretary of education (2000–2002)
- Bill Schuette, Attorney General of Michigan (2011–2019), member of the United States House of Representatives (1985–1991), state legislator, and justice of the Michigan Court of Appeals
- Faoa Aitofele Sunia, lieutenant governor of American Samoa (2003–2013)

==== Municipal and local offices ====
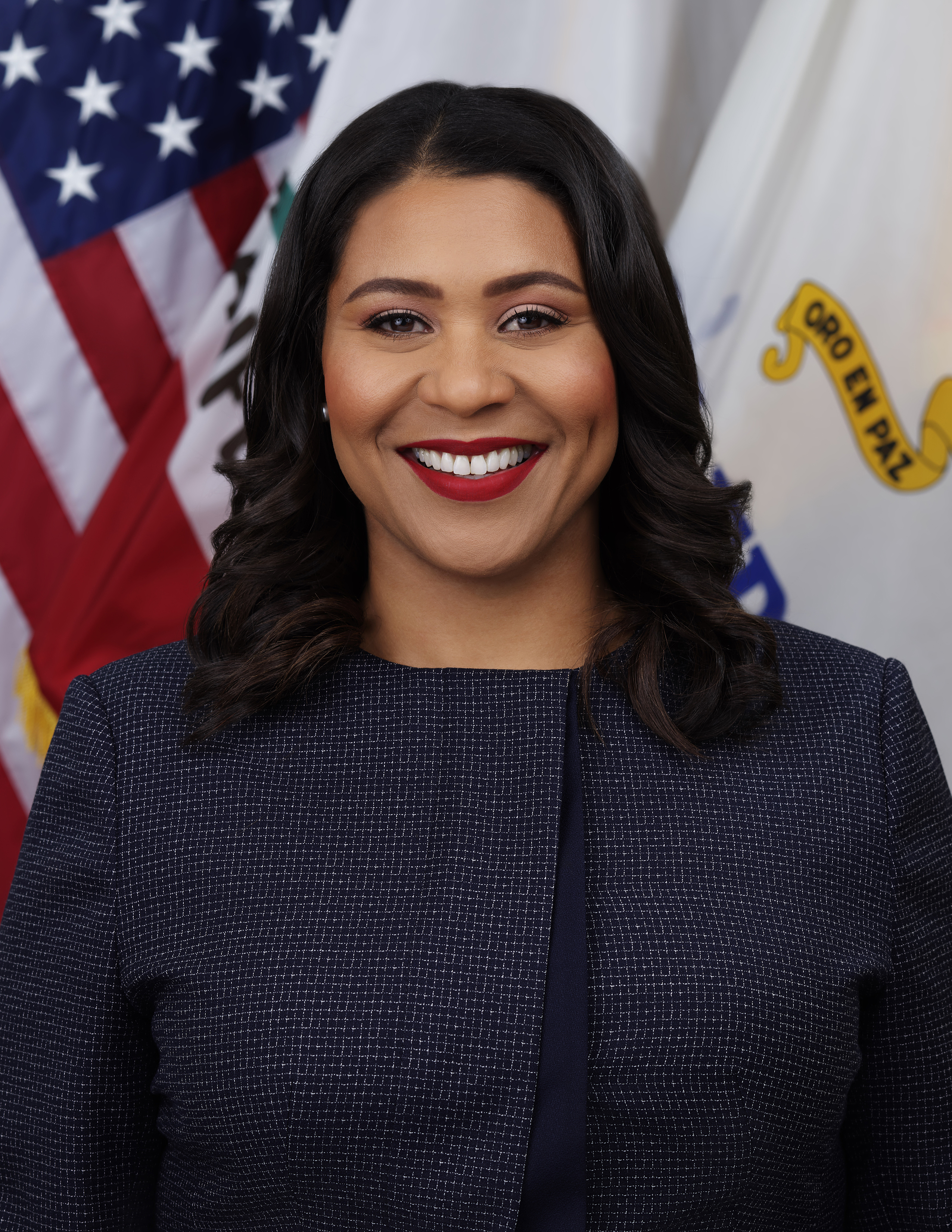
London Breed

- Angela Alioto, member and president of the San Francisco Board of Supervisors (1989–1997)
- London Breed, mayor of San Francisco (2018–2025)
- Robert Coleman-Senghor, mayor of Cotati, California (2010–2011) and professor
- Preet Didbal, mayor of Yuba City, California (2014–2018)
- John C. Houlihan, mayor of Oakland (1961–1966)
- Frank Jordan, mayor of San Francisco (1992–1996) and chief of the San Francisco Police Department (1986–1990)
- Dan Kalb, member of the Oakland City Council (2013–present)
- Suzy Loftus, interim District Attorney of San Francisco (2019–2020)
- Carlos Menchaca, member of the New York City Council (2014–2021)
- John E. Manders, mayor of Anchorage (1945–1946)
- Mike Nevin, mayor and city councilman of Daly City, California (1982–1989), member of the San Mateo County Board of Supervisors
- Katy Tang, member of the San Francisco Board of Supervisors (2013–2019)
- Joseph E. Tinney, member of the San Francisco Board of Supervisors (1961–1966) and San Francisco City Assessor (1966–1979)
- Brendon Woods, public defender of Alameda County, California (2012–present)

==== Diplomatic offices ====
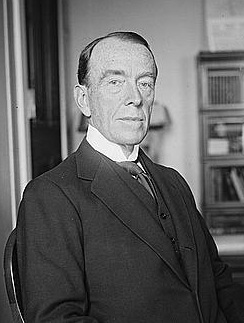
Richard M. Tobin

- Robert F. Kane, U.S. ambassador to Ireland (1984–1985) and Justice of the California Court of Appeals (1971–1979)
- Richard Morefield, diplomat and American consul general to Iran during the Iran hostage crisis
- Richard M. Tobin, banker and U.S. ambassador to the Netherlands (1923–1929)

==== International offices ====
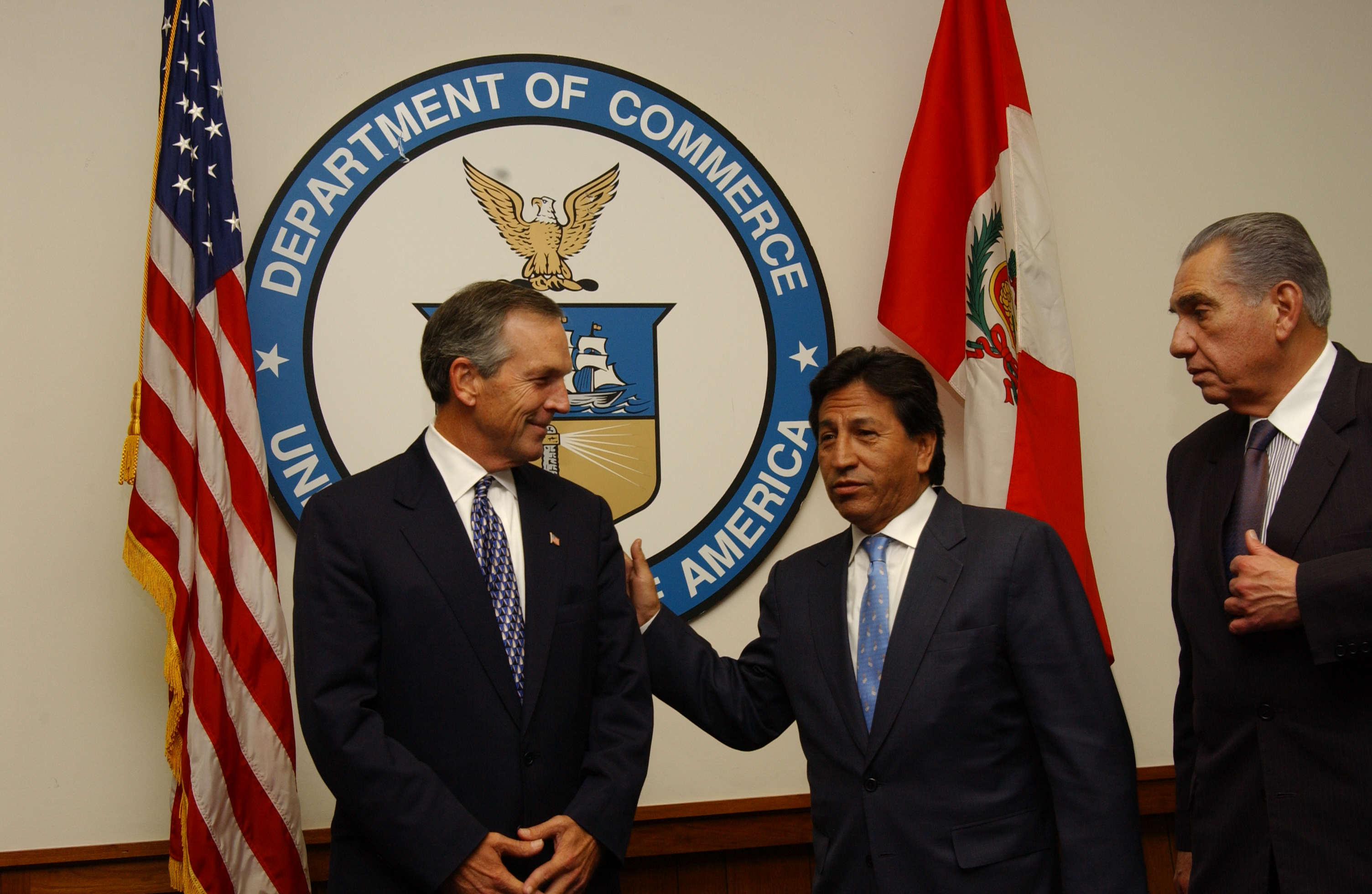
Alejandro Toledo

- Mahnaz Afkhami (born 1941), Iranian-American politician and human rights and women's rights activist, served in the Cabinet of Iran (1976–78)
- Iggy Arroyo, member of the House of Representatives of the Philippines (2004–2012)
- Alfred Chen, businessman and member of the Legislative Yuan of Taiwan (2004–2005)
- Jason Kenney (did not graduate), premier of Alberta (2019–2022)
- Alejandro Toledo, president of Peru (2001–2006)
- Hsiao Uan-u, member of the Legislative Yuan of Taiwan (1999–2002)
- You Hwai-yin, member of the Legislative Yuan of Taiwan (1993–2001)

==== Other governmental offices and titles ====
- John F. Blake, Deputy Director of the Central Intelligence Agency (1977–1978)
- Mary Brownel, Liberian peace activist
- Joann G. Camacho, First Lady of Guam (2003–2011)
- Martha Kanter, United States Under Secretary of Education (2009–2013)
- Arthur Ohnimus, Chief Clerk of the California State Assembly (1923–1937; 1941–1963)
- James G. Smyth, Chief Clerk of the California State Assembly (1937–1939)
- Eric Ueland, government official and political advisor

=== Journalism ===
- Warren Brown, sportswriter
- Emily Compagno, political commentator and attorney
- Delia Gallagher, CNN journalist
- Moira Gunn, academic, radio host, and journalist
- Warren Hinckle, political journalist
- Jennifer Jolly, Emmy Award-winning journalist
- Vicky Nguyen, NBC News journalist
- James Raser, radio producer and sportscaster
- Dick Spotswood, columnist
- Allen Wastler, financial journalist
- Olivier Weber, writer, journalist, and war correspondent

=== Law and justice ===
==== Judges ====
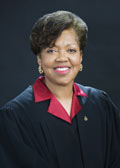
Saundra Brown Armstrong

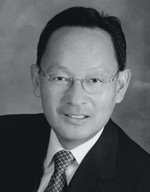
Ming Chin

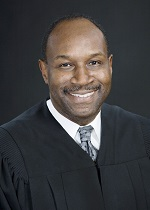
Martin Jenkins

- Saundra Brown Armstrong, judge on the United States District Court for the Northern District of California (1991–present)
- Ming Chin, justice of the Supreme Court of California (1996–2020) and California Court of Appeal (1990–1996)
- Daniel Foley, judge of the Hawaii Intermediate Court of Appeals and associate justice of the Supreme Court of Palau
- Roger D. Foley, judge and chief judge of the United States District Court for the District of Nevada (1962–1996) and attorney general of Nevada (1959–1962)
- Harold Haley, judge on the Marin County Superior Court (1965–1970) and victim of the Marin County Civic Center attacks (1970)
- George Bernard Harris, justice and chief judge of the United States District Court for the Northern District of California (1946–1983)
- Martin Jenkins, justice of the Supreme Court of California (2020–present) and California Court of Appeal (2008–2019)
- Buell A. Nesbett, first chief justice of the Alaska Supreme Court (1959–1970)
- William Newsom, justice of the California Court of Appeal (1978–1995)
- Edward Joseph Schwartz, judge and chief judge of the United States District Court for the Southern District of California (1968–2000)
- Jeremiah F. Sullivan, justice of the Supreme Court of California (1926–1927)
- Matt Sullivan, chief Justice of the Supreme Court of California (1914–1915)
- Raymond L. Sullivan, justice of the Supreme Court of California (1966–1977) and California Court of Appeal (1961–1966)
- William Thomas Sweigert, judge of the United States District Court for the Northern District of California (1973–1983)
- Mary Jane Theis, justice of the Illinois Supreme Court (2010–present) and Illinois Appellate Court (1993–2010)
- Gary W. Thomas, judge on the Marin County Superior Court (1986–1998)
- Dorothy von Beroldingen, judge on the San Francisco County Superior Court (1977–1999) and member of the San Francisco Board of Supervisors (1966–1977)
- James Ward, justice of the California Courts of Appeal (1996–present)

==== Law enforcement ====
- Heather Fong, chief of the San Francisco Police Department (2004–2009)
- Michael Hennessey, sheriff of San Francisco (1980–2012)
- Ross Mirkarimi, sheriff of San Francisco (2012–2016)
- Danielle Outlaw, Philadelphia police commissioner (2020–present) and chief of the Portland Police Bureau (2017–2019)
- William J. Quinn, chief of the San Francisco Police Department (1929–1940)

==== Other legal figures ====
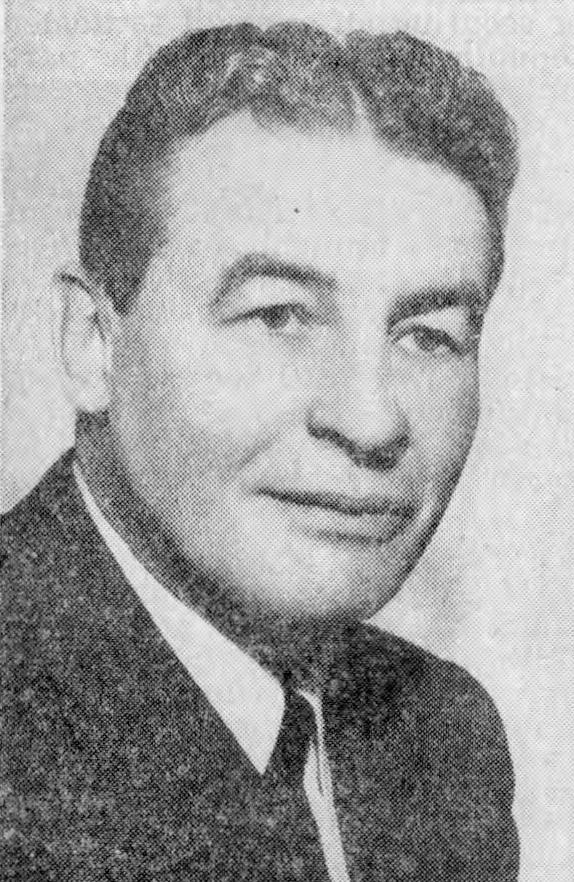
Vincent Hallinan

- Lina Abu Akleh, human rights advocate
- Tom Asimou, attorney
- Thomas Anthony Durkin, attorney
- Vincent Hallinan, attorney and Progressive Party candidate in the 1952 United States presidential election
- Hekani Jakhalu, attorney and social entrepreneur
- Geneviéve Jones-Wright, defense attorney
- Frederick J. Kenney, Judge Advocate General of the United States Coast Guard (2011–2014)
- Jay Leiderman, attorney
- Mark Massara, attorney and conservationist
- Kevin V. Ryan, United States Attorney for the Northern District of California (2002–2007)
- Patricia A. Shiu, director of the Federal Contract Compliance (2009–2016)
- Chan Chung Wing, first Chinese-American attorney in California

=== Military ===
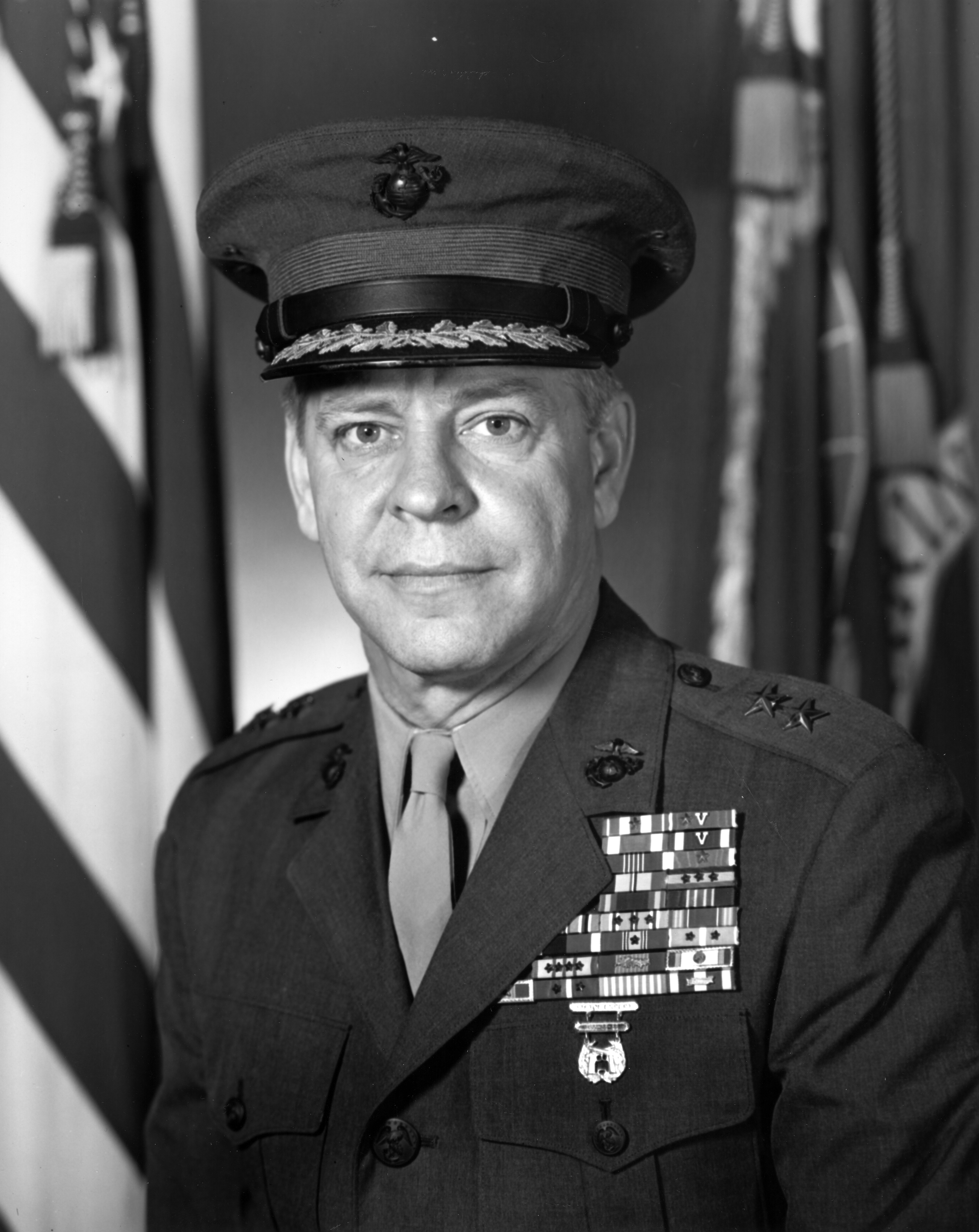
Robert D. Bohn

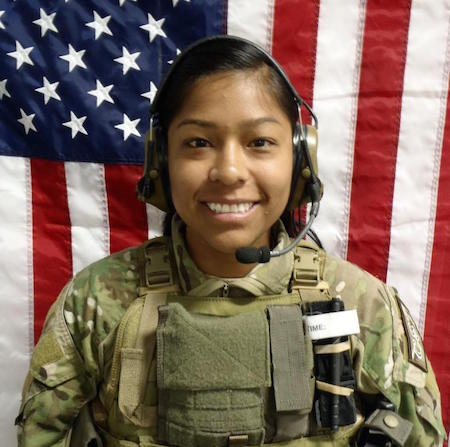
Jennifer Moreno

- Leven Cooper Allen, major general of the United States Army
- Robert D. Bohn, major general of the United States Marine Corps
- Kenneth J. Houghton, major general of the United States Marine Corps
- Kenneth McLennan, general of the United States Marine Corps
- Jennifer Moreno, decorated United States Army nurse captain

=== Religious figures and clergy ===
Kyrill Dmitrieff

- Tod Brown, bishop of Orange (1998–2012) and bishop of Boise (1989–1998)
- Charles J. Chaput, archbishop of Philadelphia (2011–2020), archbishop of Denver (1997–2011), and bishop of Rapid City (1988–1997)
- Thomas Anthony Daly, bishop of Spokane (2017–present)
- Kyrill Dmitrieff, Orthodox archbishop of San Francisco and Western America (2000–present)
- Francis P. Filice, Roman Catholic priest and professor at the University of San Francisco
- Gino Geraci, pastor and radio host
- William J. Justice, auxiliary bishop of San Francisco (2008–2017)
- Steven J. Lopes, bishop of the Personal Ordinariate of the Chair of Saint Peter (2016–present)
- Chad Ripperger, Catholic priest and theologian
- John Charles Wester, archbishop of Santa Fe (2015–present) and bishop of Salt Lake City (2007–2015)

=== Royalty and nobility ===
- Prince Edouard-Xavier de Lobkowicz (1960–1984), French military officer and murder victim
- Prince Alexander of Yugoslavia, Serbian prince

=== Science, technology, and medicine ===
- Luis Felipe Baptista, ornithologist
- Augustus Jesse Bowie Jr., inventor and electricity innovator
- Sunney Chan, biophysical chemist
- Dan Dugan, inventor and audio engineer
- Christopher Erhardt, video game designer and educator
- John Joseph Montgomery, physicist and inventor specializing in aviation
- Kathi Mooney, professor and cancer specialist
- Bruce Ogilvie, sports psychologist
- Tatjana Piotrowski, geneticist
- Michael A. Rice, fisheries scientist
- Janese Swanson, inventor and software developer
- Francis Xavier Williams, entomologist

== Faculty ==
- Alma Flor Ada, professor of education; author
- Shalanda Baker, professor of law
- Micah Ballard, professor of writing; poet
- Ari Banias, professor of writing; poet
- David Batstone, professor of business; author, theologian, and activist
- Lara Bazelon, professor of law
- Stephen Beachy, professor of writing
- Catherine Brady, professor of writing; author
- Winfried Brugger, professor of law; author and philosopher
- Paul Chien, professor of biology
- Michael Chorost, professor of rhetoric and composition
- Jasmin Darznik, professor of writing; author
- Sergio De La Torre, professor of photography and film
- Peter Masten Dunne, professor of history
- John H. Elliott, professor of theology; Biblical scholar
- Moshé Feldenkrais, professor of education; engineer and physicist
- Francis P. Filice, professor of biology; Roman Catholic priest and activist
- Jon Fisher, professor of business; entrepreneur and author
- Arthur Furst, professor of medicinal chemistry and pharmacology
- Edna Garabedian, professor of voice; opera mezzo-soprano
- Guillermo García Oropeza, professor of literature and architecture
- Sam Green, professor of film; documentary filmmaker
- Moira Gunn, professor of biotechnology; journalist
- Oren Harari, professor of business; author
- Maya Harris, professor of law
- Andrew R. Heinze, professor of history; playwright and author
- Patricia Liggins Hill, professor of English, 1st director of Ethnic Studies program
- Jane Hirshfield, professor of poetry; poet
- Vamsee Juluri, professor of media studies
- Deneb Karentz, professor of biology
- Edward L. Kessel, professor of biology
- Laleh Khadivi, professor writing; novelist and filmmaker
- Herbert R. Kohl, professor of education
- Michael Kudlick, professor of computer science
- Art Lande, professor of music
- Emille D. Lawrence, professor of mathematics and statistics
- Jerzy Jan Lerski, professor of political science and history
- Madeleine Lim, professor of film studies; activist
- W. Michael Mathes, professor of history
- J. Thomas McCarthy, professor of law
- Ruthanne Lum McCunn, professor of literature and writing; author
- Jake McGoldrick, professor of English; member of the San Francisco Board of Supervisors (2001–2008)
- Kirke Mechem, professor of music and composer-in-residence
- Donald Merrifield, professor of physics; Roman Catholic priest and university administrator
- Patrick J. Miller, professor of computer science
- Rusty Morrison, professor of poetry; poet
- Margaret Morse, professor of film and video arts
- Joseph Nation, professor of economics; member of the California State Assembly (2000–2006)
- Thomas Nazario, professor of law
- Elliot Neaman, professor of history
- Tristan Needham, professor of mathematics
- Michael O'Neill, professor of management
- Robert T. Orr, professor of zoology and biology
- John Jay Osborn Jr., professor of contract law
- Terence Parr, professor of computer science
- Eva Paterson, professor of public interest and civil rights law
- John A. Powell, professor of law
- Dean Rader, professor of English; poet
- William Ratliff, professor of foreign policy and history
- Barbara Jane Reyes, professor of Filipino studies
- David Roderick, professor of writing; poet
- John Rothmann, professor of politics; radio host
- James V. Schall, professor of theology and philosophy; Roman Catholic priest
- Dan Schutte, professor of music and composer-in-residence
- Aaron Shurin, professor of writing; poet
- Carol Ruth Silver, professor of public policy; member of the San Francisco Board of Supervisors (1978–1989)
- Jessica Snow, professor of art; artist
- K.M. Soehnlein, professor of writing
- Kevin Starr, professor of history; historian and State Librarian of California
- Susan Steinberg, professor of English; author
- John Stillwell, professor of mathematics
- Jeremiah F. Sullivan, professor of law; Justice of the California Supreme Court (1926–1927)
- Rachel Thomas, professor of technology and data ethics
- John B. Tsu, professor of East Asian studies
- Leo Valledor, professor of art
- Andrew Vázsonyi, professor of business
- Heinz Weihrich, professor of global management and administration
- Kathryn Werdegar, professor of law; Justice of the Supreme Court of California (1994–2017)
- Nicole Wong, professor of media and internet law; Deputy Chief Technology Officer of the United States (2013–2014)
- Paul Zeitz, professor of mathematics
- Rose Zimbardo, professor of English literature
- Stephen Zunes, professor of politics

=== Administrators and staff ===
- Robert L. Niehoff, associate provost and vice president for Planning and Budgeting; Roman Catholic priest
- Glori Simmons, director of the Thacher Gallery; poet
- Matt Sullivan, professor and first dean of the School of Law (1912–1937); chief justice of the Supreme Court of California (1914–1915)
- John D. Trasviña, dean of the School of Law (2013–2018) and Assistant Secretary of the Office of Fair Housing and Equal Opportunity (2009–2013)

== Honorary degrees ==
Recipients of USF honorary degrees include the following:

- September 2003 – Dalai Lama, the 14th Dalai Lama, was awarded an honorary doctoral degree from USF on September 5, 2003, for his lifelong work in promoting peace and compassion, and helping to bring about a more humane world.
- December 2004 – Gloria Macapagal Arroyo, Philippine president
- April 2005 – Kim Dae-jung, former president of South Korea and 2000 Nobel Peace Prize winner who helped lead his country's movement toward democratic rule
- 2005 – Terry Karl, professor of Latin American Studies at Stanford University, Doctor of Humane Letters, honoris causa, as a result of her human rights work
- May 2005 – Shirin Ebadi, Iranian human rights activist
- May 2006 – Richard Blum, founder and chairman of the Himalayan Foundation
- May 2006 – Gloria Duffy, CEO of the Commonwealth Club of California
- May 2006 – Michael Tilson Thomas, music director of the San Francisco Symphony
- May 2007 – Leo T. McCarthy (posthumous honorary degree)
- December 2007 – the Reverend Glenda Hope, founder of Network Ministries. She embodies cultural service that respects the individual dignity of every person, most notably the poor, the homeless, prostitutes, and those living with HIV/AIDS in San Francisco's Tenderloin neighborhood.
- December 2007 – Sayadaw U Kovida, on behalf of the Buddhist monks of Burma. The monks were honored for their courage in rising up in peaceful protest against their country's oppressive military regime. Their actions reflect the university's mission to educate leaders who will fashion a more humane and just world.
- December 2007 – Gerald McKevitt, S.J., Santa Clara University history professor and university historian. McKevitt is renowned for his knowledge of Jesuit history in California and the West, and received an honorary degree for his dedication to teaching, scholarship, and service to the university community.
- September 2008 – Greg Mortenson, co-author of Three Cups of Tea; executive director of the Central Asia Institute
- December 2008 – Mary McAleese, president of Ireland

Other recipients of honorary degrees include Nobel Peace Prize laureate Shirin Ebadi, journalist Helen Thomas, and the late South African activist Stephen Biko.
