= You (surname) =

- Romanization: You, Yu (Mandarin); Jau, Yau (Cantonese)
- Language: Chinese

Origin
- Language: Old Chinese

You (Mandarin pronunciation: [iɤʊ]) is the pinyin romanization of several Chinese family names including 尤 Yóu, 游 Yóu, 㳺 Yóu, 犹 Yóu, 由 Yóu, 右 Yòu, 幽 Yōu, etc. Among these names, 尤 Yóu and 游 Yóu are relatively common. 尤 Yóu is the 19th surname in Hundred Family Surnames.

In Wade–Giles romanization system, You is spelled as Yu. Notable people with one of these surnames include:

== Yóu 尤 ==
It is the 19th name on the Hundred Family Surnames poem.

- You Ching (born 1942), Taiwanese diplomat
- You Quan (born 1954), Chinese politician, former Communist Party Secretary of Fujian province
- You Yong (born 1963), Chinese actor
- You Wenhui (born 1979), Chinese volleyball player
- You Meihong (born 1993), Chinese swimmer
- You Zhangjing (born 1994), Malaysian singer and songwriter, former member of Nine Percent
- You Xiaodi (born 1996), Chinese tennis player
- Yu Ming-shi, Administrative Deputy Minister of Coast Guard Administration of the Republic of China

== Yóu 游 ==
- You Benchang (1933–2026), Chinese actor
- You Hwai-yin (born 1942), Taiwanese banker and Kuomintang politician
- You Si-kun (born 1948), Taiwanese Democratic Progressive Party politician
- Yu An-shun (born 1967), Taiwanese actor
- Chris Yu (born 1968, Taiwanese singer
- Charles Yu (born 1976), American writer of Taiwanese descent
- Martino Yu (born 1977), Taiwanese artist
- Yew Jia Haur (游佳豪; born 1978), Malaysian politician
- Kelvin Yu (born 1979), American actor of Taiwanese descent

== Yóu 由 ==
- You Xigui (born 1939), People's Liberation Army general
- You Yuanwen (born 1986), Chinese football striker and midfielder

== You: other or unknown ==
- You Bo, Khmer writer and the president of the Khmer Writers' Association
- You Bong-hyung (born 1970), South Korean fencer
- Carson Huey You (born 2002), American student, youngest person to ever receive a bachelor's degree from Texas Christian University
- You Chung Hong (1898–1977), American attorney and community leader
- Dominique You (1775–1830), French privateer
- You Hockry (born 1944), Cambodian politician
- Lum You (1861–1902), Chinese man convicted of murder in the Pacific Northwest
