= Greg McKeown =

Greg McKeown may refer to:

- Greg McKeown (author), British business writer
- Greg McKeown (soccer), American soccer player
