= NovaBay Pharmaceuticals =

Biopharmaceutical company

NovaBay Pharmaceuticals, Inc.
- Company type: Public
- Traded as: AMEX: NBY; Russell Microcap Index component
- Founded: 2000
- Founder: Ron Najafi
- Headquarters: United States
- Key people: Mark Sieczkarek, M.B.A., CEO and Chairman of BOD; John (“Jack”) McGovern, CFO; Tom Paulson, M.B.A., Strategic Planning; Lewis J. Stuart, M.B.A., Chief Commercial Officer (CCO); Glenn Moro, VP, Marketing Avenova; Justin M. Hall, Esq, Senior Vice President, General Counsel; Greg Miller, Director, Strategic Sales
- Website: novabay.com

NovaBay Pharmaceuticals, Inc. is an Emeryville, California based clinical-stage biopharmaceutical company, focused on products for eye care. Major products include Avenova, cleared by FDA for lid and lash cleansing as part of a regimen for Blepharitis. and NeutroPhase, used in treatment of Necrotizing Fasciitis

== History ==
NovaBay Pharmaceuticals, Inc. was founded in 2000 by Ron Najafi to create a stable version of HOCl. Najafi, chemistry Nobel laureate Herbert C. Brown, and Purdue University Professor Dale Margerum recruited Dr. Lu Wang to become NovaBay's Director of Product Development. She developed the stable version of pure hypochlorous acid, without bleach impurities, which became NovaBay's first product, NeutroPhase.

NovaBay later launched additional products named CelleRx™ for Plastic Surgery and i-Lid™ Cleanser (Now Avenova) that was cleared by FDA for lid and lash cleansing as part of a regimen for Blepharitis.
