= Call and Response: The Riverside Anthology of the African American Literary Tradition =

1997 anthology

- Author: Patricia Liggins Hill (general editor), Bernard W. Bell (editor), Trudier Harris (editor), William J. Harris (editor), R. Baxter Miller (editor), Sondra A. O'Neale (editor)
- Language: English
- Subject: African American literature
- Genre: Anthology
- Publisher: Houghton Mifflin Company
- Publication date: April 1997 (1st edition)
- Publication place: United States
- Media type: Hardcover, paperback, Audio CD, CD-ROM
- Pages: 2,039
- ISBN: 978-0-395-88404-1 (1st edition hardcover)
- OCLC: 37276956
- Dewey Decimal: 810.8/0896073 21
- LC Class: PS508.N3 C56 1998

Call and Response: The Riverside Anthology of the African American Literary Tradition is a compilation of literary and cultural works that originated from call and response patterns in African and African-American cultural traditions. The 1997 anthology includes works representing the centuries-long emergence of this distinctly Black literary and cultural aesthetic in fiction, poetry, drama, essays, sermons, speeches, criticism, journals, and song lyrics from spirituals to rap. Writings ranging from Queen Latifah to Phyllis Wheatley and LeRoi Jones are included within this volume. This anthology asserts that these various artistic forms comprise a Black aesthetic.

The anthology, published by the Houghton Mifflin Company, organizes its selections around three themes: the pattern of call and response, the journey toward freedom, and major historical events in the African-American experience. The anthology editors have woven together selections, critical analysis of the texts, historical background, and biographies into a scholarly, unified, and chronological approach to African-American literature and culture. Patricia Liggins Hill of the University of San Francisco served as general editor of the anthology.
