= Francis P. Filice =

American biologist & priest (1922–2015)

- Born: August 19, 1922; Hollister, California
- Died: July 17, 2015 (aged 92); San Rafael, California
- Education: University of San Francisco, University of California, Berkeley
- Known for: ecology of marine invertebrates, support for Right to life
- Spouse: Barbara Ann Fate (m. 1947; d. 11 Feb. 1976)
- Scientific career
- Fields: Parasitology, Marine ecology
- Workplaces: University of San Francisco

Francesco Pasqual Filice (August 19, 1922 – July 17, 2015) was an American priest of the Archdiocese of San Francisco. Filice was a professor of biology at the University of San Francisco (1947–1976), founder of United for Life of San Francisco (1968), co-founder of the St. Ignatius Institute (1976), co-founder of Priests for Life (1991), and founder of the Holy Family Oratory of St. Philip Neri.

== Ancestry ==
Filice's father, the elder Francesco Filice, descended, on his father's side, from a tribe of shepherds in what is now the Calabria province of Southern Italy. Filice theorizes that his father's family were Jews who took refuge in Southern Italy after the fall of Jerusalem in A.D. 70.

Filice's grandmothers were Rafaella Fortino and Nicolina Pascuzzi, both of whose families descended from the mountain peoples of Celtic descent in Southern Italy. These tribes descend from the Boii, a Celtic people that specialized in cattle raising and filled up the Apennines in Roman times.

The name "Filice" is theorized to be either a form of the word for "fern" in the Southern Italian dialect (in which case, the accent should be on the first 'i') or a corruption of the Latin word for "happy", which is "felix". Both Filice and Joseph G. Fucilla, in his book Our Italian Surnames, support the latter theory. In later years, Fr. Filice would tell his friends that his name meant, "pure Easter joy."

The Filice Family, into which Fr. Filice would be born, went to the United States from Rogliano, a small town near Cosenza in Calabria. After spending some time in the state of Washington, they settled in Gilroy and Hollister, agriculturally-oriented cities south of San Francisco, near San Jose. In Gilroy and Hollister, they owned various types of orchards.

== Early life ==
Filice was born in Hollister, California on August 19, 1922. He was the firstborn son of Francesco and Antonia (Antoinette) Filice. The elder Francesco Filice died before his son's birth. Filice's birth certificate lists his name as "Franciesco Pasquale Patricio Filice" (sic), while his baptismal certificate reads "Francesco Pasqual Filice" (sic).

Filice grew up on Judah Street in San Francisco's inner Sunset District, but he also spent much of his childhood with his cousins in Gilroy and Hollister. When he was a young boy, his widowed mother married Francis Garofalo, a barber in San Francisco. They had one daughter, Gloria Garofalo Pizzinelli. Mrs. Pizzinelli inhabits the family home on Judah Street to this day and has three children of her own, as well as ten grandchildren.

Filice graduated from St. Anne of the Sunset Catholic School in 1935. He attended Polytechnic High School, and then the Christian Brothers' Sacred Heart High School, where he distinguished himself academically.

== Education ==
In 1939, Filice enrolled at the University of San Francisco - San Francisco's Jesuit university - where he took the Bachelor of Science in 1943. In 1945, he earned the Master of Science degree at the University of California, Berkeley. In 1949, he earned the Ph.D., also at Berkeley. He published his doctoral dissertation Studies on the Cytology and Life History of a Giardia From the Laboratory Rat (Berkeley: University of California Press) in 1952.

== Academic career ==
In 1947, Filice accepted a position as professor of biology at the University of San Francisco, where he would teach for almost 30 years.

Among Filice's scholarly work in the field of parasitology was a study based upon his doctoral research to characterize the life cycle of the medically significant parasite causing Giardiasis.

- Filice F.P. 1952. Studies on the cytology and life history of a Giardia from the laboratory rat. U.C. Publications in Zoology 57(2):53-146 University of California Press: Berkeley.

In the early 1950s, Filice and co-workers investigated levels of amino acids in the body tissues of various marine invertebrates including seastars, sea urchins and spoon worms. They were the first to demonstrate that various marine invertebrates maintain high concentrations of amino acids in their tissues in comparison to vertebrate animals.

- Giordano, M.F., H.A. Harper and F.P. Filice. 1950. The amino acids of the blood of Urechis caupo. Wasmann J. Biol. 8(1):1-7.
- Giordano, M.F., H.A. Harper and F.P. Filice. 1950. The amino acids of a starfish and a sea urchin (Asteroidea and Echinoidea). Wasmann J. Biol. 8(2):129-132.

Later in that decade, Filice embarked on a scientific expedition to Baja California, and he was a leader in the "Save The Bay" organization and movement in San Francisco, which sought to deter City planners from filling in the San Francisco Bay in order to increase development of the Bay Area. In this respect, he published three significant studies in the field of marine ecology:

- Filice, F.P., 1954. An ecological study of the Castro Creek area of San Pablo Bay. Wasmann J. Biol. 12(1):1-24.
- Filice, F.P., 1958. Invertebrates from the estuarine portion of San Francisco Bay and some of the factors influencing their distribution. Wasmann J. Biol. 16:159-211.
- Filice, F.P., 1959. The effects of wastes on the distribution of bottom invertebrates in San Francisco Bay estuary. Wasmann J. Biol. 17:1-17.

== Pro-Life Activism ==
Also central to his work as a professor of biology was anti-abortion activism and the defense of unborn human life.

Prior to the late 1960s, abortion was illegal in every state of the United States, except in cases where the pregnancy posed a risk to the mother's life. This changed in 1967 when Colorado became the first state to legalize abortion in cases of rape, incest, or when there was a threat of permanent disability to the pregnant women. During this period, when the topic of overpopulation first became widely discussed, Filice recalls that not a month would pass when he did not receive, as a biology professor at USF, a free copy of a textbook which called into question population growth. The first such book was The Population Bomb. Dr. Filice found the arguments made in such books unconvincing and began to speak against them at various meetings.

At this time, Filice was invited to participate in a panel discussing concerns over population at a local high school, by a former student of his who was teaching biology. In his observation, the speakers affiliated with Planned Parenthood and the representative of the Human Population Institute of Stanford only talked about how to get an abortion, without addressing the population question at all. This concerned Filice, and, as a result, he called the chancery of the Archdiocese of San Francisco to ask what they were doing to respond. Finding out that they did not have a plan for action, Filice asked if they minded if he tried something. The Chancellor of the Archdiocese told him to go ahead.

Filice had a student, John Martin, who had become a Lutheran, and, when Filice expressed his concern about how things were developing, this student told him that his pastor had expressed the same concerns. As a result, he invited his pastor to have lunch with Filice at USF. Pastor Kangas was pastor of the Finnish Lutheran Church of St. Francis on Church Street in San Francisco. Pastor Kangas was from Ohio. Filice found him to be a very spiritual man.

Filice also invited to the lunch meeting Eileen Ziomeck (now Dr. Aicardi, a pediatrician in San Francisco), who, in Filice's words, was "smartest student I ever had". The four people who attended the luncheon decided to start an educational group aimed at countering the claims regarding population growth made in the media.

Pastor Kangas knew an Episcopalian minister who was of the same mind. He was Rev. Charles Carroll, chaplain at UCSF and pastor of the church that is now the Catholic chapel of St. John of God. Rev. Carroll had been a Catholic, at one time, but now served under the Episcopalian Bishop of San Francisco. His presence on the committee added a socially upscale quality to the movement.

So the four contacted Rev. Carroll and called a meeting. St. Mary's Hospital let them use a meeting room. No doctors were at the meeting. Those in attendance at this first meeting were: Filice, Eileen Ziomeck, John Martin, John Galten, Clayton Barbeau (a Catholic author), Rev. Bernie Bush, S.J., Rev. Theodore Taheny, S.J., Rev. Carroll, Pastor Kangas, Bob Augros (a philosophy professor at USF), and others whom Filice cannot remember. He does remember that there were fourteen people present.

They decided that the political problem was impractical to address directly, and that what was needed was an educational group to counter the arguments of the pro-choice movement. Filice remembers going around the room and asking each if they wanted to be chairman, but each of them declined. So, by default, Filice became the chairman of this emergent anti-abortion group in San Francisco. Thus was born United for Life of San Francisco.

United for Life met every two weeks for the next seven years. At their first official meeting, Dr. Raymond Dennehy came up from Santa Clara University, where he taught philosophy. Dr. Augros and he took the task of countering the arguments of their opposition, and they developed a pamphlet in question-and-answer form that became the source of arguments against abortion for all the anti-abortion groups in the United States. This pamphlet was later the basis of a book by Dr. Jack and Barbara Willke from Ohio.

United for Life developed the first anti-abortion newsletter in the United States and contacted all the groups in California and the United States. In most densely populated areas, ad hoc groups formed. For example, across the bay in Oakland, "Voice of the Unborn" was formed by a number of housewives. In Los Angeles, a right-to-life organization was formed by a group of doctors' wives. There was a network of such groups who brought information to their legislatures and to young people.

In addition, United for Life developed speakers bureaus: lawyers, scientists, students, and women who went to every school in the Bay Area to present the anti-abortion message. They purchased films which explored prenatal development. They asked to address every event in the Bay Area where their opposition would be.

United for Life organized the opposition to the bills in the California State Assembly to strike down all the abortion laws, and they "defeated it handsomely."

Mary Ann Schwab and Alice Austurias, members of United for Life, organized the Catholic Office for Life in the Archdiocese of San Francisco and staffed it for many years. Some of the members of United for Life organized the Political Action organization in California as a separate organization because of the tax laws.

The Birthright organization was started in San Francisco by Dr. Filice's second-oldest daughter, Carol Brown. A similar organization with the same name had been started in Toronto, Ontario. Brown and her helpers contacted the Toronto office, and they joined with the international organization. This helped the spread of Birthright offices on the West Coast.

Of Roe v. Wade, Filice has stated: "A purely fabricated case went to the Supreme Court and Justice Blackmun, without shame, wrote a majority opinion that is a masterpiece of false logic. The Court struck down all the laws protecting the child. In doing so they threw our legal system into a shambles. To this day, the effects are felt in the grossly unjust decisions made by the courts to protect the capacity to kill the child in the womb".

Filice finds noteworthy that the anti-abortion effort was the first effort by Catholic lay people in the United States without the help of the clergy; it was an entirely lay movement, the first, in Filice's experience, in the United States where the people acted without the leadership of their pastors. This was important because the Catholic organizers wanted non-Catholics to join in. Their conviction was that abortion is a human problem and not just a religious one. The early anti-abortion activists felt that they, as citizens, had to educate the voters in the United States. As a result, many Catholic priests felt that it was not their fight. All that has changed by now, Fr. Filice points out: Priests for Life grew out of United for Life.

== Personal life ==
In 1947, Filice married Barbara Ann Fate, the daughter of Michael and Blanche Fate. Michael Fate was half Italian and half Irish, and Blanche Fate was half Irish and half Swedish. Ms. Fate had earned a baccalaureate degree at Lone Mountain College in San Francisco.

Filice had six children. The Filice Family would settle on 24th Avenue in San Francisco's Richmond District, attending St. Monica's parish and school. Filice's daughters attended Presentation High School, while his sons attended St. Ignatius, San Francisco's Jesuit high school.

In the early 1960s, Filice participated in one of the first cursillo retreats given in San Francisco, and he became a Third Order Carmelite. In 1964, he took his family on a pilgrimage to the Shrine of Our Lady of Guadalupe in Mexico City. From the early 1960s to the middle 1970s, Filice was involved with the St. Vincent de Paul Society and the anti-abortion movement.

Mrs. Filice died from complications related to kidney failure on February 11, 1976. Soon after, Dr. Filice retired from his professorship at the University of San Francisco and was accepted by Archbishop Joseph Thomas McGucken as a seminarian of the Archdiocese of San Francisco. From 1977 to 1979, he was engaged in formation for the priesthood at St. Patrick's Seminary in Menlo Park, CA. He was ordained a priest of Jesus Christ on May 19, 1979 at St. Mary's Cathedral in San Francisco. The ordaining prelate was Archbishop John R. Quinn of San Francisco.

Filice served as a parochial vicar in various parishes of the Archdiocese of San Francisco until 1986, when, with the permission of Archbishop Quinn, he established the Holy Family Oratory of St. Philip Neri in the Archdiocese of San Francisco. The impetus for the foundation of the Oratory was an awareness of the attacks on the family in the West, which had taken deep root in the culture. Fr. Filice sought to combat these evils by engaging in a sustained and organized apostolic service to the family in the context of the Oratorian life. In addition, he saw the common life of the Oratory as a healthy form of community life for secular priests engaged in pastoral ministry. The Oratory had pastoral care of the students of San Francisco State University until 1991, when it transferred its operations to the parish of San Jose de la Mesa in Tijuana, Mexico. Fr. Filice served there until 1996, when Archbishop William Levada called him home to the Archdiocese of San Francisco. Fr. Filice was assigned to be chaplain of the Veterans Administration Hospital in San Francisco. He served in that capacity until his retirement in the early 2000s.

Filice then resided in San Francisco as senior priest in residence at St. Thomas the Apostle Church in the outer Richmond District. He also served as full-time chaplain to the Sisters of Perpetual Adoration at 771 Ashbury Street in San Francisco. He was also part-time chaplain at the San Francisco County Jail, the Richmond Jail, and the San Bruno Jail, and at the Novitiate of Blessed Teresa of Calcutta's Missionaries of Charity, at St. Paul's on Church Street in the Noe Valley neighborhood of the Mission District.

Filice died on July 17, 2015, at Nazareth House in San Rafael surrounded by many of his family members. He was 92 years of age and until recent months had remained quite active in his ministry since his ordination in 1979.
