= Kathi Mooney =

American scientist

Kathleen B. Mooney
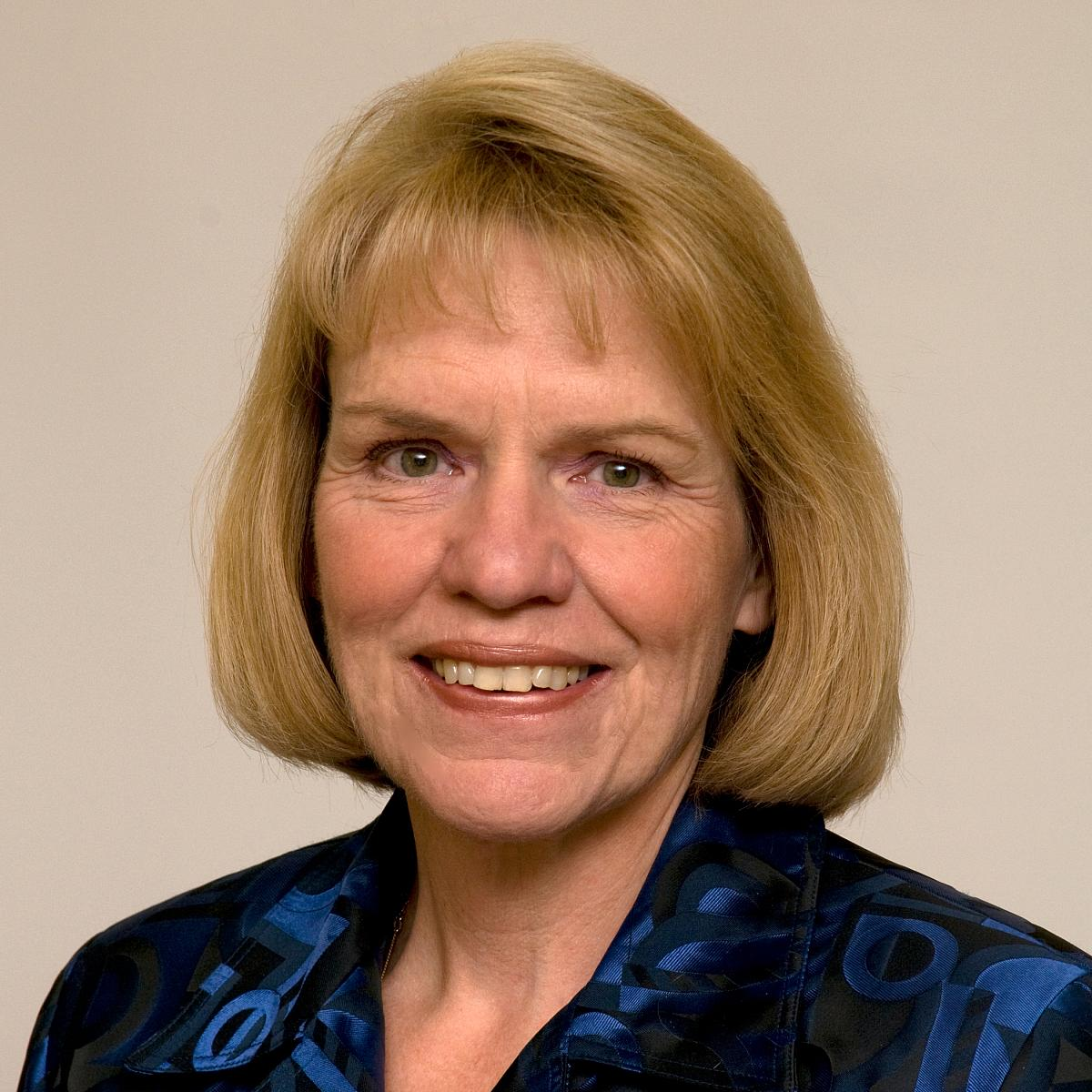

Co-Leader, Cancer Control & Population Sciences Huntsman Cancer Institute

Personal details
- Education: University of San Francisco (B.S.N.); University of Washington (M.N.); University of Utah (Ph.D.)
- Profession: Cancer Scientist

Kathleen B. Mooney is an American scientist, currently the Louis S. Peery and Janet B. Peery Presidential Endowed Chair in Nursing and Distinguished Professor of Nursing at the University of Utah. She is one of two co-leaders of the Cancer Control and Population Sciences Program at the Huntsman Cancer Institute. Her research focuses on palliative care symptom management for cancer patients and their family caregivers, clinical cancer outcomes, and technology aided interventions and telehealth.

== Education & Career ==
Mooney received a Bachelor of Science in Nursing from the University of San Francisco and a Master of Nursing from the University of Washington, followed by a Doctorate of Philosophy in Health Education from the University of Utah. In May 2013, Mooney was promoted to the rank of distinguished professor in the College of Nursing at the University of Utah. Along with Susan Beck, Mooney created Symptom Care at Home (SCH), an automated, telephone-based system for monitoring symptoms of patients and their family caregivers SCH tracks symptom trends and immediately provides customized advice to patient and caregivers, while simultaneously sending reports to healthcare providers when symptoms exceed specified severity thresholds or have increased for a preset number of consecutive days, with the goal of managing symptoms before they come too severe to control easily. In 2016, Mooney met with Vice President Joe Biden as part of his Cancer Breakthroughs 2020 listening tour.

Mooney is the recipient of numerous awards, including appointment as an American Cancer Society Professor of Oncology Nursing, both the Distinguished Service Award and Distinguished Researcher Award from the Oncology Nursing Society, and the Pioneer Award from the Utah Hospice Organization.
