= Kelly Sueda =

American painter

Untitled, oil on canvas painting by Kelly Sueda, 1996, Honolulu Museum of Art

Kelly Sueda (born 1972) is a painter who was born and raised in Hawaii. He received a BFA from the Academy of Art College in San Francisco and the University of San Francisco. He has shown his paintings in both solo and group shows in Hawaii and on the mainland. Kelly Sueda lives and works in Hawaii, and his work is in the collection of the Honolulu Museum of Art.
