= Peter Masten Dunne =

American historian

Peter Masten Dunne (1889–1957) was an American historian of the 17th- and 18th-century Jesuit missions of northwestern New Spain.

== Biography ==
Dunne was born in San Jose, California on April 16, 1889, and educated at Santa Clara College and at a seminary in Hastings, U.K. After his ordination in 1921, he served as an editor of the Jesuit magazine America in 1924–25. He taught at Santa Clara University between 1925 and 1930. In 1934, he received his Ph.D. degree from the University of California with a dissertation on "The Four Rivers: Early Jesuit Missions on the Pacific Coast", prepared under the direction of Herbert Eugene Bolton. From 1931 to 1957 he served in the University of San Francisco's history department. He died in San Francisco on January 15, 1957.

Dunne's scholarly writings included books and articles on a variety of historical subjects. His most notable contributions were four volumes detailing the history of the Jesuit missions in northwestern New Spain, including portions of the modern Mexican states of Sinaloa, Sonora, Chihuahua, Baja California Sur, and Baja California. The accounts were romanticized, strongly sympathetic with the Jesuit mission enterprise but somewhat disparaging of native societies and cultures.
