= Arthur Furst =

American-born toxicologist and cancer researcher (1914-2005)

Arthur Furst (December 25, 1914 – December 1, 2005) was an American born toxicologist and cancer researcher. He was involved in the creation of the Cancer Chemotherapy Laboratory at Stanford Medical School.

== Early life and education ==
He was born in Minneapolis, and orphaned at the age of four. He earned an A.A. in Psychology at City College of Los Angeles. Later he transferred to UCLA, where he earned an A.B. in Chemistry (1937) with minors in mathematics, physics, and psychology, and an M.A. in Chemistry (1940) with minors in mathematics and education. He received his Ph.D. from Stanford in 1948.

He married Florence Wolovith in 1940. They had four children.

== Career ==
Shortly after graduation from UCLA, Arthur took a teaching position at San Francisco City College. He taught chemistry and related classes at SFCC for seven years before accepting a full-time Assistant Professorship at USF in 1947.

In 1952, Furst left USF to join the emerging cancer research program at the Stanford University Medical School, taking the position of Associate Professor of Pharmacology & Therapeutics (Medicinal Chemistry). The idea of using specific chemicals in medical treatment was beginning to draw a great deal of attention within the cancer research community. By 1953, he made a presentation on the subject to the American Chemical Society and received his first research grant from the American Cancer Society.

In 1954, Furst was a keynote speaker at Stanford on the American Cancer Society’s National Tour of Cancer Research Centers. Furst’s work was showing that extracts from plants could be modified in ways so that they became cancer fighters. Developing more than 200 variants of these compounds, he found that some were very effective at killing off specific cancer cells.

In 1956 he presented before the Argonne National Laboratories Division of Biological and Medical Research, international conferences on Medicinal Chemistry, as well as being an invited lecturer at Harvard’s Children’s Cancer Research Foundation with cancer specialist Dr. Sidney Farber.

In 1957, Dr. Furst was promoted to Full Professor of Medicinal Chemistry at Stanford and received research grant from the US Public Health Service for his Cancer Chemotherapy Program.

In 1958, he presented a new discovery called "Mineral Chelation".

In 1960, Furst and his team at the Stanford Cancer Chemotherapy Laboratory had concluded that though single chemotherapeutic agents worked quite well, some cancer cells could become resistant and allow the cancer to reappear in a stronger, more aggressive form a few months or years after treatment. He implemented the technique of multiple cancer chemotherapy agents used in concert—creating a "cocktail" of specific chemotherapeutic agents to fight cancer and overcome the problem of resistance.

From his work in the 1960s at the Stanford Cancer Chemotherapy Laboratory, he concluded that some metals had powerful toxic properties that could cause cancer and other serious diseases. As a result of his effort, he published several toxicology and cancer publications. Some of the publications included a review that linked trace and toxic metals with cancer (1960), a book on chelation and cancer (1963), a review on metal carcinogenesis (1969), an attempt to understand the mechanism of metal carcinogenesis (1969), and a book (as co-editor) on carcinogenic metals (1987).

After decades of working with cancer-causing agents, Furst set out to find a non-animal model for determining the toxic potential of metals and chemical compounds. He developed a protocol to evaluate metal toxicity using the common earthworm.
