= Margaret Morse =

Former professor at the University of California

Margaret Morse was an emerita professor at the University of California, Santa Cruz who taught film and video. She was also a well-versed author known for her critical analysis of both United States and European media artists. She had a propensity for closed-circuit video installations. Much of her work and career revolved around subjects in experimental film, video art, interactive Media and written works looking into our interaction with modern media and digital machines.

Margaret Morse served in a chair position at ISEA2006 Symposium + ZeroOne San Jose: A Global Festival of Art on the Edge, and gave a keynote presentation in which she presented a general overview of how the "umbrella term" of new media or digital art can no longer be applied to many emerging forms of artwork.

== Life and education ==
Morse obtained her PhD and M.A. in German literature and the philosophy of film from the University of California, Berkeley, where she attended from 1967 to 1977. She also received her B.A. in philosophy from Humboldt University of Berlin, and a B.A. in history, philosophy, and German at Freie Universität Berlin. At the end of her time here, Morse would receive a Fulbright Fellowship. During this fellowship, Morse would conduct research on women writers and artists in the Cold War era of the German Democratic Republic and their representation in literature and film.

Between 1979 and 1991, Margaret worked in multiple teaching positions at the San Francisco State University, the University of San Francisco, and the San Francisco Art Institute. She taught in subjects dealing with film and experimental video art. In 1980-1982, Margaret worked as an assistant professor at Vanderbilt and dealt with archival research in the Vanderbilt Television archives. These archives dealt with early TV news and sports themes and their usage in media.

In 1987–1990, Morse taught film theory and electronic arts as an assistant professor at the University of Southern California Cinema School.

Between 1991 and 2012, Morse held many faculty and administrative positions at the University of California, Santa Cruz including, but not limited to, acting dean of the Arts, UC Education Abroad director, and emerita professor. The subjects she focused on as professor included film & documentary, live TV, vdeo art, installation art, interactive and interventionist art, digital art and culture. (06)

In 2000, Morse also conducted research and had a Residency in Sociology at Princeton University.

== Works ==
Morse was renowned to students of media studies primarily due to her critically acclaimed analyses of media culture. Her works such as "Talk, Talk, Talk: The Space of Discourse in TV News, Sportscasts, Talk Shows and Advertising" (1985); "The Television News Personality and Credibility: Reflections on the News in Transition" (1986); and "An Ontology of Everyday Distraction: The Freeway, the Mall and Television" (1990) are now considered "classics" of the field.

In 1985, Morse wrote "Shaking and Waking" an essay that reviewed Steve Fagin's 82 minute video installation Virtual Play: The Double Direct Monkey Wrench in Black's Machinery. This was Morse's first essay on video art and was featured as the third chapter in the book "Talkin' with your mouth full : conversations with the videos of Steve Fagin."

In 1986, Morse contributed to the community publication project, Video Networks with her review and interview piece, "Mary Lucier: Burning and Shining". Video Networks was initiated by artist and editor Doug Hall and covered video art, installation, and digital media criticism aimed at the media arts public rather than academic discourse.

In 1994, Morse published the essay "What do Cyborgs Eat?: Oral Logic in an Information Society". This publication was reprinted, translated, and included in her later 1998 book, Virtualities.

In 1997, she worked as the principal author for the book "Hardware, Software, Artware". With both an English and German translations, this was arguably one of the most successful projects Morse was involved with. The book served as a lexicon of twenty artists and their respective works. Such a tool was an invaluable resource for curators.

In 1998, she published Virtualities: Television, Media Art and Cyberculture. This, 300-page book, focused on the development of media and how it has affected our dichotomy and interactions with machines. The book also proposed a nuanced perspective on the limitations and potentiality of the digital disciplines.

In 1999, she published a digital CD-ROM called "Media-Architectural Installations". It included translated versions in English, Spanish and French in the "On Translation" version.

In 2003, Morse wrote the scholarly article "The Poetics of Interactivity" in: Women, Art and Technology, which was edited by Judy Malloy. The article is known as being both influential and debatable; it has inspired a dialog in print about interactivity between an artist/writer and a curator. The information from this book was featured in artist Ken Feingold's Selected works of Ken Feingold 1978-2007 as he was one of the artists featured in it.

== Themes explored ==
- New media
- Media history
- German cinema
- Film history and theory
- Media art, digital culture

== Personal life ==
In 1982, during her time at Vanderbilt, Morse was a participant in the Third International Institute for Semiotic Studies, where she learned theory on the signs and symbols of communicative behavior.

In 1984, Morse took a computer graphics course at the Academy of Art, San Francisco, that inspired her to take interest in digital production and research. This course, along with the acquisition of an Apple Macintosh computer would be the catalyst for her seminal work, Virtualities ("Television Graphics and the Virtual Body: Words on the Move," 1998).

In 1990, Morse attended the Cyberthon event, which was focused around virtual reality and was a large influence on her work in Virtualities.

Between 1990 and 1995, Morse followed SIGGRAPH, ISEA and Ars Electronica as well as being in attendance at the ZKM Center.

Morse spent time researching collaborations in art discourse and practice, as well as exploring cultural changes in Eastern Europe between 1989 and 2009. Other writing projects included a monograph on Leni Riefenstahl's "Triumph of the Will" and a book titled "Art and the Other Senses."
