= Ron Najafi =

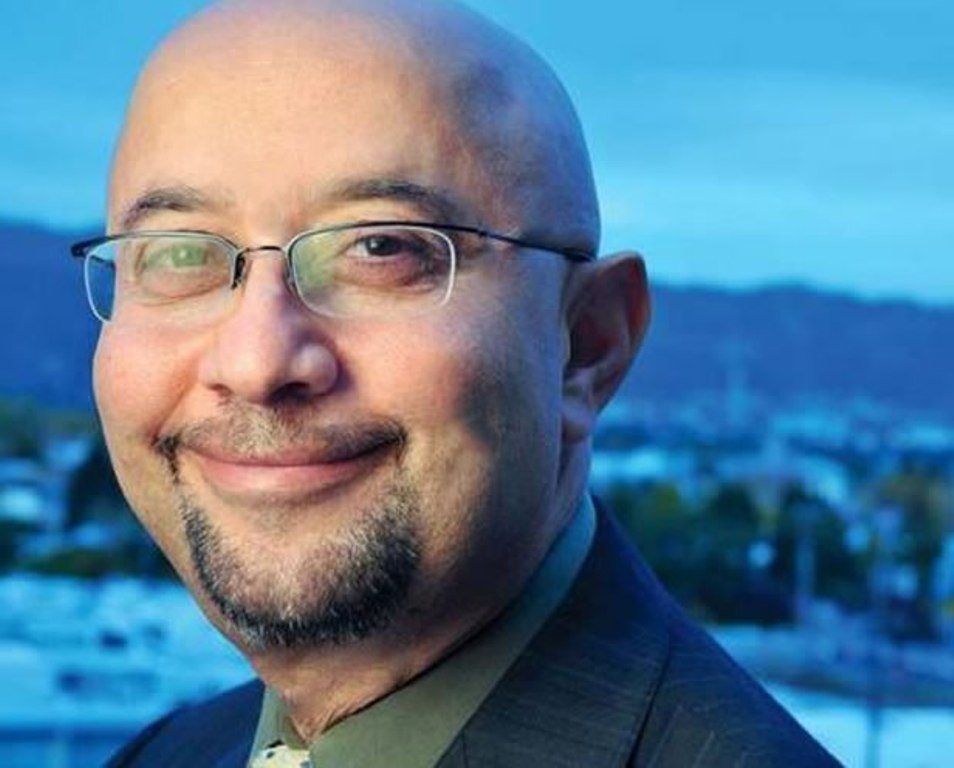
- Najafi around 2014
- Born: Ramin Najafi; 1958 (age 67–68); Tehran, Iran
- Citizenship: American
- Education: University of San Francisco Chemistry, B.S. – Chemistry, M.S., University of California, Davis Organic Chemistry, Ph.D.
- Occupations: Businessman, chemist
- Known for: Innovation of antimicrobial compounds Aganocides and founder and CEO of Emery Pharma
- Family: Kathryn Najafi (sister)
- Website: emerypharma.com

Ramin "Ron" Najafi (Persian: رامین نجفی) is an Iranian-American businessman and chemist who is the Founder and CEO of Emery Pharma. He was also the Founder and former CEO of NovaBay Pharmaceuticals.

Post-Ph.D., He worked at Sigma-Aldrich, Rhône-Poulenc Rorer (now Sanofi), and PerkinElmer-Applied Biosystems before leaving to found CP Lab Safety, NovaBay Pharmaceuticals and Emery Pharma.

Najafi holds over 50 patents and pending patent applications, including a class of non-antibiotic, antimicrobial compounds named Aganocides. In 2014, Ron Najafi and his sister, Kathryn Najafi, MD (Ophthalmologist & Surgeon) discovered a unique formulation of NeutroPhase to help manage patients with blepharitis.

== Early life and education ==
Najafi was born in Tehran, in 1958. He completed his primary education and received his high school diploma from Alborz High School in Tehran. In 1976, he emigrated to the United States before the Iranian Revolution.

He began his undergraduate degree in pharmacy at the University of Pittsburgh, and earned both a B.S. and M.S. in chemistry under the guidance of Professor John Soderquist at the University of San Francisco. He then received his Ph.D. at UC Davis under the tutelage of Professor (Emeritus) George Zweifel.

== Career ==
Najafi was a Senior Development Chemist at Sigma-Aldrich Corp (1989–1991). He then moved to become a Research Scientist at Rhone Poulenc Rorer (1991–1993). This was followed by PerkinElmer-Applied Biosystems (1993–1996).

He founded and became Chairman and CEO of NovaBay Pharmaceuticals, Inc. (2000–2015). He then founded Emery Pharma in 2015, where he became the Chairman and CEO.

In his work, Najafi innovated a class of non-antibiotic, antimicrobial compounds, including a class of non-antibiotic, antimicrobial compounds named Aganocides.

In September 2013, working together with John Crew, MD (vascular surgeon) they developed Crew-NovaBay, a minimally invasive surgical procedure to treat flesh eating bacteria.

Najafi heads Emery Pharma located in Alameda, California.

== Recognition ==
Najafi is among the U.S. State Department's "List of Prominent Iranian Americans." Najafi was recognized by PharmaVoice 100 as one of 100 most influential leaders of 2008.

He is an inventor on more than 50 patents & pending patents applications, including a class of non-antibiotic, antimicrobial compounds. The lead molecule, Auriclosene has broad spectrum of activity against bacteria (Wang 2011), viruses (Yoon 2011), and fungi (Ghannoum 2013), is chemically stable (Wang 2008), and has extremely low probability of developing resistance (D'Lima 2012).

By 2013, Auriclosene was in four clinical trials for treatment of adenoviral conjunctivitis, bacterial conjunctivitis, impetigo and urinary catheter blockage and encrustation (Gottardi 2013).

== Publications ==
- Ghannoum MA, Long L, Cirino AJ, Miller AR, Najafi R, Wang L, Sharma K, Anderson M, Memarzadeh B. "Efficacy of NVC-422 in the treatment of dermatophytosis caused by Trichophyton mentagrophytes using a guinea pig model." Int J Dermatol. 2013; 52: 567–71. doi: 10.1111/j.1365-4632.2012.05477.x.
- Jekle A, Yoon J, Zuck M, Najafi R, Wang L, Shiau T, Francavilla C, Rani SA, Eitzinger C, Nagl M, Anderson M, Debabov D. "NVC-422 inactivates Staphylococcus aureus toxins." Antimicrob Agents Chemother. 2013 Feb;57(2):924-9. doi: 10.1128/AAC.01945-12.
- Crew J, Varilla R, Rocas TA, Debabov D, Wang L, Najafi A, Rani SA, Najafi RR, Anderson M. "NeutroPhase(®) in chronic non-healing wounds." Int J Burns Trauma. 2012;2(3):126-34.
- Yoon J, Jekle A, Najafi R, Ruado F, Zuck M, Khosrovi B, Memarzadeh B, Debabov D, Wang L, Anderson M. "Virucidal mechanism of action of NVC-422, a novel antimicrobial drug for the treatment of adenoviral conjunctivitis." Antiviral Res. 2011 Dec;92(3):470-8. doi: 10.1016/j.antiviral.2011.10.009.
- Darouiche D, Najafi R, Krantz K, Debabov D, Friedman L, Khosrovi B, Wang L, Iovino S, Anderson M. "NVC-422: Antiinfective agent, treatment of impetigo, treatment of conjunctivitis, treatment of urinary tract infections." Drugs Fut. 2011;36:651–656.
- Low E, Kim B, Francavilla C, Shiau TP, Turtle ED, O'Mahony DJ, Alvarez N, Houchin A, Xu P, Zuck M, Celeri C, Anderson MB, Najafi RR, Jain RK. "Structure stability/activity relationships of sulfone stabilized N,N-dichloroamines." Bioorg Med Chem Lett. 2011; 21(12): 3682–5. doi: 10.1016/j.bmcl.2011.04.084.
- Wang L, Belisle B, Bassiri M, Xu P, Debabov D, Celeri C, Alvarez N, Robson MC, Payne WG, Najafi R, Khosrovi B. "Chemical characterization and biological properties of NVC-422, a novel, stable N-chlorotaurine analog." Antimicrob Agents Chemother. 2011 Jun;55(6):2688-92. doi: 10.1128/AAC.00158-11.
- Francavilla C, Turtle ED, Kim B, O'Mahony DJ, Shiau TP, Low E, Alvarez NJ, Celeri CE, D'Lima L, Friedman LC, Ruado FS, Xu P, Zuck ME, Anderson MB, Najafi RR, Jain RK. "Novel N-chloroheterocyclic antimicrobials." Bioorg Med Chem Lett. 2011 May 15;21(10):3029-33. doi: 10.1016/j.bmcl.2011.03.035.
- Shiau TP, Turtle ED, Francavilla C, Alvarez NJ, Zuck M, Friedman L, O'Mahony DJ, Low E, Anderson MB, Najafi R, Jain RK. "Novel 3-chlorooxazolidin-2-ones as antimicrobial agents." Bioorg Med Chem Lett. 2011 May 15;21(10):3025-8. doi: 10.1016/j.bmcl.2011.03.036.
- Francavilla C, Low E, Nair S, Kim B, Shiau TP, Debabov D, Celeri C, Alvarez N, Houchin A, Xu P, Najafi R, Jain R. "Quaternary ammonium N,N-dichloroamines as topical, antimicrobial agents." Bioorg Med Chem Lett. 2009; 19, 2731–2734. doi: 10.1016/j.bmcl.2009.03.120.
- Shiau TP, Houchin A, Nair S, Xu P, Low E, Najafi RR, Jain R. "Stieglitz rearrangement of N,N-dichloro-beta,beta-disubstituted taurines under mild aqueous conditions." Bioorg Med Chem Lett. 2009 Feb 15;19(4):1110-4. doi: 10.1016/j.bmcl.2008.12.109.
- Low E, Nair S, Shiau T, Belisle B, Debabov D, Celeri C, Zuck M, Najafi R, Georgopapadakou N, Jain R. "N,N-Dichloroaminosulfonic acids as novel topical antimicrobial agents." Bioorg Med Chem Lett. 2009;19: 196–198. doi: 10.1016/j.bmcl.2008.10.114.
- Wang L, Khosrovi B, Najafi R. "N-Chloro-2,2-dimethyltaurine: a new class of remarkably stable N-chlorotaurines." Tetrahedron Lett. 2008;49:2193–2195. doi:10.1016/j.tetlet.2008.02.038.
- Robson MC, Payne WG, Ko F, Mentis M, Donati G, Shafii SM, Culverhouse S, Wang L, Khosrovi B, Najafi R, Cooper DM, Bassiri M. "Hypochlorous Acid as a Potential Wound Care Agent: Part II. Stabilized Hypochlorous Acid: Its Role in Decreasing Tissue Bacterial Bioburden and Overcoming the Inhibition of Infection on Wound Healing." J Burns Wounds. 2007 Apr 11;6:e6.
- Wang L, Bassiri M, Najafi R, Najafi K, Yang J, Khosrovi B, Hwong W, Barati E, Belisle B, Celeri C, Robson MC. "Hypochlorous Acid as a Potential Wound Care Agent Part I. Stabilized Hypochlorous Acid: A component of the Inorganic Armamentarium of Innate Immunity." J Burns Wounds. 2007;6:65–79.
- Najafi MR, Wang M-L, Zweifel GS. "(Z)-alpha-(Trimethylsilyl)-alpha,beta-Unsaturated Esters Their Stereoselective Conversion into alpha,beta- and beta,gamma-Unsaturated Esters and beta,gamma-Unsaturated Ketene Acetals." J Org Chem. 1991;56:2468. doi: 10.1021/jo00007a039.
- Zweifel G, Najafi MR, Rajagopalan S. "Hydroboration of Methoxyenynes: A Novel Synthesis of (E)-Methoxyenones" Tetrahedron Lett 1988;29:1895. doi: 10.1016/S0040-4039(00)82071-7.
- Soderquist JA, Najafi MR. "Selective Oxidation of Organoboranes with Anhydrous Trimethylamine-N-Oxide." J Org Chem. 1986;51:1330. doi: 10.1021/jo00358a032.
- Zweifel GS, Leung T, Najafi MR, Najdi S. "Stereoselective Syntheses of Alkenyl-Substituted 1,3-Dioxolanes or 4,7-Dihydro-1,3-dioxepins or an (E)-alpha,beta-Unsaturated Aldehyde from (Z)-2-Butene-1,4-diols" J Org Chem. 1985;50:2004. doi: 10.1021/jo00211a053.
