= Patricia Liggins Hill =

American college professor (1942–2023)

- Born: Patricia Alveda Liggins; 1942; Washington, D.C., U.S.
- Died: January 23, 2023 (age 80); San Francisco, California, U.S.
- Education: Howard University; University of San Francisco; Stanford University
- Occupation: College professor

Patricia Alveda Liggins Hill (1942 – January 23, 2023) was an American college professor. She was one of the first three Black professors hired by the University of San Francisco (USF), in 1970. She became the first director of the Ethnic Studies program (now Critical Diversity Studies), and taught at USF until her retirement in 2015. Hill was general editor of Call and Response: The Riverside Anthology of the African American Literary Tradition (1997).

== Early life and education ==
Patricia Alveda Liggins was born in Washington, D.C., the daughter of Rudolph Liggins and Haroldine Alexander Liggins. She earned a bachelor's degree from Howard University in 1965. She earned a master's degree in English at the University of San Francisco (USF) in 1970. She earned a PhD in English from Stanford University in 1977. Her dissertation was titled "The new Black aesthetic as a counterpoetics: the poetry of Etheridge Knight" (1977).

== Career ==
In 1970, Hill was one of the first three Black professors hired by USF. She became the first director of the Ethnic Studies program. She gained full professor status at USF in 1985. In 1994, she and three other female English professors sued four male professors for job discrimination and sexual harassment; the case was settled out of court in 1997. Hill retired from USF in 2015.

== Publications ==
In addition to her own writings, Hill was general editor of Call and Response: The Riverside Anthology of the African American Literary Tradition (1997).

- "'The Violent Space': The Function of the New Black Aesthetic in Etheridge Knight's Prison Poetry" (1980)
- "'Let Me Make the Songs for the People': A Study of Frances Watkins Harper's Poetry" (1981)
- "Frances W. Harper's Aunt Chloe Poems from 'Sketches of Southern Life': Antithesis to the Plantation Literary Tradition" (1981)
- "'Blues for a Mississippi Black Boy': Etheridge Knight's Craft in the Black Oral Tradition" (1982)
- "Frances Watkins Harper's Moses: A Story of the Nile: Apologue of the Emancipation Struggle" (1984)

== Personal life ==
Hill had two children, Sanya and Solomon. She died in 2023, at the age of 80. The Dr. Patricia Liggins Hill BASE Scholarship was founded in her memory.
