= Tommie Lindsey =

American speech and debate coach (born 1951)

- Born: September 28, 1951 (age 74); Oakland, California
- Education: University of San Francisco (BA, PhD)
- Occupation: Teacher
- Known for: Forensics coach
- Spouse: Lois Bailey Lindsey
- Awards: MacArthur Fellows Program

Tommie Lindsey is an American speech and debate coach who spent the majority of his career at James Logan High School in Union City, California.

== Early life and education ==
Lindsey was born into a large family in Mississippi and had eight siblings. His family moved to West Oakland in the 1950s. His mother died in 1965 and his father died in 1968 and he lived with his grandmother for a time. Lindsey attended Castlemont High School, where he participated in inter-mural speech competitions. After high school, he received a scholarship to attend the University of San Francisco, where he was active in the student body. He graduated in 1973 with a degree in sociology and was the school's first Black valedictorian. He later returned to the University of San Francisco to study educational counseling.

== Career ==
Lindsey began his career as a teacher in Alameda County, California. Lindsey began working as a speech and debate teacher at James Logan High School in Union City, California, in 1989. His team quickly became one of the most successful in the country, regularly winning state and national championships, and boasted a high graduation rate—while only 40% of the school's students attended college after graduation, 90% of Lindsey's speech and debate students did. By 2004, the James Logan team had over 300 student participants every year. In 1993, Lindsey was named one of the California Teachers of the Year by the California Department of Education. In 2000, he was named "National Forensics Coach of the Year." In 2002, he was awarded the Thomas Glenn Pelham award by the Barkley Forum.

Lindsey and the James Logan team were the subjects of the PBS documentary Accidental Hero: Room 408, which premiered in 2002. The documentary followed him as he attempted to raise money for the team after the school cut the team's budget. In 2003, Lindsey was awarded $100,000 by The Oprah Winfrey Show to support the school's team. Lindsey was the recipient of a MacArthur Grant in 2004, which awarded him $500,000 to continue building the James Logan speech and debate team. He was the first high school teacher to receive a MacArthur Grant.

In 2006, Lindsey wrote It Doesn't Take a Genius with Randall McCutcheon. The book was published by McGraw Hill Education.

Lindsey retired in 2017.

== Personal life ==
Lindsey is married and has two children.

== Works ==
- It Doesn't Take A Genius: Five Truths to Inspire Success in Every Student. Authors Randall McCutcheon, Tommie Lindsey, McGraw-Hill, 2006, ISBN 978-0-07-146084-2
