= Moira Gunn =

American podcaster

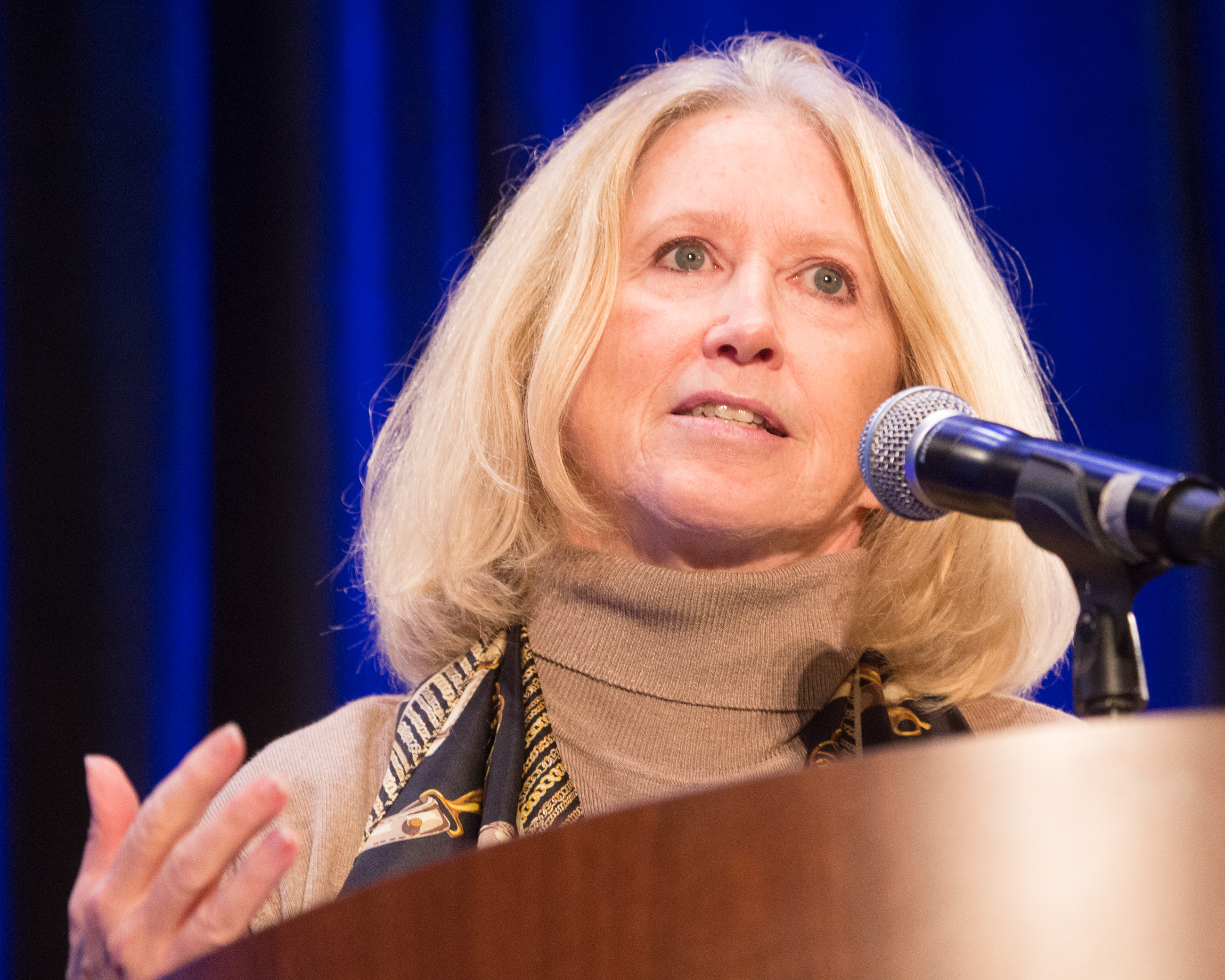
- Moira Gunn speaking in October 2014
- Born: New York City, U.S.
- Education: University of San Francisco (BS); Purdue University (MS); Purdue University (PhD)
- Known for: Public Radio host

Moira Gunn is both an academic and a professional journalist. She is perhaps best known as the host of the public radio program Tech Nation, its regular segment BioTech Nation, as well as the weekly tech-sci commentary, Five Minutes. It airs on the National Public Radio stations domestically, and internationally on the AFRTS, Programs and interviews are also available on a number of podcast syndication outlets podcast as both Tech Nation for entire programs, and BioTech Nation, for biotech-focused topics. A former NASA computer scientist and engineer, Dr. Gunn is a professor at the University of San Francisco, where she is the Director of Bioentrepreneurship. Her work on BioTech Nation dovetails with her academic efforts, reflecting the multidisciplinary nature of moving scientific breakthroughs on the lab bench through to commercial products.

On Tech Nation, Gunn's focus has always been on the societal impact of technology and science, understanding the nature of innovation, and giving everyday listeners a sense of how to deal with the technological tsunami around them. The BioTech Nation segments, in particular, explore the new vision of humanity with afforded by the information of DNA, the evolution of medical treatments, the expanded capabilities of Digital Health, and the challenge of protecting individual privacy while the collective information of all may be necessary to address many of the challenges we face today. Media contact information for both Tech Nation and BioTech Nation is available on the Tech Nation website

Academically, Bioentrepreneurship courses are throughout the university as they require the successful collaboration of multi-disciplinary expertise. This includes science, intellectual property, venture capital, bioenterprise finance, bioenterprise law, strategic market insights, regulatory expertise, biostrategic media relations, bioethics, bioenterprise information systems, social policy and multinational expertise. Gunn's graduate courses include: Legal-Social-Ethical Impact of Biotech, Global & US Regulatory Affairs, Bioinnovation Management, and Local-National-Global Bioenterprise, Diagnostics + Digital Health, as well as study tours to leading global bioclusters, including Washington, DC, London-Oxford-Cambridge, Switzerland, Ireland/Northern Ireland, Australia, Montreal/Quebec, Puerto Rico and San Diego. A new graduate course is scheduled for Spring, 2027 - AI + Biotech, taking a close look at how Artificial Intelligence is being used for Drug Discovery and other applications in the Biotechnology Industry.

== Personal life ==
Moira Gunn was born in Staten Island, New York, and moved with her family to California at the age of 10. Gunn's family settled in Menlo Park, just as Silicon Valley was becoming prominent. At the time Sand Hill Road was open space - now the haunt of world-renowned venture capitalists. Technology start-ups were everywhere. Decades later, the Gunn family's bungalow on Santa Margarita Avenue was just three doors down from another modest home. The modest home was owned by Susan Wojcicki, who rented her garage to Sergey Brin and Larry Page as Google's first office.

Dr. Gunn currently lives in San Francisco.

== Education ==
Dr. Gunn's degrees include a Bachelor of Science degree in computer science from the University of San Francisco, a master's degree in computer science from Purdue University and a Doctor of Philosophy in mechanical engineering from Purdue. She was the first woman to earn a PhD in mechanical engineering from the university, where she more recently was awarded an honorary doctorate in science.

== Career ==
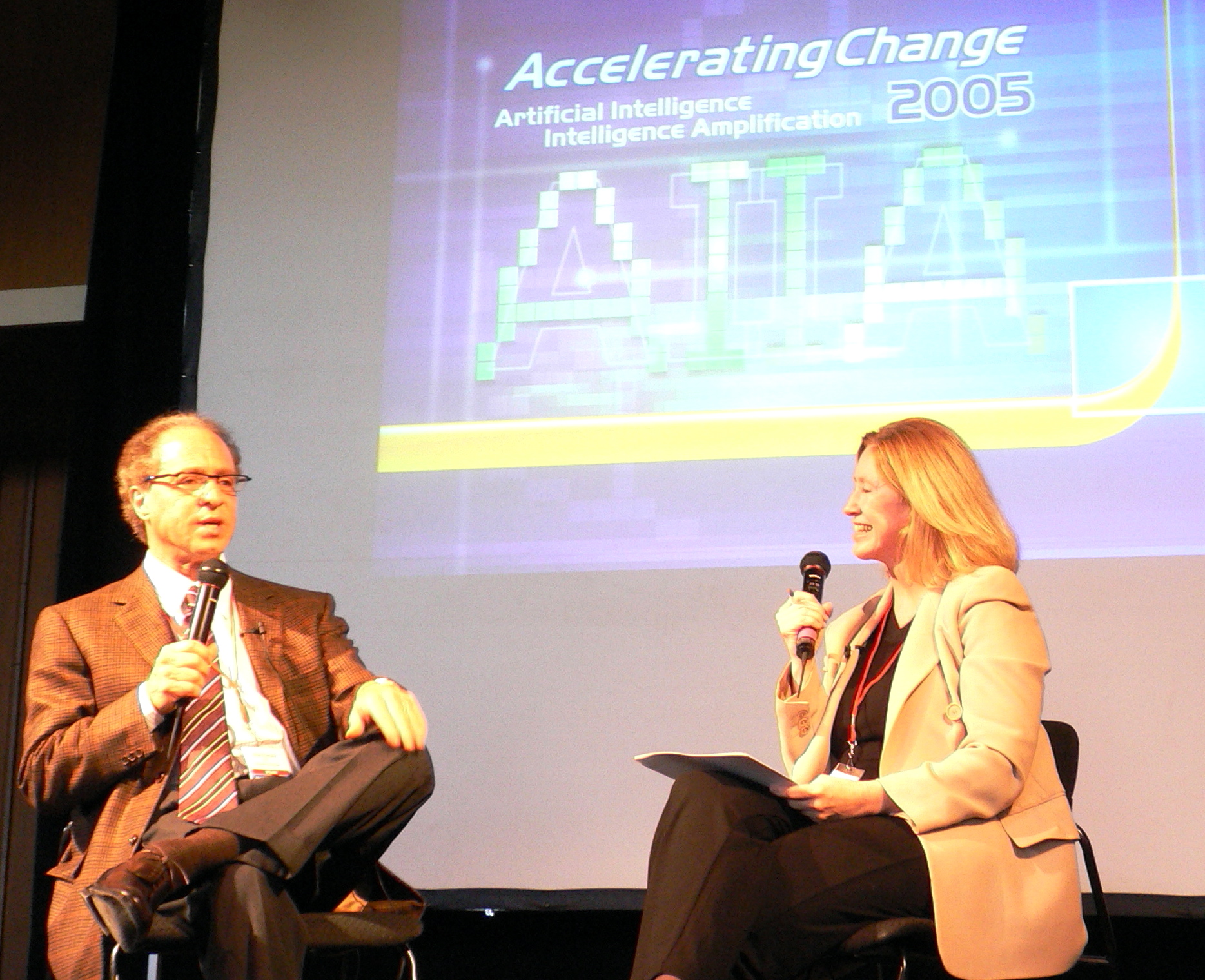
Raymond Kurzweil and Moira Gunn at Accelerating Change

Gunn's early career included work at NASA on large-scale scientific computation and global communications, with special emphasis in infrared satellite image processing, computational fluid dynamics, and global climate and weather modeling. She also did work in robotics engineering at IBM, Morton Thiokol, United Technologies/Pratt & Whitney, Lockheed-Martin, Rolls-Royce, and the US Navy.

== Honors ==
Dr. Gunn was awarded the Public Service Award to the Individual by the National Science Board, for her contributions to the public understanding of science and engineering. Gunn was also awarded an honorary doctorate in science by Purdue University|url=https://www.cs.purdue.edu/news/articles/2009/gunn-phd.html|website=Purdue University|publisher=Purdue University|accessdate=24 March 2022|date=18 May 2009|
