= Nicole Zaloumis =

American news anchor (born 1980)

- Born: Sarah Nicole Zaloumis; January 17, 1980 (age 46); Oakland, California, U.S.
- Other name: Nicole Smith
- Education: USF
- Occupation: Sports/News Anchor
- Agent: Matthew Kingsley
- Spouse: Frank Smith
- Children: 6

Nicole Zaloumis (born January 17, 1980) is a former American news anchor for KPIX. Additionally, Zaloumis was previously the host of NFL Network's weekday morning show NFL AM and formerly a sports broadcaster, who previously worked as a co-host of "Left Coast Live" on Mad Dog Sports Radio on SiriusXM Satellite Radio. Nicole is married to NFL coach Frank Smith. They have 6 children.

== Early years ==
Zaloumis was raised in Danville, California and is of Greek descent. She also graduated at the University of San Francisco in 2003.

== Career ==
Prior to working at NFL Network, in 2004, she was the weekend sports anchor at WRC-TV in Washington, DC, where she also was the host of a weekly sports show on the Washington Redskins. She also reported on the three Arizona professional sports teams during her time as a weekend anchor for ABC 15 in Phoenix. She previously worked at the Big Ten Network along with Comcast SportsNet New England where she was a daily sports anchor. In the summer of 2012, She joined NFL Network to become the host of the new weekday morning show NFL AM. In June 2014, It was announced her departure from NFL AM was to spend more time with her family. She appeared as a guest host on the August 14, 2014 edition of Fox Sports Live on Fox Sports 1. On August 14, 2023, She joined KPIX as the new weekday morning news anchor and departed by the end of May 2024 due to a personal issue.
