= James Raser =

James Joseph "Jim" Raser (July 8, 1926 — January 16, 1991) was an American radio producer, writer, director, sportscaster, and a television sportswriter and broadcaster.

== Early life ==
Raser was born in Alameda, California, to parents James Raser, a fire chief, and Mary O'Donnell Raser, a homemaker. Raser attended Saint Joseph High School, where he was the sports editor of the school paper, The Pilot. After high school, Raser enlisted in the United States Army Air Corps and served in World War II. At the conclusion of his service in 1946, Raser began attending the University of San Francisco. Majoring in English, he began a path that would lead to 30 years in sports broadcasting.

At USF, Raser rose through the ranks to become sports editor of The Foghorn, which counted among its staff former White House Press Secretary, Pierre Salinger. Raser's USF roommate was Pete Rozelle, the former commissioner of the National Football League and, at the time, sports publicist for the USF Dons athletic department. Raser and Rozelle would remain friends until Raser's death in 1991. Classmate, Ollie Matson, went on to NFL and Olympic fame.

Upon graduating USF in 1950, Raser worked at Bay Area CBS television and radio affiliates as a sportswriter and stand-in broadcaster. In 1957, he was hired by KNX-CBS Radio, and he and his young family moved to Hollywood.

== Career at KNX ==
In Raser's 28 years at KNX (AM 1070), he broadcast from every major Los Angeles sporting event, including live pre-game and post-game interviews from games of the Los Angeles Dodgers, California Angels, Los Angeles Rams, Los Angeles Lakers, USC Trojans, UCLA Bruins, and the Los Angeles Kings. He was the play-by-play broadcaster for the city's first professional hockey team, the Los Angeles Blades. He also covered every PGA Tour event on the West Coast, as well as the major automobile races of NASCAR and USAC, including 12 live broadcasts from the Indianapolis 500.

During the 1960s and 1970s, Raser was a fixture around the Los Angeles Memorial Coliseum, where he assisted in the play-by-play broadcasting of Los Angeles Rams and University of Southern California football contests. For most of the 1970s, he was the public address announcer for USC basketball games at the Los Angeles Sports Arena. Raser was also a regular on the Mobile Economy Run. In addition to radio broadcasting, he was the weekend sportscaster for KCBS-TV's The Big News, which was Los Angeles' most popular newscast in the 1960s.

In his heyday, Raser's typical week at KNX consisted of four weekday morning live broadcasts, and the writing and directing of his four Saturday programs: "Sports Firing Line" (one of Southern California's first listener call-in sports shows), "Jim Raser's Outdoors," "Sports Profile With Jim Raser," and "Jim Raser's Sports Scoreboard."

He was a member of both the Writers Guild of America and the Directors Guild of America. Among the dozens of awards he received while at KNX were five "Golden Mikes" presented by the Radio & Television News Association of Southern California. Raser was also a charter member of the Southern California Sports Broadcasters Association. In addition to broadcasting, he voiced hundreds of radio commercials.

In the late 1970s, KNX did away with all its sports programming, and Raser remained on the news side of the organization until retiring in 1985.

== Retirement ==
After retiring, Raser built a home on a lake near Grass Valley, CA, and spent his last years playing softball, fishing, and golfing. He died on January 16, 1991.
