= Andrey Muravyov =

Russian businessperson

- Born: October 26, 1974 (age 51); Kemerovo, USSR
- Citizenship: Soviet Union, Russia
- Education: Kemerovo State University of Technology; University of San Francisco
- Occupations: Entrepreneur, Owner and president of the Parus Fund
- Spouse: married
- Children: two

Andrey Anatolievich Muravyov (Russian: Андрей Анатольевич Муравьёв; born 26 October 1974) is a Russian businessperson. He made his wealth as the CEO of a Russian cement company and through stakes in the Russian online payment company QIWI.

== Early life and education ==
Andrey Anatolievich Muravyov was born on October 26, 1974, in Kemerovo. He graduated from Kemerovo Lycee No. 62 and went on to graduate from the Department of Economics of the Kemerovo State University of Technology in 1997 by correspondence (with a degree in accounting and auditing) and the University of San Francisco School of Management in 1998, with a degree in finance. He lived and worked in the US in 1993–1998.

== Career ==
He worked for ZAO TransUgol (Moscow, 1999–2000) and the Kemerovo Regional Government (2002–2003), before becoming VP at Sibconcord, a financial and industrial association, where he worked in 2002–2003. He was a founding shareholder and President of Siberian Cement. He is on the board of Rocket and Space Corporation Energia.

He established and became President of Parus Capital Limited, an investment fund, in August 2008. He it using this fund to invest in food production, the IT industry, real estate, and in construction of new cement plants.

Finance Magazine estimated Andrey Muravyov's personal fortune at RUB 3.7 billion (approximately US$122 million) in 2008. His fortune was estimated at US$290 million in February 2011.

In 2020, the U.S. government charged him with campaign finance crimes. The charges were sealed until March 2022. He allegedly financed a scheme by Rudy Giuliani, Lev Parnas and Igor Fruman to distribute illegal campaign contributions to American politicians, including Florida politician Ron DeSantis's gubernatorial campaign.

=== SIIC LLC ===
Andrey Muravyov became a founding shareholder in 2000 of the Siberian Industrial Investment Company LLC (SIIC) and its CEO.

The company first attracted the attention of the media and the public attention for the first time in 2012 in connection with its legal battle with Siberian Cement holding company over failing to repay a large loan. Siberian Cement had transferred RUB 30 million (approximately US$1 million) to SIIC LLC in June 2007. Andrey Muravyov was President of SibCem at the time, with another SIIC founding shareholder, Andrey Kirikov, serving on SibCem's board of directors. In April 2012, the Kemerovo Regional Arbitration Court ruled to collect the debt from SIIC LLC for the benefit of Topkinsk Cement LLC, a SibCem subsidiary, together with interest, fines and damages, a total amount of RUB 38.5 million.

=== Siberian Cement Holding Company ===
Andrey Muravyov was one of the founding shareholders of Siberian Cement in 2004, and served as President of the company for four years (until 2008). Under his management, the holding company accumulated its core cement assets it currently owns, making substantial investments in upgrades, and went public. Muravyovу was also able to set up an effective sales system at the holding company. SibCem was No. 2 Russian cement producer by mid-2008 and was widely seen as one of the most efficient companies in the industry (earning margins of up to 53%). Expert magazine estimated SibCem's market capitalization as reaching US$5.7 billion at one point. Expert magazine wrote that SibCem was the most dearly valued cement company in the world.”

Muravyov stepped aside from managing the holding company’s day-to-day business in August 2008, resigning as President. Almost immediately, he started selling off his stake in the company, explaining his decision by that he was no longer involved in managing the company, “and it made little sense to hold on to such a large stake as a portfolio investor.” By the fall of 2009, Muravyov had sold his entire interest in the cement business, announcing that he was interested in investing in farming in the Krasnodar Region and in IT (he held a 10% stake in Integrated Instant Payment Systems at the time".

Muravyov's disagreements with SibCem Chairman Oleg Sharykin over a EUR 476 million transaction to buy Intelcementi's Turkish assets were given as the main reason for resigning as SibCem President and exiting the company as a shareholder. Muravyov was behind the deal all along, claiming that it would help the holding company not only to bolster its positions on the Russian market, but also to facilitate its access to international markets. In May 2008, before Muravyov's resignation, a binding agreement was signed, with SibCem transferring to the seller (a French subsidiary of Italcementi) a commitment fee of EUR 50 million. However, the deal was not closed, and the agreement was terminated by November 2008. SibCem's continuing core shareholder – Sibconcord LLC – took the matter to courts in early 2009, claiming that the aborted deal had not been duly approved by the board or shareholders, and should therefore be considered null and void. The court found for the plaintiff, triggering the holding company's attempts to recover the commitment fee, which was still ongoing as of year-end 2012, and is still in litigation.

In the summer of 2012, Siberian Cement announced that the company had held an extensive audit after Muravyov's departure. According to the “new” SibCem, the audit had revealed financial irregularities while Muravyov was at the helm of the company. Among other things, large loans were extended to several top managers on Muravyov's team (who quit SibCem together with Muravyov) and their affiliated companies – loans that were never paid back. The current management of SibCem are trying to collect the outstanding debts through the court system. Respondents for these lawsuits include former VP for economics and finance Sergey Khrapunov, former Board of Directors member Andrey Kirikov (both left Siberian Cement soon after Muravyov did) and SIIC LLC, a company founded by A. Muravyov and A. Kirikov. As of August 2012, approximately RUB 140 million of this past-due debt was still outstanding (the amount includes fines, penalties, and interest.

=== RTM OAO ===
Muravyov and another SibCem founding shareholder and Board member Andrey Kirikov acquired an effective controlling stake (about 42%) in RTM, a company building and operating modern shopping centers, in the fall of 2008. Muravyov became a board member of RTM in November 2008, and was elected the company's chairman in December 2008. Muravyov's former SibCem colleague and VP of that company for economics and finance, became the new firm's General Director.

The RTM deal was also mentioned by the media as one of the reasons for conflict between Muravyov and SibCem management, because the title to the shares changing hands was contested. Muravyov said that he bought a stake in RTM as a personal investment, and Siberian Cement played no role in the transaction; Siberian Cement confirmed this information.

RTM real estate portfolio was valued at US$983.4 million (market value) at the end of 1H 2008 (end of June 2008), according to Colliers International. RTM General Director S. Khrapunov told the media in June 2009 that the company's asset value was down at US$350 million — 400 million (the media explained this loss of value by crisis-related drop in real estate prices, bringing about a sharp decline in the company's asset value), whereas its debt burden increased from US$486 million to US$530 million. Khrapunov estimated the amount of default-rated loans without any hope of repayment at least at US$450 million. RTM went into bankruptcy in July 2009. In the fall of 2011, the company went into receivership.

In the summer of 2012, Investment Funds LLC (one of RTM's creditors which never got back its loans) sent a letter of complaint to Russian federal legislator (State Duma deputy) A. Khinshtein accusing the owners of RTM of unlawful acts. Among other things, the letter claimed that the RTM management had been siphoning money and liquid assets out of the company and its subsidiaries, entering into fraudulent transactions and paying for them with the assets. Investment Funds LLC estimates that "at least US$80 million of rental revenues, more than US$6 million of VAT refunds, and US$30 million in proceeds from direct sale of unencumbered properties, or a total amount of approximately US$100 million was taken out of RTM and its subsidiaries in 2008–2011. In addition, Investment Funds accused RTM management of intentionally not repaying loans received from some of the largest banks which provided debt finance to the company, including Sberbank, Vnesheconombank, Uniastrum Bank, Alfa Bank. Financial institutions lost at least US$300 million from their dealings with the real estate developer, Rossiiskaya Gazeta reports.

=== Parus Capital ===
When he established Parus Capital investment fund in 2008, Muravyov invited as a partner Boris Sigegubko, a well-known investment banker who had worked with UBS for 17 years. Parus Capital focuses on Russian securities undervalued by international portfolio investors, according to Muravyov. Muravyov claims that, after starting with US$30 million in 2008, the fund had US$50 million in assets by 2012 without raising additional capital from investors; the fund's asset value appreciated 19% year-on-year in 2012 alone, according to Muravyov. The fund's core shareholders claim they have an additional US$150 million – both of available equity and as debt they can access.

Parus Agro Group was established in 2009 with the Fund's resources; the new company focuses on crop farming and owns approximately 95,000 hectares of arable land in the Krasnodar Region of Russia and in Ukraine. The group includes marketing and logistics companies, as well as grain silos with 290,000 tons storage capacity. The fund has also invested some of its assets in QIWI and in real estate construction projects. Muravyov built Ecopromservice, Russia's only plant to recycle and restore oversized tires in 2010 and established the United Water Company in Pyatigorsk to "produce and bottle mineral water.

== U.S. indictment ==
On March 14, 2022, Muravyov was charged with making illegal political contributions as a foreign national, and conspiring to make illegal political contributions as a foreign national in the names of straw donors Lev Parnas and Igor Fruman.

Muravyov's role as "Foreign National-1" in the 2019 indictment was first revealed by David Corn on October 11, 2019.

== Personal life ==
He is married with two sons.
