= Allen Wastler =

Digital content executive in the financial services industry

Allen Wastler is a digital content executive in the financial services industry and a former financial journalist and TV personality. He currently oversees digital content in the insurance industry.

== Background ==
Allen Wastler was managing editor on CNBC.com from August 2007 through September 2015. In addition to managing the website and writing an online column, he made regular appearances on the network, commenting on various internet-related developments and news items.

During his time at CNBC, he also served on the board of governors of the Society of American Business Editors and Writers. He still serves as a judge in the organization's various contests.

Prior to CNBC, Wastler was managing editor of CNN's business news website, CNNMoney.com, a position he held since August 1999. He originally joined CNNfn.com, the website for the CNN's business news enterprise CNNfn, in May 1997 as a producer and became supervising producer later. The CNNfn network went out of business, but its website continued and became CNNMoney.

Before joining cable news network digital operations he wrote for the Journal of Commerce, a daily business newspaper owned by the Economist. He self-published a novel, Cargo Kills, based on his experiences during that time.

When Wastler ran the CNNMoney.com New York City newsroom, he also appeared regularly on the network's CNNMoney Morning weekday business show, and Your Money, a weekend personal finance show airing on CNN. He wrote an online column, Wastler's Wanderings, which touched on both business and personal finance issues.

== Education ==
Wastler has a bachelor's degree in writing from the Johns Hopkins University and an MBA from the University of San Francisco.
