= Marin County Superior Court =

California superior court with jurisdiction over Marin County

Superior Court of California, County of Marin
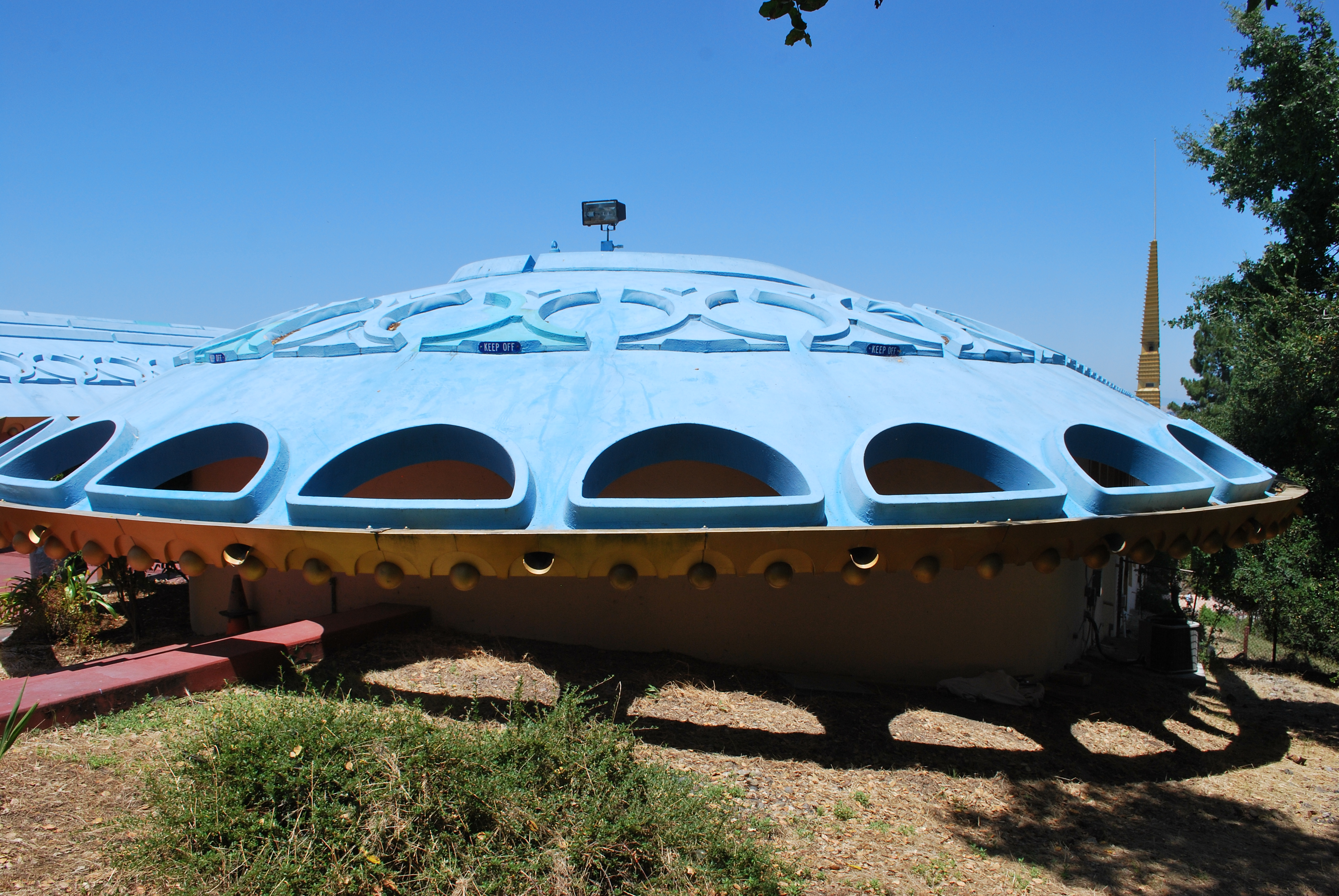
- Roof of Marin County Civic Center
- Interactive map of Superior Court of California, County of Marin
- 37.9987°N 122.5311°W
- Established: 1850
- Jurisdiction: Marin County, California
- Location: San Rafael
- Coordinates: 37.9987°N 122.5311°W
- Appeals to: California Court of Appeal for the First District
- Website: marin.courts.ca.gov

Presiding Judge
- Currently: Hon. Mark Talamantes

Assistant Presiding Judge
- Currently: Hon. Stephen Freccero

Court Executive Officer
- Currently: James M. Kim
- Since: 2015

The Superior Court of California, County of Marin, informally the Marin County Superior Court, is the California superior court with jurisdiction over Marin County. It is housed in the landmark Marin County Civic Center, designed by architect Frank Lloyd Wright and completed in 1962.

== History ==
Marin County was one of the original counties formed in 1850 when California gained statehood.

Marin County initially conducted its court activities in two temporary buildings in the county seat of San Rafael: first in a restored Mission building (1851–56) and then in a converted home that once belonged to Timothy Murphy (1856–73). A permanent courthouse was built at Fourth and A starting in 1872. That courthouse served the county until the new Civic Center was completed in the late 1960s; after it was abandoned, the 1872 courthouse was burned in what authorities suspected was an arson on May 25, 1971.
