= Greg McKeown (soccer) =

American soccer player

Personal information
- Place of birth: United States
- Position: Forward

Youth career
- 1973–1976: San Francisco Dons

Senior career*
Years	Team	Apps	(Gls)
1977–1978	San Jose Earthquakes	2	(0)
1980–1981	Sacramento Gold		
- * Club domestic league appearances and goals

Greg McKeown is an American retired soccer forward who played in the North American Soccer League and American Soccer League.

McKeown attended the University of San Francisco, playing on the men's soccer team from 1973 to 1977. In 1976, he scored a goal and assisted on another as the Dons won the NCAA Men's Division I Soccer Championship.

In 1977, McKeown captained the Dons to a second consecutive Division I championship.

In 1977, the San Jose Earthquakes selected McKeown in the first round of the North American Soccer League. He played two first-team games over two seasons. In 1980–1981, he played for the Sacramento Gold of the American Soccer League.

In 1989, he was co-owner of the Sacramento Senators of the Western Soccer League.

In 2003, McKeown was inducted into the University of San Francisco sports hall of fame.

Greg McKeown is the CFO for Somerston Estate and Wine Company in Napa Valley.
