= You Hwai-yin =

Taiwanese banker and politician

You Hwai-yin MLY
- 游淮銀
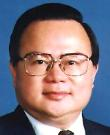

Member of the Legislative Yuan
- In office 1 February 1999 – 31 January 2002
- Constituency: Republic of China
- In office 1 February 1993 – 31 January 1999
- Constituency: Changhua County

Personal details
- Born: 26 April 1942 (age 84)
- Party: Kuomintang
- Education: Chinese Culture University; University of San Francisco
- Profession: Banker

You Hwai-yin (Chinese: 游淮銀; pinyin: Yóu Huáiyín; born 26 April 1942) is a Taiwanese banker and politician. He served in the Legislative Yuan from 1993 to 2002.

== Education and career ==
You studied at Chinese Culture University and attended graduate school at the University of San Francisco.

While You was a legislator, he chaired the Wan Gwo Securities Investment Trust Company and the Fu Long Securities Company and was also the largest shareholder in Taitung Business Bank. As part of an investigation into black gold politics, You was indicted for insider trading in August 2000. In September, the Taipei District Court found that You had concealed the Taitung Business Bank's 1996 losses in an effort to raise more capital. He was sentenced to a prison term of three months. Subsequent legal action in 2012 approximated the total loss at NT$2.6 billion and You was sentenced to another six years and six months in prison by the Taitung District Court.
