= San Francisco Dons men's basketball statistical leaders =

The San Francisco Dons men's basketball statistical leaders are individual statistical leaders of the San Francisco Dons men's basketball program in various categories, including points, assists, blocks, rebounds, and steals. Within those areas, the lists identify single-game, single-season, and career leaders. The Dons represent University of San Francisco in the NCAA's West Coast Conference.

San Francisco began competing in intercollegiate basketball in 1923. However, the school's record book does not generally list records from before the 1950s, as records from before this period are often incomplete and inconsistent. Since scoring was much lower in this era, and teams played much fewer games during a typical season, it is likely that few or no players from this era would appear on these lists anyway.

The NCAA did not officially record assists as a stat until the 1983–84 season, and blocks and steals until the 1985–86 season, but San Francisco's record books includes players in these stats before these seasons. These lists are updated through the end of the 2020–21 season.

== Scoring ==
Career
Rk	Player	Points	Seasons
1	Bill Cartwright	2,116	1975–76 1976–77 1977–78 1978–79
2	Quintin Dailey	1,814	1979–80 1980–81 1981–82
3	Darrell Tucker	1,805	1999–00 2000–01 2001–02 2002–03
4	Khalil Shabazz	1,804	2019–20 2020–21 2021–22 2022–23
5	Dior Lowhorn	1,773	2007–08 2008–09 2009–10
6	Jamaree Bouyea	1,718	2017–18 2018–19 2019–20 2020–21 2021–22
7	Winford Boynes	1,702	1975–76 1976–77 1977–78
8	Ollie Johnson	1,668	1962–63 1963–64 1964–65
9	Gerald Walker	1,665	1992–93 1993–94 1994–95 1995–96
10	Bill Russell	1,636	1953–54 1954–55 1955–56

Season
Rk	Player	Points	Season
1	Quintin Dailey	755	1981–82
2	Bill Cartwright	710	1978–79
3	Quintin Dailey	693	1980–81
4	Malik Thomas	676	2024–25
5	Dior Lowhorn	636	2007–08
6	Winford Boynes	628	1977–78
7	Ollie Johnson	627	1964–65
8	Bill Russell	622	1954–55
9	John Cox	621	2004–05
10	Pete Cross	615	1968–69

Single game
Rk	Player	Points	Season	Opponent
1	Keith Jackson	47	1987–88	Loyola Marymount

== Rebounds ==
Career
Rk	Player	Rebounds	Seasons
1	Bill Russell	1,606	1953–54 1954–55 1955–56
2	Ollie Johnson	1,323	1962–63 1963–64 1964–65
3	Bill Cartwright	1,137	1975–76 1976–77 1977–78 1978–79
4	Pete Cross	1,104	1967–68 1968–69 1969–70
5	Wallace Bryant	1,062	1978–79 1979–80 1980–81 1981–82
6	Kevin Restani	882	1971–72 1972–73 1973–74
7	Darrell Tucker	862	1999–00 2000–01 2001–02 2002–03
8	Dennis Black	786	1965–66 1966–67 1967–68
9	James Hardy	772	1975–76 1976–77 1977–78
	Eric Fernsten	772	1972–73 1973–74 1974–75

Season
Rk	Player	Rebounds	Season
1	Bill Russell	609	1955–56
2	Bill Russell	594	1954–55
3	Ollie Johnson	469	1964–65
4	Ollie Johnson	467	1963–64
	Pete Cross	467	1969–70
6	Bill Cartwright	455	1978–79
7	Bill Russell	403	1953–54
8	Pete Cross	400	1968–69
9	Byron Jones	392	1971–72
10	Ollie Johnson	387	1962–63

Single game
Rk	Player	Rebounds	Season	Opponent
1	Bill Russell	35	1954–55	Loyola Marymount

== Assists ==
Career
Rk	Player	Assists	Seasons
1	Orlando Smart	902	1990–91 1991–92 1992–93 1993–94
2	Cody Doolin	451	2010–11 2011–12 2012–13 2013–14
3	Jamaree Bouyea	421	2017–18 2018–19 2019–20 2020–21 2021–22
4	Frankie Ferrari	410	2014–15 2016–17 2017–18 2018–19
5	Gerald Walker	400	1992–93 1993–94 1994–95 1995–96
6	Marcus Williams	360	2022–23 2023–24 2024–25
7	LyRyan Russell	350	1997–98 1998–99 1999–00 2001–02
8	Jason Gaines	349	2000–01 2001–02 2002–03 2003–04 2004–05
9	Ali Thomas	334	1997–98 1998–99 1999–00 2000–01
10	Chubby Cox	320	1976–77 1977–78

Season
Rk	Player	Assists	Season
1	Orlando Smart	241	1991–92
2	Orlando Smart	237	1990–91
3	Orlando Smart	220	1992–93
4	Orlando Smart	204	1993–94
5	Frankie Ferrari	179	2017–18
6	Cody Doolin	174	2012–13
7	Frankie Ferrari	172	2018–19
8	Chubby Cox	162	1976–77
9	Chubby Cox	158	1977–78
10	Russ Coleman	154	1975–76

Single game
Rk	Player	Assists	Season	Opponent
1	Chubby Cox	15	1976–77	Seattle
	Orlando Smart	15	1990–91	Fairleigh Dickerson
	Orlando Smart	15	1990–91	Portland

== Steals ==
Career
Rk	Player	Steals	Seasons
1	Gerald Walker	344	1992–93 1993–94 1994–95 1995–96
2	Orlando Smart	279	1990–91 1991–92 1992–93 1993–94
3	Khalil Shabazz	236	2019–20 2020–21 2021–22 2022–23
4	Jamaree Bouyea	207	2017–18 2018–19 2019–20 2020–21 2021–22
5	Cody Doolin	154	2010–11 2011–12 2012–13 2013–14
6	Mark McCathrion	132	1985–86 1986–87 1987–88 1988–89
	Jason Gaines	132	2000–01 2001–02 2002–03 2003–04 2004–05
8	Quintin Dailey	131	1979–80 1980–81 1981–82
9	Marcus Williams	122	2022–23 2023–24 2024–25
10	LyRyan Russell	121	1997–98 1998–99 1999–00 2001–02
	Angelo Caloiaro	121	2008–09 2009–10 2010–11 2011–12

Season
Rk	Player	Steals	Season
1	Gerald Walker	109	1993–94
2	Gerald Walker	87	1992–93
3	Gerald Walker	80	1994–95
4	Khalil Shabazz	73	2022–23
5	Antonio Kellogg	69	2006–07
6	Gerald Walker	68	1995–96
7	Jamaree Bouyea	62	2021–22
8	Orlando Smart	61	1990–91
9	Rodney Tention	60	1986–87
10	Quintin Dailey	59	1980–81
	Khalil Shabazz	59	2021–22

Single game
Rk	Player	Steals	Season	Opponent
1	Tim Owens	9	1990–91	California

== Blocks ==
Career
Rk	Player	Blocks	Seasons
1	Hondre Brewer	279	1998–99 1999–00 2000–01 2001–02
2	Bill Cartwright	176	1975–76 1976–77 1977–78 1978–79
3	Wallace Bryant	170	1978–79 1979–80 1980–81 1981–82
4	Alan Wiggins Jr.	149	2003–04 2004–05 2005–06 2006–07
5	Nate Renfro	123	2015–16 2016–17 2017–18 2018–19
6	Art Wallace	121	1993–94 1994–95

Season
Rk	Player	Blocks	Season
1	Hondre Brewer	114	2000–01
2	Hondre Brewer	78	2001–02
3	Bill Cartwright	77	1978–79
4	Art Wallace	73	1993–94
5	Yauhen Massalski	70	2021–22
6	Wallace Bryant	63	1979–80
7	Alan Wiggins Jr.	58	2005–06
8	Hondre Brewer	53	1998–99
9	Art Wallace	48	1994–95
10	Wallace Bryant	46	1981–82
	Alan Wiggins Jr.	46	2006–07

Single game
Rk	Player	Blocks	Season	Opponent
1	Bill Russell	13	1953–54	California
