= San Francisco Dons =

Intercollegiate sports teams of University of San Francisco

- University: University of San Francisco
- Nickname: Dons
- NCAA: Division I
- Conference: WCC (primary); Mountain Pacific Sports Federation (women's indoor track & field)
- Athletic director: Brent Blaylock
- Location: San Francisco, California
- Varsity teams: 17 (15 in 2024–25)
- Basketball arena: War Memorial at the Sobrato Center and Chase Center
- Baseball stadium: Dante Benedetti Diamond at Max Ulrich Field
- Soccer stadium: Negoesco Stadium
- Other venues: California Tennis Club; Crissy Field; Kezar Stadium; Peacock Gap Golf Club; The Olympic Club
- Colors: Green and gold
- Mascot: The Don
- Fight song: "Victory Song"
- Website: usfdons.com
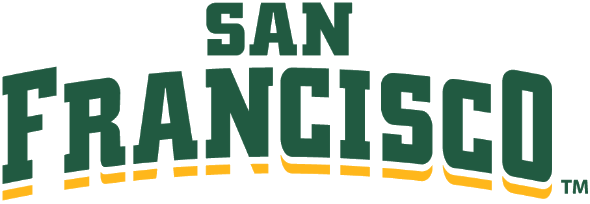

The San Francisco Dons is the nickname of the athletic teams at the University of San Francisco (USF). The Dons compete in NCAA Division I of the National Collegiate Athletic Association (NCAA) as members of the West Coast Conference (WCC), of which USF is a charter member.

== History ==
Athletics at USF dates back to its founding in 1855, when founder Anthony Maraschi, S.J. organized ball games as recreation for the first students. However, intercollegiate competition only dates back to 1907, when then-Saint Ignatius College began playing organized baseball, basketball, and rugby against other local colleges and high schools. Rivalries with neighboring Santa Clara University and Saint Mary's College of California have their origins in this early period.

Teams were originally known as the "Grey Fog", and red and blue were Saint Ignatius College's colors. However, as the college began to develop an identity distinct from the high school—the college became the University of San Francisco in 1930—it adopted green and gold as its colors in 1927 and chose the Don as its mascot in 1932. The old Saint Ignatius High School later became Saint Ignatius College Preparatory and retained the red and blue colors.

Three USF alumni participated in the 2016 Summer Olympics - Israeli long-distance runner Maor Tiyouri, basketball player John Cox and synchronized swimmer Mariya Koroleva. Tiyouri also competed in the marathon at the 2020 Tokyo Olympics in 2021.

== Sports sponsored ==
Men's sports	Women's sports
Baseball	Basketball
Basketball	Beach volleyball
Cross country	Cross country
Golf	Golf
Soccer	Soccer
Tennis (Note: USF will drop men's and women's tennis at the end of the 2023–24 school year.)	Tennis
Track and field^{1}	Track and field^{1}
	Volleyball
^{1} – includes both indoor and outdoor

=== Baseball ===
2005 was a banner year for the baseball program, as the Diamond Dons finished with a 38–18 record (the best in team history), placed eight players in the all-conference team and earned Nino Giarrantano coach of the year honors. This was followed in 2006 with a 38–21 record, the WCC conference regular season championship, and a Top 25 ranking. However, USF lost in the WCC conference championship to Pepperdine but still was given an at large berth into their first ever postseason. USF did not advance in the tournament as they were beaten by the University of Miami, and Manhattan College.

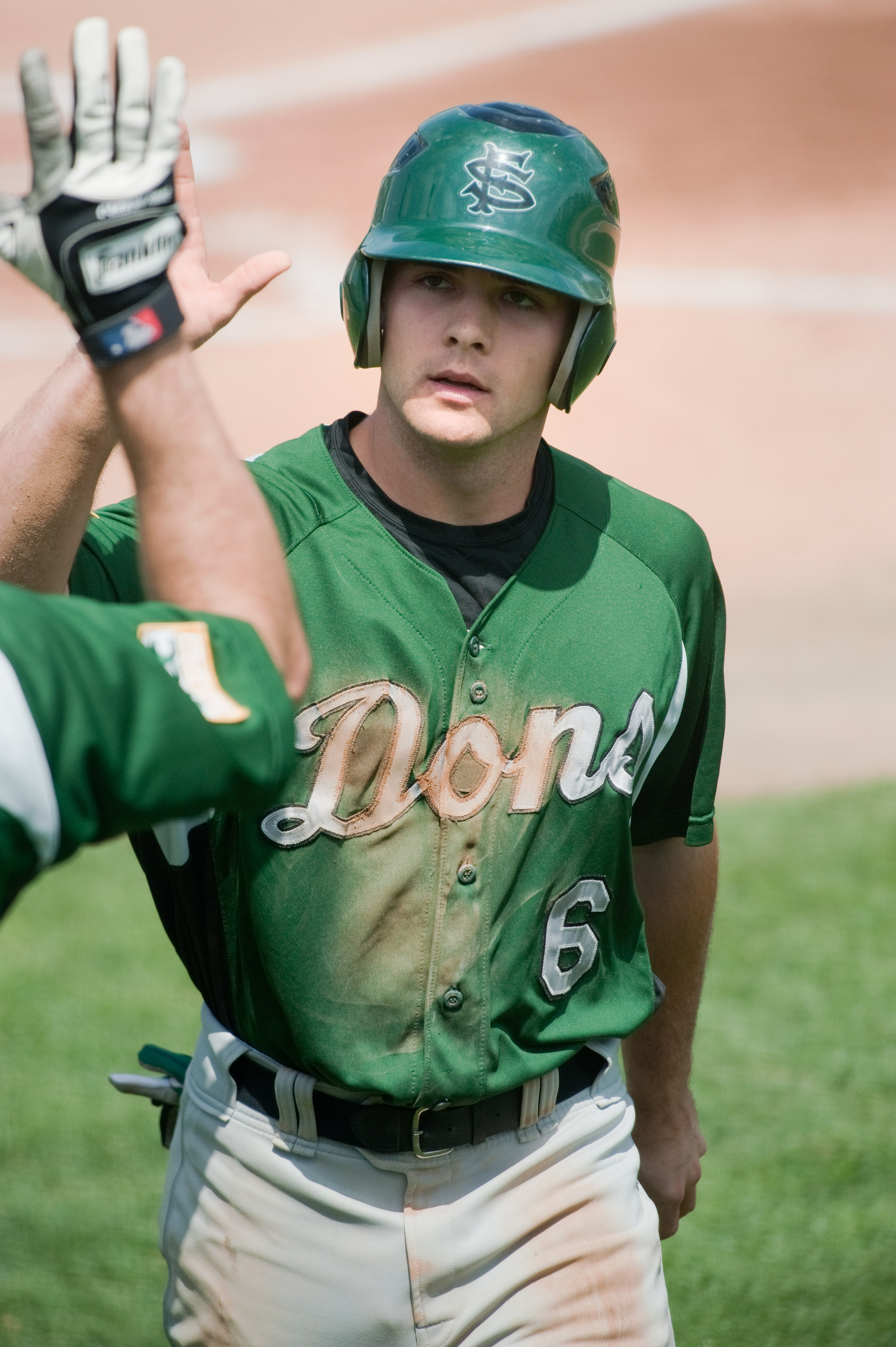
A Dons baseball player is congratulated by a teammate after scoring a run in a 2010 game

Future major leaguer Aaron Poreda pitched for the Diamond Dons, finishing his freshman 2005 season with a 2.16 ERA, the fifth-lowest in team history and third-best in the WCC, and his hits-per-9-innings ratio of 6.48 was second-best in the conference. In 2006 he posted a WCC-best 2.49 ERA. In the NCAA regional he pitched the team to a 5–1 victory over No. 6 national seed Nebraska. Poreda was drafted by the Chicago White Sox in the first round (25th overall) in the 2007 Major League Baseball draft; at the time, he was throwing a 97 miles per hour fastball.

Nino Giarrantano became head coach in 1998, previously serving as hitting coach at Arizona State University. Giarrantano was named 3-time JC National Coach of the Year and 2005–2006 WCC Coach of the Year. Since arriving at USF, the team has had its best four-year stretch in its program's history, 104-69 overall since 2004.

USF began receiving reports of sexual misconduct and psychological abuse from the baseball team in late 2021, regarding assistant coach Troy Nakamura, and fired him in January 2023. Two months later, it was reported that Nakamura was permitted access to the baseball facilities by Giarrantano, and a class action lawsuit was filed against both Nakamura and Giarrantano the following March by three anonymous players. Two days after the suit was filed, Giarrantano was fired.

Assistant coach Mat Keplinger became interim head coach, and the following season, Rob DiToma, then head coach of the Fairleigh Dickinson Knights baseball team, was hired as new head baseball coach.

==== Dante Benedetti Diamond at Max Ulrich Field ====
The Dons' home field is named after Dante Benedetti, USF's head coach from 1962 to 1980. Benedetti attended then-Saint Ignatius College from 1937 to 1940, during which he lettered in Baseball, Football, and Boxing. During his tenure as head coach, he accumulated 373 career wins and has been inducted into the university's athletic hall of fame. Also during his tenure as head coach, the university wanted to cut the program for financial reasons. However, to keep the program alive Benedetti agreed to lower his salary. For the remaining 16 years of his coaching career, he was paid $1 a year.

The field is also named after Max Ulrich, a benefactor of the University of San Francisco.

==== Drafted players ====
Over the years of USF's baseball tradition, a number of players have been drafted into professional baseball. Of these players, a few have had debuts in the Major Leagues:

Diamond Dons in Major League Baseball
Player	Years at USF	MLB Debut
Joe Giannini	1908–1911	July 8, 1911
Clarence Fieber	1932–1932	May 18, 1932
Ernie Sulik	1929–1955	April 15, 1936
Jake Caulfield	1937–1940	April 24, 1946
Neill Sheridan	1940–1944	September 19, 1948
Con Dempsey	1942–1944	April 28, 1951
Paul Schramka	1947–1950	April 14, 1953
Stan Johnson	1956–1960	August 18, 1960
Aaron Pointer	1960–1961	September 22, 1963
Mike Buskey	1968–1971	September 5, 1977
Justin Speier	1992–1993	May 27, 1998
Jermaine Clark	1995–1997	April 3, 2001
Joe Nelson	1993–1996	June 13, 2001
Jesse Foppert	1999–2001	April 14, 2003
Jeff Harris	1995–1995	April 2, 2005
Aaron Poreda	2005–2007	June 12, 2009
Scott Cousins	2004–2006	September 3, 2010
Kyle Zimmer	2010–2012	March 31, 2019
Bradley Zimmer	2012–2014	May 16, 2017
Adam Cimber	2013-2013	March 29, 2018

=== Men's basketball ===
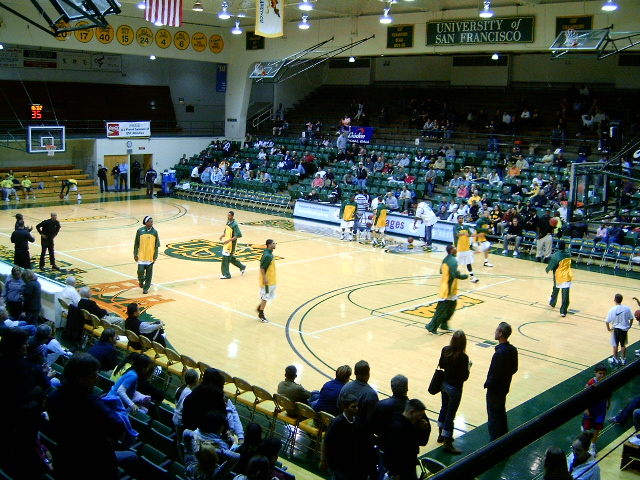
Former interior of War Memorial Gym

USF is best known for its basketball program. The men's basketball team have won three national titles: the 1949 NIT under Pete Newell and the 1955 and 1956 NCAA championships under Phil Woolpert. The latter two were led by future National Collegiate Basketball Hall of Fame and Naismith Memorial Basketball Hall of Fame members Bill Russell and K.C. Jones.

USF retained its status as a basketball powerhouse into the 1970s and early 80s, holding the distinction of being a "major" program in a "mid-major" conference (the WCC having declined somewhat in stature since the 1960s). It held the number-one spot in the polls on numerous occasions. In 1977, led by All-American center Bill Cartwright, the Dons went 29–0 and were regarded as the #1 team in the nation in both major polls before dropping their last two games.

==== Controversies ====
The Dons' prominence in the 1970s came at a price, however. The NCAA placed the Dons on probation two times in the late 1970s. Head coach Bob Gaillard was fired after the first, and an in-house inquiry after the second resulted in the firing of his successor, Dan Belluomini. It was also well known that basketball players got special treatment; many of them were marginal students at best, and at least one instance where a player threatened another student was swept under the rug by school officials. It was also common for "tutors" to take tests and write papers for players.

The situation came to a head in December 1981, when All-American guard Quintin Dailey assaulted a female student. During the subsequent investigation, Dailey admitted taking a no-show job at a business owned by a prominent non-sports USF donor. The donor had also paid Dailey $5,000 since 1980. Combined with other revelations, school president Rev. John Lo Schiavo announced on July 29, 1982, that he was suspending the basketball program—the first time a school had shut down a major sport under such circumstances. The move was applauded by several members of the coaching fraternity, as the Dailey matter revealed a program that was, in the words of San Francisco Chronicle sportswriter Glenn Dickey, "totally out of control."

LoSchiavo resurrected the program in 1985 under former star Jim Brovelli, who quickly returned the program to respectability. He was not able to reach postseason play, however, and resigned in 1995. The program has only reached the postseason twice since its revival—an NCAA berth in 1998 under Phil Mathews and a 2005 NIT berth under former coach Jessie Evans.

The program regressed the next few years, and Jessie Evans was granted a request for a 'leave of absence' on December 27, 2007. Basketball coach Eddie Sutton took over on an interim basis, needing two wins for a personal milestone of 800 career coaching victories. At the time, Bob Knight was the only other Division I men's coach to have accomplished the feat. After months of speculation, Evans was finally officially fired by USF on March 20, 2008, and a national coaching search was launched, including the use of an executive search consultant company, DHR International.

Rex Walters was named as the Dons' head coach on April 14, 2008. On March 9, 2016, after eight seasons during which the Dons were unable to do more than break even (127-127), athletic director Scott Sidwell fired Walters.

On March 30, 2016, Kyle Smith was named as the new head coach. Prior to joining USF, Smith had spent the prior six years as head coach of the Columbia University basketball team. For nine years prior to that, he was assistant coach at Saint Mary's College of California, which went to the Sweet 16 in his final year.

=== Women's basketball ===
Women's basketball also experienced recent successes, including appearances in the NCAA women's tournament in 1995, 1996, 1997, and 2016 and a WNIT berth in 2002. The 1996 season represented their best ever, as the women's team made it into the tournament's Sweet Sixteen. The team is presently coached by Molly Goodenbour.

- 2012–13 San Francisco Dons women's basketball team

San Francisco Dons basketball
Men's NCAA Championships (2)
NIT Championships (1)
Men's Conference Titles (17) * WCC Tournament title
Men's NCAA Tournament; Appearances; *Final Four appearance
Women's Conference Titles (4)
Women's NCAA Tournament appearances (4); *Sweet Sixteen appearance
1949 San Francisco Dons men's basketball NIT Champions
Record
Head coach
Players
1954–55 & 1955–56 San Francisco Dons men's basketball NCAA Champions
Record
Head coach
Players

=== Football ===
Compared to local rivals Santa Clara and Saint Mary's, USF's football teams were historically not as strong. However, the Dons entered college football lore by going undefeated in 1951 and producing three NFL hall of famers (Gino Marchetti, Ollie Matson, and Bob St. Clair). However, they did not receive a bowl invitation, as the team turned down any suggestions that they leave their two black teammates at home at the expense of a much-needed bowl bid. Due to the associated financial burden on the school that a bowl bid would have alleviated, USF's finest football team ever was its last at the major college level (now Division I FBS). Though football made a brief comeback as a Division II sport during the 1960s and 1970s, USF has not fielded a varsity team since.

Kuharich, at times, would delegate recruiting responsibilities to his freshman coach, Brad Lynn, who had little to offer prospective players in the way of scholarship inducements beyond tuition and room and board in an old ROTC barracks. However, Lynn would take recruits to the highest hill on campus, and would gesture out towards the sweeping panorama of San Francisco saying, "THIS is your campus." Only a handful of players from that 1951 team had been considered blue-ribbon prospects in high school. Two of the team's best players, Toler and guard Louis (Red) Stephens, had not even played high school football. Future Hall of Famer Marchetti was a high school dropout who had played only sparingly when he was in school.

The 1951 Dons were honored during the Fiesta Bowl in January 2008.

1951 San Francisco Dons football
Record
9-0-0 (Final AP Poll ranking: 14)
Head coach
Kuharich
Assistant coaches
Brad Lynn, Ryan, Kerr, Daly, Zanazzi
Players
Arenivar • Arnoldy • Becker • Boggan • Brown • Bruna • Carley Chess • Colombini • Conte • Cronan • Dando • Dawson • DeBernardi; Dwyer • Giorgi • Henneberry • Hillig • Holm • Huxley • Kearney; Madden • Marchetti • Matson • McLaughlin • McMahon • Mergen • Montero; Monti • Moriarity • Peacock • Retzloff • Roland • Sachs • Sakowski; Scudero • Schaeffer • Skalla • Slajchert • Springer • St. Clair • Stephens; Thiel • Thomas • Toler • Tringali • Weibel • Welsh • Whitney • Wilwerding
Sports information officer
Rozelle

=== Men's golf ===
The men's golf team has won 11 West Coast Conference championships: 1970–71, 1981–84, 1986, 1988, 1990, 2009, 2011.

=== Men's soccer ===
Men's soccer is USF's most successful program, earning five national titles, including a co-championship with Penn State in 1949. The program's successes came under alumnus Stephen Negoesco, who coached from 1962 to 2000 and led the team to 540 wins and four national championships (1966, 1975, 1976, 1980). Under Negoesco's successor, alumnus Erik Visser, the men's team earned the 2004, 2005 and 2008 WCC titles.

Alejandro Toledo, the former president of Peru, played for USF on a partial scholarship.

San Francisco Dons soccer
Men's NCAA Championships (4)
1966 • 1975 • 1976 • 1980
Men's Conference Titles (32)
1948 • 1949 • 1950 • 1951 • 1952 • 1953 • 1954; 1955 • 1956 • 1957 • 1958 • 1963 • 1965 • 1966 1971 • 1973 • 1974 • 1975 • 1976 • 1978 • 1980 1981 • 1982 • 1984 • 1987 • 1988 • 1991 • 1993 1994 • 2004 • 2005 • 2008

=== Women's cross country ===
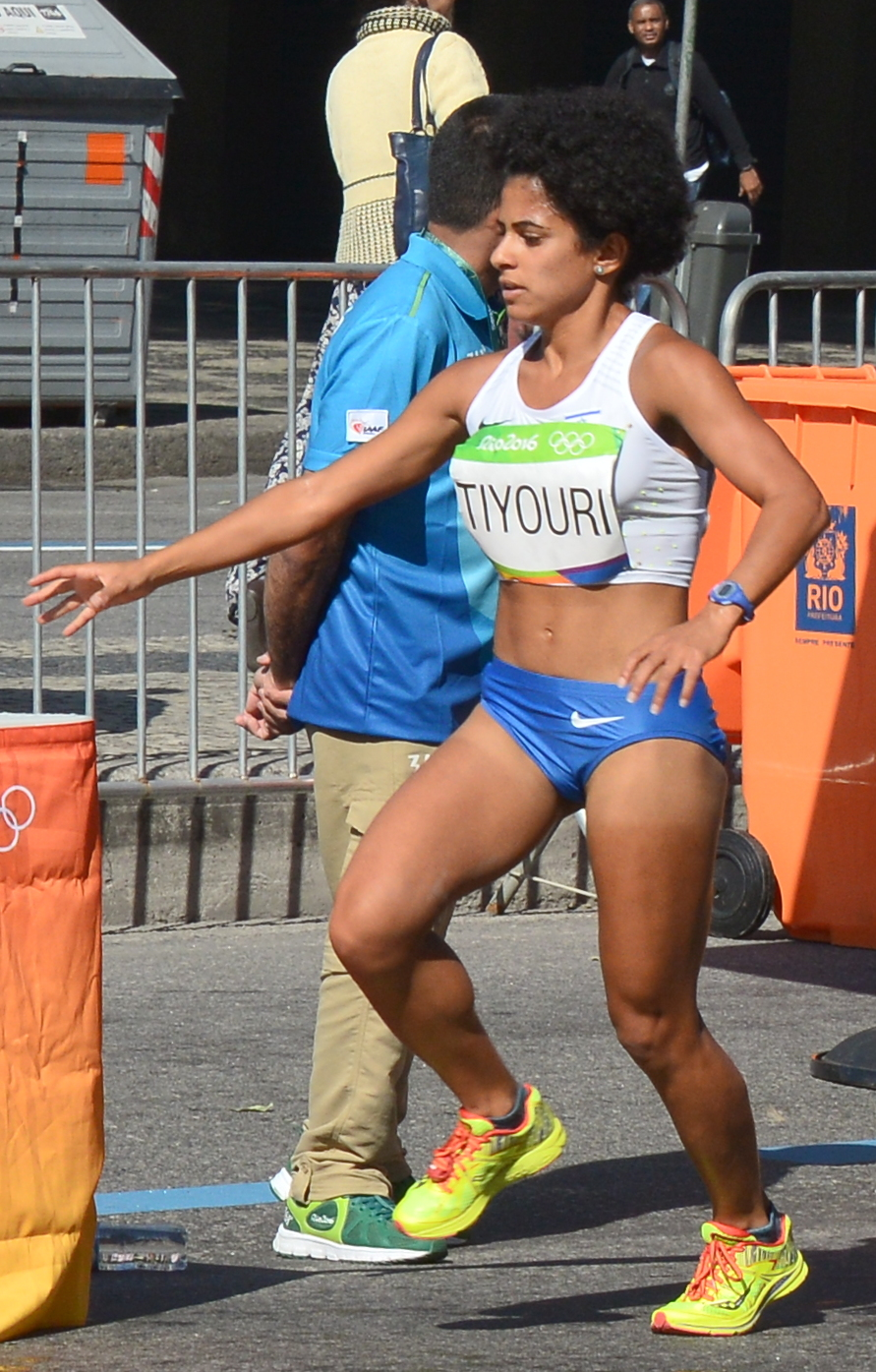
Maor Tiyouri

The Women's cross country team won four consecutive WCC championships in 2009–2012, and in 2011 made an NCAA Championship appearance. They maintained national rankings in both 2011–2012. Israeli Olympian Maor Tiyouri, who went on to run the marathon in the 2016 and 2020 Olympics, competed for the team.

=== Men's tennis ===
The men's tennis team, led by Harry Likas, Harry Roche and Arthur Larsen, won the 1949 NCAA Men's Tennis Championship. Likas also won the 1948 individual men's title.

USF announced it would drop men's and women's tennis at the end of the 2023–24 school year.

San Francisco Dons tennis
Men's NCAA Team Titles (1)
Men's NCAA Individual Titles (1)

=== Women's volleyball ===
The women's volleyball team has made two NCAA tournament appearances: in 2003, under former coach Jeff Nelson, and in 2008 under current coach Gilad Doron. The 2008 season saw the Dons finish with a Top 25 national ranking, a 22–8 record, and five all-WCC players.

San Francisco Dons volleyball
Women's NCAA; Tournament appearances (2)

== Club teams ==
USF participates in the following club sports: golf, fencing, boxing, rifle, tennis, karate, soccer and lacrosse. Rugby, which was one of the first varsity sports in school history, is currently a club sport. Football is played on the intramural level.

In 2013, USF hosted the inaugural championships of the United States Intercollegiate Boxing Association, the first national collegiate tournament in the US to include women's boxing.
