= 1977–78 San Francisco Dons men's basketball team =

American college basketball season

1977–78 San Francisco Dons men's basketball

West Coast Athletic Conference champions

NCAA Tournament, Sweet Sixteen
- Conference: West Coast Athletic Conference

Ranking
- Coaches: No. 13
- AP: No. 11
- Record: 22–7 (12–2 WCAC)
- Head coach: Bob Gaillard (8th season)
- Home arena: War Memorial Gymnasium

1977–78 West Coast Athletic Conference men's basketball standings
	Conf.				Overall
Team	W		L	PCT	W		L	PCT
No. 11 San Francisco	12	–	2	.857	23	–	6	.793
Nevada	10	–	4	.714	19	–	8	.704
Portland	9	–	6	.600	19	–	8	.704
Santa Clara	9	–	6	.600	21	–	8	.724
Seattle	6	–	8	.429	11	–	16	.407
Saint Mary's	5	–	9	.357	13	–	14	.481
Loyola Marymount	4	–	11	.267	11	–	15	.423
Pepperdine	3	–	12	.200	7	–	19	.269
Rankings from AP Poll

The 1977–78 San Francisco Dons men's basketball team represented the University of San Francisco as a member of the West Coast Athletic Conference during the 1977–78 NCAA Division I men's basketball season. The Dons opened the season with a top 5 ranking, but played all but three weeks of the season outside the top ten. San Francisco finished the season with a 23–6 record (12–2 WCAC) and a No. 11 ranking in the final AP poll. As champions of the West Coast Athletic Conference, San Francisco played in the NCAA Tournament as No. 3Q seed (automatic qualifier) in the West region where they were upset in the regional semifinal by Cal State Fullerton.

Junior center Bill Cartwright was named conference Player of the Year for the second time.

== Roster ==
1977–78 San Francisco Dons men's basketball team
Players
Coaches

Pos.	#	Name	Height	Weight	Year	Hometown
G		Winford Boynes	6 ft 6 in (1.98 m)	185 lb (84 kg)	Jr	Capitol Hill	Oklahoma City, Oklahoma
G		Chubby Cox	6 ft 2 in (1.88 m)	180 lb (82 kg)	Sr	Villanova	Philadelphia, Pennsylvania
C	24	Bill Cartwright	7 ft 1 in (2.16 m)	235 lb (107 kg)	Jr	Elk Grove, California
F	52	James Hardy	6 ft 8 in (2.03 m)	215 lb (98 kg)	Jr	Jordan	Long Beach, California

Head coach

- Bob Gaillard (San Francisco)

Assistant coach(es)

Legend

- (C) Team captain
- (S) Suspended
- (I) Ineligible
- (W) Walk-on
- Injured
- Current redshirt

== Schedule and results ==
Date time, TV	Rank^{#}	Opponent^{#}	Result	Record	Site city, state
Regular season
Nov 26, 1977*	No. 5	San Francisco State	W 100–67	1–0	War Memorial Gymnasium; San Francisco, California
Dec 2, 1977*	No. 5	vs. Tennessee; Sun Devil Classic	W 84–75	2–0	ASU Activity Center; Tempe, Arizona
Dec 3, 1977*	No. 5	at Arizona State; Sun Devil Classic	L 79–89	2–1	ASU Activity Center; Tempe, Arizona
Dec 8, 1977*	No. 8	at Stanford	W 99–78	3–1	Maples Pavilion; Stanford, California
Dec 10, 1977*	No. 8	UC Santa Barbara	W 63–57	4–1	War Memorial Gymnasium; San Francisco, California
Dec 16, 1977*	No. 11	Idaho; Golden Gate Invitational	W 109–70	5–1	Cow Palace; San Francisco, California
Dec 17, 1977*	No. 11	Baylor; Golden Gate Invitational	W 98–93	6–1	Cow Palace; San Francisco, California
Dec 22, 1977*	No. 11	California	L 89–90	6–2	War Memorial Gymnasium; San Francisco, California
Dec 23, 1977*	No. 11	Rhode Island	L 85–87	6–3	War Memorial Gymnasium; San Francisco, California
Dec 27, 1977*	No. 19	vs. Austin Peay; All-College Tournament	W 75–66	6–3	Myriad Convention Center; Oklahoma City, Oklahoma
Dec 29, 1977*	No. 19	vs. Miami (OH); All-College Tournament	W 91–88	7–3	Myriad Convention Center; Oklahoma City, Oklahoma
Dec 30, 1977*	No. 19	vs. Arizona State; All-College Tournament	W 102–90	8–3	Myriad Convention Center; Oklahoma City, Oklahoma
Jan 5, 1978	No. 19	at Nevada	L 80–82	9–4 (0–1)	Centennial Coliseum; Reno, Nevada
Jan 7, 1978	No. 19	Saint Mary's	W 111–87	10–4 (1–1)	War Memorial Gymnasium; San Francisco, California
Jan 10, 1978*		No. 5 Notre Dame	W 79–70	11–4	Oakland–Alameda County Coliseum Arena; Oakland, California
Jan 13, 1978		Portland	W 101–68	12–4 (2–1)	War Memorial Gymnasium; San Francisco, California
Jan 14, 1978		Seattle	W 93–80	13–4 (3–1)	War Memorial Gymnasium; San Francisco, California
Jan 25, 1978		at Santa Clara	W 74–66	14–4 (4–1)	Toso Pavilion; Santa Clara, California
Jan 28, 1978		Santa Clara	W 92–73	15–4 (5–1)	War Memorial Gymnasium; San Francisco, California
Feb 2, 1978	No. 20	at Portland	L 87–101	15–5 (5–2)	Howard Hall; Portland, Oregon
Feb 4, 1978		at Seattle	W 96–85	16–5 (6–2)	Seattle Center Coliseum; Seattle, Washington
Feb 10, 1978		at Pepperdine	W 85–73	17–5 (7–2)	Firestone Fieldhouse; Malibu, California
Feb 11, 1978		at Loyola Marymount	W 82–80	18–5 (8–2)	Loyola Memorial Gymnasium; Los Angeles, California
Feb 17, 1978		Loyola Marymount	W 99–71	19–5 (9–2)	War Memorial Gymnasium; San Francisco, California
Feb 18, 1978		Pepperdine	W 89–56	20–5 (10–2)	War Memorial Gymnasium; San Francisco, California
Feb 23, 1978		at Saint Mary's	W 87–81	21–5 (11–2)	McKeon Pavilion; Moraga, California
Feb 25, 1978		Nevada	W 78–73	22–5 (12–2)	War Memorial Gymnasium; San Francisco, California
NCAA Tournament
Mar 11, 1978*	(W 3Q) No. 20	vs. (W 1L) No. 11 North Carolina; First Round	W 68–64	23–5	ASU Activity Center (11,213); Tempe, Arizona
Mar 16, 1978*	(W 3Q) No. 11	vs. (W 4L) Cal State Fullerton; West Regional Semifinal – Sweet Sixteen	L 72–75	23–6	University Arena; Albuquerque, New Mexico
*Non-conference game. ^{#}Rankings from AP Poll. (#) Tournament seedings in parentheses. W=West. All times are in Pacific Time.

== Awards and honors ==
- Bill Cartwright – WCAC Player of the Year (2x)

== Team players drafted into the NBA ==
Round	Pick	Player	NBA Club
1	11	James Hardy	New Orleans Jazz
1	13	Winford Boynes	New Jersey Nets
