= List of San Francisco Dons men's basketball seasons =

This is a list of the seasons completed by the San Francisco Dons men's basketball team.

== Seasons ==
Statistics overview
Season	Coach	Overall	Conference	Standing	Postseason
James Needles (1923–1931)
1923–24	James Needles	14–4			
1924–25	James Needles	4–8			
1925–26	James Needles	8–6			
1926–27	James Needles	8–7			
1927–28	James Needles	16–5			
1928–29	James Needles	21–2			
1929–30	James Needles	9–4			
1930–31	James Needles	12–6			
James Needles:		92–42			
Phil Morrissey (1931–1932)
1931–32	Phil Morrissey	11–5			
Phil Morrissey:		11–5			
Wally Cameron (1932–1941)
1932–33	Wally Cameron	10–7			
1933–34	Wally Cameron	8–5			
1934–35	Wally Cameron	7–14			
1935–36	Wally Cameron	11–9			
1936–37	Wally Cameron	10–7			
1937–38	Wally Cameron	10–12			
1938–39	Wally Cameron	7–10			
1939–40	Wally Cameron	9–8			
1940–41	Wally Cameron	2–13			
Wally Cameron:		74–85			
Forrest Twogood (1941–1942)
1941–42	Forrest Twogood	14–10			
Forrest Twogood:		14–10			
James Needles (1942–1944)
1942–43	James Needles	13–9			
1943–44	James Needles	8–11			
James Needles:		21–20			
No basketball (1944–1945)
William Bussenius (1945–1946)
1945–46	William Bussenius	9–12			
William Bussenius:		9–12			
Pete Newell (1946–1950)
1946–47	Pete Newell	13–14			
1947–48	Pete Newell	13–11			
1948–49	Pete Newell	25–5			NIT Champion
1949–50	Pete Newell	19–7			NIT first round
Pete Newell:		70–37			
Phil Woolpert (1950–1952)
1950–51	Phil Woolpert	9–17			
1951–52	Phil Woolpert	11–13			
Phil Woolpert (California Basketball Association/West Coast Athletic Conference) (1952–1959)
1952–53	Phil Woolpert	10–11	6–2	2nd	
1953–54	Phil Woolpert	14–7	8–4	2nd	
1954–55	Phil Woolpert	28–1	12–0	1st	NCAA Champion
1955–56	Phil Woolpert	29–0	14–0	1st	NCAA Champion
1956–57	Phil Woolpert	21–7	12–2	1st	NCAA Final Four
1957–58	Phil Woolpert	25–2	12–0	1st	NCAA Regional semifinals
1958–59	Phil Woolpert	6–20	3–9	6th	
Phil Woolpert:		154–78	65–17		
Ross Guidice (West Coast Athletic Conference) (1959–1960)
1959–60	Ross Guidice	9–16	5–7	5th	
Ross Guidice:		9–16	5–7		
Peter Peletta (West Coast Athletic Conference) (1960–1966)
1960–61	Peter Peletta	17–11	8–4	T-2nd	
1961–62	Peter Peletta	9–15	4–8	6th	
1962–63	Peter Peletta	18–9	10–2	1st	NCAA Regional semifinals
1963–64	Peter Peletta	23–5	12–0	1st	NCAA regional finals
1964–65	Peter Peletta	24–5	13–1	1st	NCAA regional finals
1965–66	Peter Peletta	22–6	11–3	2nd	NIT Quarterfinals
Peter Peletta:		114–51	58–18		
Phil Vukicevich (West Coast Athletic Conference) (1966–1971)
1966–67	Phil Vukicevich	13–12	7–7	4th	
1967–68	Phil Vukicevich	16–10	10–4	3rd	
1968–69	Phil Vukicevich	7–18	3–11	6th	
1969–70	Phil Vukicevich	15–11	9–5	T-3rd	
1970–71	Phil Vukicevich; Bob Gaillard	10–16^{[Note A]}	8–6^{[Note A]}	4th	
Phil Vukicevich:		51–57	29–27		
Bob Gaillard (West Coast Athletic Conference) (1971–1978)
1971–72	Bob Gaillard	20–8	13–1	1st	NCAA Regional semifinals
1972–73	Bob Gaillard	23–5	12–2	1st	NCAA regional finals
1973–74	Bob Gaillard	19–9	12–2	1st	NCAA regional finals
1974–75	Bob Gaillard	19–7	9–5	2nd	
1975–76	Bob Gaillard	22–8	9–3	2nd	NIT first round
1976–77	Bob Gaillard	29–2	14–0	1st	NCAA round of 32
1977–78	Bob Gaillard	23–6	12–2	1st	NCAA Sweet 16
Bob Gaillard:		165–55^{[Note B]}	89–21^{[Note B]}		
Dan Belluomini (West Coast Athletic Conference) (1978–1980)
1978–79	Dan Belluomini	22–7	12–2	1st	NCAA Sweet 16
1979–80	Dan Belluomini	23–6	11–5	T-1st	
Dan Belluomini:		45–13	23–7		
Pete Berry (West Coast Athletic Conference) (1980–1982)
1980–81	Pete Berry	24–7	11–3	T-1st	NCAA first round
1981–82	Pete Berry	25–6	11–3	2nd	NCAA first round
Pete Berry:		49–13	22–6		
No basketball (1982–1985)
Jim Brovelli (West Coast Athletic Conference/West Coast Conference) (1985–1995)
1985–86	Jim Brovelli	7–21	2–12	8th	
1986–87	Jim Brovelli	16–12	6–8	T-4th	
1987–88	Jim Brovelli	13–15	5–9	T-6th	
1988–89	Jim Brovelli	16–12	6–8	T-4th	
1989–90	Jim Brovelli	8–20	4–12	6th	
1990–91	Jim Brovelli	12–17	4–10	7th	
1991–92	Jim Brovelli	13–16	4–10	T-6th	
1992–93	Jim Brovelli	19–12	8–6	4th	
1993–94	Jim Brovelli	17–11	8–6	T-2nd	
1994–95	Jim Brovelli	11–18	4–10	6th	
Jim Brovelli:		131–155	53–87		
Phil Mathews (West Coast Conference) (1995–2004)
1995–96	Phil Mathews	16–11	8–6	T-3rd	
1996–97	Phil Mathews	16–13	9–5	T-3rd	
1997–98	Phil Mathews	19–11	7–7	T-4th	NCAA first round
1998–99	Phil Mathews	12–18	4–10	7th	
1999–00	Phil Mathews	19–9	7–7	5th	
2000–01	Phil Mathews	12–18	5–9	5th	
2001–02	Phil Mathews	13–15	8–6	T-3rd	
2002–03	Phil Mathews	15–14	9–5	3rd	
2003–04	Phil Mathews	17–14	7–7	4th	
Phil Mathews:		138–124	64–62		
Jessie Evans (West Coast Conference) (2004–2008)
2004–05	Jessie Evans	17–14	6–8	T-5th	NIT first round
2005–06	Jessie Evans	11–17	7–7	4th	
2006–07	Jessie Evans	13–18	8–6	T-3rd	
2007–08	Jessie Evans; Eddie Sutton	10–21^{[Note C]}	5–9^{[Note C]}	5th	
Jessie Evans:		45–57	26–30		
Rex Walters (West Coast Conference) (2008–2016)
2008–09	Rex Walters	11–19	3–11	7th	
2009–10	Rex Walters	12–18	7–7	T-4th	
2010–11	Rex Walters	19–15	10–4	3rd	CIT Quarterfinals
2011–12	Rex Walters	20–14	8–8	T-5th	CBI first round
2012–13	Rex Walters	15–16	7–9	T-5th	
2013–14	Rex Walters	21–12	13–5	3rd	NIT first round
2014–15	Rex Walters	14–18	7–11	6th	
2015–16	Rex Walters	15–15	8–10	5th	
Rex Walters:		126–125	63–65		
Kyle Smith (West Coast Conference) (2016–2019)
2016–17	Kyle Smith	20–13	10–8	T-4th	CBI first round
2017–18	Kyle Smith	22–17	9–9	T-4th	CBI Runner-up
2018–19	Kyle Smith	21–10	9–7	T-4th	
Kyle Smith:		63–40	28–24		
Todd Golden (West Coast Conference) (2019–2022)
2019–20	Todd Golden	22–12	9–7	5th	No postseason
2020–21	Todd Golden	11–14	4–9	8th	
2021–22	Todd Golden	24–10	10–6	4th	NCAA Division I Round of 64
Todd Golden:		57–36	23–22		
Chris Gerlufsen (West Coast Conference) (2022–present)
2022–23	Chris Gerlufsen	20–14	7–9	T-5th	
2023–24	Chris Gerlufsen	23–11	11–5	3rd	NIT First Round
2024–25	Chris Gerlufsen	25–10	13–5	3rd	NIT Second Round
2025–26	Chris Gerlufsen	17–16	8–10	T–5th	
Chris Gerlufsen:		85–51	40–29		
Total:		1,550–1,106 (.584)			
National champion Postseason invitational champion Conference regular season champion Conference regular season and conference tournament champion Division regular season champion Division regular season and conference tournament champion Conference tournament champion

^A. Phil Vukicevich coached the first 6 games of the season, going 0–6. Interim coach Bob Gaillard went 10–10 and 8–6 in conference.
^B. Includes Bob Gaillard's 10–10 record and 8–6 in conference from 1970–71.
^C. Jessie Evans coached the first 12 games of the season, going 4–8. Interim coach Eddie Sutton went 6–13 and 5–9 in conference.
