= 1980–81 San Francisco Dons men's basketball team =

American college basketball season

1980–81 San Francisco Dons men's basketball

West Coast Athletic Conference champions

NCAA Tournament
- Conference: West Coast Athletic Conference
- Record: 24–7 (11–3 WCAC)
- Head coach: Peter Barry
- Home arena: War Memorial Gymnasium

1980–81 West Coast Athletic Conference men's basketball standings
	Conf.				Overall
Team	W		L	PCT	W		L	PCT
San Francisco	11	–	3	.786	23	–	7	.767
Pepperdine	11	–	3	.786	16	–	11	.593
Gonzaga	9	–	5	.643	19	–	8	.704
Portland	7	–	7	.500	17	–	10	.630
Santa Clara	7	–	7	.500	14	–	13	.519
Loyola Marymount	5	–	9	.357	9	–	19	.321
San Diego	3	–	11	.214	10	–	16	.385
Saint Mary's	3	–	11	.214	9	–	18	.333
Rankings from AP Poll

The 1980–81 San Francisco Dons men's basketball team represented the University of San Francisco as a member of the West Coast Athletic Conference during the 1980–81 NCAA Division I men's basketball season. The Dons finished the season with a 24–7 record (11–3 WCAC) and received a bid to the NCAA Tournament as No. 9 seed in the West region.

== Roster ==
1980–81 San Francisco Dons men's basketball team
Players
Coaches

Pos.	#	Name	Height	Weight	Year	Hometown
G		Quintin Dailey	6 ft 3 in (1.91 m)	175 lb (79 kg)	So	Baltimore, Maryland
	44	Ken McAlister	6 ft 5 in (1.96 m)	210 lb (95 kg)	Jr	Oakland, California
C	34	Wallace Bryant	7 ft 0 in (2.13 m)	230 lb (104 kg)	Jr	Gary, Indiana

Head coach

- Peter Barry (San Francisco)

Assistant coach(es)

Legend

- (C) Team captain
- (S) Suspended
- (I) Ineligible
- (W) Walk-on
- Injured
- Current redshirt

== Schedule and results ==
Date time, TV	Rank^{#}	Opponent^{#}	Result	Record	Site city, state
Regular season
Dec 1, 1980*		at Dayton	L 83–84	0–1	University of Dayton Arena; Dayton, Ohio
Dec 6, 1980*		at Hawaii	W 98–95	1–1	Neal S. Blaisdell Center; Honolulu, Hawaii
Dec 16, 1980*		Georgia Southern	W 91–70	2–1	War Memorial Gymnasium; San Francisco, California
Dec 19, 1980*		UC Irvine	W 93–83	3–1	War Memorial Gymnasium; San Francisco, California
Dec 20, 1980*		Duquesne; Golden Gate Tournament	W 91–83 ^{OT}	4–1	War Memorial Gymnasium; San Francisco, California
Dec 23, 1980*		New Mexico State	W 93–78	5–1	War Memorial Gymnasium; San Francisco, California
Dec 28, 1980*		vs. Villanova	L 66–93	5–2	Special Events Center; El Paso, Texas
Dec 29, 1980*		vs. Miami (OH)	W 65–60	6–2	Special Events Center; El Paso, Texas
Jan 13, 1981*		No. 7 Notre Dame	W 66–63	7–2	War Memorial Gymnasium; San Francisco, California
NCAA Tournament
Mar 12, 1981*	(9 W)	vs. (8 W) Kansas State; First round	L 60–64	24–7	Pauley Pavilion; Los Angeles, California
*Non-conference game. ^{#}Rankings from AP Poll. (#) Tournament seedings in parentheses. W=West. All times are in Pacific Time.

== Awards and honors ==
- Quintin Dailey – WCAC Player of the Year
