= Nate Renfro =

American men's basketball player

No. 15 – Pallacanestro Varese
- Position: Center
- League: LBA; Champions League

Personal information
- Born: December 11, 1996 (age 29) Tucson, Arizona, U.S.
- Listed height: 6 ft 8 in (2.03 m)
- Listed weight: 205 lb (93 kg)

Career information
- High school: Sahuaro (Tucson, Arizona)
- College: San Francisco (2015–2019)
- NBA draft: 2019: undrafted
- Playing career: 2020–present

Career history
- 2020–2022: Austin Spurs
- 2022–2023: PAOK
- 2023–2024: Peristeri
- 2024–2025: Dinamo Sassari
- 2025–present: Varese

Career highlights
- Greek League Most Spectacular Player (2023); Greek League blocks leader (2023); Greek League All-Star (2023); Greek League All-Star Game Slam Dunk Champion (2023)
- Stats at NBA.com
- Stats at Basketball Reference

Nathaneal Jordan Renfro (born December 11, 1996) is an American professional basketball player for Pallacanestro Varese of the Lega Basket Serie A (LBA). He played college basketball at the University of San Francisco.

== Early life and high school career ==
Renfro was born in Tucson, Arizona, in the United States. He attended Sahuaro High School, in Tucson. While at Sahuaro, he played high school basketball with the school's boys team. During his high school playing career, he was selected to AllSportsTucson.com's The Five Boys Division II All-Stars team, the Arizona Daily Star's All-Southern Arizona First Team, and to AZSsports360.com's All-Section First Team.

== College career ==
After high school, Renfro attended the University of San Francisco, where he played college basketball at the NCAA Division I level. He played with the school's men's basketball team, the San Francisco Dons, from 2015 to 2019. In 2017, Renfro was named to the Las Vegas Classic's All-Tournament Team.

Renfro averaged 7.3 points, 5.0 rebounds, 1.6 assists, 0.9 steals, and 1.0 blocks per game in his senior college season. Renfro finished his college playing career with the Dons, in fifth place on the school's all-time blocked shots list, and he also played in a total of 132 games, which is a school record.

== Professional career ==
=== Austin Spurs (2020–2022) ===
After college, Renfro began his professional career in the 2020–21 season, with the Austin Spurs of the NBA G League. He averaged 4.4 points, 5.3 rebounds, 3.8 assists, 1.4 steals, and 1.9 blocks per game, during the NBA G League 2020–21 season. Renfro then played in the 2021 NBA Summer League with the San Antonio Spurs' summer league team. On 1 October 2021, Renfro signed an Exhibit 10 training camp contract with the NBA's San Antonio Spurs. However, he was waived by the Spurs on 4 October 2021.

He then returned to the Spurs' NBA G-League affiliate, the Austin Spurs, for the 2021–22 season. He averaged 3.6 points, 3.0 rebounds, 1.0 assists, 0.7 steals, and 1.0 blocks per game, during the NBA G League 2021–22 season.

=== PAOK Thessaloniki (2022–2023) ===
Renfro signed with the Greek Basket League club PAOK Thessaloniki, on 3 April 2022. He averaged 6.1 points, 5.7 rebounds, 1.3 assists, 1.0 steals, and 2.0 blocks per game, in 7 games played in the Greek Basket League 2021–22 season. Renfro re-signed with PAOK, for the 2022–23 season. He averaged 6.7 points, 6.2 rebounds, 3.2 assists, 1.5 steals, and 1.5 blocks per game, in 30 games played in the Greek Basket League 2022–23 season, and 6.0 points, 4.3 rebounds, 2.4 assists, 1.5 steals, and 1.3 blocks per game, in 8 games played in the FIBA Champions League 2022–23 season. Renfro was named the Greek Basket League 2022–23 season's Most Spectacular Player, which is an award that is given to the player that was voted to have had the most impressive highlight plays of the season, which are usually slam dunk highlights.

=== Peristeri (2023–2024) ===
Renfro appeared in the 2023 NBA Summer League with the Los Angeles Clippers summer league team. On 28 July 2023, Renfro signed with the Greek club Peristeri, of the European-wide secondary competition, the FIBA Champions League.

=== Dinamo Sassari (2024–2025) ===
On June 19, 2024, he signed with Dinamo Sassari of the Lega Basket Serie A (LBA).

=== Pallacanestro Varese (2025–present) ===
On July 20, 2025, he signed with Pallacanestro Varese of the Lega Basket Serie A (LBA).
