= Forward-center =

Basketball position

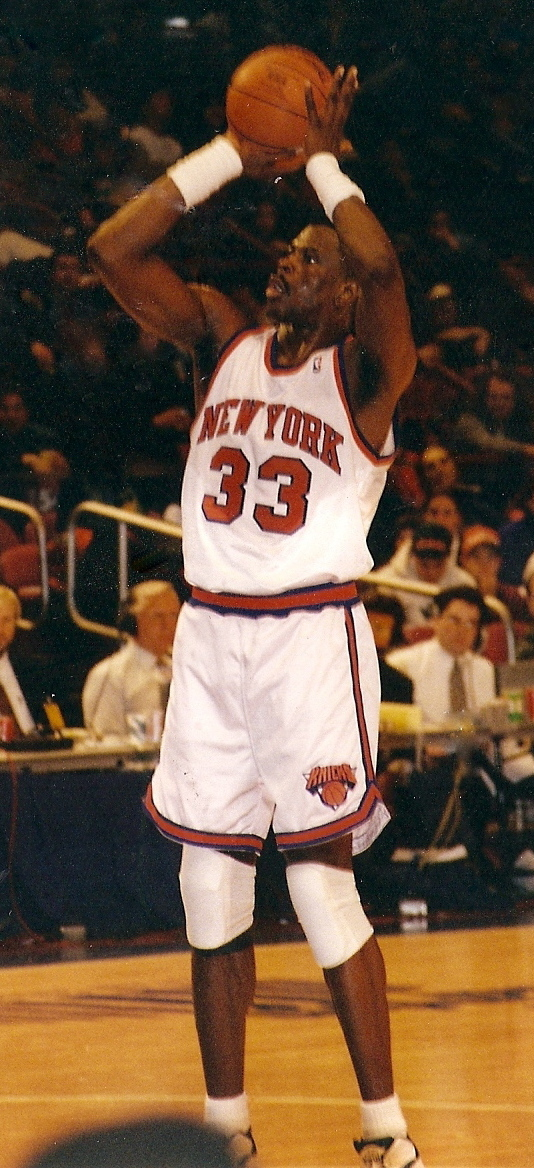
Patrick Ewing.

Forward–center is a basketball position for players who play or have played both forward and center on a consistent basis. Typically, this means power forward and center, since these are usually the two tallest player positions on any basketball team, and therefore more often overlap each other.

== Development and role ==
Forward–center came into the basketball jargon as the game evolved and became more specialized in the 1960s. The five positions on court were originally known only as guards, forwards, and the center, but it is now generally accepted that the five primary positions are point guard, shooting guard, small forward, power forward, and center.

Typically, a forward–center is a talented forward who also came to play minutes at center on teams that need help at that position. The player could also be a somewhat floor-bound center, under 7 ft 0 in (213 cm) tall at the NBA level, whose skills suit him to a power forward position, especially if that team has a better center.

== Examples of notable forward-centers ==
At 6 ft 11 in (211 cm), Marcus Camby typically played center. However, during his first tenure with the New York Knicks, he mostly played power forward as the Knicks had one of the best pure centers in the NBA with 7 ft 0 in (213 cm) Patrick Ewing. Ewing himself also played forward-center early in his career to complement the then-incumbent Knicks center, 7 ft 1 in (216 cm) Bill Cartwright. Fellow Knicks legend Willis Reed was moved to the forward–center position when the team acquired fellow center Walt Bellamy in 1965; Reed moved back to center in 1968 after the Knicks traded Bellamy to the Detroit Pistons for Dave DeBusschere. Ralph Sampson, at 7 ft 4 in (224 cm), was another notable forward–center who played center his rookie year in 1983. In 1984, he moved to power forward when 7 ft 0 in (213 cm) Hakeem Olajuwon was drafted that year.

Most forward-centers range from 6 ft 9 in (2.06 m) to 7 ft 0 in (2.13 m) in height. In terms of modern centers, Nikola Jokić is widely considered the best. Standing at 6 ft 11 in, Jokić is known for his touch off the glass, and excellent guard-like passing ability, with the reputation as the greatest passing "big man." Drafted in the second round of the 2014 draft class during a Taco Bell commercial, Jokić has proven to be one of the best centers in NBA history with 6 All-Star appearances, 6 All-NBA appearances, 3 league MVP awards, and a Finals MVP for leading the Denver Nuggets to their first championship in 2023.

== See also ==
- Tweener
