= Orlando Smart =

American basketball player

Personal information
- Born: June 19, 1971 (age 55)
- Listed height: 6 ft 1 in (1.85 m)

Career information
- High school: Crockett (Austin, Texas)
- College: San Francisco (1990–1994)
- NBA draft: 1994: undrafted
- Playing career: 1994–1998
- Position: Point guard

Career history
- 1994–1995, 1996–1997: Śląsk Wrocław
- 1997–1998: Austin Cyclones

Career highlights
- Southwest Basketball League MVP (1998); 2× First-team All-WCC (1993, 1994)

Orlando Smart (born June 19, 1971) is an American former basketball player best known for his collegiate career at the University of San Francisco. Between 1990–91 and 1993–94 he recorded 902 assists, which is in the top 25 all-time in NCAA Division I history. As a sophomore, he was third in the nation in assists per game (apg) with 8.3, as a freshman he was fourth with 8.2, and as a junior he was seventh with 7.1 apg. In each of his four seasons Smart compiled over 200 assists, whereas no other player at USF has ever recorded a single 200+ assist season. Smart also scored 1,532 points and had 279 steals during his career; his steals total ranks second in USF history.

After college he had an international professional career, including a stint in Poland for Śląsk Wrocław. He also played in the short-lived Southwest Basketball League in the United States and was its 1997–98 league MVP.

== See also ==
- List of NCAA Division I men's basketball career assists leaders
