= Ken McAlister =

American football player (born 1960)

No. 48, 94
- Positions: Linebacker, safety

Personal information
- Born: April 15, 1960 (age 66); Oakland, California, U.S.
- Listed height: 6 ft 5 in (1.96 m)
- Listed weight: 220 lb (100 kg)

Career information
- High school: Oakland
- College: San Francisco (basketball)
- NFL draft: 1982: undrafted

Career history
- Seattle Seahawks (1982–1983); San Francisco 49ers (1983); Kansas City Chiefs (1984–1987)
- Stats at Pro Football Reference

Kenneth H. McAlister (born April 15, 1960) is an American former professional football player who played five seasons in the National Football League (NFL) with the Seattle Seahawks, San Francisco 49ers and Kansas City Chiefs. He played college basketball at the University of San Francisco. He did not play college football.

== Early life and college ==
Kenneth H. McAlister was born on April 15, 1960, in Oakland, California. He played high school football, basketball, and baseball at Oakland High School. He earned third-team Parade All-American honors in basketball as a senior. McAlister was also the Oakland Athletic League defensive player of the year in football as a senior.

In April 1978, McAlister signed a national letter of intent to play college basketball for the San Francisco Dons of the University of San Francisco. He had also been recruited by Notre Dame and Michigan State but decided to stay in the Bay Area. He played four years of basketball for the Dons from 1978 to 1981. He averaged 12.4 points and 5.4 rebounds per game his senior year.

== Professional career ==
McAlister went undrafted in the 1982 NBA draft. However, he was signed by the Seattle Seahawks of the NFL on April 30, 1982, despite not having played football since high school. He played in nine games for the Seahawks in 1982, recovering one fumble while also returning two kicks for 41 yards. McAlister appeared in two games in 1983, returning three kicks for 59 yards, before being released on September 14, 1983. He was listed as a safety during his time with the Seahawks and mainly played special teams.

McAlister signed with the San Francisco 49ers on November 23, 1983. He played in four games for the 49ers that season before being released on December 30, 1983.

McAlister was signed by the Kansas City Chiefs on February 1, 1984. He was moved to linebacker while with the Chiefs. He played in 15 games, starting nine, during the 1984 season, totaling four sacks, two interceptions, and one fumble recovery. He was placed on injured reserve on August 19, 1985, and missed the entire 1985 season. He started the first three games of the 1986 season, posting one sack, before being placed on injured reserve on September 23 and missing the remainder of the year. McAlister became a free agent after the 1986 season and re-signed with the Chiefs. He was placed on the reserve/physically unable to perform list on September 7, 1987. He was activated later that season and played in one game for the Chiefs before being placed on injured reserve again on November 18, 1987. He became a free agent after the season.
