= Alan Wiggins Jr. =

American basketball player

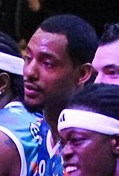
- Wiggins at the SuperLeague All-Star Game in 2011

Personal information
- Born: July 19, 1985 (age 41) San Diego, California, U.S.
- Listed height: 6 ft 8 in (2.03 m)
- Listed weight: 225 lb (102 kg)

Career information
- High school: Horizon Christian (San Diego, California)
- College: San Francisco (2003–2007)
- NBA draft: 2007: undrafted
- Playing career: 2007–2022
- Position: Power forward / small forward

Career history
- 2007–2009: Cholet Basket
- 2009–2010: Steaua București
- 2010–2011: Politekhnika-Halychyna
- 2011: Whampoa
- 2011: Anyang KGC
- 2012: Antwerp Giants
- 2012: STB Le Havre
- 2012–2013: BC Dnipro-Azot
- 2013–2014: Chiba Jets Funabashi
- 2014–2015: Best Balıkesir
- 2015–2016: BK Ventspils
- 2017: Adelaide 36ers
- 2018: Dzūkija
- 2018–2019: Soproni KC
- 2021–2022: Posušje

Career highlights
- French Leaders Cup winner (2008); First-team All-WCC (2007)

Alan Anthony Wiggins Jr. (born July 19, 1985) is an American former professional basketball player. He played college basketball for the San Francisco Dons.

== High school and college career ==
Wiggins attended Horizon Christian High School in San Diego, California. He won a state championship during his senior season and averaged 19.7 points, 11.3 rebounds and 4 blocks per game.

Wiggins played college basketball for the San Francisco Dons from 2003 to 2007. He became a starter during his sophomore season and led the team in blocks. Wiggins increased his scoring output during his junior season while he led the West Coast Conference (WCC) in blocks with 2.1 per game. He was named to the first-team All-WCC and won the Father William Dunne Award as the team's most valuable player in his senior season.

== Professional career ==
Wiggins began his career with the semiprofessional Tri Valley Titans of the International Basketball League (IBL). He was selected as the final pick of the 2007 Continental Basketball Association (CBA) draft by the Yakima SunKings but opted to start his professional career with Cholet Basket of the French LNB Pro A. Wiggins won the LNB Pro A Leaders Cup with Cholet during the 2007–08 season.

Wiggins played for BC Dnipro-Azot of the Ukrainian Basketball SuperLeague during the 2012–13 season and led the team in points and rebounds. On August 9, 2013, he signed with the Chiba Jets Funabashi of the Japanese B.League.

On October 12, 2017, Wiggins signed with the Adelaide 36ers of the Australian National Basketball League (NBL). He broke his arm during his debut game and was replaced by Josh Childress.

On August 8, 2018, Wiggins signed with Soproni KC of the Nemzeti Bajnokság I/A.

In October 2021, Wiggins signed with HKK Posušje who play in the Bosnian First Division

On January 7, 2023, Wiggins signed with KB Ponte Prizreni of the Kosovo Basketball Superleague. When he arrived in Kosovo, he underwent surgery because of "several health complaints." On January 12, Ponte Prizreni announced that Wiggins would leave the team without playing a game.

== Personal life ==
Wiggins is the son of professional baseball player Alan Wiggins and the brother of Women's National Basketball Association player Candice Wiggins. Another sister, Cassandra, played college basketball for the NYU Violets.
