= Chris Gerlufsen =

American basketball coach (born 1976)

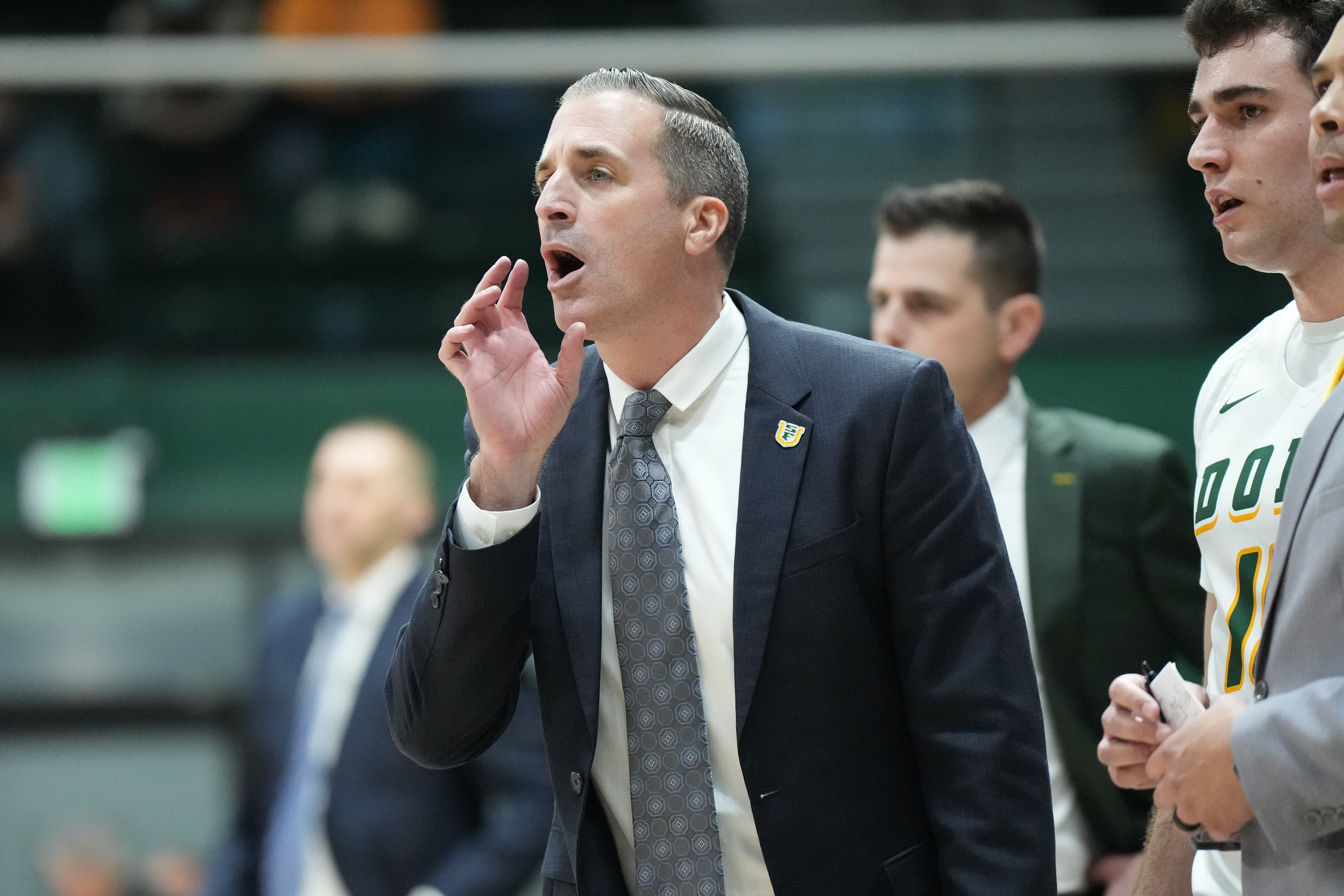
- Gerlufsen coaching at the University of San Francisco in 2022

Current position
- Title: Head coach
- Team: San Francisco
- Conference: WCC
- Record: 88–52 (.629)

Biographical details
- Born: September 16, 1976 (age 50); Philadelphia, Pennsylvania, U.S.

Playing career
- 1994–1998: Randolph–Macon
- Position: Guard

Coaching career (HC unless noted)
- 1998–1999: Washington College (GA)
- 1999–2000: Southwestern (KS) (assistant)
- 2000–2002: The Citadel (GA)
- 2002–2006: The Citadel (assistant)
- 2006–2013: Hartford (assistant)
- 2013–2015: Hartford (assoc. HC)
- 2015–2019: San Diego (assistant)
- 2019–2021: Hawaii (assistant)
- 2021–2022: San Francisco (assoc. HC)
- 2022–present: San Francisco

Head coaching record
- Overall: 96–57 (.627)
- Tournaments: 1–2 (NIT)

Chris Gerlufsen (born September 16, 1976) is an American college basketball coach who is the head coach of the San Francisco Dons men's basketball team. He served as the acting head coach for Hawaii during their 2019–20 season while head coach Eran Ganot took a leave of medical absence, compiling an 8–5 record during that period.

== Early life and college ==
Gerlufsen is a native of Philadelphia, and the son of former University of Massachusetts head coach Ron Gerlufsen.

Gerlufsen played at Randolph–Macon College in Ashland, Virginia where he was a guard and a captain on teams that made the NCAA Division III tournament twice. Gerlufsen graduated from Randolph–Macon with a degree in business and economics in 1998.

== Coaching career ==
=== Early coaching career ===
Gerlufsen began his coaching career at Washington College in Maryland as a graduate assistant in 1998, before spending a season at Southwestern. He joined The Citadel in 2000, where he was a graduate assistant for a year before joining the staff full-time in 2001. He was promoted to lead assistant before the start of the 2003–04 season. He left after the 2005–06 season to join the coaching staff at Hartford.

=== Hartford ===
Gerlufsen spent seven years as an assistant coach at Hartford before being promoted to associate head coach at the start of the 2013–14 season. He also served as the team's recruiting coordinator during his tenure there.

=== San Diego ===
On April 28, 2015, it was announced that Gerlufsen would be joining the University of San Diego's men's basketball program as an assistant coach. He spent four seasons there, three as an assistant on Lamont Smith's staff, and one year as an assistant on Sam Scholl's staff, where he was instrumental in turning a 9 win team into a 21 win team. Gerlufsen left after the 2018–19 season to join the coaching staff at Hawaii.

=== Hawaii ===
Gerlufsen was introduced as the new assistant coach for Hawaii on September 3, 2019, serving as the team's lead assistant and de facto offensive coordinator. On November 6, he was named acting head coach after head coach Eran Ganot took a medical leave of absence. He compiled an 8–5 record as acting head coach, relinquishing head coaching duties on December 28 when Ganot returned from medical leave.

=== San Francisco ===
Gerlufsen joined San Francisco in 2021 as their associate head coach. After Todd Golden's departure to take the head coaching position at Florida, Gerlufsen was elevated to head coach.

== Head coaching record ==
Record table
Season	Team	Overall	Conference	Standing	Postseason
Hawaii Rainbow Warriors (Big West Conference) (2019)
2019–20	Hawaii	8–5 (Note: Served as acting head coach from November 6, 2019, to December 28, 2019, due to head coach Eran Ganot's medical leave of absence.)			
Hawaii:		8–5 (.615)			
San Francisco Dons (West Coast Conference) (2022–present)
2022–23	San Francisco	20–14	7–9	T–5th	
2023–24	San Francisco	23–11	11–5	3rd	NIT First Round
2024–25	San Francisco	25–10	13–5	3rd	NIT Second Round
2025–26	San Francisco	17–16	8–10	T–5th	
2026–27	San Francisco	3–1	0–0		
San Francisco:		88–52 (.629)	39–29 (.574)		
Total:		96–57 (.627)			
