= Bob Gaillard =

American former college basketball coach and businessman

Biographical details
- Born: October 23, 1940 (age 86); Contra Costa County, California, U.S.

Playing career
- 1959–1962: San Francisco

Coaching career (HC unless noted)
- 1968–1970: San Francisco (assistant)
- 1970–1978: San Francisco
- 1989–2011: Lewis & Clark

Administrative career (AD unless noted)
- 1971–1978: San Francisco

Head coaching record
- Overall: 530–288
- Tournaments: 4–5 (NCAA University Division / Division I); 0–1 (NIT); 7–5 (NAIA Division II); 5–3 (NCAA Division III)

Accomplishments and honors

Championships
- 5 WCAC regular season (1972–1974, 1977, 1978); 5 NWC regular season (1994, 1995, 2000, 2002, 2007)

Awards
- AP Coach of the Year (1977); UPI Coach of the Year (1977); 2× WCAC Coach of the Year (1972, 1977); 3× NWC Coach of the Year (1994, 1998, 2000)

Robert Louis Gaillard (born October 23, 1940) is an American former college basketball coach and businessman. He coached the San Francisco Dons as an assistant beginning in 1968, and became head coach in the 1970–71 season. Under Gaillard, the Dons finished 29–2 in the 1976–77 season, which saw them ranked number one in the nation for much of the year. In 1977 he was recognized as the Associated Press College Basketball Coach of the Year.

After leaving San Francisco, Gaillard worked for several years in the private sector, becoming director of sales and advertising for the San Francisco Giants in 1981.

He was the men's basketball head coach at Lewis & Clark College from 1989 to 2011. He was succeeded by Dinari Foreman. The Pioneers gave Gaillard his 500th career victory in 2009.

He is a 1958 graduate of Harry Ells High School in Richmond, California.

== Head coaching record ==
Record table
Season	Team	Overall	Conference	Standing	Postseason
San Francisco Dons (West Coast Athletic Conference) (1970–1978)
1970–71	San Francisco	10–16	8–6	T–4th	
1971–72	San Francisco	20–8	13–1	1st	NCAA University Division Regional Semifinals
1972–73	San Francisco	23–5	12–2	1st	NCAA University Division Elite Eight
1973–74	San Francisco	19–9	12–2	1st	NCAA Division I Elite Eight
1974–75	San Francisco	19–7	9–5	2nd	
1975–76	San Francisco	22–8	9–3	2nd	NIT First Round
1976–77	San Francisco	29–2	14–0	1st	NCAA Division I First Round
1977–78	San Francisco	23–6	12–2	1st	NCAA Division I Sweet 16
San Francisco:		165–61	89–21		
Lewis & Clark Pioneers (Northwest Conference) (1989–2011)
1989–90	Lewis & Clark	10–18	0–12	7th	
1990–91	Lewis & Clark	8–19	1–11	7th	
1991–92	Lewis & Clark	16–11	5–7	T–4th	
1992–93	Lewis & Clark	18–8	6–6	4th	
1993–94	Lewis & Clark	23–9	10–2	T–1st	NAIA Division II Semifinal
1994–95	Lewis & Clark	17–14	8–4	T–1st	NAIA Division II Second Round
1995–96	Lewis & Clark	17–10	9–5	2nd	NAIA Division II Second Round
1996–97	Lewis & Clark	22–6	12–4	2nd	NAIA Division II Second Round
1997–98	Lewis & Clark	22–7	13–5	T–2nd	NAIA Division II Quarterfinal
1998–99	Lewis & Clark	15–10	10–8	5th	
1999–00	Lewis & Clark	21–6	15–1	1st	
2000–01	Lewis & Clark	21–7	13–3	2nd	NCAA Division III Second Round
2001–02	Lewis & Clark	24–6	13–3	1st	NCAA Division III Sectional Semifinal
2002–03	Lewis & Clark	16–10	11–5	3rd	NCAA Division III Sectional Championship
2003–04	Lewis & Clark	15–10	8–8	5th	
2004–05	Lewis & Clark	11–13	7–9	6th	
2005–06	Lewis & Clark	11–13	7–9	5th	
2006–07	Lewis & Clark	19–7	13–3	T–1st	
2007–08	Lewis & Clark	15–9	9–7	T–3rd	
2008–09	Lewis & Clark	16–10	10–6	T–3rd	
2009–10	Lewis & Clark	10–16	9–7	T–3rd	
2010–11	Lewis & Clark	18–8	11–5	T–2nd	
Lewis & Clark:		365–227	200–130		
Total:		530–288			
National champion Postseason invitational champion Conference regular season champion Conference regular season and conference tournament champion Division regular season champion Division regular season and conference tournament champion Conference tournament champion
