= John Cox (basketball, born 1981) =

Venezuelan-American basketball player

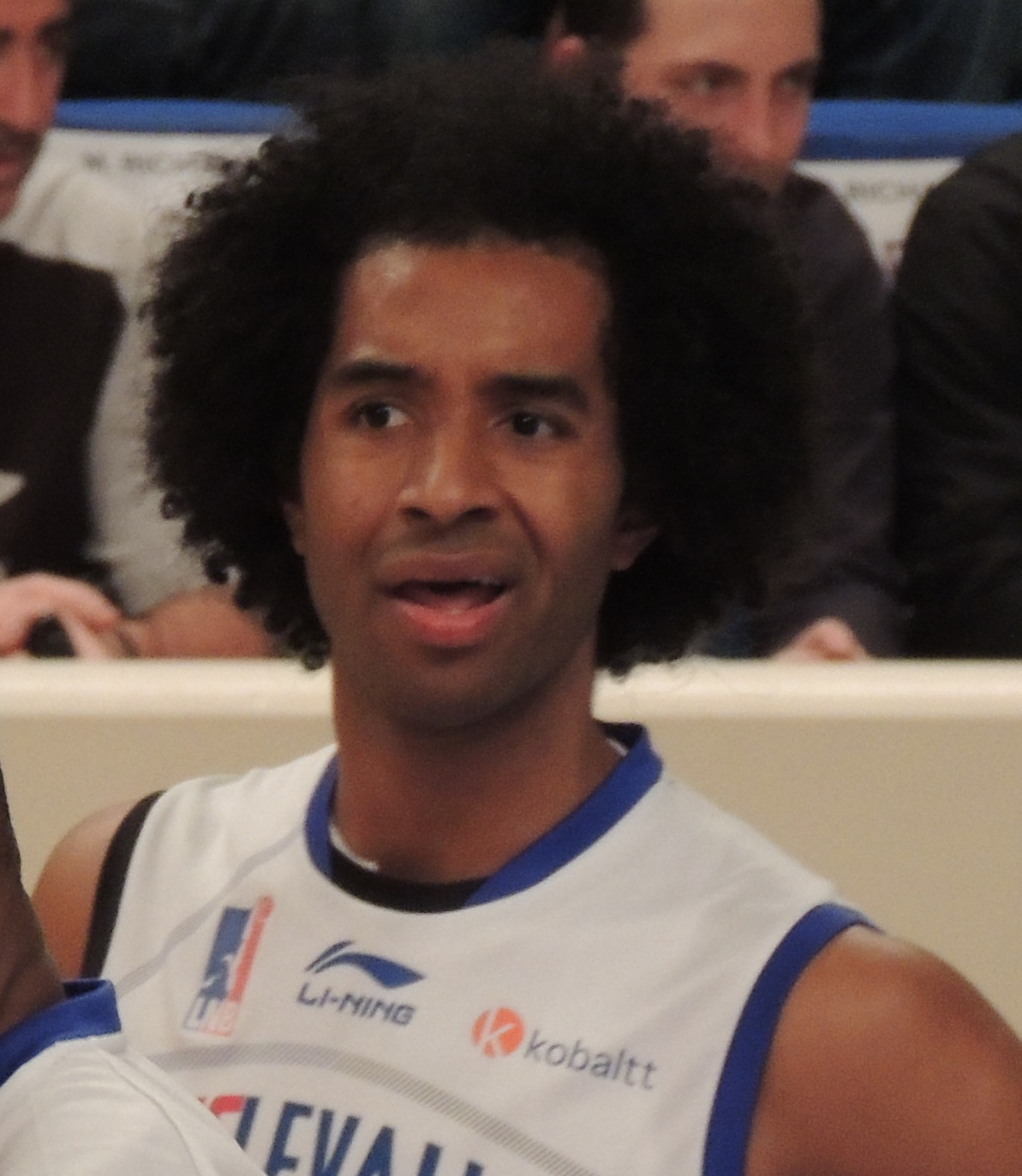
- Cox with Paris-Levallois in 2012

Personal information
- Born: July 6, 1981 (age 45) Caracas, Venezuela
- Listed height: 6 ft 5 in (1.96 m)
- Listed weight: 195 lb (88 kg)

Career information
- High school: Carver (Philadelphia, Pennsylvania)
- College: University of San Francisco (1999–2005)
- NBA draft: 2005: undrafted
- Playing career: 2005–2019
- Position: Point guard / Shooting guard

Career history
- 2005–2006: Élan Chalon
- 2006–2008: STB Le Havre
- 2008–2010: SLUC Nancy Basket
- 2010–2012: STB Le Havre
- 2012–2013: Paris-Levallois Basket
- 2013–2014: Cholet Basket
- 2014–2015: STB Le Havre
- 2015–2017: Bucaneros de La Guaira
- 2017: Élan Béarnais Pau-Orthez
- 2017–2018: Medi Bayreuth
- 2018–2019: SLUC Nancy Basket

Career highlights
- FIBA AmeriCup champion (2015); FIBA AmeriCup Top Scorer (2017)

John Arthur Cox IV (born July 6, 1981) is a Venezuelan-American former professional basketball player. A 6 ft 5 in (1.96 m) shooting guard and point guard, Cox played in several top-tier European leagues, including France’s LNB Pro A, Germany’s Basketball Bundesliga, and competed in the EuroLeague. Internationally, he represented Venezuela, winning gold at the 2015 FIBA Americas Championship and playing at the 2016 Summer Olympics.

== College career ==
Cox played college basketball for the University of San Francisco Dons from 1999 to 2005. He finished as one of the program's all-time leading scorers and helped the team reach the 2005 National Invitation Tournament (NIT).

== Professional career ==
Cox began his professional career in 2005 with Élan Chalon in France's LNB Pro A. Over the next decade, he played for multiple French clubs, including STB Le Havre, SLUC Nancy Basket, Paris-Levallois Basket, and Cholet Basket. He also had stints with Bucaneros de La Guaira in Venezuela, Élan Béarnais Pau-Orthez in France, and Medi Bayreuth in Germany.

In 2017, he signed with Pau-Orthez for the remainder of the season. He concluded his professional career with SLUC Nancy Basket during the 2018–2019 season.

== National team career ==
Cox represented Venezuela at several international tournaments. He played in the 2012 Olympic Qualifying Tournament, the 2015 Pan American Games, and the 2015 FIBA Americas Championship, where Venezuela won its first-ever continental title. He also competed at the 2016 Summer Olympics. In 2017, Cox was the leading scorer of the 2017 FIBA AmeriCup.

== Personal life ==
Cox was born in Caracas while his father, Chubby Cox, played professionally in Venezuela. Chubby Cox later played for the Washington Bullets in the NBA. John is also a first cousin of Kobe Bryant, the son of Chubby's sister Pam Bryant. John and Chubby are one of six father-son pairs to reach the finals of Venezuela's LPB. He is currently the Athletic Director at Germantown Academy and head coach of their varsity basketball program.
