= Ollie Johnson (basketball, born 1942) =

American basketball player

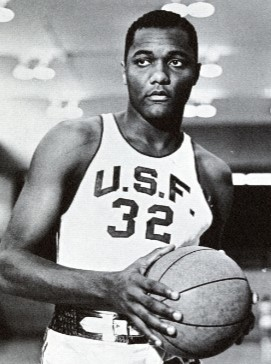
- Johnson as a senior at USF

Personal information
- Born: December 25, 1942 (age 83) Washington, D.C., U.S.
- Listed height: 6 ft 7 in (2.01 m)
- Listed weight: 220 lb (100 kg)

Career information
- High school: Spingarn (Washington, D.C.)
- College: San Francisco (1962–1965)
- NBA draft: 1965: 1st round, 8th overall pick
- Drafted by: Boston Celtics
- Position: Center / power forward

Career highlights
- Second-team All-American – NABC (1965); Third-team All-American – UPI (1965); 2× WCAC Player of the Year (1964, 1965); 3× First-team All-WCAC (1963–1965); No. 32 retired by San Francisco Dons; AAU All-American (1965)
- Stats at Basketball Reference
Medals
Men's basketball
Representing United States
Summer Universiade
Gold medal – first place	1965 Budapest	Team

Oliver Johnson (born December 25, 1942) is an American retired basketball player. He was an All-American forward at the University of San Francisco and a first-round draft pick in the National Basketball Association (NBA) in 1965.

== Basketball career ==
Johnson, A 6'7 power forward, was a 3-time All Interhigh and 2-time All MET playing for William Roundtree at Spingarn HS. Johnson teamed with Dave Bing to win the DC Interhigh Titles in ‘60 and ‘61 and a City Championship vs DeMatha in 1961, in front of a sold-out crowd (10,500) at the U of Maryland's Cole Field House. Johnson averaged 19.9 pts and 17.5 rebounds for his senior season.

Johnson played college basketball at the University of San Francisco from 1962 to 1965. At USF, Johnson was a first team All-West Coast Conference pick each of his three years there (freshmen were ineligible) and was named WCC player of the year as a junior and senior. Johnson led the Dons to WCC championships and NCAA tournament appearances in all three of his seasons. The Dons lost in the West regional final in consecutive years to eventual champion UCLA. In the 1965 NCAA tournament, Johnson led all players in scoring in rebounding average as he tallied 36 points and 18.5 rebounds per game.

For his career, Ollie Johnson scored 1,668 points (19.9 per game) and grabbed 1,323 rebounds (15.8 per game), ranking him in the school's top ten all-time in both categories. In addition to his conference accolades, Johnson was named an All-American in 1964 and 1965.

Johnson was drafted in the first round of the 1965 NBA draft by the Boston Celtics (8th pick overall), but he never played in the NBA. Before being cut by the Celtics, he played for the San Francisco Athletic Club in the Amateur Athletic Union, where he was named an AAU All-American in 1965. He then played overseas in the Basketball League Belgium for three seasons.
