= John Lo Schiavo =

25th President of the University of San Francisco
- In office 1977–1991
- Preceded by: William C. McInnes, S.J.
- Succeeded by: John P. Schlegel, S.J.

Personal details
- Born: February 25, 1925 San Francisco, California, U.S.
- Died: May 15, 2015 (aged 90) Los Gatos, California, U.S.
- Education: Gonzaga University (B.A.); Gonzaga University (M.A.)

John Lo Schiavo S.J. (February 25, 1925 – May 15, 2015) was an American Jesuit and academic who was the 25th president of the University of San Francisco from 1977 until 1991 and later a USF chancellor.

== Biography ==
A lifelong resident of San Francisco, Lo Schiavo earned bachelor's and master's degrees in philosophy from Gonzaga University, and a licentiate in sacred theology from Alma College. He came to USF in 1950 as a philosophy instructor. In 1958, he became vice principal of Brophy College Preparatory in Phoenix. He returned to USF in 1962 as dean of students, becoming vice president of student affairs in 1966.

In 1968, he became president of Bellarmine College Preparatory in San Jose, at the same time becoming a member of USF's board of trustees. He became USF board chairman from 1970 to 1973, and rector of the USF Jesuit community in 1975. In 1977 he was elected to the first of his three five-year terms as president.

During his tenure, he oversaw several major capital campaigns, including expansions to the law school and the building of a new campus recreation center. He was named chancellor in 1991, a post he held until his death in May 2015.

Lo Schiavo is most known for having made the decision to shut down the school's powerful men's basketball program in 1982. The program had two NCAA titles and three Final Fours to its credit, but for the second half of the 1970s had been under nearly constant NCAA scrutiny for cheating by making secret payments to attract some of the best players. In 1980, Lo Schiavo gave new coach Pete Barry an ultimatum—unless he ran a clean program, it would be shut down. In 1982, All-American Quintin Dailey was arrested for sexually assaulting a female resident assistant. During the investigation, Dailey admitted taking a no-show job from a USF donor. Lo Schiavo had seen enough, and on July 29 announced that the men's basketball program would be shut down. In his view, this step was necessary to repair the damage to USF's reputation. The team did not play again until 1985.

Lo Schiavo, or "Father Lo", as he is popularly known, was a much-beloved figure at USF. In 2010, USF broke ground on a new science building and named it the John Lo Schiavo Center for Science and innovation in his honor.
