= Winford Boynes =

American basketball player (born 1957)

Personal information
- Born: May 17, 1957 (age 69) Greenville, South Carolina, U.S.
- Listed height: 6 ft 6 in (1.98 m)
- Listed weight: 185 lb (84 kg)

Career information
- High school: Capitol Hill (Oklahoma City, Oklahoma)
- College: San Francisco (1975–1978)
- NBA draft: 1978: 1st round, 13th overall pick
- Drafted by: New Jersey Nets
- Playing career: 1978–1987
- Position: Shooting guard / small forward
- Number: 34, 6

Career history
- 1978–1980: New Jersey Nets
- 1980–1981: Dallas Mavericks
- 1983–1984: Fenerbahçe
- 1985–1986: Pantterit
- 1986–1987: Nice BC

Career highlights
- 2× Third-team All-American – NABC (1977, 1978); First-team Parade All-American (1975); Fourth-team Parade All-American (1974)

Career NBA statistics
- Points: 1,478 (8.4 ppg)
- Rebounds: 363 (2.1 rpg)
- Assists: 207 (1.2 apg)
- Stats at NBA.com
- Stats at Basketball Reference

Winford Gladstone Boynes III (born May 17, 1957) is an American former professional basketball player. Born in Greenville, South Carolina, he was a 6-foot-6-inch (198 cm) 185 pounds (84 kg) guard and played collegiately at the University of San Francisco from 1975–1978.

Boynes was the 13th selection in the 1978 NBA draft by the New Jersey Nets. The Nets had acquired the pick from the New York Knicks, along with Phil Jackson on June 8, 1978, in exchange for the Houston Rockets' 1978 first-round draft choice (Micheal Ray Richardson) and the Nets' 1979 first-round draft choice (Vinnie Johnson). In two seasons from 1978 to 1980, he played 133 games for the Nets, averaging 9.0 points, 2.2 rebounds and 1.3 assists per game. In 1980, Boynes was made available in the NBA expansion draft in which he was selected by the Dallas Mavericks. He was part of the starting lineup for the Mavs' first NBA game in 1980, in which he top-scored with 21 points in a 103–92 victory over the San Antonio Spurs.

He played for Fenerbahçe from Turkey in 1983–84 season in Turkish Basketball League.

== Career statistics ==
Legend
GP	Games played	GS	Games started	MPG	Minutes per game
FG%	Field goal percentage	3P%	3-point field goal percentage	FT%	Free throw percentage
RPG	Rebounds per game	APG	Assists per game	SPG	Steals per game
BPG	Blocks per game	PPG	Points per game	**Bold**	Career high

=== NBA ===
==== Regular season ====
Year	Team	GP	MPG	FG%	3P%	FT%	RPG	APG	SPG	BPG	PPG
1978–79	New Jersey	69	17.0	.430		.787	**2.2**	1.1	.6	.1	**9.3**
1979–80	New Jersey	64	**17.2**	**.473**	.000	.765	2.1	**1.5**	**.9**	.3	8.5
1980–81	Dallas	44	**17.2**	.387	–	**.818**	1.7	.8	.5	**.4**	6.5
Career		177	17.1	.435	.000	.783	2.1	1.2	.7	.2	8.4
