= James Hardy (basketball) =

American basketball player (1956–2020)

Personal information
- Born: December 1, 1956 Knoxville, Alabama, U.S.
- Died: December 29, 2020 (aged 64) Long Beach, California, U.S.
- Listed height: 6 ft 8 in (2.03 m)
- Listed weight: 220 lb (100 kg)

Career information
- High school: Jordan (Long Beach, California)
- College: San Francisco (1975–1978)
- NBA draft: 1978: 1st round, 11th overall pick
- Drafted by: New Orleans Jazz
- Playing career: 1978–1990
- Position: Power forward / center
- Number: 11

Career history
- 1978–1980: New Orleans / Utah Jazz
- 1980–1981: Anchorage Northern Knights
- 1981: Crispa Redmanizers
- 1981–1982: Utah Jazz
- 1982–1984: A.P.U. Udinese
- 1984–1985: Mister Day Siena
- 1985–1988: Paris Basket Racing
- 1988–1989: Olympique Antibes
- 1989–1990: CB Ourense

Career highlights
- First-team Parade All-American (1975)

Career NBA statistics
- Points: 1,410 (5.7 ppg)
- Rebounds: 1,312 (5.3 rpg)
- Assists: 315 (1.3 apg)
- Stats at NBA.com
- Stats at Basketball Reference

James Percivell Hardy (December 1, 1956 – December 29, 2020) was an American professional basketball player. Hardy played the forward position in the National Basketball Association (NBA) from 1978 to 1982. He played collegiately at the University of San Francisco. At 6 ft 9 in (206 cm) and 220 pounds (100 kg), he played as a power forward.

== NBA career ==
Hardy was selected with the 11th overall pick in the 1978 NBA draft by the New Orleans Jazz. In four seasons with the Jazz (who relocated to Salt Lake City, Utah in 1979), he averaged 5.7 points, 5.3 rebounds, and 1.3 assists per game.

== Death ==
Hardy died of a heart attack of December 29, 2020 in Long Beach, California.

== Career statistics ==
Legend
GP	Games played	GS	Games started	MPG	Minutes per game
FG%	Field goal percentage	3P%	3-point field goal percentage	FT%	Free throw percentage
RPG	Rebounds per game	APG	Assists per game	SPG	Steals per game
BPG	Blocks per game	PPG	Points per game	**Bold**	Career high

=== NBA ===
==== Regular season ====
Year	Team	GP	GS	MPG	FG%	3P%	FT%	RPG	APG	SPG	BPG	PPG
1978–79	New Orleans	68		21.4	.460		.693	4.6	1.0	.8	.9	**6.7**
1979–80	Utah	76		21.1	**.507**	**.500**	**.773**	5.3	1.4	.6	**1.1**	5.5
1980–81	Utah	23		**22.1**	.468	–	.550	**5.8**	**1.6**	**.9**	.9	5.0
1981–82	Utah	**82**	17	**22.1**	.485	.000	.688	5.7	1.3	.7	.8	5.1
Career		249	17	21.6	.481	.333	.700	5.3	1.3	.7	.9	5.7
