= Chubby Cox =

American basketball player

Personal information
- Born: December 29, 1955 (age 70) Philadelphia, Pennsylvania, U.S.
- Listed height: 6 ft 2 in (1.88 m)
- Listed weight: 181 lb (82 kg)

Career information
- High school: Roxborough (Philadelphia, Pennsylvania)
- College: Villanova (1973–1975); San Francisco (1976–1978)
- NBA draft: 1978: 8th round, 159th overall pick
- Drafted by: Chicago Bulls
- Playing career: 1978–1983
- Position: Shooting guard
- Number: 32

Career history
- 1978–1980: Wilkes-Barre Barons
- 1980–1981: Philadelphia Kings
- 1981: Beverly Hills
- 1983: Washington Bullets
- Stats at NBA.com
- Stats at Basketball Reference

John Arthur "Chubby" Cox III (born December 29, 1955) is an American former professional basketball player. Cox was drafted by the Chicago Bulls in the 1978 NBA draft and played for the Washington Bullets for one season. He played college basketball for the Villanova Wildcats and San Francisco Dons.

== Life and career ==
Cox was born in Philadelphia, Pennsylvania. Cox was a 6-foot-2-inch (188 cm) shooting guard, Cox attended Roxborough High School in Philadelphia. He played two years at Villanova University and then starred at the University of San Francisco (USF), where he still ranks among the Top 10 in single-season assists.

He was drafted in the eighth round (seventh pick) by the NBA's Chicago Bulls in 1978. However, Cox did not make an NBA roster until the 1982–83 season, when he played seven games for the Washington Bullets, scoring 29 total points.

Cox played professionally in the Continental Basketball Association (CBA) from 1978 to 1981. Over three seasons with the Philadelphia Kings, Pennsylvania Barons, and Wilkes-Barre Barons, Cox averaged nearly 22 points per game. He scored 50 points in a December 28, 1979 game against the Lancaster Red Roses. He also played professionally in Venezuela for Beverley Hills in Caracas.

Cox married his girlfriend, and former University of San Francisco cheerleader, Victoria and together they have an American-Venezuelan son, John, who plays professional basketball in Venezuela, where he was born.

Cox's brother-in-law was former NBA player Joe Bryant and his nephew was Naismith Memorial Basketball Hall of Famer Kobe Bryant.

== Career statistics ==
Legend
GP	Games played	GS	Games started	MPG	Minutes per game
FG%	Field goal percentage	3P%	3-point field goal percentage	FT%	Free throw percentage
RPG	Rebounds per game	APG	Assists per game	SPG	Steals per game
BPG	Blocks per game	PPG	Points per game	**Bold**	Career high

=== NBA ===
==== Regular season ====
Year	Team	GP	GS	MPG	FG%	3P%	FT%	RPG	APG	SPG	BPG	PPG
1982–83	Washington	7	0	11.1	.351	.000	.500	1.4	.9	.0	.1	4.1
