= Quintin Dailey =

American basketball player (1961–2010)

Personal information
- Born: January 22, 1961 Baltimore, Maryland, U.S.
- Died: November 8, 2010 (aged 49) Las Vegas, Nevada, U.S.
- Listed height: 6 ft 3 in (1.91 m)
- Listed weight: 180 lb (82 kg)

Career information
- High school: Cardinal Gibbons (Baltimore, Maryland)
- College: San Francisco (1979–1982)
- NBA draft: 1982: 1st round, 7th overall pick
- Drafted by: Chicago Bulls
- Playing career: 1982–1992
- Position: Shooting guard
- Number: 44, 20

Career history
- 1982–1986: Chicago Bulls
- 1986: Mississippi Jets
- 1986–1989: Los Angeles Clippers
- 1989–1990: Sioux Falls Skyforce
- 1990–1991: Seattle SuperSonics
- 1991–1992: Yakima Sun Kings

Career highlights
- NBA All-Rookie First Team (1983); Consensus first-team All-American (1982); 2× WCAC Player of the Year (1981, 1982); 2× First-team All-WCAC (1981, 1982); Second-team All-WCAC (1980); Second-team Parade All-American (1979); McDonald's All-American (1979)

Career NBA statistics
- Points: 7,470 (14.1 ppg)
- Rebounds: 1,307 (2.5 rpg)
- Assists: 1,188 (2.3 apg)
- Stats at NBA.com
- Stats at Basketball Reference

Quintin "Q" Dailey (January 22, 1961 – November 8, 2010) was an American professional basketball player. A 6'3" guard who played collegiately at the University of San Francisco, he later went on to a career in the National Basketball Association (NBA), playing for the Chicago Bulls, Los Angeles Clippers, and Seattle SuperSonics over the course of his 10-year tenure in the league.

== Early life and legal troubles ==
Dailey was born on January 22, 1961, in Baltimore and was a schoolboy star at Cardinal Gibbons School, graduating in 1979. He was heavily recruited out of high school; from among the 200 colleges that pursued him, Dailey chose to attend the University of San Francisco to play for the Dons basketball team. Dailey scored 1,841 points during his collegiate career, averaging 20.5 points per game. The 755 points he scored during his third and final year at USF, averaging 25.2 points per game, broke a team record that had been held by Bill Cartwright.

In February 1982, Dailey was arrested for sexually assaulting a female resident assistant two months earlier. He pleaded guilty in June to a lesser charge of attempted assault, and received three years' probation. During the investigation, Dailey admitted to accepting $5,000 for a no-show job at a business owned by a prominent USF Dons sports donor. A month later, university president Rev. John Lo Schiavo announced that he was shutting down the basketball program. USF had been on NCAA probation twice in recent years, and LoSchiavo called the revelation about Dailey's no-show job "the last straw." Four days after his guilty plea, the Chicago Bulls selected Dailey as the seventh overall pick in the 1982 NBA draft. The basketball program was resumed in 1985.

== Professional career ==
The controversy followed him to Chicago. Women's groups and the Chicago press protested against his presence on the team, and building owners refused to have him as a tenant. John Schulian of the Chicago Sun-Times criticized the preferential treatment he had received as a star basketball player, saying that "if he were just another creep off the street, he would still be learning what a chamber of horrors the halls of justice can be." At his first press conference after being drafted, he refused to express any remorse for his crime or sympathy for his victim, and claimed no one gave him a chance to tell his side of the story. The student he assaulted sued him in 1983, and Dailey settled by paying $100,000 and apologizing to her.

Despite the off-court distractions, Dailey averaged 15.1 points per game in his first season with the Bulls and was chosen for that year's NBA All-Rookie Team. The following year was his most productive, when he averaged 18.2 points.

During the 1984-85 season, a rookie Michael Jordan replaced Dailey as starting shooting guard for the Bulls. Dailey complained, calling himself "a player who likes to shine a little bit myself". On March 20, 1985, in a game where the Bulls visited San Antonio, Dailey had a ballboy bring him food while on the bench during the game, violation of informal NBA decorum. As the third quarter drew to a close, Dailey was consuming a slice of pizza, nachos, popcorn and a soft drink.

Over his ten years in the NBA he averaged 14.1 points per game but continued to be a distraction off the court, missing games and violating NBA drug policy on two occasions.

In the 1985 film To Live and Die in L.A., directed by Chicago native William Friedkin, Dailey's performance in a Bulls game is praised by the main character, Richard Chance (William Petersen), when he remarks, "Quintin Dailey got 30 points. The guy's unbelievable, man. Say all you want about Michael Jordan, he's a great f**kin' ballplayer, but Quintin Dailey's got a gun like a howitzer, man. Thirty feet—boom, boom, boom. He gets hot, he's fabulous."

== Post-playing career ==
In 1996, Dailey was hired by the Clark County, Nevada, Parks and Recreation Department. He eventually became a recreation and cultural program supervisor, a position he maintained until his death. He had a variety of responsibilities, including gang intervention, sports and special events. He also refereed basketball games from 2000 until 2010.

== Death ==
Dailey died in his sleep in Las Vegas at the age of 49 on November 8, 2010, due to hypertensive cardiovascular disease. He was survived by a daughter, Quinci, and a son, Quintin Jr., who played basketball at Eastern Michigan University.

== Career statistics ==
Legend
GP	Games played	GS	Games started	MPG	Minutes per game
FG%	Field goal percentage	3P%	3-point field goal percentage	FT%	Free throw percentage
RPG	Rebounds per game	APG	Assists per game	SPG	Steals per game
BPG	Blocks per game	PPG	Points per game	**Bold**	Career high
*	Led the league

=== NBA ===
==== Regular season ====
Year	Team	GP	GS	MPG	FG%	3P%	FT%	RPG	APG	SPG	BPG	PPG
1982–83	Chicago	76	32	27.4	.466	.200	.730	**3.4**	**3.7**	.9	.1	15.1
1983–84	Chicago	**82***	42	**29.9**	**.474**	.125	.811	2.9	3.1	**1.3**	.1	**18.2**
1984–85	Chicago	79	0	26.6	.473	**.233**	.817	2.6	2.4	.9	.1	16.0
1985–86	Chicago	35	0	20.7	.432	.000	**.823**	1.9	1.9	.6	.1	16.3
1986–87	L.A. Clippers	45	9	18.9	.407	.100	.768	1.7	1.6	.9	**.2**	10.6
1987–88	L.A. Clippers	67	7	19.1	.434	.167	.776	2.3	1.6	1.0	.1	13.4
1988–89	L.A. Clippers	65	**51**	25.0	.465	.111	.759	3.0	2.2	**1.3**	.1	16.1
1989–90	Seattle	30	2	16.4	.404	.200	.788	1.7	1.1	.4	.0	8.2
1990–91	Seattle	30	0	10.0	.471	.000	.613	1.1	.5	.2	.0	6.1
1991–92	Seattle	11	1	8.9	.243	.000	.813	1.1	.4	.5	.1	2.8
Career		528	140	23.0	.454	.158	.779	2.5	2.3	.9	.1	14.1

==== Playoffs ====
Year	Team	GP	GS	MPG	FG%	3P%	FT%	RPG	APG	SPG	BPG	PPG
1985	Chicago	4	0	32.3	.419	.143	.727	3.3	2.8	1.0	.0	15.3
