= Wallace Bryant =

American basketball player-coach

Personal information
- Born: July 14, 1959 (age 67) Torrejón de Ardoz, Madrid, Spain
- Listed height: 7 ft 0 in (2.13 m)
- Listed weight: 245 lb (111 kg)

Career information
- High school: Emerson (Gary, Indiana)
- College: San Francisco (1978–1982)
- NBA draft: 1982: 2nd round, 30th overall pick
- Drafted by: Chicago Bulls
- Playing career: 1982–1997
- Position: Center
- Number: 54, 53, 31

Career history

Playing
- 1982–1983: Ford Cantù
- 1983–1984: Chicago Bulls
- 1984–1985: Dallas Mavericks
- 1986: Los Angeles Clippers
- 1986: Magia de Huesca
- 1986–1987: FC Barcelona
- 1987–1988: Yoga Bologna
- 1988–1989: Cajabilbao
- 1989–1990: Valvi Girona
- 1990–1991: Filodoro Napoli
- 1991: Magia de Huesca
- 1991: Oklahoma City Cavalry
- 1991–1993: Atenas de Córdoba
- 1993–1994: Peñarol de Mar del Plata
- 1994–1995: Ferro Carril Oeste
- 1996–1997: Atenas de Córdoba

Coaching
- 2007: Jackson Wildcats
- 2010–present: California Sea Kings
- 2019-present: Bethel Christian School

Career highlights
- Second-team Parade All-American (1978)
- Stats at NBA.com
- Stats at Basketball Reference

Wallace Gordon Bryant Jr. (born July 14, 1959) is a retired American professional basketball player who played in the National Basketball Association (NBA) and other leagues. A 7 feet 0 inches (2.13 m), 245 pounds (111 kg) pound center, born in Torrejón de Ardoz (Madrid, Spain), Bryant attended Emerson High School in Gary, Indiana, before playing at the University of San Francisco.

== Early life ==
Bryant was born in Spain and moved frequently as a child because his father worked in the military. His family settled in Gary, Indiana, where Bryant attended high school. Bryant's father worked as a dispatcher for a Gary bus company while his mother was an executive producer and vice president for a New York-based film company. His father was Baptist and his mother was Jewish; Bryant respected the tenets of both religions although he practiced neither.

== Professional playing career ==
Bryant was drafted by the Chicago Bulls in 1982. After one season with the Bulls, he was traded to the Dallas Mavericks, on September 14, 1984, with whom he spent the prime of his career.

On November 26, 1986, after two seasons with Dallas, Bryant was waived, and was than picked up by the Los Angeles Clippers. After playing eight games for Los Angeles, he retired from the league in 1986. After playing three seasons, his entire career totals were 323 points, 374 rebounds, and 40 blocks.

He also played in Spain for FC Barcelona (1986–87), in Italy for Ford Cantù (1982–1983) winning the Euroleague title, Yoga Bologna (1987–1988, Serie A2), and Filodoro Napoli (1990–1991).

== Coaching career ==
In 2011, Bryant became the basketball coach for the California Sea Kings of the new American Basketball Association.

== Career statistics ==
Legend
GP	Games played	GS	Games started	MPG	Minutes per game
FG%	Field goal percentage	3P%	3-point field goal percentage	FT%	Free throw percentage
RPG	Rebounds per game	APG	Assists per game	SPG	Steals per game
BPG	Blocks per game	PPG	Points per game	**Bold**	Career high

=== NBA ===
==== Regular season ====
Year	Team	GP	GS	MPG	FG%	3P%	FT%	RPG	APG	SPG	BPG	PPG
1983–84	Chicago	29	0	10.9	.391	–	.424	2.8	.4	.3	**.4**	**4.1**
1984–85	Dallas	**56**	**35**	15.4	**.453**	–	**.682**	**4.3**	**1.5**	**.4**	**.4**	2.9
1985–86	Dallas	9	8	**17.1**	.367	–	.545	3.7	1.2	.3	.2	3.1
1985–86	L.A. Clippers	8	0	8.0	.222	–	.625	2.5	.5	.3	**.4**	1.6
Career		102	43	13.7	.407	–	.573	3.7	1.1	.3	.4	3.2

==== Playoffs ====
Year	Team	GP	GS	MPG	FG%	3P%	FT%	RPG	APG	SPG	BPG	PPG
1985	Dallas	2	1	18.0	.000	–	1.000	3.5	.5	.5	.5	1.0
