= Bill Cartwright =

American basketball player and coach

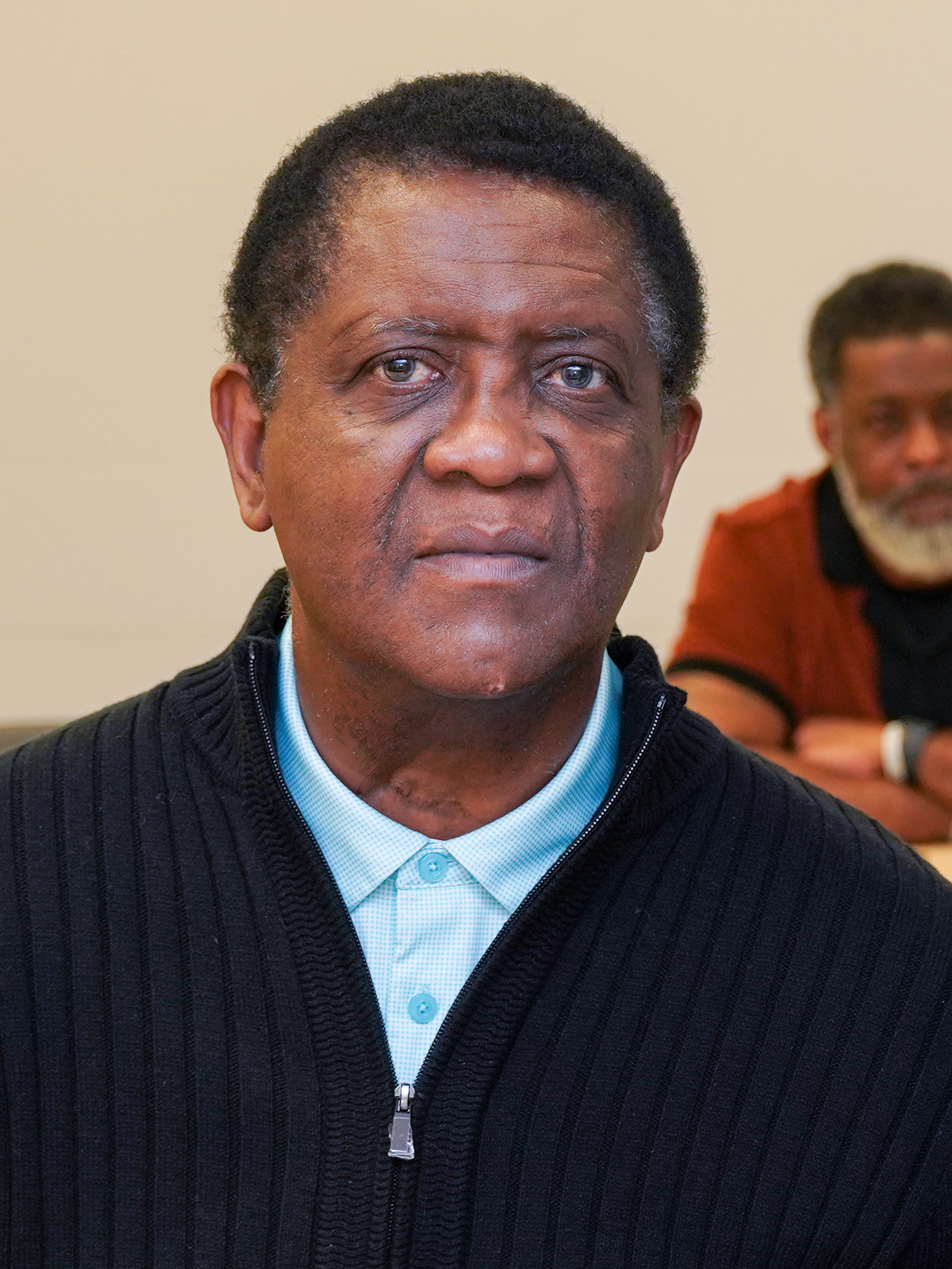
- Cartwright in 2025

Personal information
- Born: July 30, 1957 (age 69) Lodi, California, U.S.
- Listed height: 7 ft 1 in (2.16 m)
- Listed weight: 245 lb (111 kg)

Career information
- High school: Elk Grove (Elk Grove, California)
- College: San Francisco (1975–1979)
- NBA draft: 1979: 1st round, 3rd overall pick
- Drafted by: New York Knicks
- Playing career: 1979–1995
- Position: Center
- Number: 25, 24
- Coaching career: 1996–2013

Career history

Playing
- 1979–1988: New York Knicks
- 1988–1994: Chicago Bulls
- 1994–1995: Seattle SuperSonics

Career highlights
- As player: 3× NBA champion (1991–1993); NBA All-Star (1980); NBA All-Rookie First Team (1980); 2× Consensus second-team All-American (1977, 1979); 3× WCAC Player of the Year (1977–1979); 3× First-team All-WCAC (1977–1979); Second-team All-WCAC (1976); No. 24 retired by San Francisco Dons; Mr. Basketball USA (1975); First-team Parade All-American (1975); Third-team Parade All-American (1974); 2× California Mr. Basketball (1974, 1975); As assistant coach: 2× NBA champion (1997, 1998)

Career statistics
- Points: 12,713 (13.2 ppg)
- Rebounds: 6,106 (6.3 rpg)
- Assists: 1,390 (1.4 apg)
- Stats at NBA.com
- Stats at Basketball Reference

James William Cartwright (born July 30, 1957) is an American former professional basketball player and a former coach. A 7-foot-1-inch (2.16 m) center, he played 16 seasons in the National Basketball Association (NBA) for the New York Knicks, Chicago Bulls and Seattle SuperSonics, helping the Bulls capture consecutive championships in the 1991, 1992 and 1993 seasons. He attended Elk Grove High School in Elk Grove, California, and played college basketball for the San Francisco Dons. Following his playing career, he served as the head coach of the Chicago Bulls, the Osaka Evessa of the bj League and the Mexico men's national basketball team as well as an assistant coach for several years in the NBA.

== Early life ==
James William Cartwright was born to James and Marie Cartwright on July 30, 1957, in Lodi, California.

In high school, Cartwright played basketball for the Elk Grove Thundering Herd under coach Dan Risley. With Cartwright on the squad, the team went undefeated in the 1973–1974 season and was named the best high school basketball team in California in both 1974 and 1975. In 1975, Elk Grove won the NorCal Tournament of Champions. In 1974 and 1975, Cartwright was named California High School State Basketball Player of the Year. In 1975, he was named California High School Sports Athlete of the Year.

As a prep star, Cartwright was just as highly regarded as fellow preps Darryl Dawkins and Bill Willoughby.

Cartwright graduated from Elk Grove High School in 1975.

== College basketball career ==
Cartwright played college basketball at the University of San Francisco and was a consensus second-team all-American in 1977 and 1979. During the 1978/79 USF season, Cartwright played on one of the tallest starting lineups in collegiate history with the 7'1" Cartwright at center, the 7'0" Wallace Bryant at power forward, and the 6'10" Guy Williams at small forward. He graduated as the all-time leading scorer for the Dons, averaging 19.1 points and 10.2 rebounds per game. Cartwright led San Francisco to three trips to the NCAA tournament, to the first round in the 1977 and to the Sweet Sixteen in both 1978 and 1979.

Year	Team W-L	G	FG	FGA	FG%	FT	FTA	FT%	RBs	Avg	Pts	Avg
1976	22–8	30	151	282	53.0	72	98	73.5	207	6.9	374	12.5
1977	29–2	31	241	426	56.6	118	161	73.3	262	8.5	600	19.4
1978	23–6	21	168	252	66.7	96	131	73.3	213	10.2	432	20.6
1979	22–7	29	268	443	60.6	174	237	73.4	455	15.7	710	24.5
Total	96–23	111	828	1406	58.9	460	627	73.4	1137	10.2	2116	19.1

== Professional career ==
=== New York Knicks (1979–1988) ===
Cartwright was the third overall pick in the 1979 NBA draft selected by the New York Knicks, making his only career All-Star Game appearance in his first season. He averaged over 20 points per game in his first two seasons for the Knicks, but after playing at least 77 games in each of his first five seasons, a series of foot injuries caused him to miss the 1984–1985 season. Following that season, the Knicks drafted center Patrick Ewing with the number-one overall pick in the 1985 NBA draft. However, ongoing foot problems limited Cartwright to only two appearances during the 1985–1986 season. When Cartwright returned for the 1986–1987 season, he and Ewing often started and played together but during the 1987–1988 season Cartwright was relegated to the bench.

=== Chicago Bulls (1988–1994) ===
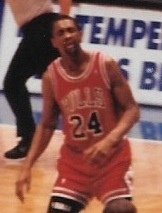
Cartwright playing for the Chicago Bulls in 1991

On June 15, 1988, Cartwright was traded along with two draft picks to the Chicago Bulls for forward Charles Oakley and two draft picks. The Bulls were willing to part with Oakley, the league's second-leading rebounder in the 1986–87 and 1987–88 seasons, because they needed a center and given the rapid development of power forward Horace Grant.

Cartwright was the Bulls' starting center during their string of three consecutive NBA championships in 1991, 1992 and 1993. During the 1992–93 season, Cartwright was elbowed in the throat during a regular-season game against the Indiana Pacers; his larynx fractured and he was left with a hoarse voice. He had multiple surgeries performed by Robert Sataloff to restore his ability to speak.

The Bulls, who were without Michael Jordan the following season following his retirement, made the 1994 NBA playoffs but were eliminated in a controversial game 7 in the Eastern Conference semifinals by the Knicks. Cartwright departed the team thereafter as an unrestricted free agent.

=== Seattle SuperSonics (1994–1995) ===
Cartwright left the Bulls as a free agent and signed with the Seattle SuperSonics. He only played in 29 games for the Sonics, and retired after the 1994–95 NBA season.

== Coaching career ==
A year after his retirement, Cartwright joined the Bulls again as an assistant coach under Phil Jackson ahead of the 1996–97 NBA season. He was a member of the championship-winning teams in 1997 and 1998. The Bulls underwent significant changes following the 1997–98 season, with not only Jordan and Pippen leaving, but Tim Floyd taking over as head coach. The Bulls had a lengthy rebuilding effort, and Cartwright took over as interim head coach of the Bulls 27 games into the 2001–02 season, going 17–38 after the team's 4–23 start under Floyd and interim head coach Bill Berry, who served in that position for two games before Cartwright. The Bulls finished 21–61 that year and the following season Cartwright was promoted from interim to permanent head coach. In the 2002–03 season the Bulls finished 30–52, but Cartwright only lasted 14 games into the 2003–04 season — going 4–10 — before being fired. Pete Myers and finally Scott Skiles coached the Bulls immediately following Cartwright's tenure.

In 2004, the New Jersey Nets hired Cartwright as an assistant coach under Lawrence Frank. In 2008, Cartwright was named an assistant coach for the Phoenix Suns under Terry Porter. Suns general manager Steve Kerr hired the former big man to help coach veteran big man Shaquille O'Neal, all-star Amar'e Stoudemire, and upcoming draft picks. After the Suns dismissed Porter and promoted assistant Alvin Gentry, Cartwright remained as assistant coach with the team.

In January 2013, Cartwright was hired to coach Osaka Evessa of the Japanese bj league. There, he was credited with turning the franchise around. When Cartwright arrived, Evessa had lost 19 of its 24 games. With Cartwright at the helm, the team won 17 of its final 28 games, including 10 straight at one point, posting a 22–30 record for the season. He did not return the following season, citing his desire to be closer to his family in Chicago.

In September 2014, Cartwright was hired as the head coach of the Mexico men's national basketball team ahead of the 2014 Central American and Caribbean Games, replacing recently fired Sergio Valdeolmillos. Five months later, he was replaced by Eddie Casiano who himself was fired after only two months without coaching a game and replaced by the aforementioned Valdeolmillos.

== Personal life ==
Cartwright married his junior high school sweetheart, Sheri, and together they have four children (Justin, Jason, James and Kristin). He also has two grandchildren. He earned a bachelor's degree in sociology from USF and later obtained a master's degree in organization development in 1998 from the same institution. In 2016, Cartwright became USF's director of university initiatives.

Cartwright is an avid fan of doo-wop music from the 1950s and 1960s and plays guitar and collects transistor radios as hobbies.

== NBA career statistics ==
Legend
GP	Games played	GS	Games started	MPG	Minutes per game
FG%	Field goal percentage	3P%	3-point field goal percentage	FT%	Free throw percentage
RPG	Rebounds per game	APG	Assists per game	SPG	Steals per game
BPG	Blocks per game	PPG	Points per game	**Bold**	Career high
†	Won an NBA championship

=== Regular season ===
Year	Team	GP	GS	MPG	FG%	3P%	FT%	RPG	APG	SPG	BPG	PPG
1979–80	New York	**82**		**38.4**	.547	–	.797	**8.9**	2.0	0.6	1.2	**21.7**
1980–81	New York	**82**		35.7	.554	.000	.788	7.5	1.4	0.6	1.0	20.1
1981–82	New York	72	50	28.6	.562	–	.763	5.8	1.2	**0.7**	0.9	14.4
1982–83	New York	**82**	**82**	30.1	**.566**	–	.744	7.2	1.7	0.5	**1.5**	15.7
1983–84	New York	77	77	32.3	.561	.000	.805	8.4	1.4	0.6	1.3	17.0
1985–86	New York	2	0	18.0	.429	–	.600	5.0	**2.5**	0.5	0.5	6.0
1986–87	New York	58	50	34.3	.531	–	.790	7.7	1.7	**0.7**	0.4	17.5
1987–88	New York	**82**	4	20.4	.544	–	.798	4.7	1.0	0.5	0.5	11.1
1988–89	Chicago	78	76	29.9	.475	–	.766	6.7	1.2	0.3	0.5	12.4
1989–90	Chicago	71	71	30.4	.488	–	**.811**	6.5	2.0	0.5	0.5	11.4
1990–91†	Chicago	79	79	28.8	.490	–	.697	6.2	1.6	0.4	0.2	9.6
1991–92†	Chicago	64	64	23.0	.467	–	.604	5.1	1.4	0.3	0.2	8.0
1992–93†	Chicago	63	63	19.9	.411	–	.735	3.7	1.3	0.3	0.2	5.6
1993–94	Chicago	42	41	18.6	.513	–	.684	3.6	1.4	0.2	0.2	5.6
1994–95	Seattle	29	19	14.8	.391	–	.625	3.0	0.3	0.2	0.1	2.4
Career		963	676	28.5	.525	.000	.771	6.3	1.4	0.5	0.7	13.2
All-Star		1	0	14.0	.500	–	–	3.0	1.0	0.0	0.0	8.0

=== Playoffs ===
Year	Team	GP	GS	MPG	FG%	3P%	FT%	RPG	APG	SPG	BPG	PPG
1981	New York	2		24.5	.353	–	.667	6.5	0.5	0.5	0.5	10.0
1983	New York	6		28.7	**.581**	–	.773	5.7	0.7	0.5	**1.2**	11.2
1984	New York	12		33.2	.556	–	**.863**	**8.3**	0.4	0.2	**1.2**	**17.4**
1988	New York	4	0	19.0	.500	–	.733	4.8	1.5	0.0	0.8	7.3
1989	Chicago	17	17	**34.3**	.486	–	.700	7.1	1.2	0.5	0.7	11.8
1990	Chicago	16	16	28.9	.413	–	.674	4.7	1.0	0.3	0.3	8.1
1991†	Chicago	17	17	30.1	.519	–	.688	4.7	**1.9**	0.5	0.4	9.5
1992†	Chicago	**22**	**22**	37.8	.474	–	.419	4.5	1.7	0.5	0.2	5.6
1993†	Chicago	19	19	23.4	.465	–	.778	4.5	1.5	**0.6**	0.2	6.3
1994	Chicago	9	8	21.0	.326	–	.813	4.9	1.2	0.3	0.2	4.6
Career		124	99	28.2	.482	–	.725	5.4	1.3	0.4	0.5	8.9

== Head coaching record ==
Legend
Regular season	G	Games coached	W	Games won	L	Games lost	W–L %	Win–loss %
Playoffs	PG	Playoff games	PW	Playoff wins	PL	Playoff losses	PW–L %	Playoff win–loss %

=== NBA ===
Team	Year	G	W	L	W–L%	Finish	PG	PW	PL	PW–L%	Result
Chicago	2001–02	55	17	38	.309	8th in Central	—	—	—	—	Missed playoffs
Chicago	2002–03	82	30	52	.366	6th in Central	—	—	—	—	Missed playoffs
Chicago	2003–04	14	4	10	.286	(fired)	—	—	—	—	—
Career		151	51	100	.338		—	—	—	—	

=== Japan ===
Team	Year	G	W	L	W–L%	Finish	PG	PW	PL	PW–L%	Result
Osaka Evessa	2013	28	17	11	.607	7th in Western	—	—	—	—	Missed playoffs

== See also ==
- List of NCAA Division I men's basketball players with 2000 points and 1000 rebounds
