= San Francisco Dons men's basketball =

University of San Francisco men's basketball team

2026–27 San Francisco Dons men's basketball team
- University: University of San Francisco
- Head coach: Chris Gerlufsen (5th season)
- Location: San Francisco, California
- Arena: War Memorial Gymnasium; Chase Center (capacity: 5,300 / 18,064)
- Conference: West Coast Conference
- Nickname: Dons
- Colors: Green and gold
- Student section: Los Locos

NCAA Division I tournament champions
- 1955, 1956
Other NCAA Division I tournament results
Final Four	1955, 1956, 1957
Elite Eight	1955, 1956, 1957, 1964, 1965, 1973, 1974
Sweet Sixteen	1955, 1956, 1957, 1958, 1963, 1964, 1965, 1972, 1973, 1974, 1978, 1979
Appearances	1955, 1956, 1957, 1958, 1963, 1964, 1965, 1972, 1973, 1974, 1977, 1978, 1979, 1981, 1982, 1998, 2022

NIT champions
- 1949

Conference tournament champions
- 1998

Conference regular-season champions
- 1955, 1956, 1957, 1958, 1963, 1964, 1965, 1972, 1973, 1974, 1977, 1978, 1979, 1980, 1981

Uniforms
Home	Away	Alternate

The San Francisco Dons men's basketball team represents the University of San Francisco in NCAA Division I men's college basketball. The Dons compete in the West Coast Conference, where they have won fifteen regular season championships and one conference tournament championship. The current head coach is Chris Gerlufsen. They play home games at the War Memorial Gymnasium, which also serves as the venue for women's basketball, volleyball, athletic department offices, and athletic training rooms. Some games may be played at Chase Center.

The basketball team claims three national titles: the 1949 NIT under Pete Newell, and the 1955 and 1956 NCAA Division I championships. The latter two were under Phil Woolpert, and led by player and National Collegiate Basketball Hall of Famer Bill Russell.

USF retained its status as a basketball powerhouse into the 1970s and early 1980s, holding the distinction of being a "major" program in a "mid-major" conference (the WCC having declined somewhat in stature since the 1960s). It held the number one spot in the polls on numerous occasions. In 1977, led by All-American center Bill Cartwright, the Dons started 29–0 and were regarded as the #1 team in the nation in both major polls before dropping their last two games.

The San Francisco Dons men's basketball program has been rated the 29th "Greatest College Basketball Program of All-Time" by Street & Smith's magazine, 49th by NBC Sports "Greatest Programs of All-Time", and 75th by the ESPN/Sagarin All-Time College Basketball Rankings, higher in all three rankings than any other West Coast Conference school and many schools from BCS Conferences (Pac-12, Big Ten, Big 12, Big East, Southeastern Conference).

== History ==
Basketball got its start at USF, then known as St. Ignatius College, in 1910. The original coach was Orno Taylor, whose subsequent achievements were lost to history. The College Annual reported that "the entire team did nobly in the season just finished and the student body as a unit thanks them for their loyalty and devotion." The St. Ignatius team won six of its seven games, losing only to Pacific (then located in San Jose) by three points. Included in the victories was a sweep of Santa Clara, still a major rival, by scores of 38–31 and 22–13.

=== Pete Newell era ===
After serving in the United States Navy from 1942 to 1946, Pete Newell was appointed men's basketball head coach at the University of San Francisco in 1946. During his four-year tenure at USF, Newell compiled a 70–37 record and coached the Dons to the 1949 National Invitation Tournament (NIT) championship, beating Loyola (Chicago) 48-47. (At the time, the NIT was more prestigious than the NCAA Tournament.) This was the team of All-American Don Lofgran, Joe McNamee, captain John Benington, Ross Giudice, Frank Kuzara and a baby-faced guard named Rene Herrerias. New York's Madison Square Garden crowds were notoriously tough to please. Lofgran, Herrerias and company had them cheering in the aisles. In 1950, he accepted an appointment as head coach at Michigan State University, where he stayed until 1954. He later led the University of California to the 1959 NCAA men's basketball championship, and a year later coached the gold medal-winning U.S. team at the 1960 Summer Olympics. After his coaching career ended he ran an instructional basketball camp and served as a consultant and scout for several National Basketball Association (NBA) teams.

=== Phil Woolpert and the Russell era ===
Newell left for Michigan State in 1950, and USF hired Phil Woolpert as his successor. He assumed both the posts of men's basketball coach and athletic director.

During his tenure at USF, Woolpert posted a 153–78 record, including a 60-game win streak that at the time was the longest in college basketball (surpassed later by John Wooden's 88 straight wins at UCLA.). His teams, anchored by Bill Russell, K.C. Jones, Eugene Brown and Mike Farmer, were known for their defense and held opponents below 60 points on 47 different occasions. USF won the National Championship in 1955 and 1956, and finished third in 1957. Woolpert also won Coach of the Year honors in 1955 and 1956.

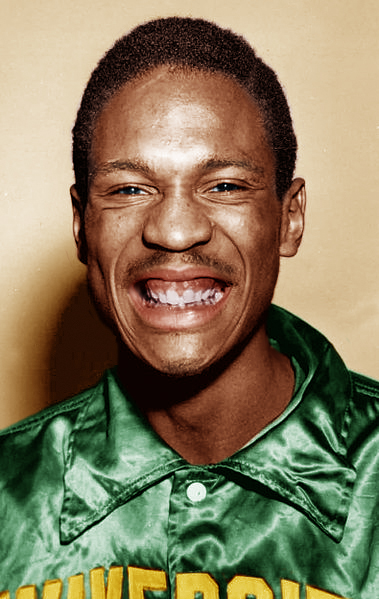
Bill Russell playing for USF.

Bill Russell was ignored by major college scouts, largely because he didn't even start at McClymonds High School in Oakland. He did not receive a single letter of interest until Hal DeJulio from USF watched him in a high school game. DeJulio was not impressed by Russell's meager scoring and "atrocious fundamentals", but sensed that the young center had an extraordinary instinct for the game, especially in clutch situations. When DeJulio offered Russell a scholarship, the latter eagerly accepted. Sports journalist John Taylor described it as a watershed in Russell's life because Russell realized that basketball was his one chance to escape poverty and racism.

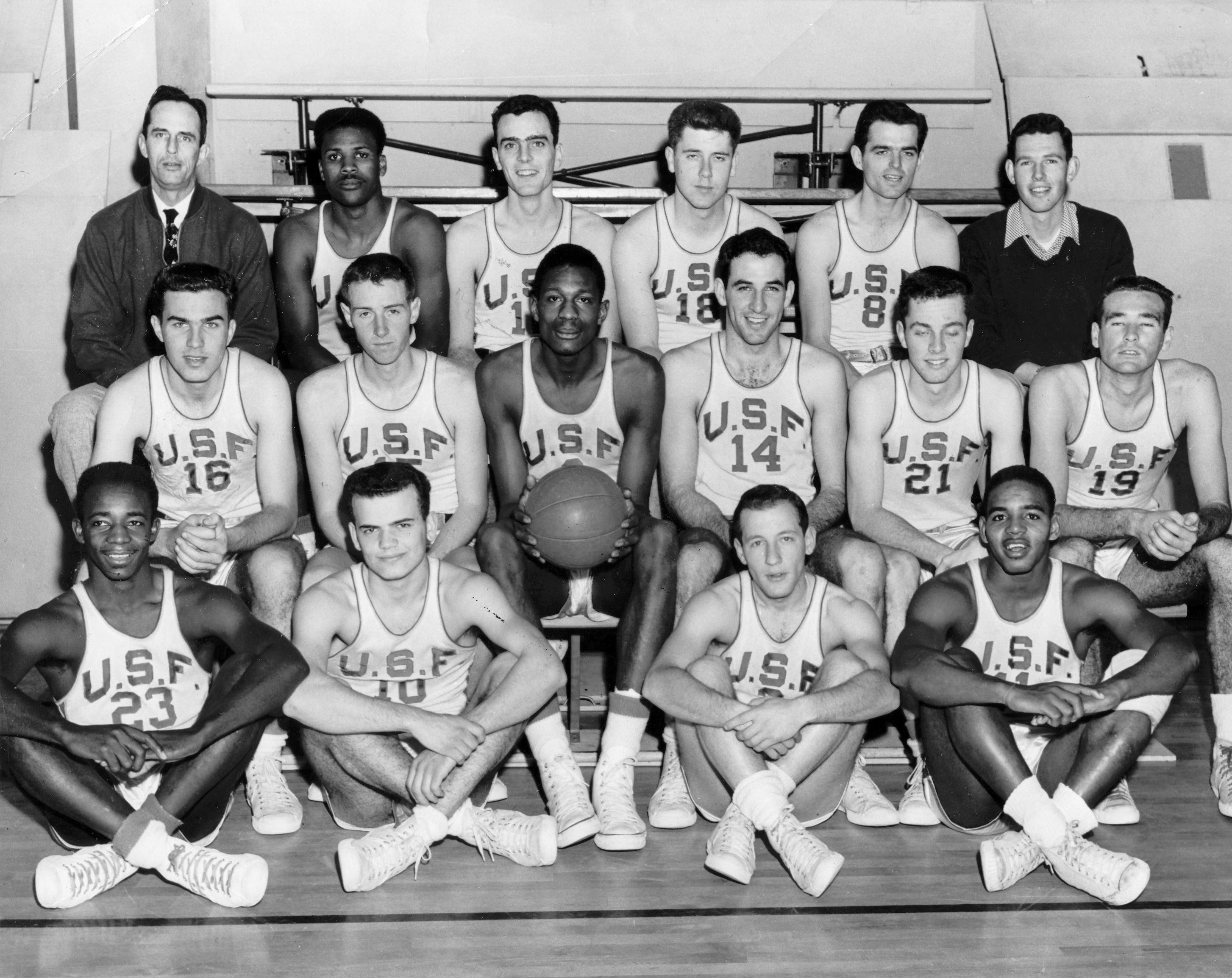
The 1954–55 team that won the NCAA championship. Bill Russell (center) is holding the ball.

At USF, Russell became the new starting center. Woolpert emphasized defense and deliberate half-court play, concepts that favored defensive standout Russell. Woolpert was unaffected by issues of skin color. In 1954, he became the first coach of a major college basketball squad to start three African American players: Russell, K.C. Jones and Hal Perry. In his USF years, Russell used his relative lack of bulk to develop a unique style of defense: instead of purely guarding the opposing center, he used his quickness and speed to play help defense against opposing forwards and aggressively challenge their shots. Combining the stature and shot-blocking skills of a center with the foot speed of a guard, Russell became the centerpiece of a USF team that soon became a force in college basketball. After USF kept Holy Cross star Tom Heinsohn scoreless in an entire half, Sports Illustrated wrote, "If [Russell] ever learns to hit the basket, they're going to have to rewrite the rules."

Nonetheless, these games were often difficult for the USF squad. Russell and his African American teammates became targets of racist jeers, particularly on the road. In one notable incident, hotels in Oklahoma City refused to admit Russell and his black teammates while they were in town for the 1954 All-College Tournament. In protest, the whole team decided to camp out in a closed college dorm, which was later called an important bonding experience for the group. Decades later, Russell explained that his experiences hardened him against abuse of all kinds. "I never permitted myself to be a victim," he said.

On the hardwood, his experiences were far more pleasant. Russell led USF to NCAA championships in 1955 and 1956, including a string of 55 consecutive victories. He became known for his strong defense and shot-blocking skills, once denying 13 shots in a game. UCLA coach John Wooden called Russell "the greatest defensive man I've ever seen". While at USF, together with K. C. Jones, he also helped pioneer a play that later became known as the alley-oop. During his college career, Russell averaged 20.7 points per game and 20.3 rebounds per game.

Besides basketball, Russell represented USF in track and field events. He competed in the 440 yards (400 m) race, which he could complete in 49.6 seconds. He also participated in the high jump; Track & Field News ranked him as the seventh-best high jumper in the world in 1956. That year, Russell won high jump titles at the Central California AAU meet, the Pacific AAU meet, and the West Coast Relays. One of his highest jumps occurred at the West Coast Relays, where he achieved a mark of 6 feet 9 1/4 inches (2.064 m).

After his years at USF, the Harlem Globetrotters invited Russell to join their exhibition basketball squad. Russell, who was sensitive to any racial prejudice, was enraged by the fact that owner Abe Saperstein would only discuss the matter with Woolpert. While Saperstein spoke to Woolpert in a meeting, Globetrotters assistant coach Harry Hanna tried to entertain Russell with jokes. The USF center was livid after this snub and declined the offer: he reasoned that if Saperstein was too smart to speak with him, then he was too smart to play for Saperstein. Instead, Russell made himself eligible for the 1956 NBA draft.

Woolpert stayed at USF for nine years. During his tenure, he was known for building national powers almost exclusively on Bay Area talent; the athletic department had virtually no recruiting budget and had little to offer out-of-state players.

=== 1960s and 1970s dominance ===
The Dons remained as a powerhouse for several years after their 1950s run. The team added four more Elite Eight appearances to its resume: 1964, 1965, 1973, and 1974.

USF retained its status as a basketball powerhouse into the 1970s and early 1980s under Bob Gaillard and Dan Belluomini, holding the distinction of being a "major" program in a "mid-major" conference (the WCC's stature declined somewhat in the 1960s). Although John Wooden and his UCLA Bruins had eclipsed San Francisco as the premier West Coast power, the Dons remained an elite program well into the early 1980s. It held the number one spot in the polls on numerous occasions and six consecutive conference titles from 1977 to 1982, and all but two WCC regular-season titles from 1972 to 1982. In 1977, led by All-American center Bill Cartwright, the Dons started the season 26–0 and were regarded as the #1 team in the nation in both major polls. Sports Illustrated highlighted the 1977 team with a cover story titled "The Dandy Dons." Until they lost to Notre Dame.

=== NCAA violations and self-imposed death penalty ===
"All the legitimate purposes of an athletic program in an educational institution are being distorted by the athletic program as it developed.”

— John Lo Schiavo

The Dons remained an elite program well into the early 1980s, perennially ranked in the top 20, and captured six consecutive conference titles from 1977–82. San Francisco's success on the court came at a price, however. The NCAA placed the Dons on probation two times in the late 1970s for booster/alumni interference with the program and recruiting improprieties by coaches. Each NCAA investigation eventually led to the dismissal of a San Francisco head coach, leading San Francisco Chronicle sportswriter Glenn Dickey to call the program "totally out of control." As a response to these incidents, school president Rev. John Lo Schiavo, S.J. a lifelong basketball enthusiast and all-city power forward in his youth, gave an ultimatum after the second NCAA case was resolved in 1980: if there was any further incident, the program would be shut down.

Despite Lo Schiavo's warning, the improprieties continued. An exclusive invite-only booster organization called the Dons Century Club committed hundreds of thousands of dollars to illegally recruiting players, paying off family members, and covering travel expenses, while other alumni were also giving or "lending" players large sums of money, paying them for no-show jobs, providing lavish gifts, as well as picking up pricey restaurant and entertainment tabs. Basketball players continued to receive special academic treatment; many were marginal students at best, and at least one incident occurred in which a player threatened another student, and the incident was swept under the rug by school officials. It was also commonplace for "tutors" to take tests and write papers for players. The situation finally came to a head in December 1981, when All-American guard Quintin Dailey was found guilty of raping a female student. During the subsequent investigation, Dailey admitted taking a no-show job for $1,000 a month at a business owned by a prominent USF booster, and that another booster also paid Dailey $5,000 since 1980.

True to his word, on July 29, 1982, Lo Schiavo announced that he was shutting down the basketball program—the first time a Division I university had voluntarily shut down a major sport under such circumstances. Lo Schiavo said that the Dons program "was once a source of inspiration, respect and pride for this university and city." By contrast, the recent scandals had resulted in USF being perceived as "being hypocritical or naïve or inept or duplicitous, or perhaps some combination of all those." Under the circumstances, Lo Schiavo felt that the only responsible course was to shutter the program. In a prepared statement, Lo Schiavo later said, "We hope that it one day may be possible to restore a men's intercollegiate basketball team. That possibility will depend upon whether those responsible for this university are convinced that the factors that destroyed the program are not going to beset it again."

His decision made international headlines, to the degree that while visiting San Francisco, Queen Elizabeth II pulled Lo Schiavo aside to ask when he would reinstate the basketball program. Drastic as it was, the move was widely applauded by several members of the coaching fraternity.

San Francisco reinstated men's basketball in 1985, but without the overzealous Dons Century Club. The successor to the Dons Century Club is the Green and Gold Club, a group of boosters under the direct control of the athletic department.

=== Reinstatement of Dons basketball ===
Lo Schiavo resurrected the program in 1985 with former star Jim Brovelli as head coach, who quickly returned the program to respectability. He was not able to reach the postseason, however, and resigned in 1995. Three years later USF went to the 1998 NCAA tournament under Phil Mathews and they had a 2005 NIT berth under former coach Jessie Evans.

The program regressed the next few years, and Jessie Evans was granted a request for a 'leave of absence' on December 27, 2007. Basketball coach Eddie Sutton took over on an interim basis, needing two wins for a personal milestone of 800 career coaching victories. At the time, Bob Knight was the only other Division I men's coach to have accomplished the feat. After months of speculation, Evans was finally officially fired by USF on March 20, 2008.

Rex Walters was named as the Dons' head coach on April 14, 2008. In 2010, the USF Dons won over 20 games and went to the quarterfinals of the postseason CIT tournament. Walters was relieved of his duties on March 9, 2016, and replaced by Kyle Smith.

At the conclusion of the 2018–2019 season, Kyle Smith was hired by Washington State University after three consecutive 20-win seasons.

Smith's Associate Head Coach Todd Golden was promoted to Head Men's Basketball Coach on March 27, 2019. Under Golden, the 2021-22 Dons returned to the NCAA tournament for the first time in 24 years. Golden departed after the season to coach Florida, where he led the Gators to the 2025 national championship, and was replaced by Chris Gerlufsen.

The Dons have never approached the prominence they enjoyed from the 1940s to the 1980s. The program has never won an NCAA Tournament game since its revival; indeed, the Dons last survived the tournament's opening weekend in 1979. This was largely because Lo Schiavo significantly increased admissions standards for all student-athletes in the wake of the scandals of the 1970s and 1980s, pricing the Dons out of blue-chip recruifs. In a 2011 interview, Lo Schiavo reiterated that he never questioned his decision, noting that all but one trustee voted in favor of shuttering the program in 1982 "because we had to make the point that we mean what we say and we intended to be good citizens."

== Postseason results ==
=== NCAA tournament results ===
The Dons have appeared in 17 NCAA Tournaments. Their combined record is 21–15. They are two time National Champions (1955, 1956).

Year	Seed	Round	Opponent	Result
1955		First Round; Sweet Sixteen; Elite Eight; Final Four; National Championship	West Texas State; Utah; Oregon State; Colorado; La Salle	W 89–66; W 78–59; W 57–56; W 62–50; W 77–63
1956		Sweet Sixteen; Elite Eight; Final Four; National Championship	UCLA; Utah; SMU; Iowa	W 72–61; W 92–77; W 86–68; W 83–71
1957		Sweet Sixteen; Elite Eight; Final Four; 3rd Place Game	Idaho State; California; Kansas; Michigan State	W 66–51; W 50–46; L 56–80; W 67–60
1958		Sweet Sixteen; Regional 3rd Place Game	Seattle; Idaho State	L 67–69; W 57–51
1963		Sweet Sixteen; Regional 3rd Place Game	Oregon State; UCLA	L 61–65; W 76–75
1964		Sweet Sixteen; Elite Eight	Utah State; UCLA	W 64–58; L 72–76
1965		Sweet Sixteen; Elite Eight	Oklahoma City; UCLA	W 91–67; L 93–101
1972		Sweet Sixteen; Regional 3rd Place Game	Long Beach State; Weber State	L 55–75; W 74–64
1973		Sweet Sixteen; Elite Eight	Long Beach State; UCLA	W 77–67; L 39–54
1974		Sweet Sixteen; Elite Eight	New Mexico; UCLA	W 64–61; L 60–83
1977		First Round	UNLV	L 95–121
1978		First Round; Sweet Sixteen	North Carolina; Cal State Fullerton	W 68–64; L 72–75
1979	4	Second Round; Sweet Sixteen	(5) BYU (1) UCLA	W 86–63; L 81–99
1981	9	First Round	(8) Kansas State	L 60–64
1982	9	First Round	(8) Boston College	L 66–70
1998	14	First Round	(3) Utah	L 68–85
2022	10	First Round	(7) Murray State	L 87–92

=== NIT results ===
The Dons have appeared in eight National Invitation Tournaments (NIT). Their combined record is 7–6. They were NIT champions in 1949.

Year	Round	Opponent	Result
1949	First Round; Quarterfinals; Seminfinals; Championship	Manhattan; Utah; Bowling Green; Loyola Chicago	W 68–43; W 64–53; W 49–39; W 48–47
1950	First Round	CCNY	L 46–65
1966	First Round; Quarterfinals	Penn State; Army	W 89–77; L 63–80
1976	First Round	Charlotte	L 74–79
2005	Opening Round; First Round	Denver; Cal State Fullerton	W 69–67; L 69–85
2014	First Round	LSU	L 63–71
2024	First Round	Cincinnati	L 72–73 ^{OT}
2025	First Round; Second Round	Utah Valley; Loyola Chicago	W 79–70; L 76-77

=== CBI results ===
The Dons have appeared in the College Basketball Invitational (CBI) three times. Their combined record is 4–3.

Year	Round	Opponent	Result
2012	First Round	Washington State	L 75–89
2017	First Round	Rice	L 76–85
2018	First Round; Quarterfinals; Semifinals; Finals–Game 1 Finals–Game 2 Finals–Game 3	Colgate; Utah Valley; Campbell; North Texas; North Texas; North Texas	W 72–68; W 78–73; W 65–62; W 72–62; L 55–69; L 77–88

=== CIT results ===
The Dons have appeared in one CollegeInsider.com Postseason Tournament (CIT). Their record is 2–1.

Year	Round	Opponent	Result
2011	First Round; Second Round; Quarterfinals	Portland; Hawaiʻi; Santa Clara	W 81–64; W 77–74; L 91–95

== Retired numbers ==
The Dons have retired seven numbers to date:

San Francisco Dons Lions retired numbers
No.	Player	Position	Career
4	K.C. Jones	PG	1952–1956
6	Bill Russell	C	1953–1956
17	Mike Farmer	SF	1955–1958
20	Phil Smith	SG	1971–1974
24	Bill Cartwright	C	1975–1979
31	Joe Ellis	SF	1963–1966
32	Ollie Johnson	C	1962–1965

== All-Americans ==
All-Americans
Year	Player
1928	Forest Ray Maloney
1930	Rene Barielles
1948	Don Lofgran
1948	Don Lofgran
1955	Bill Russell
1956	Bill Russell
1956	K.C. Jones
1958	Mike Farmer
1964	Ollie Johnson
1965	Ollie Johnson
1974	Phil Smith
1977	Bill Cartwright
1977	James Hardy
1977	Winford Boynes
1978	Bill Cartwright
1978	Winford Boynes
1979	Bill Cartwright
1982	Quintin Dailey

== Dons in the NBA ==
The University of San Francisco has had 24 players go on to play in the NBA:

- Jamaree Bouyea 2022
- Winford Boynes 1978–1980
- Wallace Bryant 1983–1985
- Bill Cartwright 1979–1994
- Chubby Cox 1982
- Pete Cross 1970–1972
- Quintin Dailey 1982–1991
- Joe Ellis 1966–1973
- Mike Farmer 1958–1965
- Eric Fernsten 1975–1983
- James Hardy 1978–1981
- K. C. Jones 1958–1966
- Fred LaCour 1960–1962
- Dave Lee 1967–1968
- Don Lofgran 1950–1953
- Joe McNamee 1950–1951
- Jonathan Mogbo 2024
- Erwin Mueller 1966–1973
- Paul Napolitano 1948
- Marlon Redmond 1978–1979
- Billy Reid 1980
- Kevin Restani 1974–1981
- Bill Russell 1956–1969
- Fred Scolari 1946–1954
- Phil Smith 1974–1982
- Ime Udoka (finished NCAA career at Portland State) 2003–2011
- Guy Williams (finished NCAA career at Washington State) 1984–1985

== Other notable players ==
- Angelo Caloiaro (born 1989), basketball player in the Israeli Basketball Premier League
- Ollie Johnson, selected by the Boston Celtics, played professionally in Belgium
- Ken McAlister, played in the NFL without any college football experience
- Shamell Stallworth, basketball player in NBB
- Mark Tollefsen, 2018–19 top scorer in the Israel Basketball Premier League
- Kwame Vaughn (born 1990), basketball player for Maccabi Haifa in the Israeli Basketball National League
- Sinqua Walls, actor, starred in the 2023 remake of White Men Can't Jump
- Marcus Williams (born 2002), basketball player in the Israeli Basketball Premier League
