= List of Santa Clara University people =

This is a list of notable persons, including students, alumni, faculty, and academic affiliates, associated with Santa Clara University in Santa Clara, California, United States.

== University presidents ==
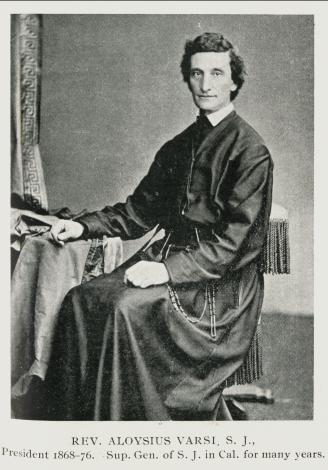
Aloysius Varsi, president 1868–76

John Pinasco, president 1880–83 & 88–93

- John Nobili, 1851–56
- Nicholas Congiato, 1856–57
- Felix Cicaterri, 1857–61
- Burchard Villiger, 1861–65
- Aloysius Masnata, 1865–68
- Aloysius Varsi, 1868–76
- Aloysius Brunengo, 1876–80
- John Pinasco, 1880–83
- Robert E. Kenna, 1883–88
- John Pinasco, 1888–93
- Joseph W. Riordan, 1893–99
- Robert E. Kenna, 1899–1905
- Richard A. Gleeson, 1905–10
- James P. Morrissey, 1910–13
- Walter F. Thornton, 1913–18
- Timothy L. Murphy, 1918–21
- Zacheus J. Maher, 1921–26
- Cornelius J. McCoy, 1926–32
- James J. Lyons, 1932–35
- Louis C. Rudolph, 1935–40
- Charles J. Walsh, 1940–45
- William C. Gianera, 1945–51
- Herman J. Hauck, 1951–58
- Patrick A. Donahoe, 1958–68
- Thomas D. Terry, 1968–76
- William J. Rewak. 1976–88
- Paul L. Locatelli, 1988–2008
- Michael Engh, January 5, 2009 – 2019
- Kevin O'Brien, 2019–2021
- Lisa A. Kloppenberg, 2021–2022
- Julie Sullivan, 2022–present

== Board of trustees ==
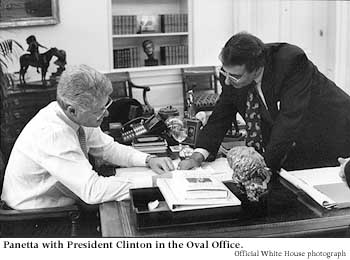
Leon Panetta, former chief of staff for President Bill Clinton

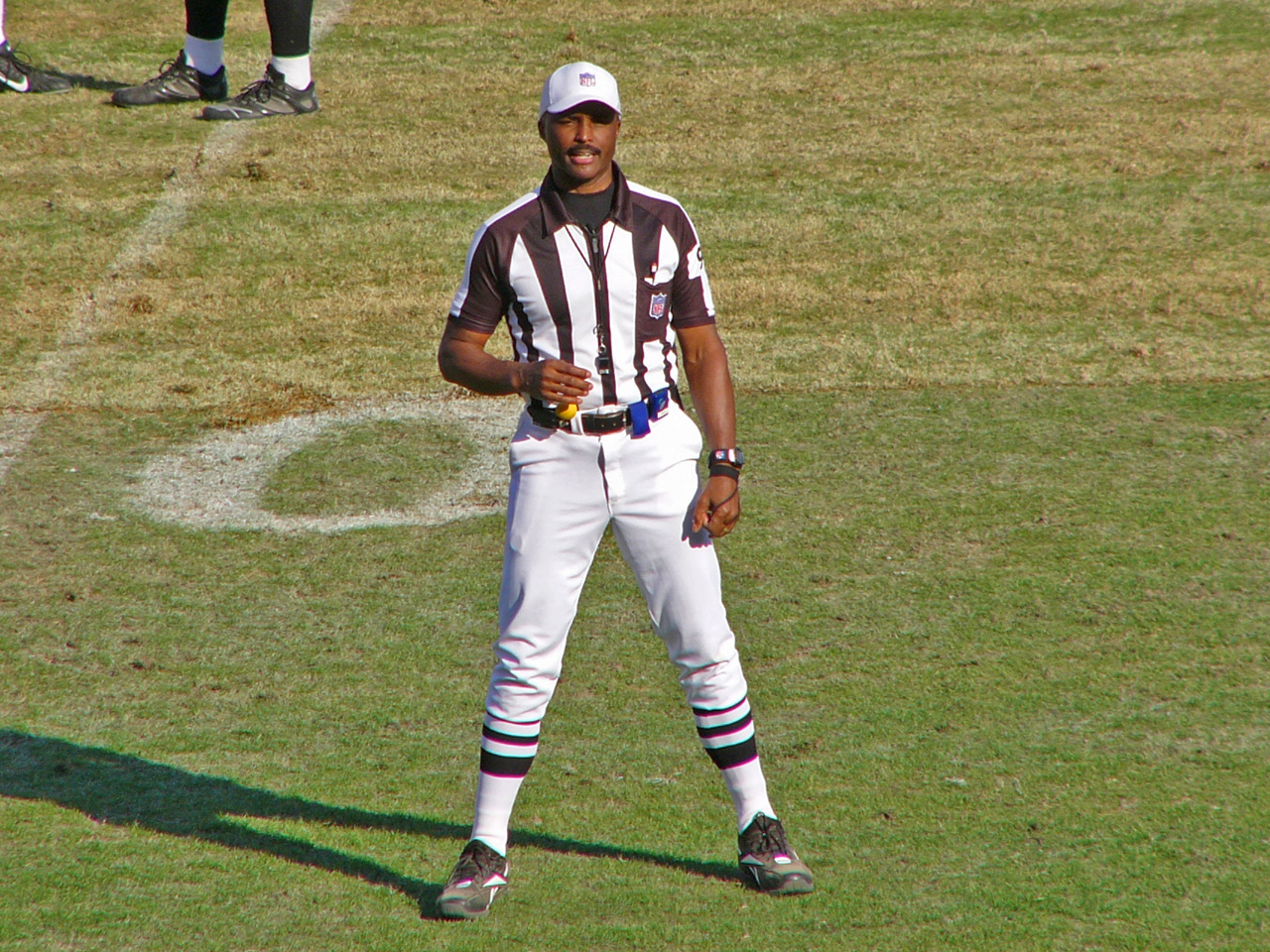
Mike Carey, NFL referee

- Mike Carey, president of Seirus Gloves and Accessories, head referee for the NFL
- David C. Drummond, VP of Corporate Development and chief counsel, Google
- Rupert H. Johnson, Jr., vice chairman of Franklin Resources, Inc.
- Jack D. Kuehler, retired president of IBM Corporation
- J. Terrence "Terry" Lanni, CEO and chairman of the board at MGM Mirage, Las Vegas
- Paul L. Locatelli, S.J., former university president
- Lorry I. Lokey, president/owner of Business Wire
- A.C. (Mike) Markkula, owner of A.C.M. Investments and co-founder of Apple Computer
- Regis McKenna, chairman of the McKenna Group
- Edward A. Panelli (1955), chairman emeritus of Judicial, Arbitration and Mediation Services
- Leon Panetta, director of Panetta Institute for Public Policy at the California State University, Monterey Bay
- John A. Sobrato, chairman of Sobrato Development Companies
- Larry W. Sonsini, chairman and CEO of Wilson Sonsini Goodrich & Rosati

== Notable alumni ==
=== Academics ===
==== Academia ====
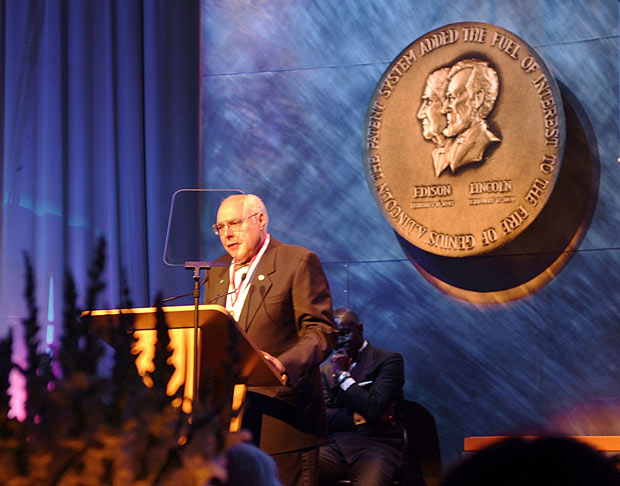
Frank Cepollina, inventor and NASA official

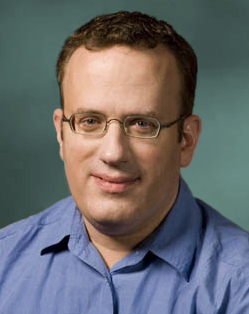
Brendan Eich, creator of JavaScript

- Wenona Giles, academic, fellow of the Royal Society of Canada
- Paul Locatelli S.J. (1960), former Secretary of Jesuit Education for the Society of Jesus and former president of Santa Clara University
- Mary Ann Peters (1972), provost of the Naval War College
- Vincent Price (1979), 10th president of Duke University
- James V. Schall, S.J. Professor at Georgetown University
- Brian Swimme (1972), cosmologist at CIIS

==== Engineering ====
- Frank Cepollina, inventor; National Inventors Hall of Fame; deputy associate director, NASA's Hubble Space Telescope Development Project at NASA's Goddard Space Flight Center
- Brendan Eich, B.Sc. c. 1983, creator of JavaScript, Chief Technology Officer of the Mozilla Corporation
- Robert Freitas (PhD), nanotechnology pioneer and legal scholar
- Chris Malachowsky, M.S., co-founder of NVIDIA
- John T. "Jack" Mullin (1936), pioneer of early magnetic tape recording technology and pioneer of the laugh track
- Kairan Quazi, the youngest graduate, at age 14, in 2023; software engineer at the Starlink branch of SpaceX
- Jayshree Ullal, CEO of Arista Networks

==== Science ====
- David Merritt (1977), astrophysicist at the Rochester Institute of Technology

Clay M. Greene, playwright

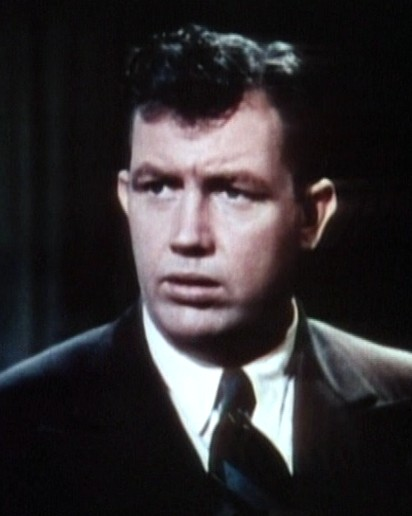
Andy Devine, film and television actor

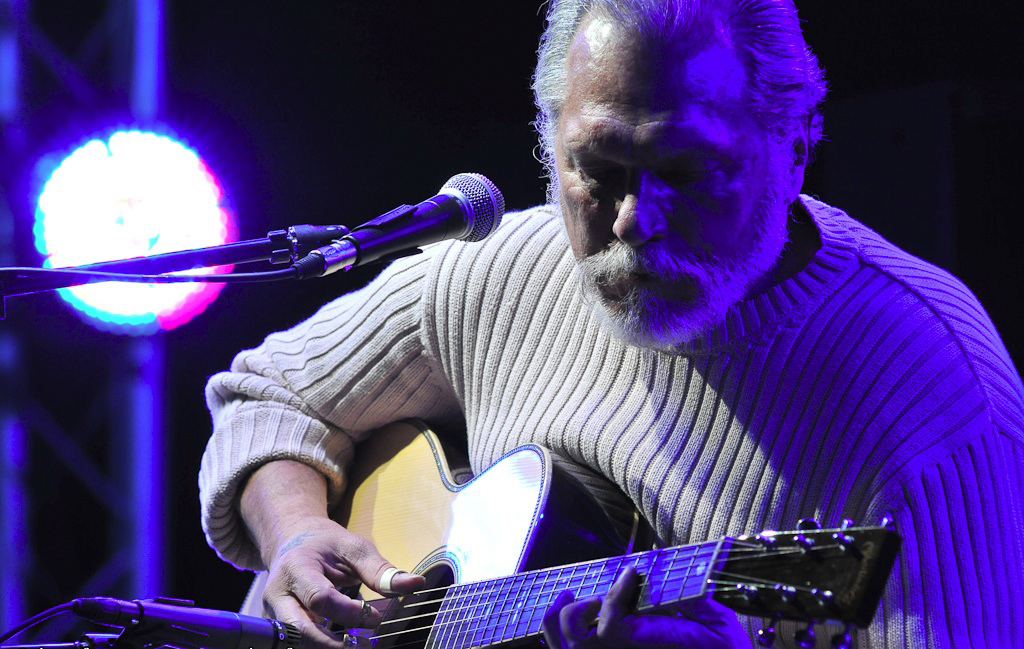
Jorma Kaukonen, Jefferson Airplane guitarist

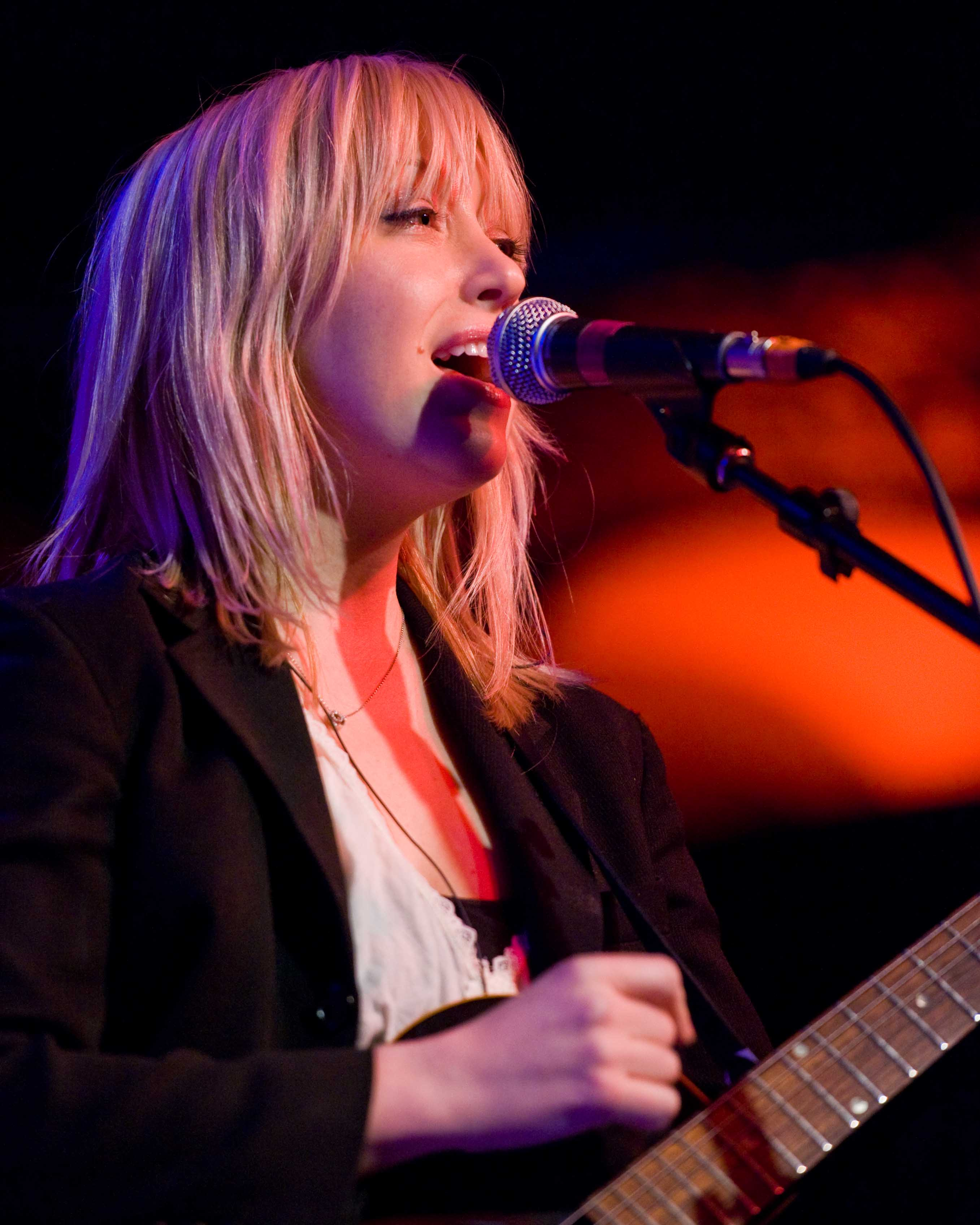
Anya Marina, singer-songwriter

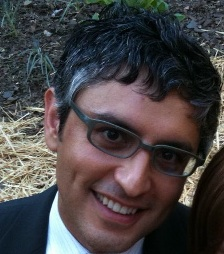
Reza Aslan, author and commentator

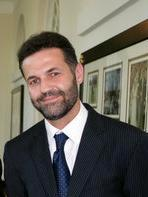
Khaled Hosseini, author

=== Arts and literature ===
==== Artists ====
- Ernest de Saisset, early Californian artist
- Andrew P. Hill, artist and prominent conservationist responsible for the creation of the California State Park System and Big Basin Redwoods State Park
- Manuel Valencia, early California landscape painter

==== Film and television ====
- Andy Ackerman (1978), producer and director, Seinfeld
- Michelle Ashford (1983), Emmy-nominated screenwriter, The Pacific
- Lloyd Bacon, early Hollywood director, Knute Rockne, All American
- Max Baer, Jr., actor and film producer
- John Bailey, director and cinematographer
- Darren Brazil (2007), three-time Emmy Award-winning editor, producer and videographer
- Hank Cheyne (1980), actor
- Jackie Coogan, actor (dropped out)
- Andy Devine, Western character actor
- Bill Duggan, actor
- Nina Garbiras, actress
- Julie Garnyé, actress
- Clay M. Greene (1869), playwright
- Paul Hoen, director and producer
- Jerry Howarth (1968), radio broadcaster for the Toronto Blue Jays
- Neal Jimenez (1982), movie screenwriter and director
- Ron Lagomarsino (1973), movie, stage, and TV director, My Sister's Keeper, Joan of Arcadia, Driving Miss Daisy
- Mary Mazur (1979), television producer, American Family, vice president of KCET
- Sandra McCoy, actress
- Shemar Moore (1992), actor and host
- Alex Nesic, actor
- Barry O'Brien (1979), television writer and producer of Hanging with Mr. Cooper and CSI Miami
- Julie Payne, actress
- Mary Richardson (1968), co-anchor of Boston's WCVB-TV's Chronicle, the nation's longest-running, locally produced nightly news magazine
- Kurtwood Smith (1968), actor; "Red" from That '70s Show
- Michael Trucco, actor
- Adam Zotovich (1997), Broadway producer of The Color Purple, The Addams Family, View From the Bridge

==== Journalism ====
- Jeff Brazil (1985), Pulitzer Prize-winning journalist, Orlando Sentinel
- Lawrence A. Fernsworth, journalist and author
- Ezra Klein, journalist, author and podcaster
- Michael Malone, journalist, author and former editor of Forbes ASAP
- Charles K. McClatchy (1901), former editor of the Sacramento Bee and co-owner of the McClatchy Company
- Valentine S. McClatchy (1879), former editor of the Sacramento Bee and co-owner of the McClatchy Company
- Gordon Young, journalist and author

==== Music ====
- Thomas Buckner (1964), baritone vocalist
- Mahesh Kale, Indian classical vocalist
- Paul Kantner (1959–1961), guitarist, singer, and co-founder of Jefferson Airplane and Jefferson Starship (dropped out)
- Jorma Kaukonen, guitarist of Jefferson Airplane
- Lil Rob, Mexican American rapper, producer, and actor
- Anthony Lun, songwriter, arranger, musical director and singer
- Anya Marina, singer-songwriter
- Anthony Quartuccio (1987), music director of West Coast Lyric Opera
- Kevin Waters (1965), composer, Jesuit priest, educator

==== Writers ====
- Everett Alvarez, author
- Reza Aslan (1995), Iranian-American scholar and author of No god but God
- Gina M. Biegel (M.A. 2005), author and psychotherapist
- James Billmaier (1977), author
- Lewis Buzbee (1979), author
- James W. Douglass (1960), author and activist
- Lawrence A. Fernsworth (1914), author and journalist
- Robert Freitas, author
- Ron Hansen, author, The Assassination of Jesse James by the Coward Robert Ford
- Bill Hayes, non-fiction writer and photographer
- Khaled Hosseini (1988), international bestselling author of the nationally best-selling novels The Kite Runner and A Thousand Splendid Suns
- Francisco Jimenez (1966), author and educator
- Holly Kearl (2005), author
- Robert Kinerk, author, journalist and playwright
- Bob LaMonte, NFL agent and author of Winning the NFL Way, Leadership Lessons from Some of the NFL's Top Head Coaches
- Michael Malone (M.B.A. 1977), author and former editor of Forbes ASAP
- Tom McEnery, author
- William McKnight (M.B.A. 1994), author and businessman
- Kelly Moore, New York Times bestselling author of Deadly Medicine and Amber House
- Dee Dee Myers, author and political commentator
- Paul C. Paquet (1970), author and biologist
- James V. Schall, writer, philosopher, priest, and educator
- Sherrie Gong Taguchi, author

=== Justices ===
==== U.S. state and territorial supreme court justices ====
- Robert D. Durham (J.D. 1972), associate justice of Oregon Supreme Court
- William G. Lorigan (Ph.D. 1903), justice of the Supreme Court of California
- Douglas Moylan, judge on Guam's Supreme Court
- Edward A. Panelli (1953) (J.D. 1955), chief justice of Supreme Court of California

==== U.S. federal appellate judges and state appellate justices ====
- Martin J. Jenkins (1977), associate justice of the California Supreme Court, former justice of the California Court of Appeal for the First District, former federal judge of the United States District Court for the Northern District of California
- Edward A. Panelli (J.D. 1955), former justice of the California Court of Appeal Sixth District and retired chief justice of Supreme Court of California
- Charles Poochigian (J.D. 1975), associate justice, California Court of Appeal Fifth District
- Eugene M. Premo (J.D. 1962), associate justice of the California Court of Appeal 6th District
- Richard C. Tallman (1975), senior judge for the United States Court of Appeals for the Ninth Circuit
- Thomas Tang (1947), judge for the United States Court of Appeals for the Ninth Circuit and first Chinese American appointed to the Federal Judiciary
- William Thorne (1974), justice of the Utah Court of Appeals

==== U.S. federal district court judges ====
- Samuel Conti, judge, U.S. District Court
- Phyllis Hamilton (1976), judge, United States District Court for the Northern District of California
- Martin J. Jenkins (1977), former federal judge of the United States District Court for the Northern District of California
- Eugene Lynch (1953), judge, United States District Court for the Northern District of California
- James Francis Smith (1878), federal justice for the United States Court of Customs and Patent Appeals

==== U.S. state judges ====
- Alfred Delucchi (J.D. 1960), judge, Alameda Superior Court, and judge who presided over the trial of Scott Peterson
- Francis Devaney (1983), judge, San Diego County Superior Court
- Eugene Michael Hyman (J.D. 1977), judge, Santa Clara County Superior Court
- Lawrence Terry (1957), judge, Santa Clara County Superior Court
- Mark Thomas (1956), judge, Santa Clara County Superior Court

=== Entrepreneurs and business leaders ===
- Everett Alvarez (1960), president of Conwal Consulting
- William Dallas (1987), founder and owner, Dallas Capital
- David Drummond (1985), vice president and general counsel, Google
- Fred Franzia (1965), owner of Bronco Winery and maker of Charles Shaw wine, potentially the largest grape producer in California
- Pat Gelsinger (1983), former CEO of VMware and Intel
- Pansy Ho (1985), managing director Shun Tak Holdings and Sociedade de Turismo e Diversões de Macau
- Jack Kuehler (1954), former president of IBM
- Thomas Lavelle (1976), senior vice president, general counsel, Rambus
- Thomas E. Leavey (1922), co-founder of Farmers Insurance
- Chris Malachowsky (M.S. 1986), co-founder and Senior Vice President of Engineering and Operations, NVIDIA
- Peter Oppenheimer (M.B.A. 1987), CFO and senior vice president of Apple Computer
- George Reyes (M.B.A 1979), CFO, and former senior vice president, Google
- Stephen Schott (1960), former owner of the Oakland Athletics
- John A. Sobrato (1960), billionaire owner and chairman, Sobrato Development Companies
- Thomas D. Terry (S.J.), president of Novitiate Wines
- Jayshree Ullal, CEO of Arista Networks

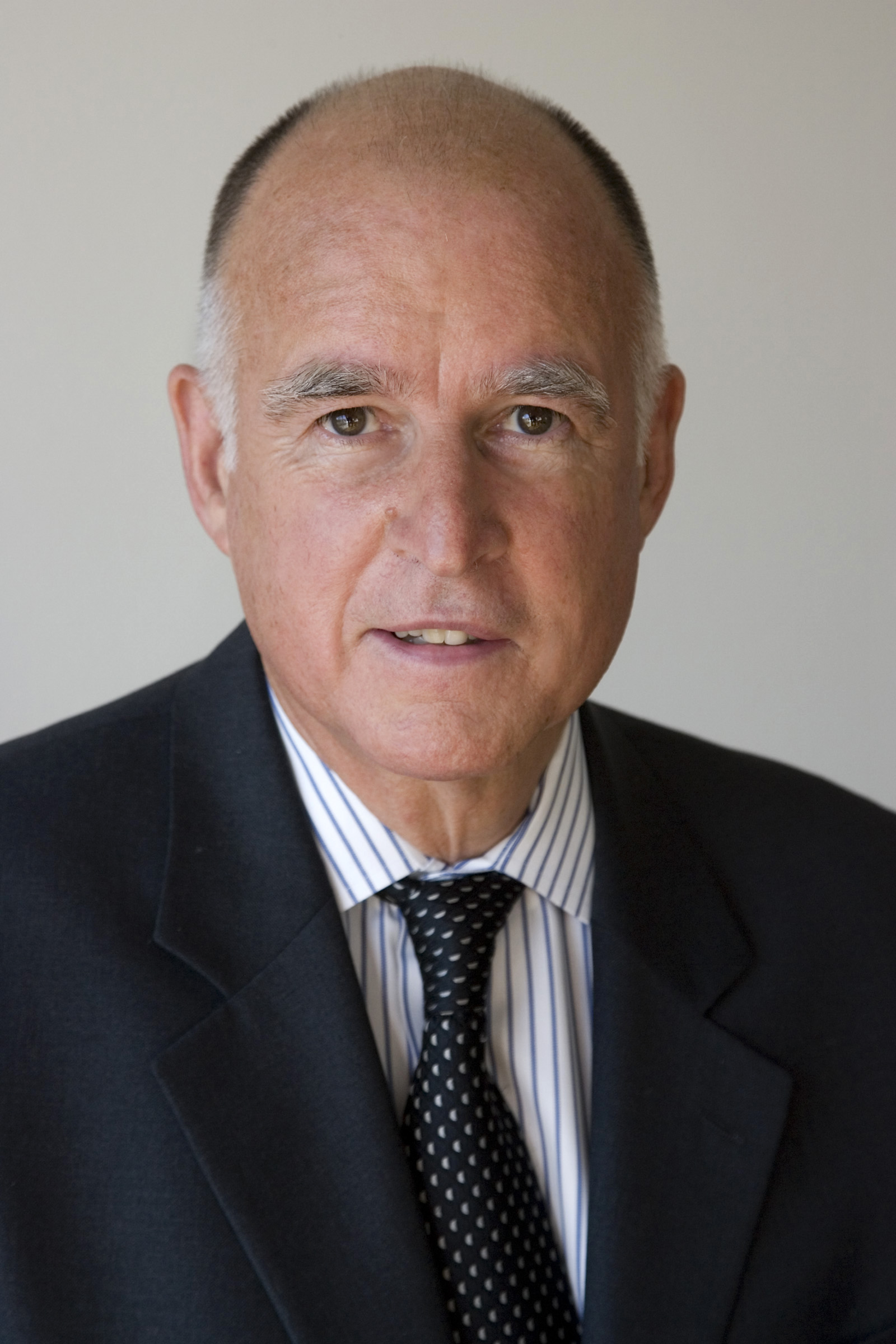
Jerry Brown, governor of California

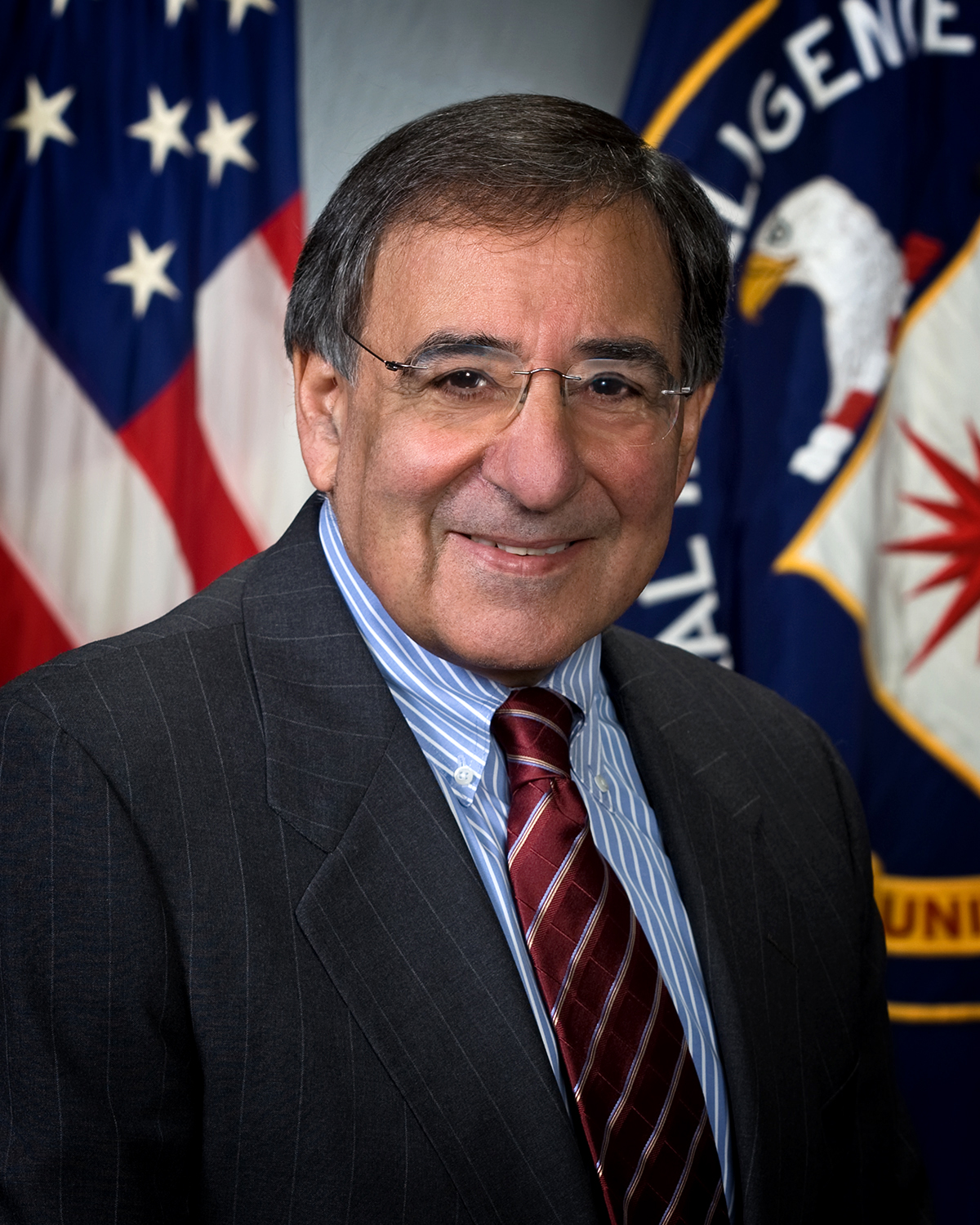
Leon Panetta, U.S. Secretary of Defense, former director of the CIA, and Clinton chief of staff

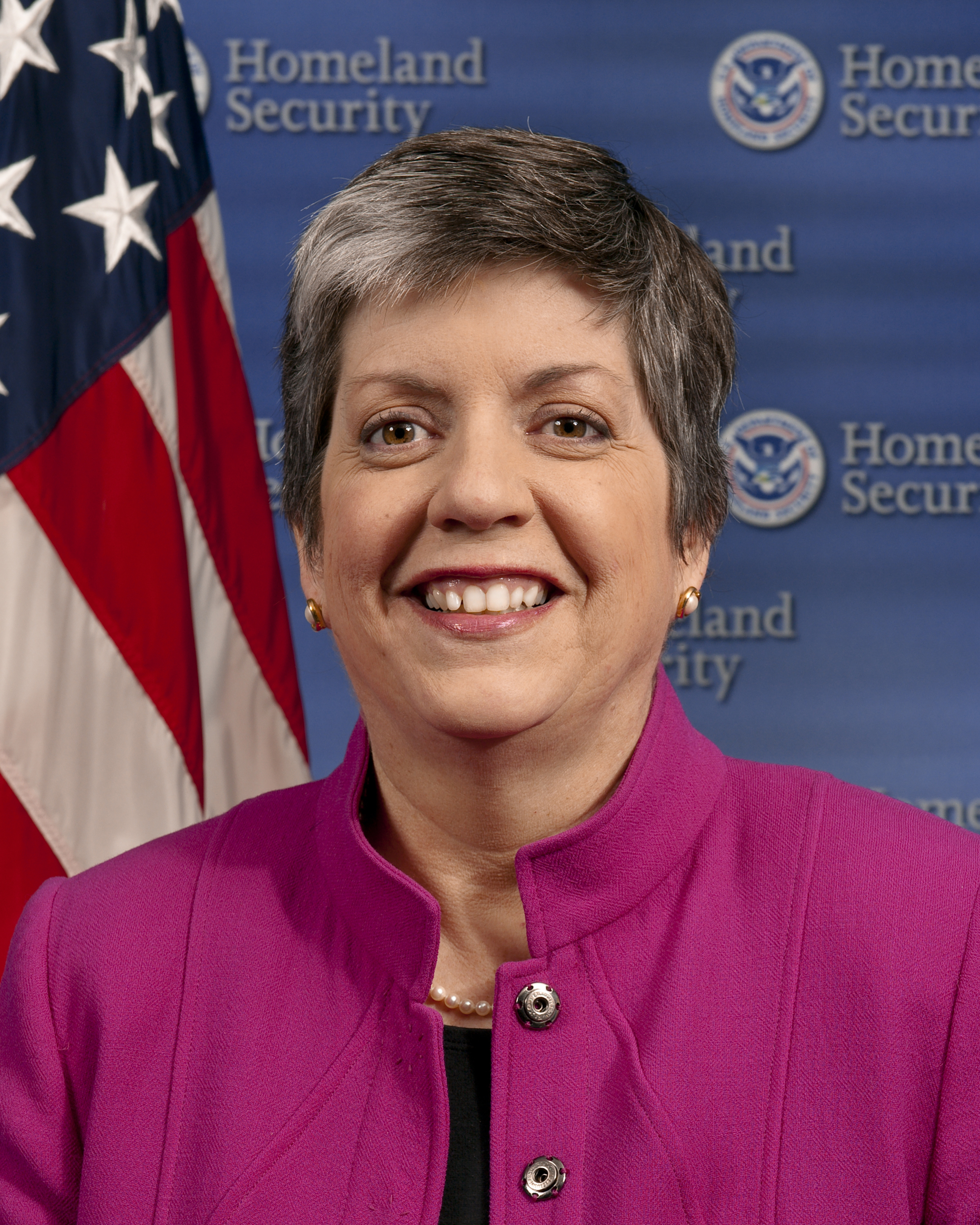
Janet Napolitano, United States Secretary of Homeland Security

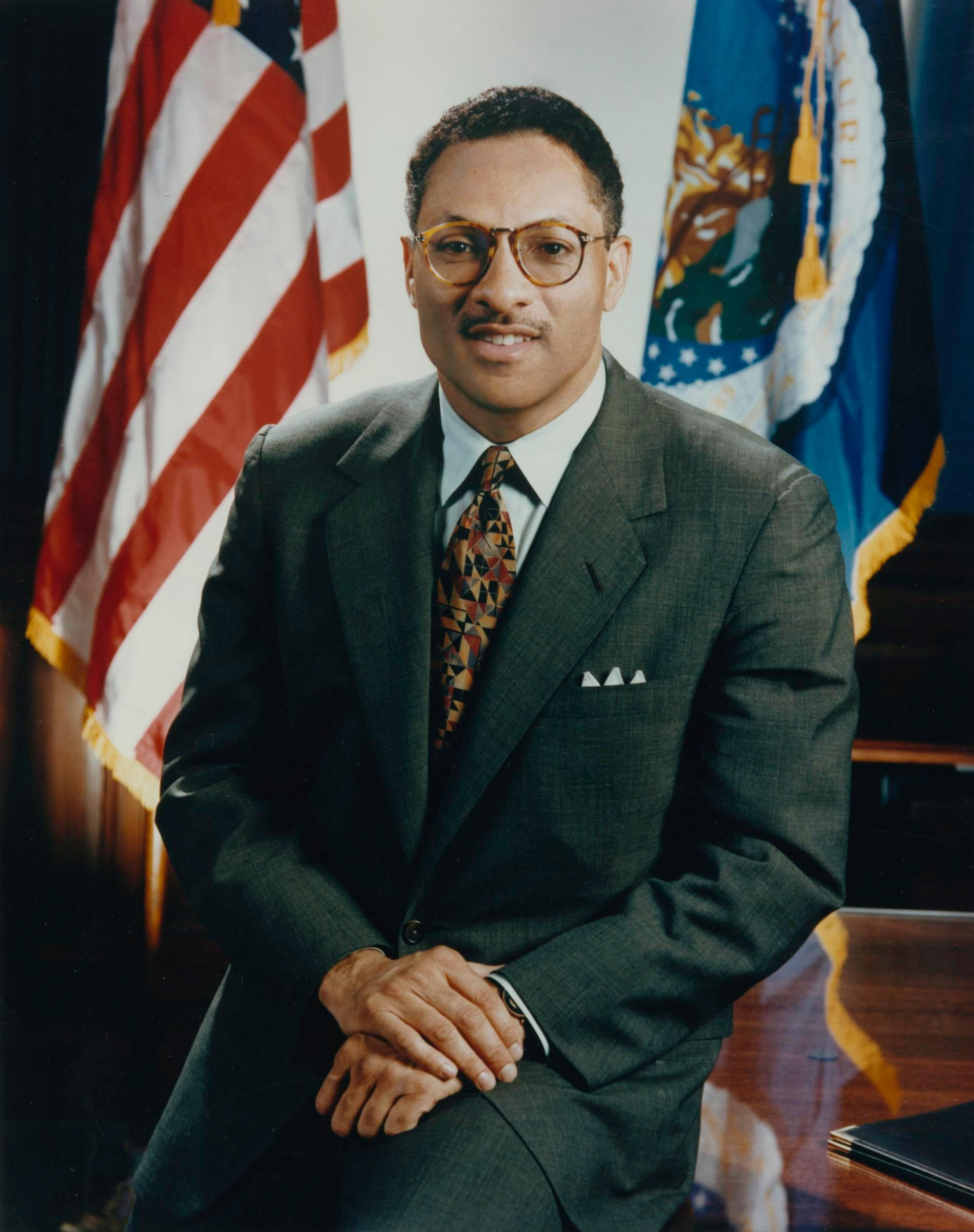
Mike Epsy, former Secretary of Agriculture

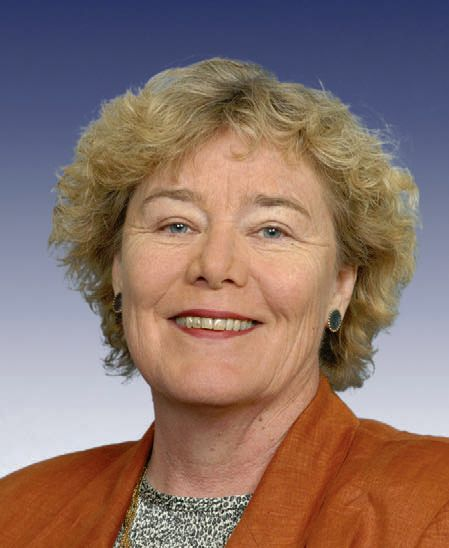
Zoe Lofgren, member, U.S. House of Representatives

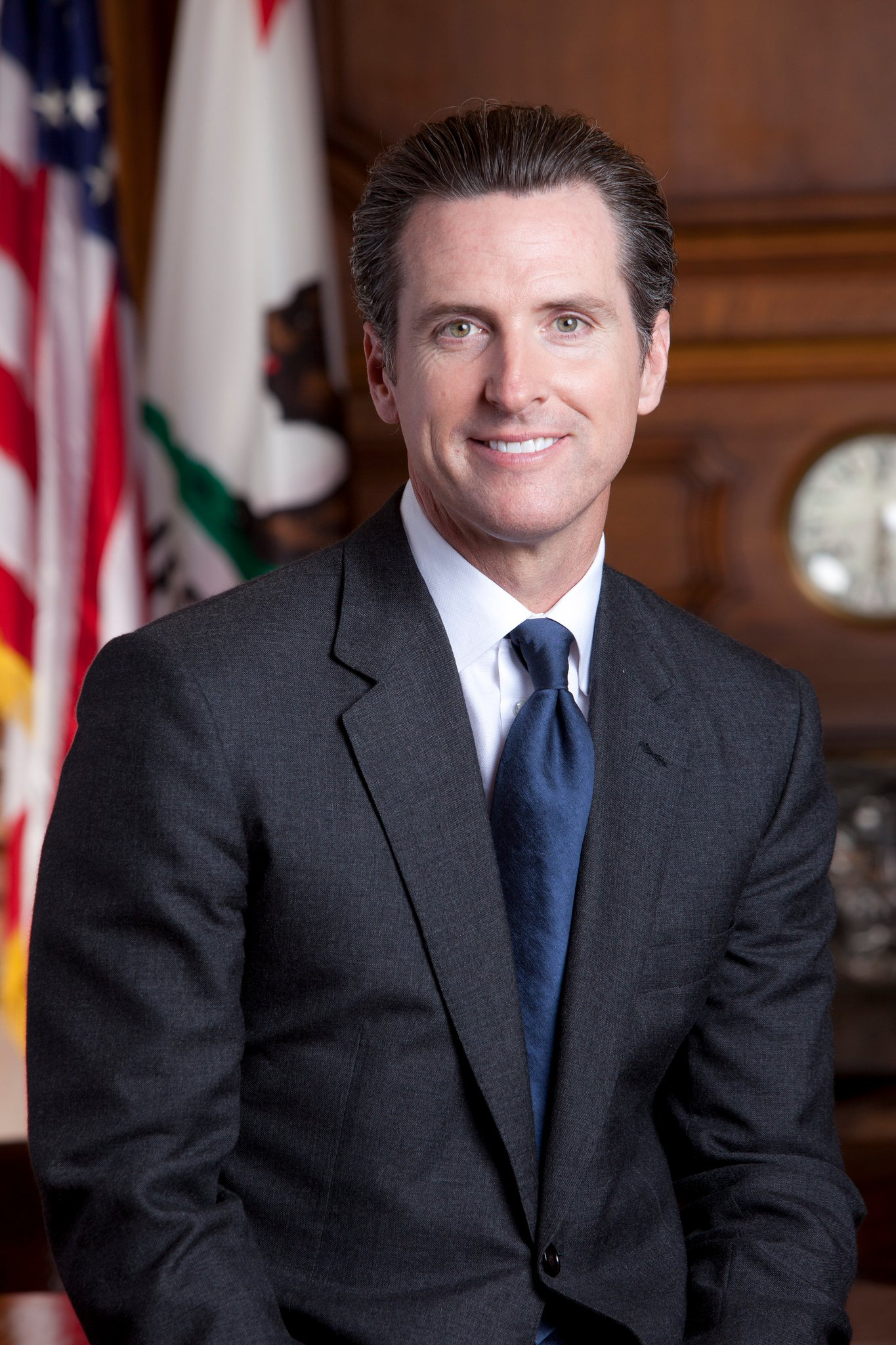
Gavin Newsom, lt. governor of California, former mayor of San Francisco

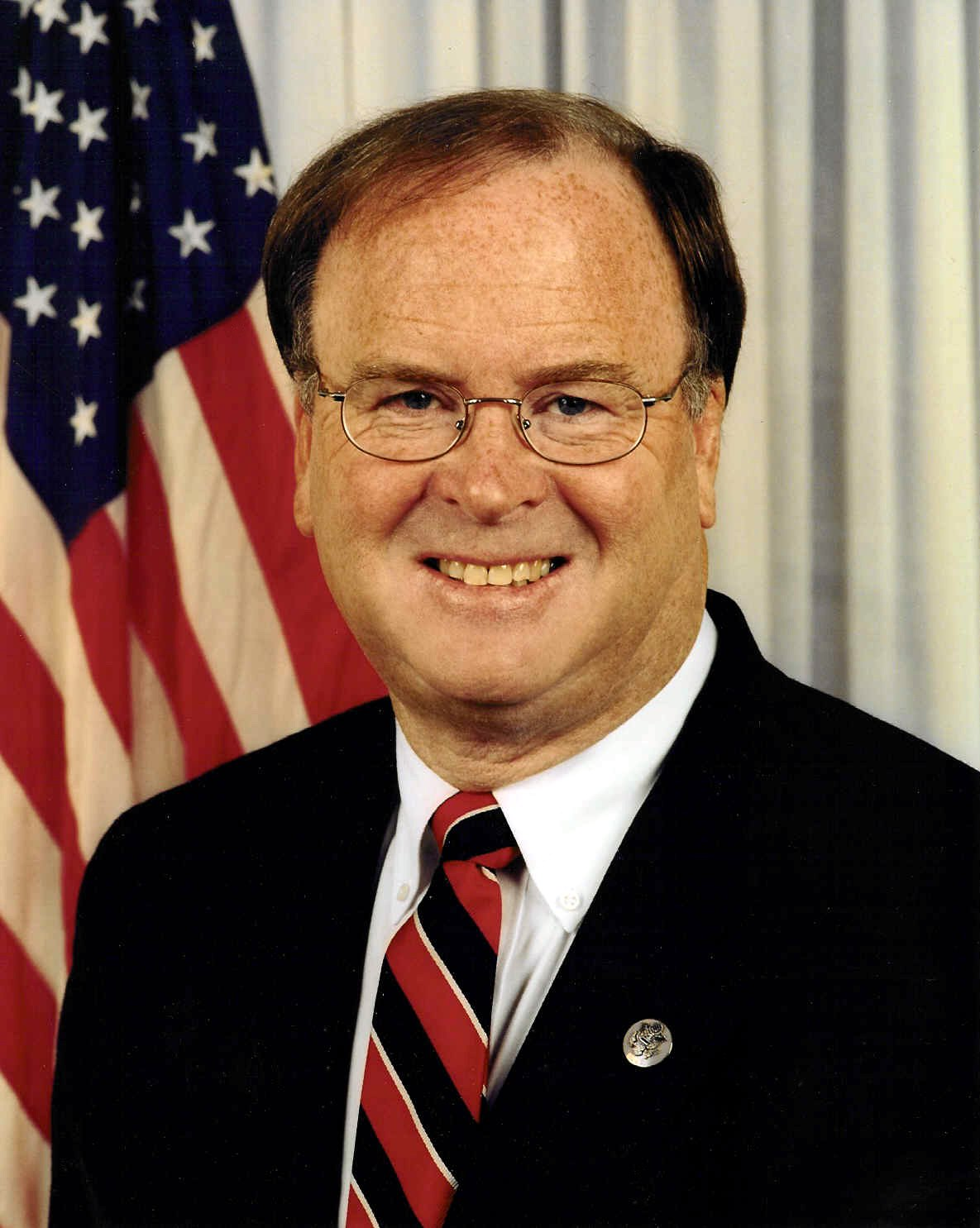
Sam Farr, member, U.S. House of Representatives

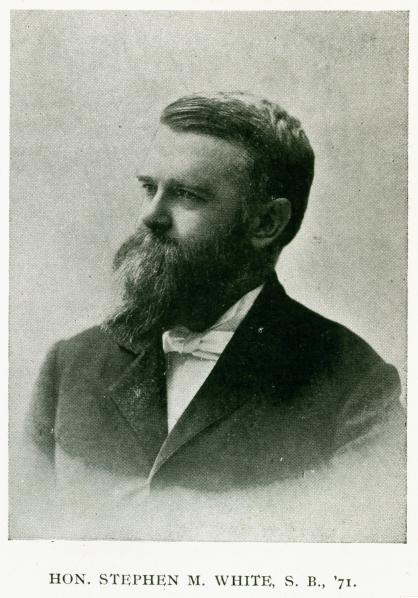
Stephen White, early state senator

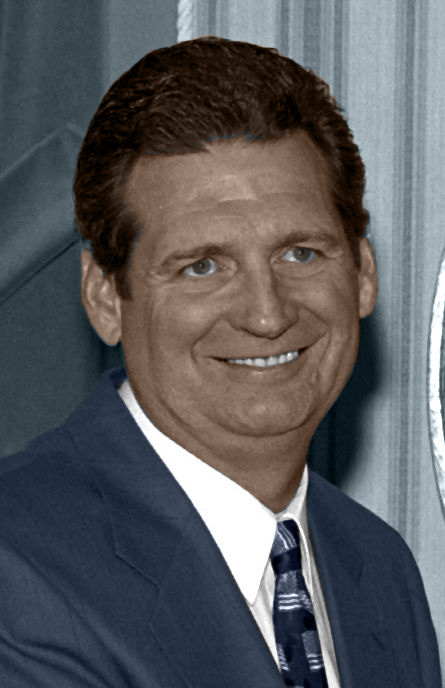
Bob Miller, former governor of Nevada

=== Politics and government ===
==== Cabinet members ====
- Mike Espy (J.D. 1978), 25th U.S. Secretary of Agriculture and first African-American Secretary of Agriculture and member of the United States House of Representatives
- Dee Dee Myers (1983), 20th White House Press Secretary
- Janet Napolitano (1979), 3rd United States Secretary of Homeland Security (under President Barack Obama), 21st governor of Arizona and 23rd attorney general of Arizona
- Leon Panetta (1960), 23rd United States Secretary of Defense, 21st director of the CIA, former U.S. congressman, 29th director of the Office of Management and Budget, 18th White House chief of staff, chair of the United States House Committee on the Budget

==== United States senators ====
- Paul Laxalt (J.D.), former U.S. senator from Nevada, 22nd governor of Nevada and 23rd lieutenant governor of Nevada
- Frank Murkowski (1955), former U.S. senator from Alaska and 8th governor of Alaska
- Stephen Mallory White (1871), former U.S. senator from California, member of California State Senate as president pro tempore

==== United States representatives ====
- John H. Burke, member of the United States House of Representatives
- Mike Espy (J.D. 1978), member of the United States House of Representatives, 25th U.S. Secretary of Agriculture and first African-American Secretary of Agriculture
- Sam Farr, former member of the United States House of Representatives
- Cecil R. King, former member of Congress, California (fourteen terms)
- Robert J. Lagomarsino (J.D.1953), former member of the United States House of Representatives and former member of California State Senate
- Zoe Lofgren (J.D. 1975), member of the United States House of Representatives and Chairman of the House Ethics Committee
- Jimmy Panetta, member of the United States House of Representatives
- Leon Panetta (1960), former member of the United States House of Representatives, 21st and former Director of the CIA, 29th Director of the Office of Management and Budget, 18th White House Chief of Staff, chairperson of the United States House Committee on the Budget
- Howard Wallace Pollock, former member of the United States House of Representatives
- William Howard Royer, former member of the United States House of Representatives

==== Governors ====
- Jerry Brown (1959), 34th and 39th governor of California, 31st attorney general of California, 44th mayor of Oakland and 24th Secretary of State of California
- Gavin Newsom (1989), 40th governor of California, 49th lieutenant governor of California and 42nd mayor of San Francisco
- Paul Laxalt (J.D.), 22nd governor of Nevada, former U.S. senator from Nevada, and 23rd lieutenant governor of Nevada
- Bob Miller (1967), 26th governor of Nevada and 29th lieutenant governor of Nevada
- Frank Murkowski (1955), 8th governor of Alaska and United States senator for Alaska
- Janet Napolitano (1979), 21st governor of Arizona, 3rd United States Secretary of Homeland Security, and 23rd attorney general of Arizona

==== Lieutenant governors ====
- Paul Laxalt (J.D.), 23rd lieutenant governor of Nevada and former U.S. senator from Nevada and 22nd governor of Nevada
- Bob Miller (1967), 29th lieutenant governor of Nevada and 26th governor of Nevada
- Gavin Newsom (1989), 49th lieutenant governor of California and 42nd mayor of San Francisco

==== U.S. statewide officials ====
- Jerry Brown (1959), 31st attorney general of California, 34th and 39th governor of California, 44th mayor of Oakland and 24th Secretary of State of California
- B. T. Collins, former member of the California State Assembly
- Heidi Gansert, former Nevada state senator and member of the Nevada Assembly
- Thomas M. Hannigan, former majority leader of the California Assembly
- David C. Long (J.D.), Indiana state senator, president pro tempore and chair for Rules & Legislative Procedure
- Bernard D. Murphy (B.A. 1865), former California state senator and member of the California State Assembly
- Patrick W. Murphy (B.S. 1860s), former California state senator and member of the California State Assembly
- Janet Napolitano (1979), 23rd attorney general of Arizona, 3rd United States Secretary of Homeland Security, and 21st governor of Arizona
- Leon Panetta (1960), 29th director of the Office of Management and Budget, 21st director of the CIA, former U.S. congressman, 18th White House Chief of Staff, chairperson of the United States House Committee on the Budget
- Charles Poochigian (J.D. 1975), former California state senator
- Curren Price (J.D.), member of the Los Angeles City Council, former California state senator, former member of the California State Assembly
- Gregory P. Schmidt (1968), Secretary of the California State Senate
- Augustus D. Splivalo (1859), former California treasurer
- Mark Stone, former member of the California State Assembly
- Vincent Thomas, former member of the California State Assembly
- Bob Wieckowski, former California state senator and member of the California State Assembly
- John Vasconcellos, former California state senator and member of the California State Assembly

==== Other U.S. political officials ====
- Richard Bissen, mayor of Maui County, Hawaii
- Giovanni Capriglione, member of the Texas House of Representatives
- Dominic Caserta, former member of the Santa Clara City Council.
- Dominic L. Cortese, former member of the California State Assembly
- Benjamin J. Cruz (1975), chief justice of the Supreme Court of Guam, attorney general on Guam's Superior Court, secretary general, vice president, and treasurer of Guam National Olympic Committee
- Anthony P. Hamann (1932), former city manager of San Jose, California
- Arthur Hull Hayes, former FDA commissioner, doctor, first SCU Rhodes Scholar
- Lindsay James (2003), member of the Iowa House of Representatives
- Arturo Jaramillo (1975), head of Regulation and Licensing Department for the State of California
- Suzy Loftus (1996), former district attorney of San Francisco
- Patricia Mahan (J.D. 1980), mayor of Santa Clara
- Tom McEnery (M.A. 1967), 61st mayor of San Jose, California
- R. Burnett Miller, mayor of Sacramento, California
- Mary Ann Peters, former United States Ambassador to Bangladesh
- Gary Podesto (1963), former mayor of Stockton
- Richard Riordan (1952), 39th mayor of Los Angeles
- Albert J. Ruffo (1936), 48th mayor of San Jose
- McGregor W. Scott, U.S. attorney for the Eastern District of California
- Carrie Woerner, member of the New York State Assembly
- Anthony Williams (1973), 5th mayor of Washington, D.C.

==== Other non-U.S. political officials ====
- Yukiwo P. Dengokl, member of the Senate of Palau
- Jamby Madrigal (B.S. Economics), member of the Senate of the Philippines
- José Abad Santos (Pre-Law 1905), 5th chief justice of the Supreme Court of the Philippines, associate justice of the Supreme Court of the Philippines and Secretary of Justice

==== Public service ====
- Gordon Belcourt, former executive director of the Montana-Wyoming Tribal Leaders Council
- Elizabeth Birch (1985), executive director of Human Rights Campaign

===== Other =====
- Eileen Kato (J.D. 1980), special assistant to the U.S. attorney for Western Washington District; former president of the Washington State District and Municipal Judges Association
- Murlene Randle (J.D. 1980), director of the Office of Criminal Justice for San Francisco

=== Military ===
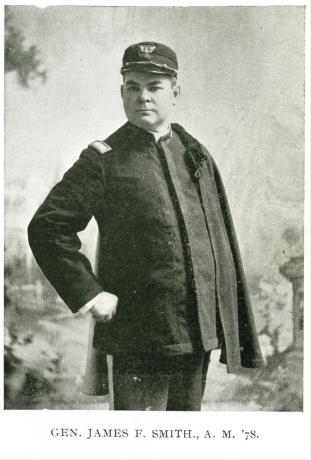
US Army Brigadier General James F. Smith

- Eugene M. Premo (1957), first lieutenant in the United States Army Counterintelligence Corps
- Eldon Regua (1977), major general, United States Army Reserve; commanding general, 75th Division
- James Francis Smith (1878), brigadier general, United States Army; governor-general of Philippine Islands
- Charles E. Stanton, military colonel and aid to General John J. Pershing in World War I; coined the phrase "Lafayette, we are here!" which was initially attributed to Pershing

=== Other ===
- Brooke Hart, murder victim
- Dan Kaminsky, computer security researcher
- Selina Kuruleca, Fijian psychotherapist and public commentator
- James Pike, controversial Episcopal bishop
- Robert W. McElroy, Catholic cardinal and archbishop of Washington

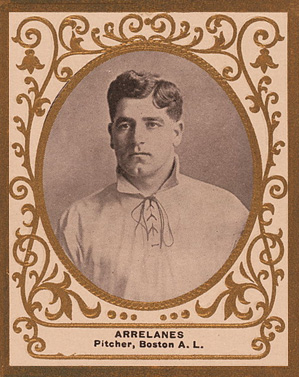
Frank Arellanes, early baseball player

Hal Chase, early baseball player

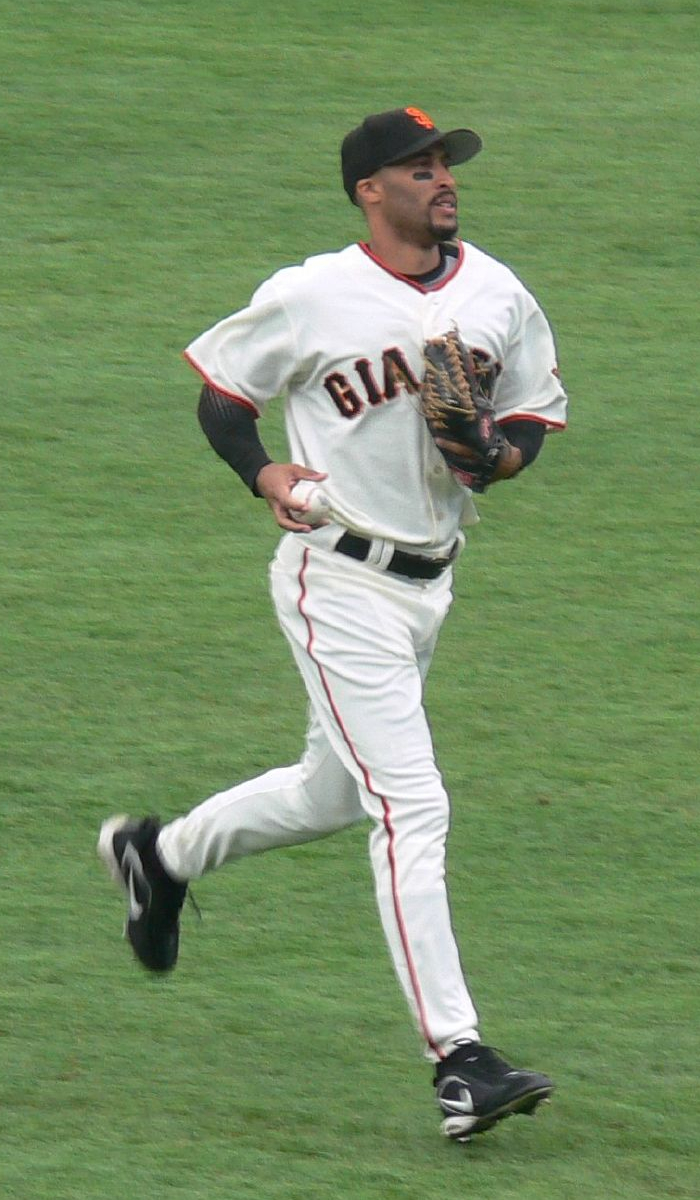
Randy Winn, retired professional baseball player

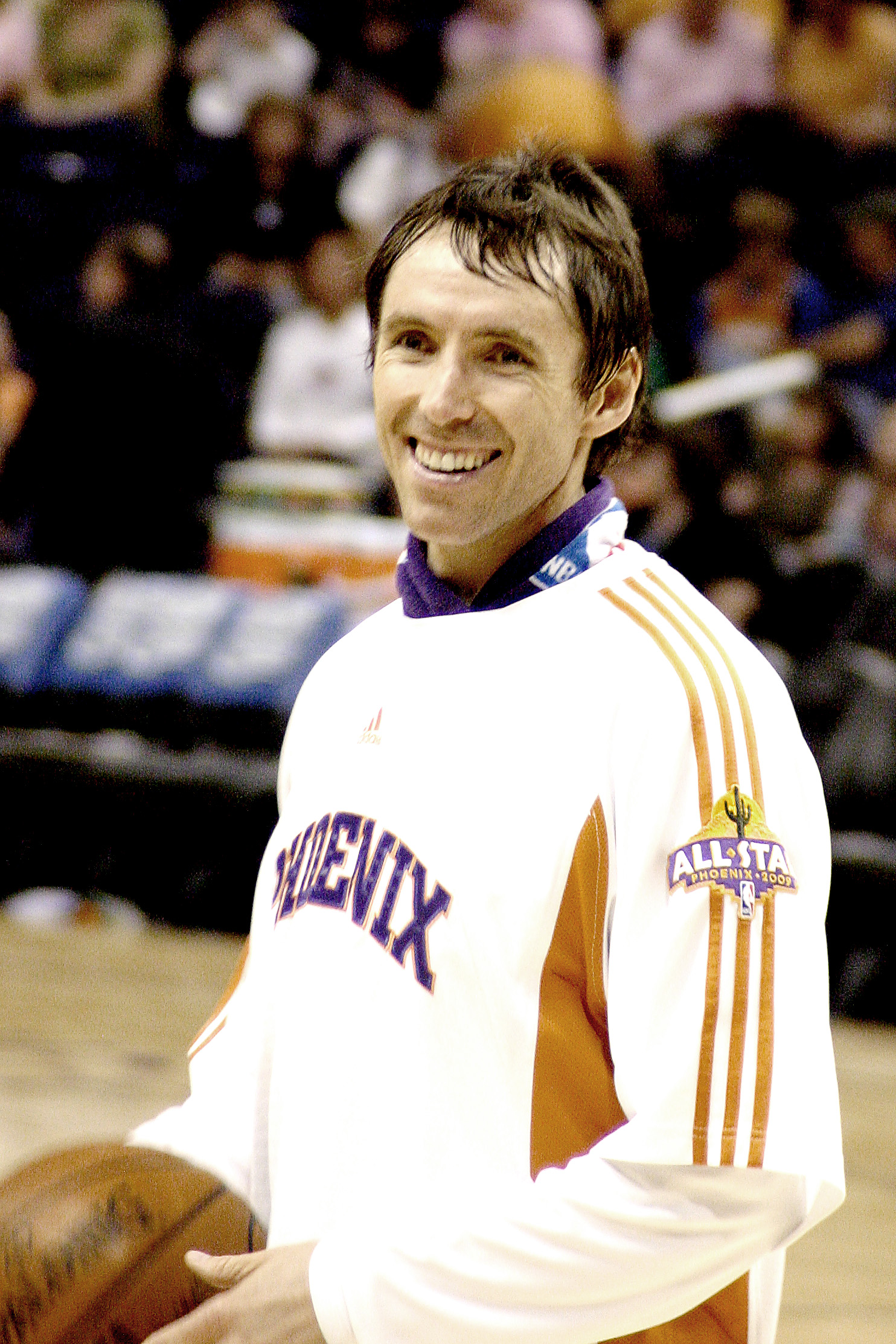
Steve Nash, professional basketball player, NBA MVP

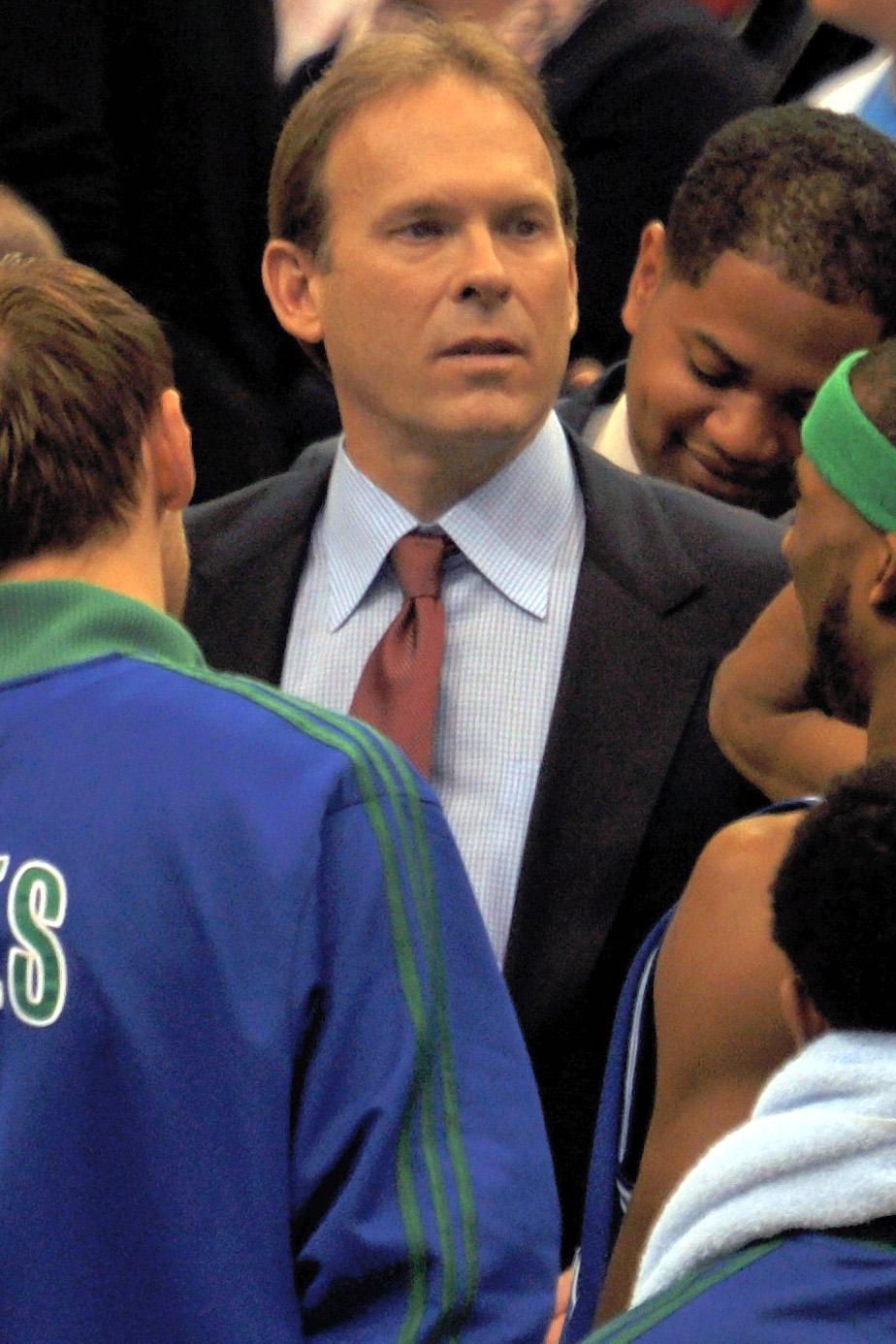
Kurt Rambis, retired professional basketball player

== Athletes ==
=== Baseball ===
- Frank Arellanes, professional MLB baseball player, pitcher for the Boston Red Sox and commonly believed to be the first Mexican American to play in the American League
- Hardin Barry, MLB player, pitcher for Oakland Athletics
- Wayne Belardi, MLB player, first baseman for the Brooklyn Dodgers and Detroit Tigers
- Lou Berberet, MLB player, New York Yankees, Washington Senators, Boston Red Sox, and Detroit Tigers
- John Boccabella, MLB player, Chicago Cubs
- Bruce Bochte, MLB player, former MLB all-star and player for the California Angels, Cleveland Indians, Seattle Mariners, and Oakland Athletics
- Nelson Briles, MLB player, Kansas City Royals, Pittsburgh Pirates, Texas Rangers, and St. Louis Cardinals
- Al Carson, MLB player, Chicago Cubs
- Hal Chase, MLB player, first baseman for the New York Yankees, Chicago White Sox, Cincinnati Reds, New York Giants manager of New York Yankees and named on the 100 Greatest Baseball Players of All Time
- Scott Chiamparino, MLB player, pitcher for the Texas Rangers
- Victor Cole, MLB player, pitcher for the Milwaukee Brewers, San Diego Padres, Pittsburgh Pirates, and Russia national baseball team
- Mike Crudale, MLB player, St. Louis Cardinals and Milwaukee Brewers
- Tim Cullen, MLB player, Texas Rangers, Chicago White Sox and Oakland Athletics
- Jan Dukes, MLB player, pitcher for the Texas Rangers
- Ernie Fazio, MLB player, Houston Colt 45s
- Justin Fitzgerald, MLB player, New York Yankees and Philadelphia Phillies
- Mike Frank, MLB player, Cincinnati Reds and New York Yankees
- Al Gallagher, MLB player, baseball player, San Francisco Giants
- Bob Garibaldi, MLB player, San Francisco Giants and College World Series Most Outstanding Player
- Ed Giovanola, MLB player, 1995 World Series Champion, played for the Atlanta Braves and San Diego Padres
- Greg Gohr, MLB player, pitcher for the Detroit Tigers and LA Angels
- Charlie Graham, MLB player, Boston Red Sox
- Nelson Hawks, MLB player, New York Yankees and Philadelphia Phillies
- Willie Hogan, MLB player, Oakland Athletics and St. Louis Browns
- Pat Jacquez, MLB player, Chicago White Sox
- Erv Kantlehner, MLB player, Pittsburgh Pirates and Philadelphia Phillies
- Bobby Keefe, MLB player, New York Yankees and Cincinnati Reds
- Earl Kunz, MLB player, Pittsburgh Pirates
- Pat Larkin, MLB player, San Francisco Giants
- Duane Larson, scout for the Atlanta Braves
- Bill Lawrence, MLB player, Detroit Tigers
- Bevo LeBourveau, MLB player, Philadelphia Phillies
- Larry Loughlin, MLB player, Philadelphia Phillies
- Mike Macfarlane, MLB player, Boston Red Sox, Kansas City Royals, and Oakland Athletics; former ESPN analyst (local broadcaster)
- Pete Magrini, MLB player, Boston Red Sox
- Jim Mangan, MLB player, catcher for the Pittsburgh Pirates and New York Giants
- Fran Mullins, MLB player, Chicago White Sox, San Francisco Giants and Cleveland Indians
- Daniel Nava, MLB player, Boston Red Sox
- Jimmy O'Connell, MLB player, New York Giants
- Jim O'Rourke, MLB player, St. Louis Cardinals
- Marv Owen, MLB player, Detroit Tigers, Chicago White Sox, and Boston Red Sox
- Duane Pillette, MLB player, New York Yankees and Philadelphia Phillies
- Bill Renna, MLB player, New York Yankees and Boston Red Sox
- Dino Restelli, MLB player, Pittsburgh Pirates
- Rich Robertson, MLB player, San Francisco Giants
- Roger Samuels, MLB player, San Francisco Giants and Pittsburgh Pirates
- John Savage, UCLA Bruins baseball head coach
- Frank Shellenback, MLB player, pitcher for the Chicago White Sox, pitching coach for St. Louis Browns, Red Sox, Detroit Tigers, and New York Giants; elected to Pacific Coast League Hall of Fame; has most wins in Pacific Coast League history
- Bob Spence, MLB player, Chicago White Sox
- Elmer Stricklett, MLB player, pitcher for the Chicago White Sox and LA Dodgers
- Rich Troedson, MLB player, San Diego Padres
- Jim Wilhelm, MLB player, San Diego Padres
- Randy Winn, MLB player, San Francisco Giants and 2002 Major League Baseball All-Star Game
- Harry Wolter, MLB player, Cincinnati Reds, Pittsburgh Pirates, St. Louis Cardinals, Boston Red Sox, New York Yankees, Chicago Cubs

=== Basketball ===
- Dennis Awtrey (1970), former professional basketball player for the Philadelphia 76ers, Phoenix Suns, and Seattle SuperSonics
- Bill Duffy
- Bob Feerick
- Bob Garibaldi
- Marlon Garnett, former National Basketball Association player
- Allen Graves
- Bruce Hale
- Bob Heaney
- Brian Jones
- Harold Keeling
- Mark McNamara
- Steve Nash (1996), National Basketball Association player; 2005, 2006 NBA MVP
- Bud Ogden
- Ralph Ogden
- Dick O'Keefe
- Marty Passaglia
- Stan Patrick
- Lloyd Pierce, NBA head coach, Atlanta Hawks 2018–2022, various other NBA head assistant positions
- Brandin Podziemski
- Kurt Rambis (1980), National Basketball Association player; NBA champion with the Los Angeles Lakers; assistant coach of the Los Angeles Lakers
- Steve Ross
- Uwe Sauer
- Kenny Sears, former professional basketball player, New York Knicks and San Francisco Warriors, first basketball player to appear on the cover of Sports Illustrated magazine
- Mike Stewart
- Nick Vanos
- Jalen Williams, Oklahoma City Thunder, 2025 NBA Champion

=== American football ===
Santa Clara University has had a number of notable American football players. The following list includes former Santa Clara University football players who have become professional players. On February 2, 1993, the university announced its discontinuation of American football.

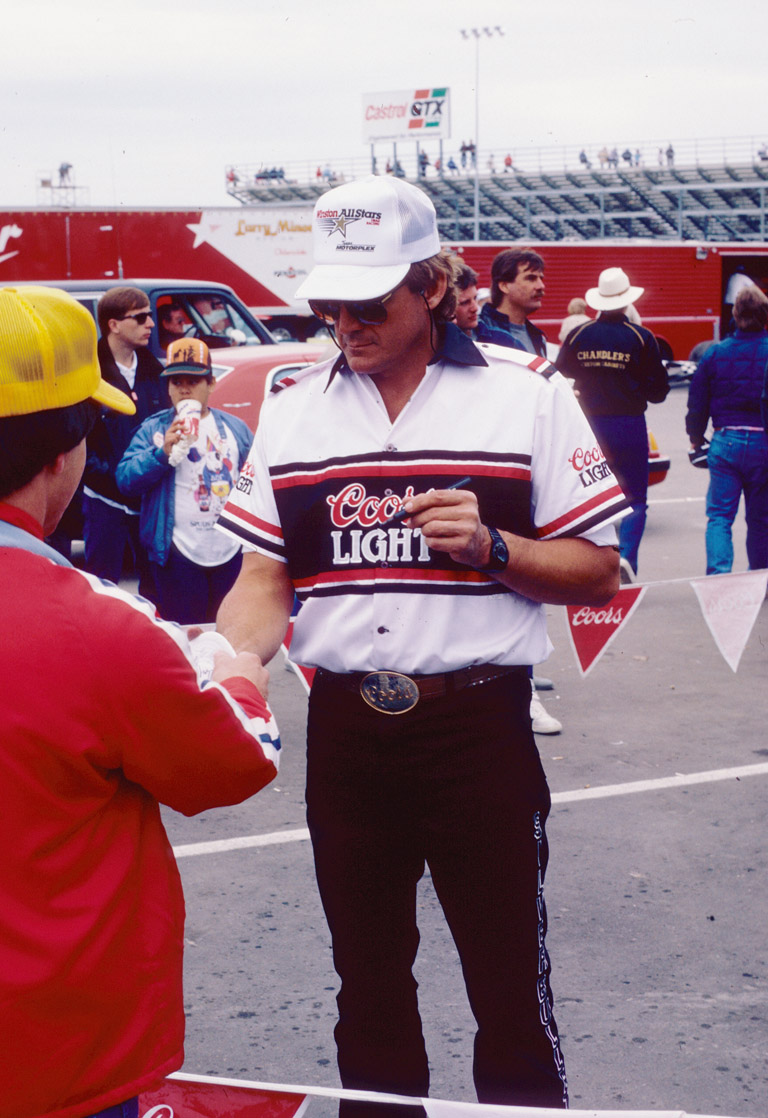
Dan Pastorini, professional football player

- Lee Artoe, NFL offensive tackle for Chicago Bears, Los Angeles Dons and Indianapolis Colts
- Roy Baker, NFL running back for Green Bay Packers
- Bryan Barker, NFL punter for St. Louis Rams
- Dick Bassi, NFL offensive guard and linebacker for Chicago Bears, Philadelphia Eagles, Pittsburgh Steelers and San Francisco 49ers
- Alyn Beals, NFL defensive end for San Francisco 49ers
- Mike Carey (1971), NFL official and owner of Seirus Innovation
- Ted Connolly, NFL offensive guard for San Francisco 49ers and Cleveland Browns
- Frank Cope, NFL offensive tackle and defensive tackle for New York Giants
- Doug Cosbie, NFL tight end for Dallas Cowboys, three-time Pro-Bowler
- Phil Dougherty, NFL center and linebacker for Chicago Cardinals
- Nello Falaschi, NFL running back and linebacker for New York Giants
- Tom Fears, NFL end for Los Angeles Rams
- Jesse Freitas
- Mike Garzoni, NFL offensive guard and defensive guard for Washington Redskins and New York Giants
- Visco Grgich, NFL offensive guard, offensive tackle, defensive guard and linebacker for San Francisco 49ers
- Hall Haynes, NFL defensive back and halfback for Washington Redskins and Los Angeles Rams
- Jerry Hennessy, NFL defensive end for Chicago Cardinals and Washington Redskins
- John Hock, NFL offensive guard and offensive tackle for Chicago Cardinals and Los Angeles Rams
- Gary Hoffman, NFL offensive tackle for Green Bay Packers and San Francisco 49ers
- Brent Jones, NFL tight end for San Francisco 49ers, 4-time Pro Bowler, 3-time World Champion, CBS NFL analyst
- Bill McPherson, San Francisco 49ers former assistant head coach
- Gern Nagler, NFL end for Chicago Cardinals, Pittsburgh Steelers and Cleveland Browns
- John Nolan, NFL offensive guard for Los Angeles Buccaneers
- Dan Pastorini, NFL quarterback for Houston Oilers, Oakland Raiders, Los Angeles Rams and Philadelphia Eagles, Pro Bowl football player for the Houston Oilers
- Jason Tarver, former Oakland Raiders defensive coordinator

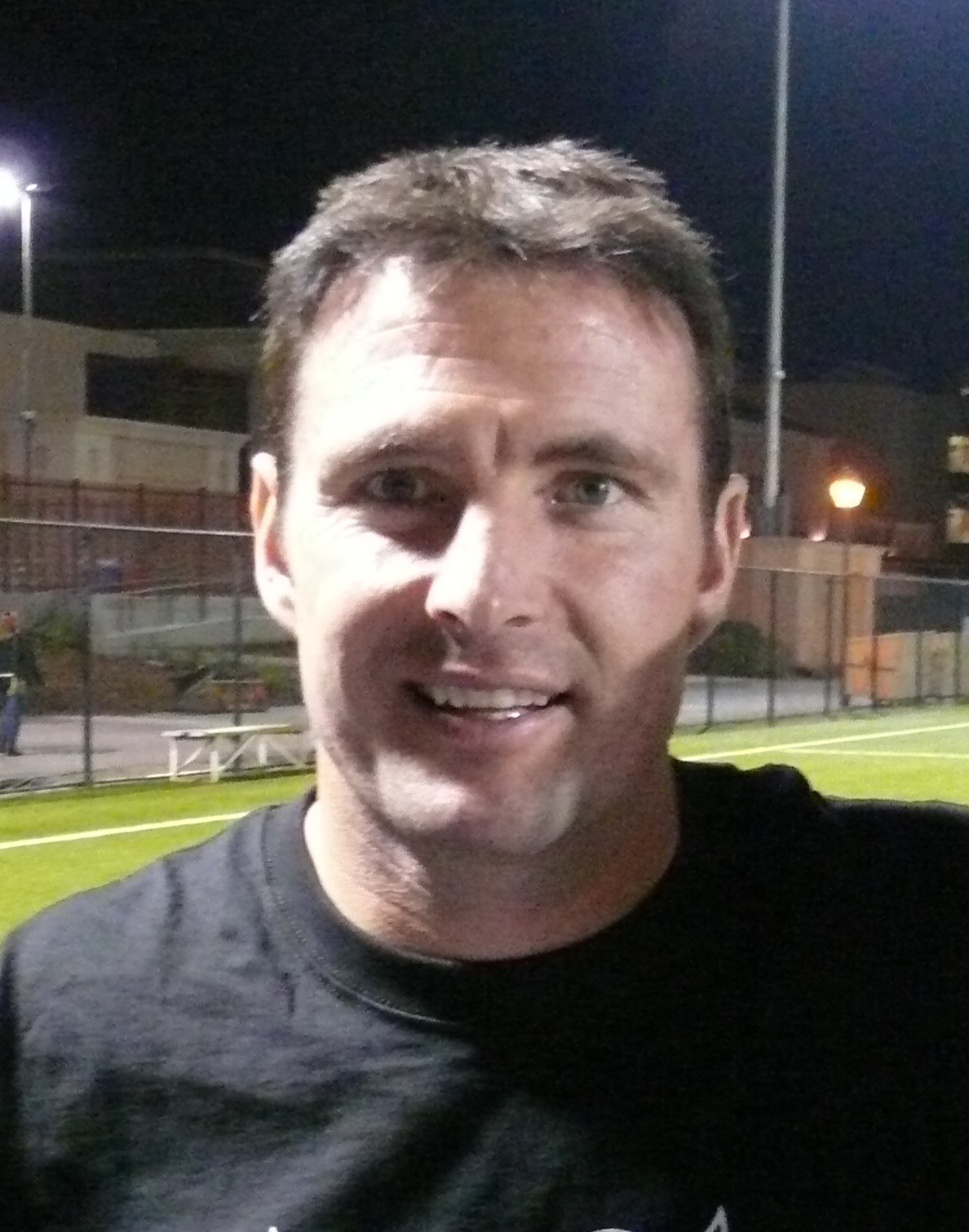
Joe Cannon, professional soccer goalkeeper

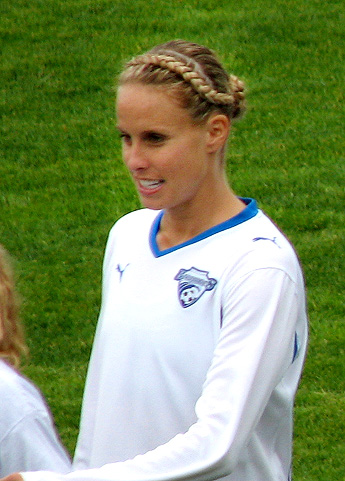
Leslie Osborne, professional soccer player

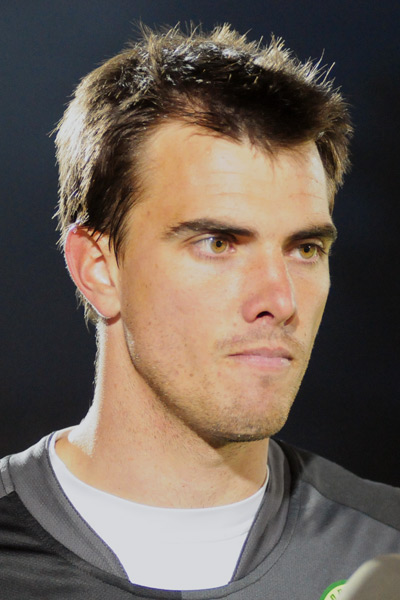
Steve Cronin, professional soccer goalkeeper

=== Soccer ===
- Jordan Angeli, professional soccer player, member of the United States women's national soccer team, and women's professional soccer player for Boston Breakers
- Jalil Anibaba, professional soccer player, former member of the United States Under 20 and United States Under 18 national teams, player for the Houston Dynamo
- Miguel Avila, professional soccer player and referee
- Mehdi Ballouchy, professional soccer player, Major League Soccer player for New York Red Bulls
- Kylie Bivens, professional soccer player, former member of the United States women's national soccer team
- Kiki Bosio, professional soccer player, member of the United States women's national soccer team, and women's professional soccer player for FC Gold Pride
- Paul Bravo, professional soccer player, former member of the United States men's national soccer team, and technical director for the Colorado Rapids
- Joe Cannon, professional soccer player, member of US men's national team, Major League Soccer player for Vancouver Whitecaps FC, two-time MLS Goalkeeper of the Year Award Winner
- Brandi Chastain, professional soccer player, two-time World Cup winner with US women's national team, member of United States women's national soccer team
- Ryan Cochrane, professional soccer player, member of US men's national team, Major League Soccer player for the San Jose Earthquakes
- Steve Cronin, professional soccer player, member of US men's national team, Major League Soccer goalie for the Los Angeles Galaxy and Major League Soccer Cup Champion
- Marian Dalmy, professional soccer player, member of the United States women's national soccer team, and women's professional soccer player for Chicago Red Stars
- Rick Davis, professional soccer player, former captain and member of the United States men's national soccer team and member of the National Soccer Hall of Fame
- Eric Denton, professional soccer player, Major League Soccer player for the Colorado Rapids
- Julie Ertz, United States women's national soccer team, and Chicago Red Stars of the NWSL
- Bianca Henninger, professional soccer player, member of Mexican women's national soccer team
- Sofia Huerta, member of Mexico women's national football team
- Amaechi Igwe, professional soccer player, member of US men's national team, player for the SV Babelsberg 03 in Germany
- Chioma Igwe, professional soccer player, member of United States women's national soccer team, and player for Freiburg in Germany
- Brittany Klein, professional soccer player, member of United States women's national soccer team
- Peter Lowry, professional soccer player, Major League Soccer player for the Chicago Fire
- Meagan McCray, professional soccer player, member of the United States women's national soccer team, and player for Valur of Úrvalsdeild in Iceland
- Leslie Osborne, professional soccer player, member of the United States women's national soccer team, and women's professional soccer player for Boston Breakers
- Amanda Poach, member of United States women's national soccer team
- Cam Rast, former captain of 1989 NCAA championship Broncos soccer team; two-time first team All American, member of 1992 Olympic team, executive member of board of directors of U.S. Soccer Federation, advisor to the U.S. Olympic committee, and head coach of SCU men's soccer team
- Katherine Reynolds, professional soccer player, member of the United States women's national soccer team, and women's professional soccer player for Atlanta Beat
- Jamil Roberts, professional soccer player, member of US men's national team, Major League Soccer player for the San Jose Earthquakes
- Jeff Stewart, professional soccer player, Major League Soccer player for the Colorado Rapids
- Aly Wagner, professional soccer player, Olympic gold medalist (women's soccer), member of United States women's national soccer team and Major League Soccer player for LA Sol
- Jamil Walker, professional soccer player, Major League Soccer player for D.C. United

=== Other athletics ===
- Bill Duffy (1982), president and CEO of BDA Sports Management (sports agent)
- James Fitzpatrick, Olympic gold medalist in rugby in 1920
- Cathy Jamison, Olympic swimmer in 1968
- Caesar Mannelli, Olympic gold medalist in rugby in 1924
- Mary McConneloug, Olympic cyclist, and two-time silver medal winner in Pan American Games cross-country, 2003 Santo Domingo, 2007 Rio de Janeiro
- John Muldoon, Olympic gold medalist in rugby in 1920 and 1924
- John O'Neil, Olympic gold medalist in rugby in 1920 and 1924
- Ron Reis, professional wrestler
- Rudolph Scholz, Olympic gold medalist in rugby 1920 and 1924
- Jim Wiechers, PGA Tour golfer

== Notable faculty ==
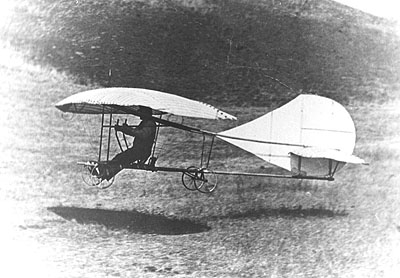
The Montgomery Evergreen glider in flight in 1911

- Maya Ackerman, professor of Computer Science and Engineering
- Joseph Bayma (1816-1892), S.J., philosopher and mathematician
- Catherine Bell (1953–2008), religious studies scholar
- Yaron Brook, president and executive director of the Ayn Rand Institute
- Michael J. Buckley (1931–2019), theologian
- Donald Chisum, legal scholar (patents), author of the iconic Chisum on Patents
- Andre Delbecq (1936–2016), management professor
- Frank Farris, professor of Mathematics and Computer Science
- Fred Foldvary (1946–2021), professor of economics
- Geoff Fox, physics professor, founder of Fox Racing
- David D. Friedman, professor at the Santa Clara University School of Law
- Eric Goldman, legal scholar (technology and law), legal blogger
- Pascale Guiton, microbiologist and founder of the Guiton Lab
- Paul Halmos (1906–2006), mathematician
- Ron Hansen, novelist
- Guadalupe Hayes-Mota, Biotechnologist and Bioethicist
- Teresia Mbari Hinga (1955–2023), professor of religious studies
- Bernard R. Hubbard (1888–1962), S.J., "Glacier Priest", explorer and filmmaker
- Francisco Jiménez, Mexican-American author
- Dale G. Larson, psychologist, professor of Counseling Psychology and Fellow in the American Psychological Association
- Gary Macy, professor of Religious Studies
- John J. Montgomery (1858–1911), aviation pioneer
- Steven Nahmias, professor for the Information Systems & Analytics department
- Francine Patterson, professor of psychology
- Thomas G. Plante, psychologist, commentator on clergy abuse
- Michael A. Santoro, business ethicist and professor in the Department of Management and Entrepreneurship
- Sandra M. Schneiders, professor emerita of New Testament Studies and Christian Spirituality
- George Schoener (1864–1941), botanist
- Hersh Shefrin, scholar, pioneer in behavioral finance theory
- Dragoslav D. Šiljak, professor of electrical engineering
- Nancy C. Unger, author and professor of history
- Shannon Vallor, philosopher of technology
- Sally L. Wood, professor of Electrical and Computer Engineering
