= Patrick Donahoe (disambiguation) =

Patrick Donahoe (1811–1901) was an Irish-American publisher.

Patrick Donahoe may also refer to:

- Patrick R. Donahoe (born 1955), 73rd United States Postmaster General
- Patrick A. Donahoe (1816–1897), 24th President of Santa Clara University
- Patrick J. Donahoe, US Army general
