= Charles Walsh =

Charles or Charlie Walsh may refer to:

- Dylan Walsh (Charles Hunter Walsh, born 1963), American actor
- Charles Francis Walsh (1877–1912), American aviator
- Charles Hamilton Walsh (1820–1874), Australian politician
- Charles J. Walsh (1816–1897), Santa Clara University president
- Charlie Walsh (cyclist), Australian racing cyclist, cycling coach and academic
- Charlie Walsh (footballer) (1910–1954), English footballer
