= Louis Rudolph =

Louis Rudolph may refer to:

- Louis Rudolph, Duke of Brunswick-Lüneburg (1671–1735)
- Louis C. Rudolph (1816–1897), president of Santa Clara University
