= Lawrence A. Fernsworth =

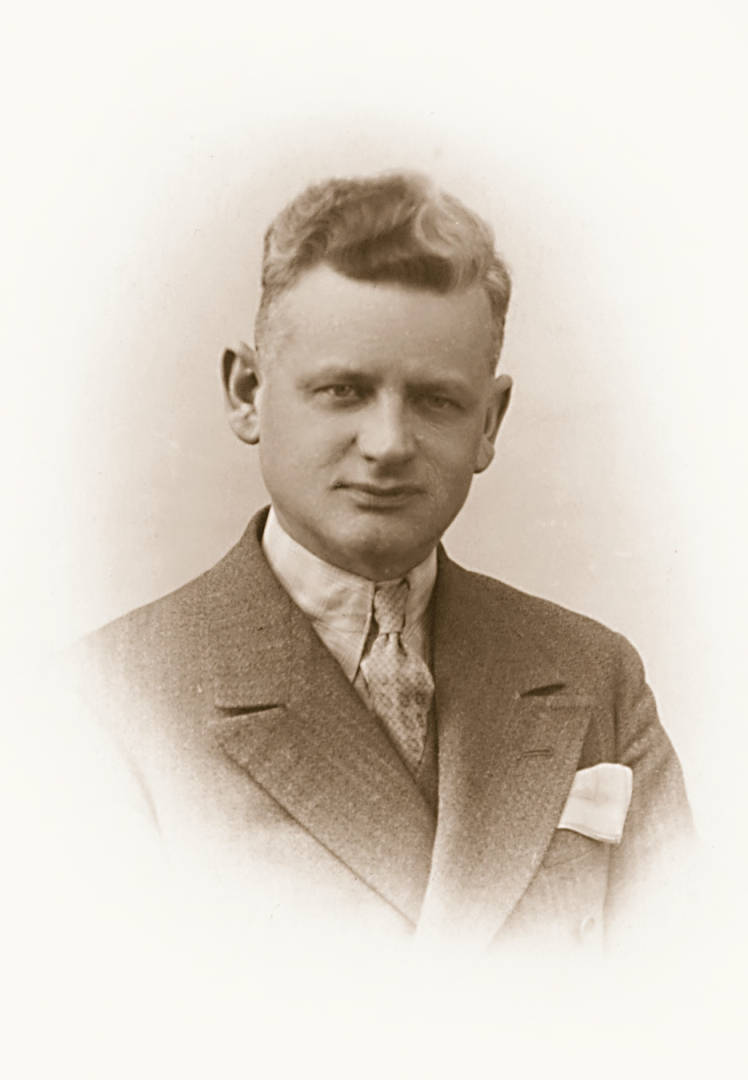
- Died: October 24, 1977; Warner, New Hampshire
- Occupations: Author, journalist, and activist

Lawrence A. Fernsworth was an American author, journalist, and an anti-fascist activist who wrote extensively about the Spanish Civil War. His work included Spain's Struggle for freedom, Dictators and Democrats, Andorra: Mountain Museum of Feudal Europe, Spain's Schedule of War and Next Round in Spain. He gained recognition as a foreign correspondent covering the Spanish Civil War for The Times of London and The New York Times. He also wrote several articles for Foreign Affairs.

== Career ==
Fernsworth was a notable Catholic reporter of the Spanish Civil War, alongside Ernest Hemingway and Taylor of the Chicago Tribune. The American press attempted to suppress Fernsworth's reporting during the Spanish Civil War: "In January 1977, Historia revealed for the first time in Spain what Seldes, Matthews, Hemingway, Fernsworth and others attempted to report in this country [Spain], that 'Nazism and Fascism were accepted and became Franco's policy from the first days of the war. These facts the American press also largely suppressed, preferring to call Hitler’s and Mussolini's collaborator Franco a nationalist,' asserts [George] Seldes."

In the book We Saw Spain Die, Paul Preston mentions Fernsworth. Amanda Hopkinson of The Independent reviewed Preston's book: "Described as a 'Conservative democrat of the old school, who had become a staunch defender of the new Republic', Fernsworth was grey-haired, wore a pince-nez and, a devout Roman Catholic, contributed to the Jesuit weekly America. Yet rather than lurid, unsubstantiated tales of torched churches and raped nuns, he wrote a careful account of the plight of fleeing refugees from Almería for The Times. Despite the provision of sworn statements, The Times refrained from publication in favour of a denial from its correspondent. No act of faith must be allowed to get in the way of the facts – even when Fernsworth knew those facts 'would be harmful to the Republican cause for which ... I felt a deep sympathy. But it was the truth and had to be told'."

Fernsworth attended Santa Clara University in 1908. He was a Neiman Fellow, Class of 1944.

Reporting on a news conference for The Christian Century on November 23, 1954, questioned President Dwight D. Eisenhower:

Mr. President, by request for the Christian Century:

The World Council of Churches at Evanston, recently set forth certain objectives in the international order. The Christian Century asked me to call your attention to several of them briefly:

I. 'That Christians can never accept as the only kind of existence open to them a state of perpetual tension leading to inevitable war.

"It is resolved: We appeal to the statesmen and the leaders of public opinion to refrain from words and actions that are designed to inflame enmity and hatred."

2. --And I will go very briefly--'Reconciliation in a Christian spirit with potential enemy countries and a conviction that it is possible for nations and people to live together in a divided world.' The Council avoided the use of the moot term 'coexistence.'

3. 'An end to a suicidal competition in arms and to a situation which is unfit to be described as peace.'

It asks--I am quoting all along, Mr. President--'Universal enforceable disarmament through the United Nations.'

4. 'Elimination and prohibition of atom and hydrogen bombs and other weapons of mass destruction, and the insistence that nations carry, on tests only within their respective territories or, if elsewhere, only by international clearance and agreement.'

The Christian Century feels that the Christian world is anxious to know the President's views on these questions.

Reporting on a news conference for the Concord Monitor on April 25, 1956, Fernsworth asked President Eisenhower to speak about "charges that a Columbia University professor, Jesus Galindez, was assassinated by agents of the Trujillo dictatorship." President Eisenhower said: "... I will have to find out about that. I don't know a thing about it."

On October 24, 1977, Fernsworth went for a walk in Warner, New Hampshire and did not return. He was approximately 85 years old. Though his family sent a search party, it was not until 1979 that his remains were found and buried.
