= Cornelius J. McCoy =

President of Santa Clara University

Cornelius J. McCoy was Santa Clara University's 18th president, succeeding Zacheus J. Maher.
