= Paul Locatelli =

American Jesuit priest (1938–2010)

27th President of Santa Clara University
- In office 1988–2008
- Preceded by: William J. Rewak, S.J.
- Succeeded by: Michael Engh, S.J.

Personal details
- Born: September 16, 1938 Boulder Creek, California
- Died: July 12, 2010 (aged 71) Los Gatos, California
- Education: Santa Clara University University of Southern California
- Website: www.scu.edu/president

Paul Leo Locatelli, S.J. (September 16, 1938 – July 12, 2010) was an American Jesuit priest, academic and certified public accountant. Locatelli served as the president of Santa Clara University from 1988 until 2008 before becoming chancellor of Santa Clara in 2008. He also held the post of Secretary of Higher Education for the Society of Jesus in Rome.

== Biography ==
=== Early life ===
Locatelli grew up on a ranch in the town of Boulder Creek, California, in the Santa Cruz Mountains, the second of three sons. The family grew their own walnuts and grapes for winemaking. His family had come to Boulder Creek from Italy in the 1890s. His father ran Locatelli Brothers Lumber, where Locatelli worked. His mother's family had emigrated from Italy to Oakland, California, where they opened and operated the Colombo Bakery.

Locatelli was the first member of his family to attend college. He received a bachelor's degree in business at the University of Santa Clara, now Santa Clara University, in 1960. His classmates at Santa Clara included CIA director Leon Panetta, who remained friends with Locatelli, and former Oakland A's owner Stephen Schott. Locatelli obtained a doctorate in business from the University of Southern California's Marshall School of Business.

He enlisted in the United States Army and decided to enter the Jesuits after leaving the armed services. Locatelli entered the former Jesuit School of Theology at Berkeley. He was ordained a Jesuit priest in 1974.

=== Santa Clara University ===
Locatelli began teaching at Santa Clara University as a professor of accounting in 1974, the same year in which he was ordained a Jesuit priest. Within a few years, he was voted outstanding teacher of the year. He rose from Dean of the School of Business, to Academic Vice-President.

Locatelli was named the 27th President of Santa Clara University in 1988 after 14 years at the university. During Locatelli's tenure as president, academics, admissions standards and endowment funding increased substantially.

Under Locatelli's presidency, Santa Clara University fully renovated or constructed nineteen new campus buildings, as well as a sports center. This is the equivalent of two-thirds of all campus facilities. A prolific fundraiser, Locatelli raised millions for the construction spree which included new academic buildings, a business school building, residence halls, a swim center, a tennis center, and the School of Arts and Science. He also raised funds for scholarships at Santa Clara. Locatelli phased out Santa Clara's fraternity and sorority houses, which lessened the influence of the Greek system on student life. Controversially, Locatelli eliminated the school's Division II football program in 1993.

Locatelli spearheaded the effort to reroute The Alameda (California State Route 82), which had previously run through the center of Santa Clara University's campus. Locatelli also had a new entrance road, lined with palm trees, built which leads to the Mission Santa Clara de Asís, a 1777 Spanish mission which is now the centerpiece of Santa Clara's campus.

Locatelli and Santa Clara University became involved with the Salvadoran Civil War during the late 1980s and early 1990s. He offered Santa Clara as a refuge to the lone surviving Jesuit of the 1989 massacre at the Universidad Centroamericana, in which six Jesuits, their housekeeper and her daughter were killed by the Salvadoran Army. (The surviving Jesuit priest had been out of El Salvador at the time of the killings). Father Locatelli also implemented a program where Santa Clara students volunteered and worked at a women's center and urban schools in El Salvador.

Under President Locatelli's guidance, Santa Clara's endowment at Santa Clara grew from $77 million in 1988 to approximately $700 million in 2008.

Through the Ignatian Center for Jesuit Education, the University has expanded its ability to connect students to communities in Silicon Valley and throughout the world. Locatelli was known affectionately by the students at SCU through a variety of nicknames; such as; "Papa Lōc", "Big Poppa P", "P. Loc", and the "Big P".

On March 1, 2008, Locatelli announced his intention to resign during the 2008–09 academic year, after 20 years as university president, due to his additional responsibilities as Secretary of Higher Education of the Society of Jesus in Rome, a post he had held since January 2007, coordinating the Jesuits' 150 universities worldwide, to promote cooperation among Jesuit higher education institutions. He was subsequently promoted to chancellor of the university in November 2008 by new Santa Clara University President Michael Engh, S.J.

=== Recognitions ===
On January 16, 2002, he was awarded the Pro Ecclesia et Pontifice from San Jose Bishop Patrick Joseph McGrath.

Father Locatelli was awarded the Spirit of Silicon Valley Lifetime Achievement Award from the Silicon Valley Leadership Group. He was also a recipient of the David Packard Award in 2009.

=== Death ===
Locatelli was diagnosed with pancreatic cancer in May 2010. At the time Father Locatelli took ill, he was preparing for the fiftieth anniversary celebration and reunion of his classmates in the class of 1960 at Santa Clara University, and had already sent out invitations, including one to Leon Panetta. He was moved to the hospice at Regis Jesuit Infirmary in Los Gatos on July 8, 2010. He died from pancreatic cancer on July 12, 2010, at the age of 71.

Locatelli was survived by his brothers, Albert and Harry. CIA Director, former Congressman and White House Chief of Staff Leon Panetta, a 1960 Santa Clara classmate of Locatelli's, stated after Father Locatelli's death that "What Paul told you was always the truth. He didn't play games. You knew that what he said was what he believed. I don't think there is any question that he will go down as one of the greatest presidents in Santa Clara history."
