= Holly Kearl =

American writer

- Born: Holly Kearl
- Citizenship: American
- Education: Santa Clara University; George Washington University
- Occupation: Author
- Writing career
- Language: English

Holly Kearl is an author who has written three books on street harassment and four national studies on sexual harassment issues. She is the founder of the NGO Stop Street Harassment.

She's also worked for entities like AAUW, UN Women, OpEd Project and the Aspen Institute on programs focused on gender equity and elevating under-represented voices. She received in 2005 a bachelor's degree from Santa Clara University and in 2007 a master's degree from George Washington University.

== Selected publications ==
- Kearl, H. (2010). Stop Street Harassment: Making Public Places Safe and Welcoming for Women. Bloomsbury Academic. ISBN 978-0-313-38496-7. LCCN 2010011872.
- Hill, Catherine; Kearl, H. (2011). Crossing the Line: Sexual Harassment at School (xi+52 pages). AAUW. ISBN 978-1-879922-41-9. LCCN 2011940886.; pdf from aauw.org
- Kearl, H. (2013). 50 Stories about Stopping Street Harassers. 50 Stories about Stopping Street Harassers. ISBN 978-0-615-88083-9.
- Kearl, H. (2015). Stop global street harassment: growing activism around the world. Santa Barbara, California; Denver, Colorado: Praeger, An imprint of ABC-CLIO, LLC. ISBN 978-1-440-84020-3. LCCN 2015015914.
