= Thomas D. Terry =

Thomas D. Terry was Santa Clara University's 25th president, succeeding Patrick A. Donahoe.
