= Irene S. Taylor =

American journalist and public information specialist

Irene Tilka Taylor (née Silverstein May 28, 1902 – September 2, 1989) was a Missouri journalist, a public information specialist for the U.S. Women's Army Corps during World War II, and an intelligence officer after the war in Austria. During her career as a journalist, she reported on many major events such as the 1938 Windsor Wedding, the Spanish Civil War, life as an American Expat, and the evacuation of Americans during the start of World War II in Paris. She worked at a variety of newspapers including the St. Louis Post Dispatch and also was a correspondent for the Chicago Tribune, the New York Herald Tribune, New York Daily News and the United Press International.

== Early life ==
Irene Silverstein was born in St. Joseph, Missouri in September 1902. She was the daughter of William and Bella Stone Silverstein, and the older sister of Harris Silverstein. Harris was two years younger than Irene and was born in 1904. Silverstein grew up in St. Joseph and attended Wyatt Elementary School and later Central High School.

In 1920, Silverstein ran away from home and went to Columbia, Missouri, the home of the University of Missouri. She wanted to go to the university's School of Journalism. Her parents thought that she would never stay, but she graduated in 1924 with a degree in advertising.

== Pre-war journalism career ==
After graduating in 1924, Irene Silverstein moved to East St. Louis, Illinois. She got her first job with the St. Louis Post-Dispatch, and there, was assigned a weekly column. She also worked with the U.S. Junior Chamber of Commerce where she helped to edit their monthly publication that was called, Expansion.

After marrying Edmond Taylor, she and her husband moved to Paris in 1928. She continued working for the St. Louis Post Dispatch and wrote a column about St. Louis natives and their lives as expats in Paris. She also worked for a variety of other newspapers including the Chicago Tribune, New York Herald-Tribune, New York Daily News, and United Press. At these newspapers, she was a stringer, which is a journalist who covers certain events and works for the newspaper on a part-time basis, at their branches in Paris.

=== A career in Paris ===
While in Paris, Silverstein had the opportunity to report on a variety of cultural and social events as well as influential world matters. She covered fashion and attended a fashion show for the first time. The Spanish Civil War took place while she was in Paris. She covered news that came from this war and its implications. Also, as an American living in Paris, with war fast approaching France, she covered the evacuation of American citizens back to the United States. Taylor also worked at CBS as an assistant to Eric Sevareid.

=== Celebrity, fashion, and media coverage ===
In 1938, Silverstein covered the wedding of the Duke and Duchesse of Windsor in 1938. She was the only reporter allowed to enter the room in which they were married. She wrote a variety of articles on the couple, including the discussion of the Duchess' new hair bob, their financial endeavors and their political support while traveling.

Throughout her time in Paris, Silverstein had the opportunity to cover fashion. She attended a variety of fashion shows and viewed different collections. She attended the Vera Borea Summer Collection of 1940, the Paquin Spring Collection of 1940, Bruyère Summer Collection of 1940, and the Molyneux Summer Collection of 1940. In her notes, preserved by the Missouri Historical Society for her article, she describes that, "1940 fashions stress above all courage, calm and stubborn determination that only the French know how to crystallize into productive revenue". Later stating, "the dressmaking industry of this country [France] has charted the course of feminine fashion for the next decade".

=== World and political coverage ===
In 1937, she had the opportunity to cover the confrontation between Leni Riefenstahl and Joseph Goebbels, two influential figures in the Nazi regime, who had ties to Hitler, and were involved in the creation of Nazi propaganda. She explains their relationship and conducted research on their relationship with Hitler and the movie that they created on the Olympic games of 1936.

She also covered the evacuation of Americans from France and other maritime disasters. She wrote one such article entitled "Survivors Crowd U.S. Rescue Ship: 284 Reach Bordeaux; 2 Lost Craft Part of Unconvoyed Fleet of 22". After the ship, the City of Mandalay, carrying passengers from Rangoon to Britain, had sent out an SOS, the Captain F.J. MacKenzie of the ship Independence Hall went out to aid the ship who was hit by a German U46. The ship ended up buckling. Some 284 passengers were saved before its destruction.

In 1940, on her journey back to America, Silverstein stumbled upon an exclusive story. The boat that she was on was being threatened to be shot at with a torpedo by a German U-boat. While everyone on the ship was evacuated onto life rafts, she risked her life to obtain a copy of the messages that were exchanged between the two boats.

=== Transition back to America ===
After evacuating France, Silverstein moved to New York City and worked there for some time. She worked at United Press Radio as the Women's Editor. There, she reported on women's fashions and worked as a feature writer. She was also employed by CBS Radio where was the assistant to Adelaide Hawley.

== Personal and family life ==
After moving to St. Louis and starting her first job, the then Irene Silverstein met Edmond Taylor. He was also a journalist and was working at the St. Louis Globe-Democrat at the time. They married in April 1927. They welcomed their first child, William, in January 1928. Soon afterwards, they moved to Paris, France, after Edmond had accepted a job with the Chicago Tribune. In 1930, the couple welcomed their second child, Caroline, while in France.

Silverstein and her husband divorced in 1936. They remained on good terms. Edmond Taylor went on to publish many books including The Strategy of Terror and The Fall of Dynasties. He worked with the planning board at the Office of Strategic Services in India during World War II. After remarrying Anne Verena de Salis Taylor, he had two more children, and spent the rest of his life in France.

Caroline was diagnosed with leukemia in her childhood and died in 1940, shortly before the Germans invaded France. Irene evacuated from Paris after the Germans invaded. She was on the last boat leaving France for the United States in 1941.

== Military service ==
In 1943, with World War II continuing on, Irene Taylor decided to join the Women's Army Corps. She worked as a public information specialist.

Later on in her service with the Women's Army Corps, she was trained as to perform counter intelligence work. That year, in 1948, she was sent to Austria. In Austria, she continued using her journalistic skills. She was assigned to screen refugees and also help out with the intelligence reports by editing them. In 1952, after 4 years in Austria, Taylor was sent back to the United States. She began working on a history of the Office of Strategic Services. After 3 years, she returned to Austria, and continued screening refugees.

In 1956, after 13 years of being in the service, and reaching the position as major, Taylor retired from the army. Although she was no longer a major, she continued working as an intelligence analyst. Although this time, she worked in Italy. She continued this work until 1960.

In her time in the service, she had the opportunity to meet a variety of important military officials. She met General Dwight D. Eisenhower and General Omar Bradley. She even attended President Eisenhower's inauguration in 1952.

== Late career ==
Irene Taylor then moved to Washington, D.C. Between 1962 and 1967, Taylor was worked for the Bureau of Supplies and Accounts, a department of the U.S. Navy, where she edited Busanda News. At the same time, she was also working with the Department of Health, Education, and Welfare. There, she was the assistant editor for their publication entitled, Aging.

== Last years and death ==
After many years working and traveling, Taylor retired in 1967 to Columbia, Missouri, the city where she had received her bachelor's degree. She hoped to receive her master's degree in Journalism, so, she began taking classes at the University of Missouri-Columbia. Although she did not end up getting her master's degree, she ended up taking classes that interested her.

Irene Taylor, a Mizzou Tigers fan, was the first women to join the Tiger Quarterback Club, in 1972. She consistently had season tickets to the Mizzou Football and Basketball games. Her dedication to the team even led her to follow the team out to the Orange Bowl, in 1969.

She also volunteered at the Harry S. Truman Memorial Veterans' Hospital where she sat at the Information Desk and acted as a greeter. She also edited their publication, the Vet Gazette.

On September 2, 1989, Irene Taylor died.
