= Gina M. Biegel =

American writer and psychotherapist

- Born: Gina M. Biegel
- Citizenship: American
- Education: Santa Clara University
- Occupations: Author, Psychotherapist
- Writing career
- Language: English

Gina M. Biegel is an American author and psychotherapist.

== Biography ==
Gina M. Biegel is a graduate of Santa Clara University. She is the author of The Stress Reduction Workbook for Teens. Biegel is a Licensed Marriage and Family Therapist (LMFT) specializing in mindfulness-based stress reduction. She is also the director of research for Mindful Schools.
