= Miguel Avila =

Colombian-American soccer player and referee

Personal information
- Date of birth: September 11, 1958 (age 68)
- Place of birth: Cartagena, Colombia
- Position: Forward

College career
Years	Team	Apps	(Gls)
1978–1979	Santa Clara Broncos		

Senior career*
Years	Team	Apps	(Gls)
1980–1981	Atlanta Chiefs (indoor)	17	(5)
1981	Carolina Lightnin'	22	(3)
1981–1982	San Jose Earthquakes (indoor)	16	(5)
1982–1983	Carolina Lightnin'		
- * Club domestic league appearances and goals

Miguel Avila is a retired Colombian-American soccer forward who played professionally in the North American Soccer League and American Soccer League.

Avila attended Santa Clara University where he set several men's soccer scoring records. In 1980, he signed with the Atlanta Chiefs of the North American Soccer League. He played only the 1980-1981 NASL indoor season before moving to the San Jose Earthquakes for the 1981-1982 NASL indoor season. He also played for the Carolina Lightnin' of the American Soccer League.

Avila later served as a referee for American Professional Soccer League games.
