= Herman J. Hauck =

Herman J. Hauck was Santa Clara University's 23rd president, succeeding William C. Gianera.

== Sources ==
- California Historical Society Quarterly Coverage: 1922-1970 (Vols. 1-49) JSTOR 25156328
- Gerald McKevitt, S.J. The University of Santa Clara: A History, 1851-1977 (Page 385)
