= Walter F. Thornton =

American Jesuit and university president (died 1933)

Walter F. Thornton, S.J. (died 1933, aged 67) was appointed Santa Clara University's 15th president after the presidency of James P. Morrissey. He held the post from 1913 to 1918.
