= Dale Larson =

Dale G. Larson
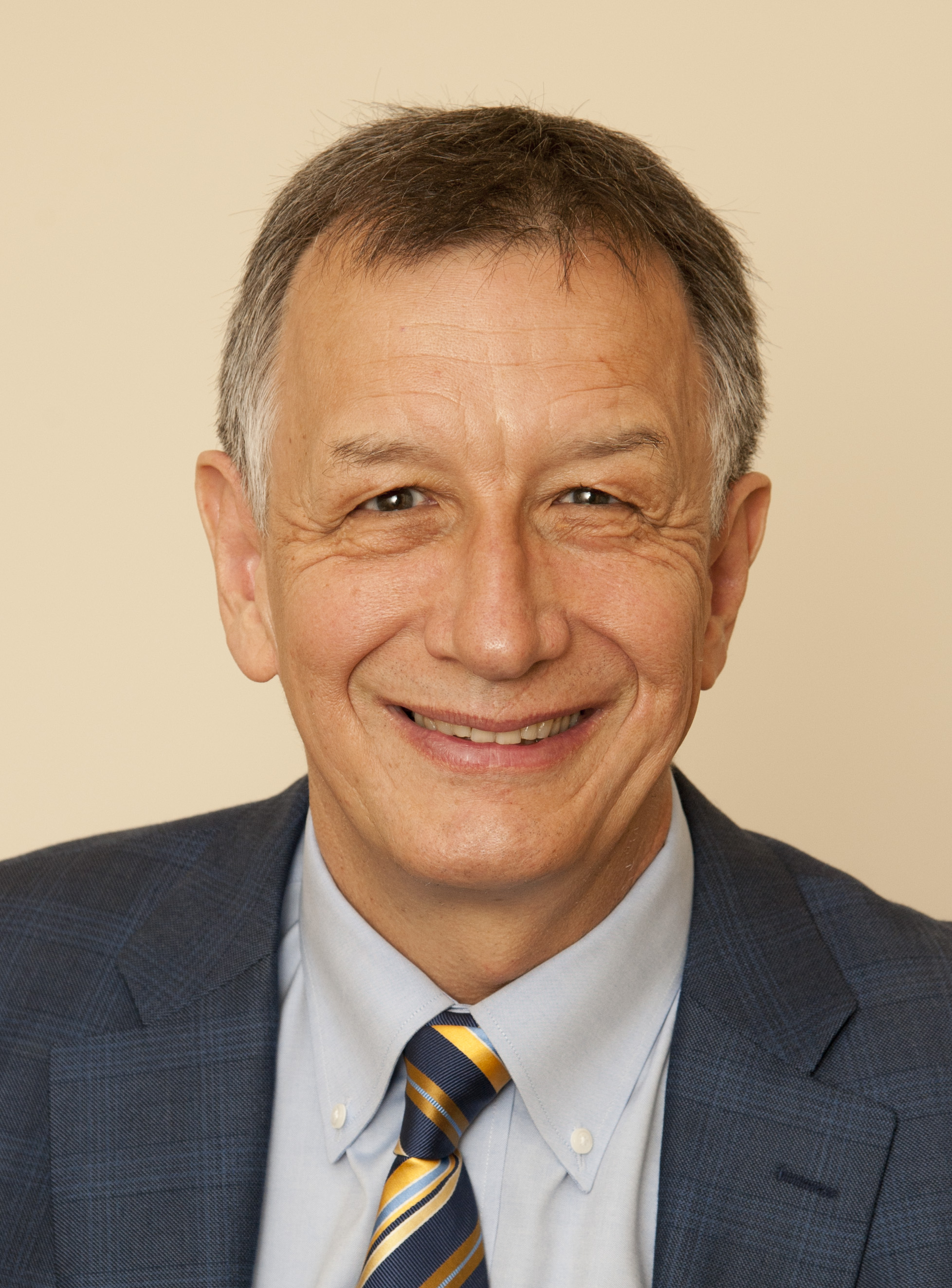
- Education: University of Chicago; University of California, Berkeley
- Scientific career
- Fields: Psychology
- Workplaces: Santa Clara University

Dale G. Larson is an American psychologist who is a professor of Counseling Psychology at Santa Clara University, where he directs graduate studies in health psychology. He is best known for his contributions to the end-of-life field and for his research on self-concealment.

== Education ==
Larson received his B.A. in psychology from the University of Chicago in 1971, and earned a PhD in Clinical Psychology from the University of California, Berkeley, in 1977.

== Work in psychology and end-of-life field ==
Larson's scholarly interests have focused on end-of-life care issues, grief and grief counseling, counseling skills, stress and stress management in the helping professions, and self-concealment. The Self-Concealment Scale he co-authored has now been used in more than 150 empirical studies. His award-winning book, The Helper’s Journey: Working with People Facing Grief, Loss, and Life-Threatening Illness, and his publications on grief counseling, have had significant impact on the field. Other contributions include:

- Senior Editor and contributing author, the Robert Wood Johnson funded national newspaper series, Finding Our Way: Living With Dying in America, which reached 7 million Americans
- Author, the Caring Helper: Skills for Caregiving in Grief and Loss videotape series
- Chairperson, First National Conference on Hospice Volunteerism, National Hospice Organization, San Diego, CA
- Co-director, Berkeley Hospice Training Project, an NIMH- funded national mental health training program for hospice workers

Selected articles and chapters:

- Larson, D. G., Chastain, R. L., Hoyt, W. T., & Ayzenberg, R. (2015). Self-concealment: Integrative review and working model. Journal of Social and Clinical Psychology, 34(8), 705–729.
- Larson, D. G. (2013). A person-centred approach to grief counselling. In M. Cooper, M. OHara, P. F. Schmid, & A. Bohart (Eds.), The handbook of person-centred psychotherapy and counselling (2nd ed., pp. 313–326). New York: Palgrave Macmillan.
- Larson, D. G., & Hoyt, W. T. (2007). What has become of grief counseling: An evaluation of the empirical foundations of the new pessimism. Professional Psychology: Research and Practice, 38, 347–355.
- Larson, D. G., & Bush, N.J. (2006). Stress management for oncology nurses: Finding a healing balance. In R.M. Carroll-Johnson, L.M. Gorman, & N.J. Bush (Eds.), Psychosocial nursing care along the cancer continuum (2nd ed.) (pp. 587–601). Pittsburgh, PA: Oncology Nursing Society.
- Larson, D. G., & Tobin, D. R. (2000). End-of-life conversations: Evolving practice and theory. JAMA, 284, 1573–1578.
- Larson, D. G., & Chastain, R. L. (1990). Self-concealment: Conceptualization, measurement, and health implications. Journal of Social and Clinical Psychology, 9, 439–455.

== Awards and memberships ==
- Death Educator Award, Association for Death Education and Counseling, 2016
- Fellow, Division 32, Humanistic Psychology, 2016
- Fellow, Division 38, Health Psychology, 2009
- Fellow, Division 17, Counseling Psychology, 2008
- Member, International Work Group on Death, Dying and Bereavement
- The Helper's Journey: Working With People Facing Grief, Loss, and Life-Threatening Illness cited as a 1993 Book of the Year by the American Journal of Nursing
- Kara Pioneer Award (“In recognition of pioneering work in end-of-life care”), 2007
- Award of Excellence for Educational Achievement, National Hospice Organization, 1997
- Summer Scholar, Stanford Center for Advanced Study in the Behavioral Sciences, 1988
