= Michael A. Santoro =

Professor and business ethicist

Michael Santoro
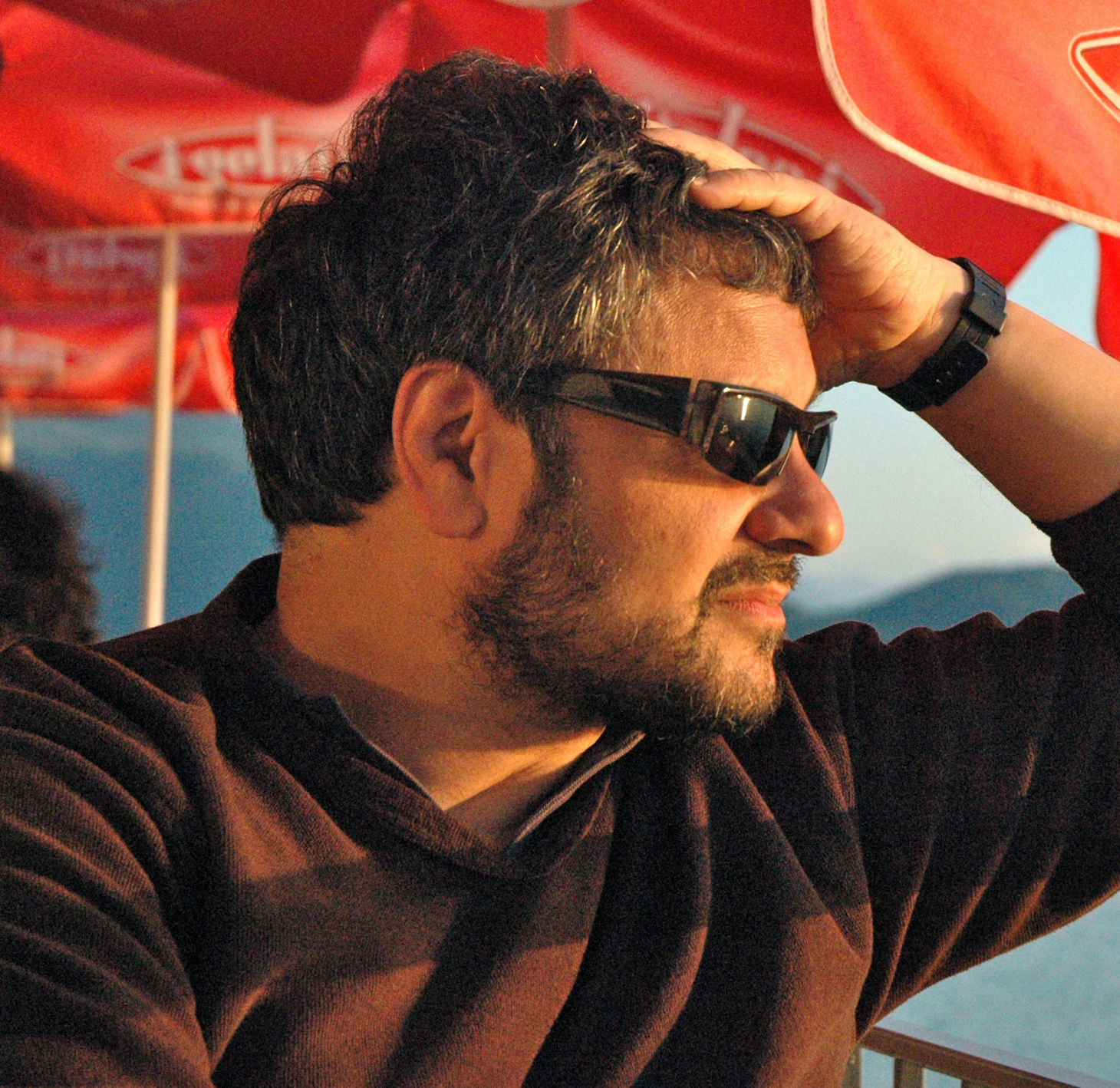
- Born: Montreal, Quebec, Canada
- Education: Harvard University (Ph.D.); New York University (J.D.); Oberlin College (A.B.)
- Occupations: Professor; Ethicist
- Spouse: Robyn Burch
- Website: www.michaelasantoro.com

Michael Anthony Santoro is a business ethicist and professor in the Department of Management and Entrepreneurship at the Leavey School of Business, Santa Clara University. He has been recognized for his interdisciplinary work in business ethics, technology ethics, and public policy.

He has served as an expert witness in corporate governance cases over the past two decades, including the Merck VIOXX litigation, which was described by the New York Times as a potentially significant event in corporate governance.

Santoro has written and offered public comments on business and human rights, corporate social responsibility and human rights in China, pharmaceutical industry ethics, and Wall Street ethics and the ethics of Artificial Intelligence.

== Early life and education ==
Santoro was born on December 10, 1954, in Montreal, Quebec, Canada. Santoro graduated from Xaverian High School in Brooklyn, NY. He received his Ph.D. degree from Harvard University, his J.D. from New York University, and his A.B. from Oberlin College. He was a Fulbright Fellow at the University of Hong Kong.

== Career ==
He began his career at large law firms before serving as General Counsel for one of the first publicly held biotechnology companies in Cambridge, Massachusetts. Prior to joining Santa Clara University, Santoro was a tenured faculty member at Rutgers University. He has also held visiting positions at the University of Notre Dame, Zurich University, and the Shanghai Advanced Institute of Finance at Shanghai Jiao Tong University.

In April, 2025 it was announced that Santoro has joined Rottenberg Lipman Rich, P.C. as Of Counsel to establish a specialized Artificial Intelligence Practice Area.

=== Business and human rights ===
Santoro was Co-Editor-In-Chief of the Business and Human Rights Journal published by Cambridge University Press. He is also a member of the editorial boards of the Journal of Human Rights and Business Ethics Quarterly.

=== China, human rights, and Western business ===
==== "Fair Share" Theory of Business Responsibility for Human Rights ====
Santoro's first book Profits and Principles: Global Capitalism and Human Rights in China (Cornell University Press, 2000) outlines a "fair share" theory of business responsibility for human rights. Reviewer Lucien Pye wrote in Foreign Affairs that "this timely study, which combines sharp moral reasoning, spells out what can and cannot be expected --and what American multinational corporations should and should not be doing in China." The New York Times Book Review said Santoro's "solidly grounded analysis deserves a wide audience."

==== Testimony Before the United States Senate Finance Committee ====
On March 23, 2000, Michael Santoro testified before the United States Finance Committee in favor of China's accession into the WTO. Based on his research in Profits and Principles, Santoro argued at the time that, rather than continuing to threaten trade sanctions, granting Permanent Normal Trade Relations (PNTR) to China was the best strategy for Western nations to promote human rights in China. In his testimony, Santoro introduced the concept of positive "human rights spinoff" into the PNTR debate. To succeed in China, Santoro argued, "companies must employ state--of-the-art technology and management practices. In doing things that a company must do to build market share, multinational corporations are transmitting values and practices to their employees that have tremendous significance for democracy and human rights."

==== China 2020 ====
In China 2020: How Western Business Can--and Should--Influence Social and Political Change in the Coming Decade (Cornell University Press, 2009), Santoro presents a more sanguine view of the human rights impacts of foreign business, observing that foreign companies operating in China had fallen into a "complacent partnership" with the Chinese government that was blunting the potential positive human rights impacts of foreign business and private enterprise in China. Santoro argues that "foreign investment in China will never be secure unless it is embedded in a society where rights, including economic rights, are respected...and where a strong and independent rule of law protects the rights and economic interests of its citizens," calling it "unacceptable that no major business has initiated a court action against any level of Chinese government for anything."

=== Pharmaceutical industry ethics ===
In 2005 Santoro and Johnson & Johnson executive Thomas M. Gorrie published a co-edited volume Ethics and The Pharmaceutical Industry (Cambridge University Press, 2005).

In 2009, Michael Santoro was hired in the settlement of a shareholder derivative lawsuit against the drug company Merck during the Vioxx controversy to help draft corporate governance reforms that presiding judge Carol E. Higbee said would "be helpful to the shareholders because they will prevent potential future liability from the sale of potentially dangerous drugs."

During the health concern scare over Yaz and Yasmin, Santoro told the NY Times that pharmaceutical companies should "set higher standards for themselves than those set by the F.D.A.". When de-regulation of consumer safeguards in the pharmaceutical industry was proposed in early 2017 by the Trump administration, Santoro argued against the ability of companies to market off-label drugs directly to the public, saying, "Drug companies have a very bad history of promoting products for which they haven't been approved. The industry hasn't displayed trustworthiness as far as this goes."

=== Wall Street ethics and the financial crisis ===
In 2013, Santoro and his co-author Ronald J. Strauss published Wall Street Values : Business Ethics and the Global Financial Crisis (Cambridge University Press, 2013). Santoro and Strauss argue that Wall Street's "ethical problems came when proprietary trading began to overshadow customer services."

During the 2013 Bloomberg customer privacy scandal where its journalists were provided access to private company information through its network terminals, Santoro made reference to the conflict of interests on Wall Street and deemed it "a major breach of customer trust." In 2016, Santoro claimed that the Federal Reserve has become politicized and that "in the last financial crisis we had to worry about the impact of on government from the bursting of the business bubble. In the next crisis we will have to worry about the impact on business from the bursting of the government debt bubble".

=== Artificial Intelligence and Ethics ===
Santoro’s research spans business ethics, artificial intelligence, and healthcare disparities. He has been instrumental in addressing racial bias in medical appointment scheduling through machine learning.

The study Overbooked and Overlooked: Machine Learning and Racial Bias in Medical Appointment Scheduling was conducted alongside Michele Samorani and Haibing Lu of Santa Clara University, Shannon Harris of Virginia Commonwealth University, and Linda Goler Blount of the Black Women's Health Imperative.

Santoro’s work has received the M&SOM Best Paper Award 2023.

== Awards and recognition ==
- M&SOM Best Paper Award 2023 for research on racial bias in healthcare scheduling systems.
- INFORMS Minority Issues Forum Award 2021.

== Publications ==
=== Books ===
Santoro's published books include:

- Santoro, Michael A. (2000). Profits and Principles: Global Capitalism and Human Rights in China. Cornell University Press. ISBN 0801435013.
- Gorrie, Thomas M.; Santoro, Michael A., eds. (2005). Ethics and the Pharmaceutical Industry (PDF). Cambridge University Press. ISBN 9780511610769.
- Santoro, Michael A. (2009). China 2020: How Western Business Can–and Should–Influence Social and Political Change in the Coming Decade. Cornell University Press. ISBN 978-0801446955.
- Santoro, Michael A.; Strauss, Ronald J. (2013). Wall Street Values: Business Ethics and the Global Financial Crisis. Cambridge University Press. ISBN 9781107017351.

== Personal life ==
Santoro is married to Robyn Burch, a registered nurse. They have two sons.
