= Sally L. Wood =

Engineer

Doctor Sally L. Wood
- Occupation: Thomas J. Bannan Professor of Electrical Engineering
- Title: IEEE Fellow
- Awards: IEEE Distinguised Lecturer (2003) ASSE Electrical and Computer Engineering Division Distinguished Educator Award (2009) Brutocao Family Foundation Award for Curriculum Innovation, Santa Clara University (2014)

Academic background
- Education: Columbia University
- Alma mater: Stanford University

Academic work
- Discipline: Electrical Engineering
- Institutions: Santa Clara University

Sally L. Wood is an engineer at Santa Clara University. She is a fellow of the Institute of Electrical and Electronics Engineers. Her research focuses on image and signal processing, computational imaging and super-resolution, medical imaging applications, and engineering education.

== Education ==
She received her Ph.D. at Stanford University in 1978, her M.S. from Stanford University in 1975, and her B.S. from Columbia University in 1969. She has taught courses in Digital Signal Processing, Image Processing, Computer Vision and Logic Design.

== Awards and honors ==
Fellow of IEEE. She was given the IEEE Distinguished lecturer award in 2003. She also earned in 2009 the ASEE Electrical and Computer Engineering Division Distinguished Educator Award. In 2014, she was awarded by Santa Clara University, the Brutocao Family Foundation Award for Curriculum Innovation.
