= Eugene M. Premo =

American judge (1936–2021)

Justice of the California Courts of Appeal, Sixth District
- In office December 24, 1985 – May 3, 1994

Personal details
- Born: Eugene Milton Premo; August 28, 1936 San Jose, California, U.S.
- Died: January 25, 2021 (aged 84) Saratoga, California, U.S.
- Education: Santa Clara University

Eugene Milton Premo (August 28, 1936 – January 25, 2021) was an American justice of the California Courts of Appeal, Sixth District. He graduated from Santa Clara University in 1957. In 1962, Justice Premo graduated with a LL.B. Degree from Santa Clara University School of Law. In 1988 he was appointed to a newly created position on the court of Appeal, Sixth District by Governor George Deukmejian. He has also served as president of the Municipal Court Judges Association.

In 1975, Justice Premo, while a judge of the Superior Court of Santa Clara County, dismissed a charge made against a woman under the 1945 California Wife-Abuse Law. The statute stated, "Any husband who willfully inflicts upon his wife corporal injury resulting in a traumatic condition, and any person who willfully inflicts upon any child any cruel and inhumane corporal punishment of injury resulting in a traumatic condition, is guilty of a felony, and upon conviction there-of shall be punished by imprisonment in the state prison for not more than 10 years or in the county jail for not more than one year.” Premo noted in a memorandum that dismissing the case was based on the conviction being a felony for the husband, while "a wife, however, inflicting the same injury and trauma can be subjected to no more than misdemeanor prosecution under assault and battery sections."

Premo died on January 25, 2021, at the age of 84.
