= Jack Kuehler =

American engineer and businessman

Jack D. Kuehler (August 29, 1932 – December 20, 2008) was an American electrical engineer who devoted the majority of his career at IBM, where he was the firm's highest ranking technologist, serving as president and later vice chairman of the company.

Kuehler was born in Grand Island, Nebraska in 1932. He studied mechanical engineering at Santa Clara University and later earned a master's degree in electrical engineering from the school.

Kuehler started at IBM in 1958 as an associate engineer working at the company's San Jose Research Laboratory in 1958. After advancing through various technical and managerial positions, he was appointed as director of the Raleigh Communications Laboratory in Research Triangle Park, North Carolina in 1968, and as named as director of the San Jose and Menlo Park development laboratories in 1970.

He was chosen to serve as senior vice president in May 1982, and was appointed as vice chairman of the board and a member of the executive committee in January 1988 with responsibility for corporate manufacturing and systems and programming staffs.

In May 1989, Kuehler became IBM president when John Fellows Akers relinquished that title; Akers continued to serve as chairman and CEO of IBM. Kuehler's promotion was unusual since most IBM presidents came from sales instead of engineering, and being two years older than Akers he was unlikely to succeed him as CEO, therefore the title was seen as an acknowledgement of Kuehler's long service to the company as there were no reporting changes.

Kuehler played a key role in IBM's investment in Intel, aimed at helping that company survive against Japanese competitors and then later formed a partnership with Hitachi a company that had been one of IBM's fiercest competitors. He also played a key role in the formation of Sematech in 1987, an industry-wide initiative sponsored by the United States government aimed at revitalizing the American semiconductor chip industry.

Shifting IBM from its longstanding reliance on the mainframe computer, Kuehler dealt with the rise of the microprocessor-based personal computer, through IBM's development of the IBM Personal Computer based on an open standard that relied on Intel processors and operating system software from Microsoft.

Kuehler helped create a partnership between IBM, Apple Inc., and Motorola that became known as the AIM alliance to challenge the dominating positions that Microsoft and Intel had in the personal computing business. Kuehler sought to expand the demand for its Reduced instruction set computer architecture, which was designed to achieve higher performance by running a smaller set of commands. Kuehler called Michael Spindler, president of Apple Computer, who bought into the approach for a design that could challenge the Wintel-based PC. By combining the advantages of IBM's hardware expertise and Apple's software advances, the goal was to create a competitor for the desktop market. This partnership created the PowerPC microprocessor that powered Apple's computers from 1994 to 2006.

Kuehler was a trustee of Santa Clara University and donated $1 million to the college's engineering school in 2005.

Kuehler died at age 76 on December 20, 2008 in Rancho Santa Fe, California of complications related to Parkinson's disease.

== Sources ==
- Tributes
