= William C. Gianera =

William C. Gianera (February 12 1890-July 6 1976) was Santa Clara University's 22nd president, succeeding Charles J. Walsh.
