= Timothy L. Murphy =

Timothy L. Murphy, S.J. (1880–1929) was appointed Santa Clara University's 16th president after the presidency of Walter F. Thornton.

== Works ==
- Discovery of America by the Irish Previous to the Ninth Century: With Accounts by Scandinavians and Germans of “Irland It Mikla” and “Vinland Dat Gode.” (1889)
