= Robert Kinerk =

American writer

- Born: Robert Kinerk
- Citizenship: American
- Education: Santa Clara University
- Occupation: Author
- Writing career
- Language: English

Robert Kinerk is an author who is best known for his children's books. Kinerk has written Clorinda, Clorinda Takes Flight, Bear's First Christmas, and Oh, How Sylvester Can Pester!. He is a graduate of Santa Clara University and the University of Notre Dame. Before he became an author, he was a journalist and playwright.
