= Sherrie Gong Taguchi =

- Born: Sherrie Gong Taguchi
- Citizenship: American
- Education: Stanford University; Santa Clara University
- Occupation: Author
- Writing career
- Language: English

Sherrie Gong Taguchi is an author who is best known for her books on career development. She is a graduate of Stanford University and Santa Clara University. She has served eight years as director of Stanford Graduate School of Business MBA Career Management Program. She left Stanford to move to London, England, where she began her writing and consulting.

== Selected works ==
- Hiring the Best and the Brightest: Recruiting, Developing, and Inspiring Top Talent, Atlanta : AMACOM, 2002 (Held in 996 libraries according to WorldCat)
- The Ultimate Guide to Getting the Career You Want, New York : McGraw-Hill, 2004 (Held in 979 libraries according to WorldCat)
  - Chinese translation: 功成名就的第一本書 : 成功發展並管理個人事業的10大黃金法則 / Gong cheng ming jiu de di yi ben shu : cheng gong fa zhan bing guan li ge ren shi ye de 10 da huang jin fa ze
- The Career Troubleshooter.New York : AMACOM, 2006
