= Zacheus J. Maher =

The Reverend Zacheus J. Maher SJ
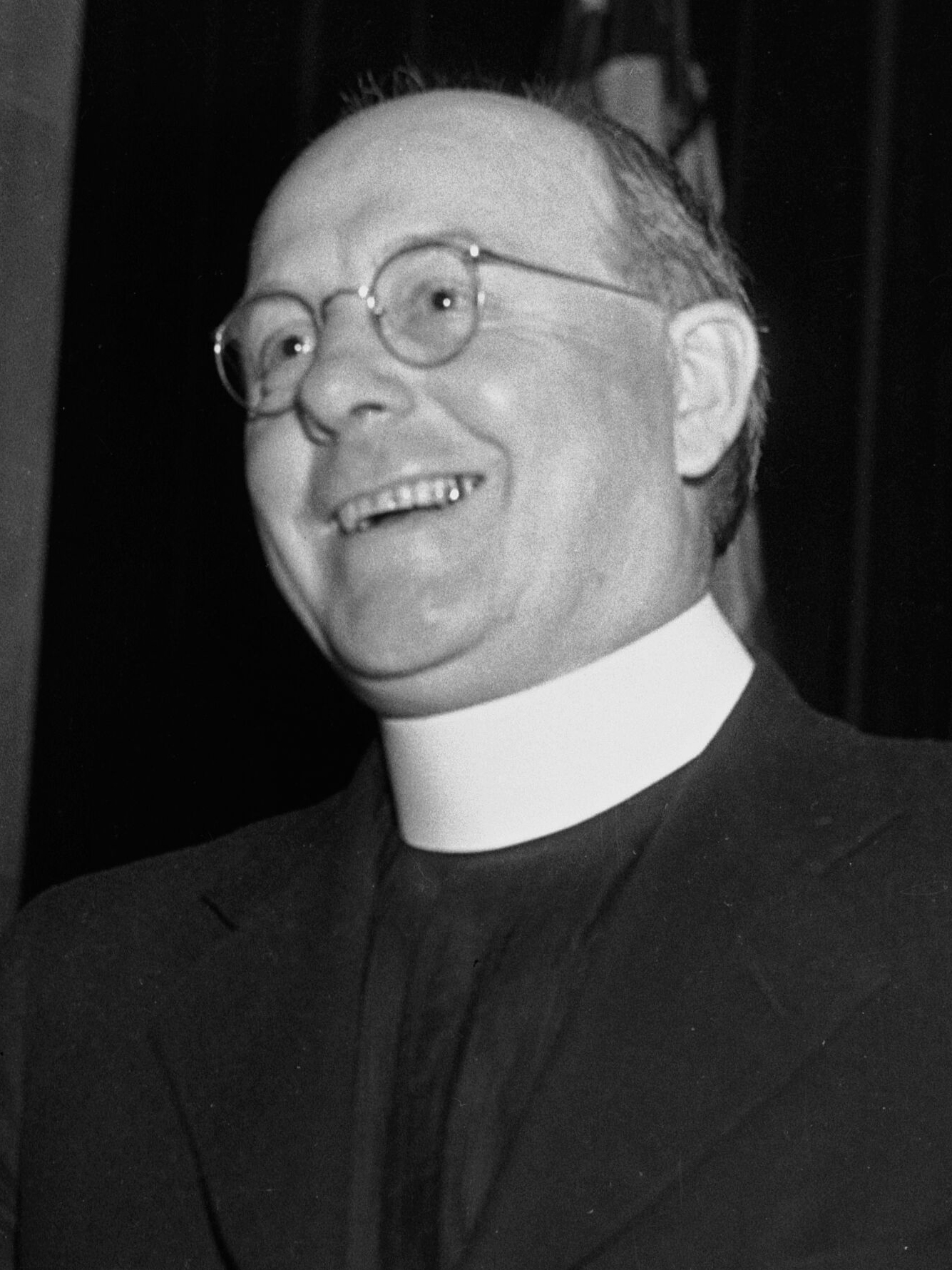
- Maher in 1935

6th President of Loyola Marymount University
- In office 1930–1932
- Preceded by: Joseph A. Sullivan
- Succeeded by: Hugh C. Duce

Personal details
- Born: October 7, 1882 San Francisco, California
- Died: October 1, 1963 (aged 80) San Francisco, California
- Profession: Jesuit priest, professor, administrator

Zacheus J. Maher (October 7, 1882 – October 1, 1963) was 17th president of Santa Clara University, Santa Clara, California, United States from 1921 to 1926, after the presidency of Timothy L. Murphy and the 6th president of Loyola Marymount University, Los Angeles, California from 1930 to 1932. After his tenure at Santa Clara and Loyola, he moved to the Vatican and became the assistant for North America to Wlodimir Ledóchowski, 26th Superior General of the Society of Jesus.

== See also ==
- Presidents of Loyola Marymount University

Academic offices
Preceded by Joseph A. Sullivan	Presidents of Loyola Marymount University; 1930–1932	Succeeded by Hugh C. Duce
