= Bill Duffy (basketball) =

American basketball player and agent

Personal information
- Listed height: 6 ft 4 in (1.93 m)

Career information
- College: Santa Clara University
- NBA draft: 1982: 5th round, 4th overall pick
- Drafted by: Denver Nuggets
- Stats at Basketball Reference

Bill Duffy is a retired professional basketball player and agent specializing in the representation of professional basketball players in the National Basketball Association.

== Career ==
=== Basketball ===
Duffy is a former basketball player, and played basketball at University of Minnesota and was later transferred to Santa Clara University. He was selected by the Denver Nuggets in the fifth round of the 1982 NBA draft (the team's fourth pick that year).

=== Sports management ===
In 1985 Duffy's childhood friend, San Francisco 49ers legend Ronnie Lott helped him sign his first client, Cleveland Browns receiver Webster Slaughter. Duffy founded Walnut Creek based BDA Sports Management. Later he founded BDA Sports International together with Rade Filipovich. BDA represents stars such as Yao Ming, Steve Nash, Joakim Noah, Rajon Rondo, Luka Dončić.

== Personal life ==
Duffy lives in the Bay Area, in Northern California with his wife and five children. He is Catholic.
