= Manuel Valencia (painter) =

American painter

- Born: c. 1856; San Rafael, California, U.S.
- Died: July 6, 1935; Sacramento, California, U.S.
- Occupation: Painter
- Children: 6 sons, 3 daughters

Manuel Valencia (c. 1856 – July 6, 1935) was an American painter, and the namesake of Valencia Street in San Francisco, California.

== Life ==
Valencia was born circa 1856 in San Rafael, California. He was trained by Julius Tararnier.

Valencia became a painter in San Francisco, California, where Valencia Street was named in his honor. His painting of Sutter's Fort was hung in the California room of the California State Library. Another painting was acquired by Ida Saxton McKinley, the First Lady of the United States from 1897 to 1901.

Valencia had six sons and three daughters. He died on July 6, 1935, in Sacramento, California.
