= William J. Rewak =

William J. Rewak is Santa Clara University's 26th president, succeeding Thomas D. Terry.
