= Anthony Quartuccio =

American music director and conductor

Anthony Quartuccio is an American music director and conductor.

== Career ==
Quartuccio has conducted both concert halls and Operas. He has made appearances around the country and in Asia and the Czech Republic. Quartuccio received a Bachelor of Music Degree from Santa Clara University. In 2006 he received a lifetime achievement award in the Arts from the Italian American Heritage Foundation.

== Personal life ==
Quartuccio's father, Anthony Quartuccio, Sr. (November 1922 - October 16, 2011) was a locally renowned author and illustrator in Northern California.
