= Arturo Jaramillo =

American lawyer

Head of Regulation and Licensing Department

Personal details
- Education: Santa Clara University

Arturo Jaramillo is the Head of Regulation and Licensing Department in New Mexico. He also served as president of the New Mexico State Bar Association.
