= Michael Engh =

American historian (born 1949)

28th President of Santa Clara University
- In office January 5, 2009 – June 30, 2019
- Preceded by: Paul Locatelli, S.J.
- Succeeded by: Kevin F. O'Brien

Personal details
- Born: Michael Eric Engh; December 14, 1949 (age 76) Los Angeles, California, U.S.
- Profession: Jesuit priest, historian

Michael Eric Engh (born December 14, 1949) is an American Jesuit priest, academic and historian. He was the 28th President of Santa Clara University in Santa Clara, California from January 5, 2009, to June 30, 2019.

== Biography ==
Engh is a third generation Californian. He is a historian specializing in the history of California and the American West and previously was a professor of history at Loyola Marymount University in Los Angeles. He was also the dean of Loyola Marymount's Bellarmine College of Liberal Arts before becoming president of Santa Clara University.

== President of Santa Clara University ==
Engh was appointed president of Santa Clara University in 2008, succeeding Father Paul Locatelli, who had been president from 1988 until 2008.

Engh officially became the 28th President of Santa Clara University on January 5, 2009. His inauguration was held on April 24, 2009, at Santa Clara's Leavey Event Center. The ceremony was attended by approximately 1,500 guests, including the leaders or representatives of more than 100 universities and colleges. He was re-elected to a six-year term in November 2013, a post he held until June 30, 2019. Kevin O'Brien, S.J., the 29th President of Santa Clara, succeeded him on July 1, 2019.

In October 2013, Engh made the decision to drop health insurance coverage of elective abortions for the Catholic university's faculty and staff. He wrote a letter to the university's faculty and staff stating that he and the university "studied how the school can structure its medical insurance plans in 2014 to be compliant with federal and California laws and regulations while representing its values as a Jesuit university". Neither the Affordable Care Act or California law mandate employers to cover elective abortions. The faculty senate of the university took a vote and declared Engh's resolution invalid, but the final decision rests with the board of trustees of the school.

The decision to drop coverage for abortions violated the California constitution and was overturned by the state of California's Department of Managed Health Care in 2014.

== Works authored ==
Engh has written on the role of the Catholic Church in the settlement of colonial California by the Spanish. He has also authored works on the history of Los Angeles. One of his best known works is Frontier Faiths: Church, Temple, and Synagogue in Los Angeles, published in 1992.
