= Eileen Kato =

American lawyer

Member of the American Bar Association's Justice Kennedy Commission on Sentencing
- Incumbent
- Assumed office 2017

Judge for the King County District Court of Washington
- In office June 1994 – March 2016

Personal details
- Born: September 5, 1950 (age 75) Ogden, Utah, U.S.
- Education: San Jose State University (BS, MBA); Santa Clara University (JD)

Eileen A. Kato (born September 5, 1950) is an American lawyer, retired judge, and member of the American Bar Association's Justice Kennedy Commission on Sentencing, and past chair of the American Bar Association's Conference on Specialized Court Judges.

== Education ==
She graduated from San Jose State University in 1976 with a Bachelor of Science and in 1977 with a Master of Business Administration. She graduated in 1980 with a Juris Doctor from Santa Clara University School of Law.

== Legal career ==
She has worked as a special assistant to the U.S. Attorney for the Western Washington District, and as a senior trial attorney with the Department of the Treasury. She practiced as an attorney in two private firms before joining the bench in King County, Washington, in 1994.

== Judicial career ==
From 1994 to 2016, she served as a Judge for the King County District Court of Washington. She retired in 2016.

== Post-retirement ==
Since 2017, she has served as a member of the American Bar Association's Justice Kennedy Commission on Sentencing.
