= James P. Morrissey =

James P. Morrissey, S.J. was appointed Santa Clara University's 14th president after the presidency of Richard A. Gleeson.
