= Charles J. Walsh =

President of Santa Clara University

Charles J. Walsh was Santa Clara University's 21st president, succeeding Louis C. Rudolph.
