= Patrick A. Donahoe =

24th president of Santa Clara University

Patrick A. Donahoe was Santa Clara University's 24th president, Herman J. Hauck. A building is named in his honor.
