= Richard A. Gleeson =

Richard A. Gleeson SJ (December 24, 1861 – December 23, 1945) was an American Jesuit priest and academic administrator, the president of Santa Clara University and Loyola Marymount University.

== Life ==
Gleeson was originally from Philadelphia, where he was born on December 24, 1861. He studied at Saint Joseph's College there, but by 1877 he had traveled to Santa Clara, California, and joined the Jesuits there. After several assignments and more study, he was ordained in 1894. He continued to teach there until 1899, when he became the pastor of the Cathedral Basilica of St. Joseph (San Jose). He was appointed 13th president of Santa Clara University, Santa Clara, California, USA, (1905–10) after the presidency of Robert E. Kenna. From 1911 to 1914 he headed the newly founded Loyola Marymount University in Southern California, becoming its first president.

He was named provincial superior for California, from 1914 to 1918. After this, he spent the rest of his life working at the University of San Francisco. He died on December 23, 1945.

== Legacy ==
In December 1950 the University of San Francisco's Gleeson Library was dedicated and named for him.
