= Louis C. Rudolph =

President of Santa Clara University

Louis C. Rudolph was the 20th president of Santa Clara University, succeeding James J. Lyons.
