= University of San Francisco School of Law =

Private law school in San Francisco, California, US

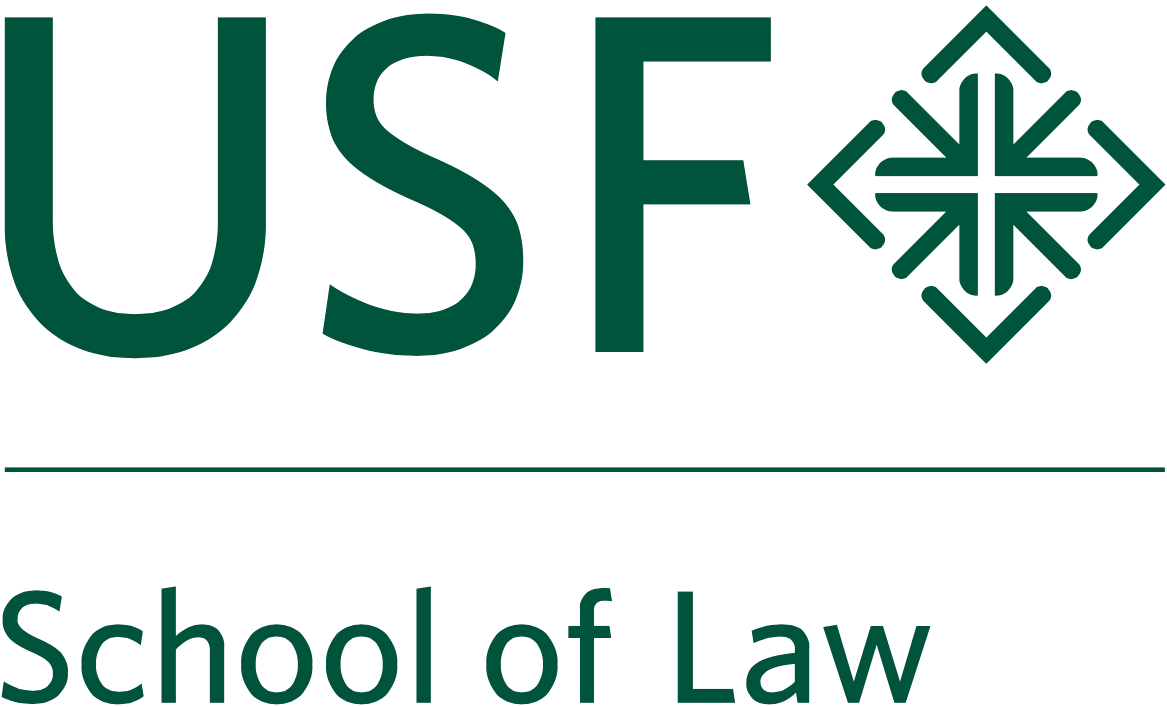
- Motto: Change the World From Here
- Parent school: University of San Francisco
- Religious affiliation: Catholic Church (Jesuit)
- Established: 1912
- School type: Private law school
- Dean: Johanna Kalb
- Location: San Francisco, California, U.S. 37°46′29″N 122°27′9″W
- Enrollment: 367
- Faculty: 76 (37 full-time)
- USNWR ranking: 156th (tie) (2026)
- Bar pass rate: 85.5% (July 2025 first-time takers)
- Website: www.usfca.edu/law
- ABA profile

The University of San Francisco School of Law (USF Law) is the law school of the private University of San Francisco. It was established in 1912, received American Bar Association accreditation in 1935, and joined the Association of American Law Schools (AALS) in 1937.

== History ==
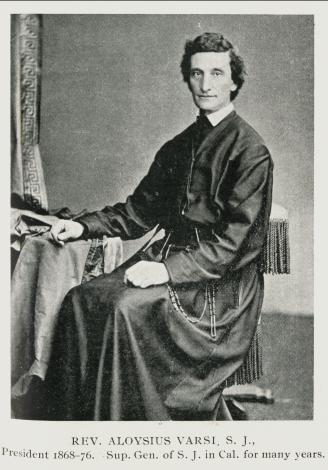
Aloysius Varsi, the founder of the law school

The institution that eventually became the University of San Francisco School of Law was formally established in 1912 as the St. Ignatius College of Law; it was then part of the institution of the same name that would eventually be reorganized as the University of San Francisco in 1930. The school was first located on the fifth floor of the Grant Building located on the corner of 7th and Market Street. Although not formally established as an autonomous department until over three decades later, St. Ignatius began to offer law courses to students in 1880 under the direction of Aloysius Brunengo However, by the beginning of the 20th century, as the city began to rapidly expand, and to particularly meet the growing desires of young Irish and Italian Americans interested in practicing law, it was determined that a more formal institution be inaugurated.

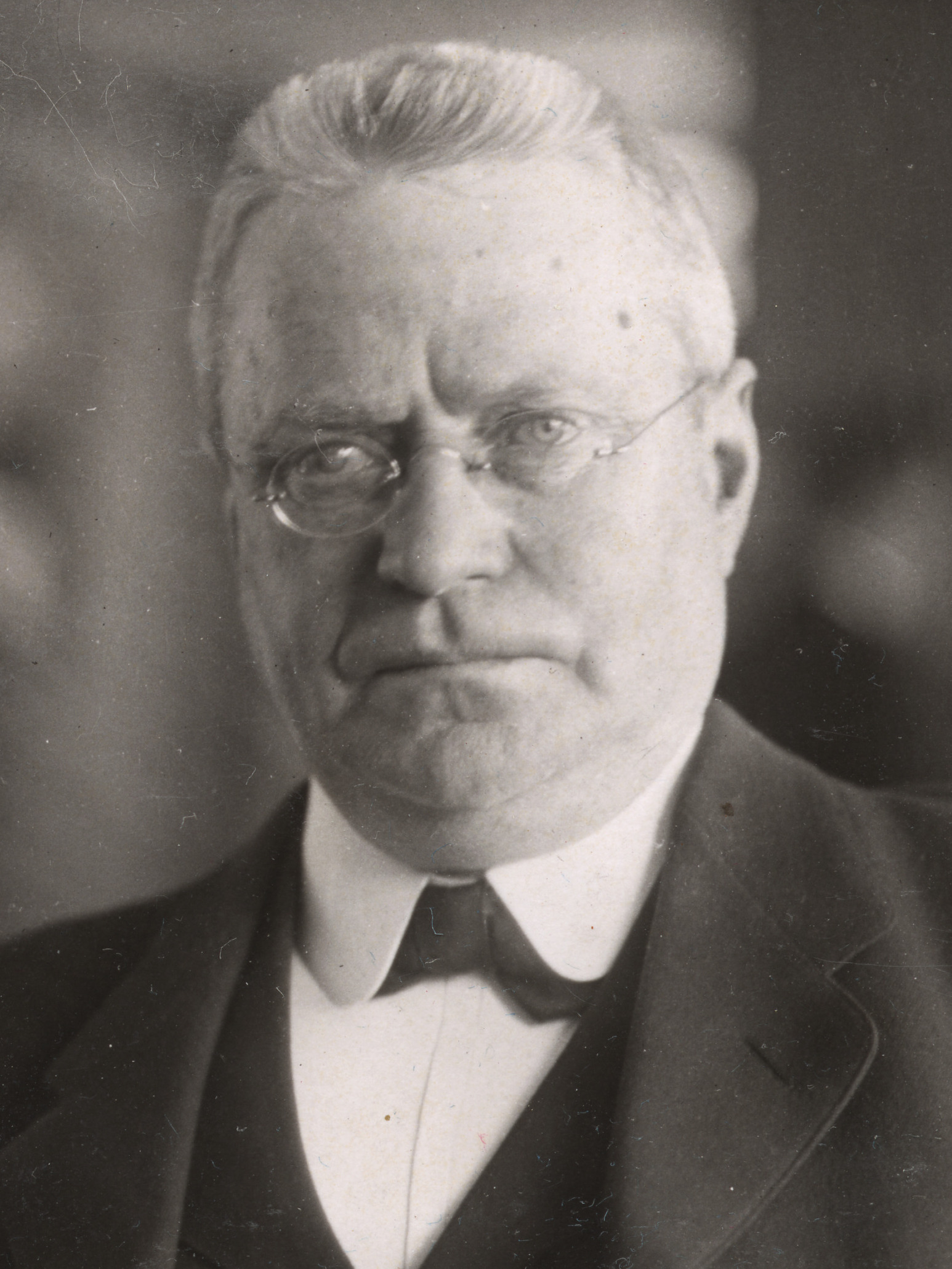
Matt Sullivan, the law school's first dean

The St. Ignatius College of Law was thus founded in September 18, 1912 as an evening program with 29 students. Among the students of this founding class was twenty-two year old Chan Chung Wing, who would become a prominent civil rights and immigration lawyer as well as the first Chinese American to practice law in California. Another student of this original class was twenty-two year old Vincent Hallinan, who would become a noted labor lawyer and be the Progressive Party candidate in 1952 Presidential Election, garnering the third highest number of votes. The law school's first dean was Matthew I. Sullivan, who would serve as Chief Justice of the Supreme Court of California from 1914 to 1915. Among the school's original faculty were: John J. Ford; George A. Connelly; Joseph Farry; Joseph W. Beretta; John O'Gara; and John J. O'Toole- who would eventually go on to serve as the City Attorney of San Francisco (1926-1949). Professor Farry would go on to teach at the law school for nearly half a century, retiring in 1957. Dean Sullivan's brother, Jeremiah F. Sullivan, who would later serve as a Justice of the Supreme Court of California (1926-1927), was also a professor at the law school during its earliest years.

Five years after its founding, in 1917 the school moved to the corner of Hays and Shrader Streets, into a building popularly referred to as the “Shirt Factory.” This was also the location of the rest of St. Ignatius after its original campus was destroyed during the 1906 San Francisco earthquake and subsequent fire. By the same year the student population would reach 149, although enrollment would quickly drop in half with America's entry into World War I. Throughout the 1920s, the school saw considerable success and growth. By 1920 the school was home to 109 students, and would further expand to 266 by the end of the decade in 1929. Many of the graduates of this era would go onto practice law in San Francisco and throughout the Bay Area, including fifteen judges. In 1927 the law school relocated once again, however, out of the downtown core and to the upper floor of Campion Hall (now Kalmanovitz Hall) on Lone Mountain, where the university resides today. That same year the law school accepted its first three female students, beginning what would become a long tradition of promoting women in the legal field. Several notable figures graduated from the law school during the 1920s, including future Chief Clerk of the California State Assembly Arthur Ohnimus (1921), Attorney General of California Thomas C. Lynch (1929), and federal judges William Thomas Sweigert (1923) and George Bernard Harris (1926).

Despite the onset of the Great Depression in 1929, the law school and college began to hit their stride. In 1930 St. Ignatius College was reorganized as the University of San Francisco, and the law school opened a day-time program the following year. In 1935 the law school was accredited by the American Bar Association, and joined the Association of American Law Schools in 1937. Lewis Cassidy would succeed Matthew Sullivan as the law school's second dean in 1934, and would himself be succeeded by Charles H. Kinnane in 1936. In 1939 Edward A. Hogan would be installed as the fourth dean, and would serve until 1951. The era saw numerous graduates make considerable contributions to the rapidly growing city and state, including California Supreme Court Justice Raymond L. Sullivan (1930) and Congressman and Mayor of San Francisco John F. Shelley (1932).

The 1940s and 1950s saw continual growth for the law school. As was the case decades before, the student population dropped with America's entry into World War II in 1941, however, swelled once again in the second half of the decade, particularly with the help of the G.I. Bill and economic boom of the post-war era. Vernon X. Miller was named dean in 1951, and would be followed by Francis R. Walsh in 1957. Notable graduates of the mid-century include the first Chief Justice of the Alaska Supreme Court Buell A. Nesbett (1940), long-serving federal judge and Nevada Attorney General Roger D. Foley (1946), noted judge and San Francisco Supervisor Dorothy von Beroldingen (1954), and future California Lieutenant Governor Leo T. McCarthy (1958). Between 1953 and 1958, the law school had one of the highest bar passage rates in the state.

The 1960s saw the law school to begin to settle into its contemporary state. Dean Walsh ambitiously sought to expand the institution and in 1960 secured a $1,000,000 donation from the wealthy San Francisco industrialist and philanthropist Charles Kendrick to construct a new, permanent home for the law school. Kendrick Hall, located at 2199 Fulton Street and directly across from the collegiate parish of St. Ignatius, was completed in 1962 and was dedicated by Archbishop Joseph Thomas McGucken and United States Attorney General Robert F. Kennedy. There were around 325 students for much of the 1960s, and doubling to over 750 during the 1970s. Notable graduates of this era include long-time California legislator and Congressman John Burton (1960), California Supreme Court Justice Ming Chin (1967), Illinois Supreme Court Justice Mary Jane Theis (1974), and Michigan Attorney General Bill Schuette (1979).

In 1989, for the first time women made of 51% of the total law student population. In 1999, alumnus Arthur Zief (1947) donated $3,200,000 for the construction of the Dorraine Zief Law Library, located next to Kendrick Hall. The law school celebrated its centennial anniversary in 2012.

Today the University of San Francisco Law School is home to over 360 students of many backgrounds and origins and is the alma mater of thousands of graduates who can be found throughout the Bay Area, California, and the world. To date, alumni include over 330 judges serving on federal, state, and local courts across the state and country. In keeping with its Catholic and Jesuit roots and traditions, the law school has long claimed to focus on social, economic, and environmental justice. Susan Freiwald, the law school's first female dean, was installed in 2018.

== Campus ==
The University of San Francisco School of Law's Koret Law Center occupies two buildings on the 55-acre (220,000 m^{2}) hilltop USF campus overlooking Golden Gate Park, the Pacific Ocean and downtown San Francisco.

== Academics ==
USF offers full- and part-time programs leading to the J.D. degree. Students can also enroll in the J.D./M.B.A. program which takes four years of study. USF also offers a J.D./Master of Urban and Public Affairs dual degree program. J.D. students can also receive certificates at graduation in Public Interest Law, Intellectual Property, Employment Law, International Law, and other areas. USF also offers a Master of Laws (LL.M.) degree program for foreign lawyers who have first degrees in law from a non-American university as well as an LL.M. in Intellectual Property and Technology law for foreign and American lawyers. USF also offers an LL.M. in Taxation for foreign and domestic students with law degrees, as well as a Master of Legal Studies in Taxation (M.L.S.T.) for students with a bachelor's degree.

=== Admissions ===
For students in the Fall 2025 incoming class, the median LSAT score was 155 and the median undergraduate GPA was 3.47. The school accepted 55% of applicants, and 15.27% of those accepted enrolled. Following the 2022-2023 academic year, 16% of first year students left USF Law for academic (11.0%) or non-academic (5.0%) reasons.

=== Rankings ===
U.S. News & World Report ranks USF Law No.156 out of 196 schools.

In 2025, Princeton Review placed USF Law fourth in the country for Greatest Resources for Minority Students.

== Bar examination passage ==
The July 2025 California bar passage rate for first-time USF Law examinees was 85.5%.

== Post-graduation employment ==
According to the University of San Francisco School of Law's official 2025 ABA-required disclosures, 65.8% of the Class of 2024 obtained full-time, long-term, JD-required employment (i.e. as attorneys) nine months after graduation, excluding solo-practitioners.

ABA Employment Summary for 2024 Graduates
Employment Status	Percentage
Employed - Bar Passage Required	67.5%
Employed - J.D. Advantage	11.7%
Employed - Professional Position	1.7%
Employed - Law School Funded	0.8%
Employed - Non-Professional Position	3.3%
Employed - Enrolled in Graduate Studies	2.5%
Employed - Start Date Deferred	0.8%
Unemployed - Not Seeking	0.8%
Unemployed - Seeking	10.8%
Total of 120 Graduates

== Costs ==
The total cost of attendance (indicating the cost of tuition, fees, and living expenses) at the University of San Francisco School of Law for the 2019-2020 academic year is $80,307. The Law School Transparency estimated debt-financed cost of attendance for three years is $286,033.

== Publications ==
The Law School has several school-sponsored publications in which students can participate.

- University of San Francisco Law Review
- Intellectual Property and Technology Law Journal (formerly the Intellectual Property Law Bulletin)
- USF Maritime Law Journal

== Student life ==
The USF student body is among the most ethnically diverse in the country, and ranked fourth for greatest resources for minority students. USF sponsors dozens of student groups encompassing a wide range of demographic and practice area interests. In addition, the Public Interest Law Foundation holds an annual auction, drawing lawyers, judges and other community members in support of the school's commitment to public service. In 2017, USF opened a new residence hall for priority use by law students.

== Institutes, centers and special projects ==
USF sponsors a range of institutes, centers and special projects. In addition, USF sponsors summer programs for its students in Prague, Dublin, and Budapest. The exchange programs include instruction at Trinity College in Dublin, Ireland, and Charles University in Prague, Czech Republic. Relevant international coursework includes the study of European Community Law, International Business Transactions, and European Constitutionalism.

Students get hands-on training in IP and technology law through the CREATE Law Clinic and the Center for Law, Tech, and Social Good.

In addition, USF hosts programs designed specifically for students such as the Keta Taylor Colby Death Penalty Project, which places students in the South working on death penalty appeals. Students can also participate in the Intensive Advocacy Project, which brings students from a variety of law schools and places them in an intensive trial advocacy class featuring local practitioners as teachers.

The school also provides ongoing mentoring through its chapter of the American Inns of Court.

== Dorraine Zief Law Library ==
The Dorraine Zief Law Library opened in 2000. Three years later, the law school's main classroom and administration building, Kendrick Hall, reopened after an extensive renovation.

== Deans ==
1. Matt Sullivan, 1912-1934
2. Lewis Cassidy, 1934-1936
3. Charles H. Kinnane, 1936-1939
4. Edward A. Hogan, 1939-1951
5. Vernon X. Miller, 1951-1957
6. Francis R. Walsh, 1957-1970
7. C. Delos Putz, 1971-1975
8. Paul L. McKaskle, 1975-1980
9. Joseph T. Henke, 1980-1982
10. David Ratner, 1982-1989
11. H. Jay Folberg, 1989-1999
12. Jeffrey Brand, 1999-2013
13. John D. Trasviña, 2013-2018
14. Susan Freiwald, 2019-2024
15. Johanna Kalb, 2024-present

== Notable faculty ==
- Shalanda Baker, former associate professor (2012-2014)
- Lara Bazelon, professor of law and writer
- Winfried Brugger, former visiting professor (2002)
- Maya Harris, former adjunct professor
- Richard Leo, professor of criminal procedure
- J. Thomas McCarthy, emeritus professor, former professor of property and technology law; author of McCarthy on Trademarks and Unfair Competition
- Thomas Nazario, professor
- John Jay Osborn Jr. (deceased), former professor of contract law (1991-2018); author of The Paper Chase
- Eva Paterson, former adjunct professor of civil rights and public interest law
- John A. Powell, former professor
- Jeremiah F. Sullivan (deceased), early professor (1910s); former justice of the Supreme Court of California (1926-1927)
- Matt Sullivan (deceased), first dean of the University of San Francisco Law School (then called St Ignatius School of Law) (1912-1937); former 16th chief justice of the Supreme Court of California (1914-1915)
- John D. Trasviña, former dean (2013-2018); former assistant secretary of fair housing at HUD and president of the Mexican American Legal Defense and Education Fund
- Kathryn Werdegar, former associate dean and professor; former justice of the California Courts of Appeal (1991-1994) and California Supreme Court (1994-2017)
- Nicole Wong, former adjunct professor of media and internet law (1997-1999); deputy Chief Technology Officer of the United States (2013-2014)
