= Saul Kassin =

American professor

Saul Kassin is an American academic. He is Distinguished Professor Emeritus of Psychology at the City University of New York's John Jay College of Criminal Justice and Massachusetts Professor Emeritus of Psychology at Williams College in Williamstown, Massachusetts.

== Education and Career ==
Saul M. Kassin was born in April 1953 in Brooklyn, New York. He later attended Far Rockaway High School in Queens between the years 1967 and 1971. From 1971 to 1974, Kassin was enrolled in Brooklyn College, graduating with his Bachelor of Science degree. While there, he assisted cognitive psychologist Arthur S. Reber with running experiments on implicit learning. From 1974 to 1978, he attended the University of Connecticut in Storrs, Connecticut, where he received his Ph.D. in personality and social psychology and studied attribution theory with Charles A. Lowe. In 1978-1979, he worked as a postdoctoral research fellow to study jury decision-making with Lawrence S. Wrightsman at the University of Kansas in Lawrence, Kansas.

Kassin taught at Purdue University in West Lafayette, Indiana for two years before moving in 1981 to Williams College, where he spent the bulk of his academic career. On a sabbatical from Williams, Kassin was awarded a U.S. Supreme Court Judicial Fellowship in 1984-1985, during which time he worked at the Federal Judicial Center in Washington, DC. Then in 1985-1986, he spent the year on a postdoctoral fellowship at Stanford University in Stanford, California. In 2006, Kassin accepted a Distinguished Professorship at John Jay College of Criminal Justice of the City University of New York. He retired in January 2026 and is now a Professor Emeritus both at Williams and at John Jay College.

== Research ==
In the 1980s, Kassin pioneered the scientific study of false confessions--why they happen and the cascading consequences that follow. At the time, the pages of history had provided some examples, beginning with the Salem witch trials of 1692. Then in 1819, two men in Vermont were interrogated into confessing to a murder. While they were in prison, the alleged victim was found alive. In more recent years, case studies of wrongful convictions also consistently demonstrated the problem. Then in 1985, Kassin and Lawrence Wrightsman introduced a taxonomy that distinguished three types of false confessions—voluntary, compliant, and internalized. This classification scheme is still widely accepted and used all over the world.

Concerned that certain commonly used deceptive interrogation tactics increase the risk that innocent people would confess, Kassin and his students and colleagues went on to innovate laboratory methods for studying these processes in controlled experiments. In one early study, for example, Kassin and Kiechel created the now-famous computer crash experiment in which they used the false evidence ploy to induce innocent college students to confess that they had tampered with a computer, causing it to crash. Some of the students even internalized the belief they had crashed the computer and confabulated false memories to correspond with that belief. A few years later, Russano and others introduced the “cheating paradigm” in which some participants but not others were induced into an act that violated the terms of the experiment. The researchers were then able to assess the extent to which various interrogation tactics elicited true vs. false (i.e., "diagnostic") confessions.

Numerous other empirical articles were then published on the subject of confessions that have introduced such terms as positive coercion bias, minimization and maximization, guilt-presumptive interrogation, the phenomenology of innocence, and the forensic confirmation bias. Research has shown that observers (including experienced investigators) cannot distinguish between true and false confessions.--and that judges, juries, and others are quick to believe false confessions even when they are coerced and recanted, and even when contradicted eyewitnesses, alibis, DNA, and other evidence.. Not everyone in the law enforcement community agrees with these criticisms.. But a 2018 survey of confession experts worldwide indicated a high consensus of opinions on these issues within the scientific community.

Taken together, research findings indicate clearly that investigators should be required to record their interrogations with suspects, from start to finish and without exception. With funding support from the National Science Foundation, he and several colleagues conducted a series of experiments on the effects of video recording on police, suspects, and lay fact finders--including the first fully randomized field experiment involving actual suspects. The results have all been published.Some thirty states, the District of Columbia, and federal law enforcement agencies now have a recording requirement in place.

== Books ==
Over the years, Kassin has authored and edited several books, including: The Psychology of Evidence and Trial Procedure, The American Jury on Trial: Psychological Perspectives, and Confessions in the Courtroom (all with Lawrence S. Wrightsman). He is lead author of the textbook Social Psychology with Steven Fein and Hazel Rose Markus., now in its twelfth edition. He also recently edited Pillars of Social Psychology, a collection of memoirs contributed by legendary social psychologists from the 1950s to the present day.

In 2022, Kassin authored DUPED: Why Innocent People Confess - And Why We Believe Their Confessions. Combining high- and low-profile real world cases and psychological research, this book describes how this unimaginable aspect of human behavior can happen--and then how false confessions corrupt forensics and other evidence, often stigmatizing innocents for life. In 2026, he edited CHAMPIONS OF INNOCENCE: Inside the Fight Against Wrongful Convictions. Introduced by John Grisham, this collection of essays is written by founders of the innocence movement, scientists, legal scholars, exoneree-advocates, and journalists in the media.

== Awards and Public Appearances ==
Kassin's psychology and law research and writing has been cited all over the world. He has worked on many high-profile cases and with the Innocence Project to help prevent and correct wrongful convictions. He has testified as an expert witness in state, federal, and military courts and was the subject of a feature article published in SCIENCE. Kassin has won lifetime contribution awards from the International Investigative Interviewing Research Group (iiiRG), the American Psychology-Law Society (AP-LS), and the European Association of Psychology and the Law (EAPL). In 2017, he received the American Psychological Association (APA) Award for Distinguished Contributions to Psychology in the Public Interest. In 2021, he received the James McKeen Cattell Lifetime Achievement Award for Applied Research from the Association for Psychological Science (APS).

Kassin was the president of Division 41 of APA, a.k.a. AP-LS. Over the years, he has appeared as a guest analyst on all major TV networks, Oprah Winfrey and other syndicated shows, and in a number of podcasts - including Shankar Vedantam's Hidden Brain, Dax Shepard's Armchair Expert, and Erin Moriarty's My Life of Crime - and documentaries such as the 2012 film by Ken Burns, Sarah Burns, and David McMahon titled The Central Park Five. To raise public awareness, he has also written several newspaper editorials and an article on the false confessions that surrounded the infamous 1964 killing of Kitty Genovese.

== Advocacy ==
Kassin is a staunch critic of deceptive interrogation tactics that cause innocent people to confess. In light of controversies over whether the Miranda warning and waiver requirementprotects innocent people as intended,, he has coauthored two influential APA Scientific Reviews ("White Papers") of the literature, both accompanied by recommendations for reform.

In 2010, Kassin, along with fellow experts Steven Drizin, Thomas Grisso, Gisli Gudjonsson, Richard Leo, and Allison Redlich, published an AP-LS Scientific Review Paper titled "Police-Induced Confessions: Risk Factors and Recommendations," which concluded with a strong recommendation for the mandatory electronic recording of interrogations.

In light of an explosion of new cases and research, Kassin and fellow experts Hayley Cleary, Gisli Gudjonsson, Richard Leo, [Christian Meissner, Allison Redlich, and Kyle Scherr--revised and published that paper in 2025. Their article concluded with several proposed remedies, including the requirement that all suspect interviews be fully recorded from start to finish; that deceptive interrogation tactics be replaced by science-based methods of investigative interviewing, that youthful suspects and vulnerable adults be protected by access to counsel, and that forensic examiners be shielded from confessions to ensure the independence of their judgments.
