= Burchard Villiger =

Swiss Jesuit and missionary

The Reverend Burchard Villiger SJ
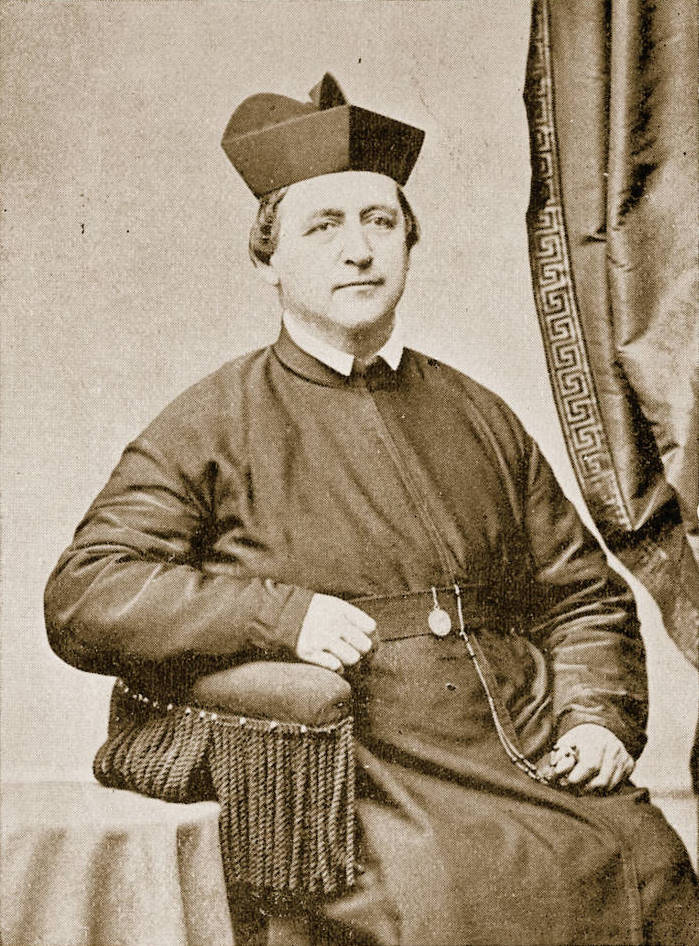
- Villiger between 1860 and 1865

7th Rector of Woodstock College
- In office 1897–1901
- Preceded by: Joseph Jerge
- Succeeded by: William P. Brett

5th President of Saint Joseph's College
- In office 1868–1893
- Preceded by: Felix-Joseph Barbelin
- Succeeded by: Patrick J. Dooley

3rd President of the St. Ignatius College
- In office 1865–1866
- Preceded by: Nicholas Congiato
- Succeeded by: Nicholas Congiato

4th President of Santa Clara College
- In office 1861–1865
- Preceded by: Felix Cicaterri
- Succeeded by: Aloysius Masnata

Personal details
- Born: May 14, 1819 Auw, Aargau, Switzerland
- Died: November 5, 1902 (aged 83) Philadelphia, Pennsylvania, United States

Joseph Burchard Villiger SJ (May 14, 1819 – November 5, 1902) was appointed Santa Clara University's fourth president in 1861 after the presidency of Felix Cicaterri. Burchard Villiger had served as the president of two Jesuit Colleges in the east. During his presidency at Santa Clara University in California United States he had built the Science Building, a Jesuit Residence, and the Facade of the Old Mission Church. He served as president till 1865 which coincided with the Civil War. Later Villiger was rector of the College of the Sacred Heart in Woodstock, Maryland.

In 1857, Villiger was appointed president of Washington Seminary (later known as Gonzaga College High School) in Washington, D.C., succeeding Hippolyte J. De Neckere. His presidency came in an end the following year, and he was succeeded by Charles H. Stonestreet.

He retired to his Church of the Gesú of Philadelphia, Pennsylvania, where he died on November 5, 1902.

== Early life ==
Burchard Villiger was born on the morning of May 14, 1819, in Auw, Aargau, Switzerland. That afternoon, he was baptized at the local parish church by the pastor, a Benedictine priest from Engelberg Abbey, and he was given the Christian name of Joseph Burchard. (Note: Though his full name was Joseph Burchard Villiger, he was known only as Burchard Villiger in everyday life.) Afterwards, he was offered up to the Virgin Mary at the high altar. Villiger was confirmed by the Apostolic Nuncio to Switzerland, Archbishop Ignazio Nasalli-Ratti, when he was eighteen months old at a church in the town of Cham.

Villiger had five siblings. His older sister, Mary, became a Benedictine nun at the Sarnen Abbey, and his younger sister, married. His three younger brothers also married and had families.

From the age of five and a half, Villiger attended parochial school, and he received his First Communion when he was eight years old. Shortly after his First Communion, he went with his mother and sister on a 27-mile (43-kilometre) pilgrimage to the Marian shrine at Einsiedeln Abbey. When he was 11 years old, Villiger was sent to live with his cousin, a priest, in Abtwyl to pursue higher studies and discern a religious vocation. The following year, he began his classical studies as a boarding student at Muri Abbey. After three years of study, the Swiss government prohibited Catholic monks from teaching, and Villiger continued his studies at a gymnasium in Zug, which was taught by secular priests. The Jesuits opened a college in Schwyz that year, and Villiger enrolled.

In August 1838, after completing his study of rhetoric, Villiger applied to join the Society of Jesus. He was admitted on October 4, and proceeded to the Jesuit novitiate in Brig-Glis, Valais. On October 10, 1840, he professed his vows at the novitiate. In 1842, Villiger went to Fribourg to study philosophy and physics and in 1844, returned to Jesuit college in Schwyz as the first prefect and as a teacher of mathematics. The following year, he returned to Fribourg to study theology.

The Sonderbund War broke out in 1845, and Villiger was forced out of Fribourg with all his fellow Jesuits.

He then went to Solothurn and awaited orders from the Jesuit provincial superior.

== Washington and Maryland ==
Villiger became the president of the Washington Seminary, later known as Gonzaga College High School, on August 15, 1857, succeeding Hippolyte J. De Neckere. Villiger's tenure was short-lived, lasting only nine months, because on April 25, 1858, he was named to succeed Charles H. Stonestreet as the provincial superior of the Jesuit Maryland Province, and Stonestreet replaced him as president.

Villiger's term as provincial came to an end on November 28, 1859, with the arrival of Felix Sopranis as the Jesuit visitor for North America.

== Santa Clara College ==
On May 21, 1861, Villiger arrived at Santa Clara College, succeeding Felix Cicaterri as its president. He found the school $30,000 in debt, equivalent to $1,070,000 in 2025.

== Later years ==
Villiger died on November 5, 1902, in Philadelphia.

== Saint Joseph's College ==
Villiger Hall opened in 2012 as a student dormitory named in his honor.

== Notes ==
Academic offices
Preceded by Hippolyte J. De Neckere	8th President of Washington Seminary; 1857–1858	Succeeded by Charles H. Stonestreet as President of Gonzaga College
Preceded by Felix Cicaterri	4th President of Santa Clara College; 1861–1865	Succeeded by Aloysius Masnata
Preceded by Nicholas Congiato	3rd President of the St. Ignatius College; 1865–1866	Succeeded by Nicholas Congiato
Preceded by Felix-Joseph Barbelin	5th President of Saint Joseph's College; 1868–1893	Succeeded by Patrick J. Dooley
Preceded by Joseph Jerge	Rector of Woodstock College; 1897–1901	Succeeded by William P. Brett
Catholic Church titles
Preceded by Charles H. Stonestreet	8th Provincial Superior of the Jesuit Maryland Province; 1858–1859	Succeeded by Felix Sopranis as Visitor of North America
New office	1st Pastor of the Church of the Gesú; 1868–1893	Succeeded by Patrick J. Dooley
