= John Pinasco =

John Pinasco S.J.
- Rev. John Pinasco, SJ as President of Santa Clara College

6th President of Santa Clara University
- In office 1880–1883
- Preceded by: Aloysius Brunengo, S.J.
- Succeeded by: Robert E. Kenna, S.J.

10th President of Santa Clara University
- In office 1888–1893
- Preceded by: Robert E. Kenna, S.J.
- Succeeded by: Joseph W. Riordan, S.J.

Personal details
- Born: 11 June 1837; Genoa
- Died: 9 March 1897 (aged 59); Los Gatos, California
- Profession: Jesuit priest

Rev. John Pinasco, SJ, (11 June 1837 – 9 March 1897), was born in the vicinity of Genoa and entered the Jesuit Novitiate at Bonaecola in 1853. In 1858, he was sent to the Jesuit college at Stonyhurst to study philosophy with Rev. Father Bayma, SJ, one of the premier professors of the Society of Jesus in Europe.

Pinasco came directly to Santa Clara College in 1860, where he taught until 1876 with a four-year break for additional theological training at Georgetown University between 1868 and 1872.

In 1876, he moved to the University of San Francisco, where he served as president. Thereafter, he twice served Santa Clara College in the same capacity, (1880–1883 and 1888–1893, respectively).

Fr. Pinasco died at the Sacred Heart Novitiate in Los Gatos, aged 59.
