= Aloysius Masnata =

Italian-American priest and academic administrator

Aloysius Masnata S.J.

5th President of Santa Clara University
- In office 1865–1868
- Preceded by: Burchard Villiger, S.J.
- Succeeded by: Aloysius Varsi, S.J.

Personal details
- Born: May 2, 1823 Rivarolo, Genoa, Italy
- Died: November 18, 1886 (aged 63) Los Gatos, California
- Education: Georgetown College
- Profession: Jesuit priest

Aloysius Masnata, (S.J.) (May 2, 1823 – November 18, 1886) was the 5th president of Santa Clara University, California, United States. He was a Genoese priest. At the age of seventeen he was admitted into the novitiate of the Society of Jesus. After studying philosophy and rhetoric and teaching for a year, he was sent to Vals, France, for the study of theology. After his study in France, he immigrated to the United States with other Jesuits after ordination and completed his fourth year of theology at Georgetown College along with Rev. Salvator Canio and Rev. Joseph Bixio. After his study he spent four years teaching rhetoric at Frederick, Maryland, where he was minister and socius to the master of novices. In 1854 Masnata S.J. sailed to California through Panama and arrived in San Francisco, United States, along with Fr. Charles Messea S.J. and Fr. Anthony Maraschi S.J. In 1865 he was appointed Santa Clara University's fifth president successor of the presidency of Burchard Villiger. In 1868, shy and lacking in proper English, Masnata was replaced by Aloysius Varsi. In 1873 Fr. Aloysius Masnata, S.J. served as the 6th president of San Francisco's St. Ignatius College. On November 18, 1886, Aloysius Masnata died in Los Gatos, California.

== External sources ==
- University of Santa Clara (1912). University of Santa Clara. University of Santa Clara: a history from the founding of Santa Clara Mission in 1777 to the beginning of the University in 1912. Harvard College Library: University Press. p. 23.
- Mckevitt, Gerald (1979). The University of Santa Clara: A History, 1851-1977 (illustrated ed.). Santa Clara University: Stanford University Press. pp. 47, 93, 329, 331, 380. ISBN 9780804710244.
- Riordan, Joseph (1905). The first half century of St. Ignatius Church and College. The University of California: H.S. Crocker Co. p. 284.
- Salvatore, LaGumina (2000). The Italian American experience: an encyclopedia. Garland reference Library of the humanities Special - Reference Series. Vol. 1535 (illustrated ed.). Santa Clara University: Taylor & Francis. pp. 285, 725. ISBN 9780815307136.
