= James A. Ward =

19th-century American Jesuit

The Reverend James A. Ward

3rd President of Saint Joseph's College
- In office 1857–1860
- Preceded by: James A. Ryder
- Succeeded by: Felix-Joseph Barbelin

Personal details
- Born: September 1, 1813 Philadelphia, Pennsylvania, U.S.
- Died: April 29, 1891 (aged 77) Washington, D.C., U.S.
- Education: Washington Seminary; Georgetown College

Orders
- Ordination: July 4, 1843 by Samuel Eccleston

James A. Ward (September 1, 1813 – April 29, 1891) was an American Catholic priest and Jesuit. He taught for many years at Georgetown and at the novitiate in Frederick, Maryland, of which he twice served as rector. He then became the vice president of Georgetown and was influential in the early years of Loyola College in Maryland. From 1857 to 1860, he was the President of Saint Joseph's College. He spent his later years as socius (assistant) to the Jesuit provincial superior in New York City, and teaching.

== Early life ==
James A. Ward was born on September 1, 1813, in Philadelphia, Pennsylvania. At a young age, he moved to Washington, D.C., to live with his uncle, near the Capitol building. His uncle enrolled him in Washington Seminary (later known as Gonzaga College High School) and he enrolled in Georgetown College in 1829. While there, he entered the Society of Jesus on August 6, 1832, and proceeded to the Jesuit novitiate at White Marsh Manor in Maryland. He became the second to last surviving Jesuit educated at the novitiate in White Marsh, which had moved to Frederick, Maryland, in 1834.

== Teaching ==
In 1833, he returned to Georgetown, where he taught and remained for the rest of his scholasticate. At Georgetown, Ward was ordained a priest of the Catholic Church by Archbishop Samuel Eccleston on July 4, 1843. As a professor, he taught higher mathematics and classics. Around this time, he developed health problems that left him temporarily unable to speak and later with impaired speech, which prevented him from preaching. Ward completed his theological studies and continued teaching at Georgetown for another six years. From 1845 to 1846, he taught rhetoric, before becoming minister and prefect of schools. In 1850, while still prefect, he was appointed vice president of Georgetown. On one occasion, while the President of Georgetown College, James A. Ryder, was away from the school, a student rebellion broke out, which Ward was able to quell.

In September 1850, he returned to the novitiate in Frederick, where he taught mathematics. The following year, he was put in charge of classes at the Washington Seminary. Ward played a key role in the early years of Loyola College in Maryland, which was founded in 1852. For a time, he served as its prefect of studies. In 1857, he became President of Saint Joseph's College in Philadelphia, succeeding James A. Ryder. His term ended in 1860, when he was succeeded by Felix-Joseph Barbelin. He is depicted as a gargoyle on Barbelin Hall at Saint Joseph's University.

== Later years ==
On August 15, 1861, Ward succeeded Bernardin F. Wiget as the master of novices of the Jesuits' Maryland Province and Angelo M. Paresce as the rector of the St. Stanislaus Novitiate in Frederick. He would remain in those offices until September 4, 1863, when he was succeeded by Joseph O'Callaghan. With the start of the American Civil War, Ward made publicly known his fervent support of the Confederacy.

Following the war, he returned to Georgetown in 1865 as vice president, prefect of studies, and professor of rhetoric, where he remained until August 15, 1869, when he again became the rector of the St. Stanislaus Novitiate, succeeding Joseph O'Callaghan. He concurrently resumed the role of master of novices on February 23, 1872, succeeding Felix Cicaterri. Ward also taught as a professor at the novitiate. Ward remained as rector until October 1, 1877, when he was succeeded by Archibald J. Tisdall. For many years, Ward was also the socius (assistant) to the provincial superior, which required him to live near St. Francis Xavier College in New York City.

For ten years, Ward was the prefect of studies at the College of the Holy Cross in Massachusetts and at Loyola College in Maryland, and then returned to the Frederick novitiate as the master of novices and vice rector from September 14, 1889, to December 17, 1891, succeeding Michael O'Kane and being succeeded by John H. O'Rourke. Finally, he returned to Georgetown, where he served as spiritual father. Ward died at Georgetown University on April 29, 1891.

Academic offices
Preceded by James A. Ryder	3rd President of Saint Joseph's College; 1857–1860	Succeeded by Felix-Joseph Barbelin
Preceded by Angelo M. Paresce	4th Rector of St. Stanislaus Novitiate; 1861–1863	Succeeded by Joseph O'Callaghan
Preceded by Joseph O'Callaghan	6th Rector of St. Stanislaus Novitiate; 1869–1877	Succeeded by Archibald J. Tisdall
Catholic Church titles
Preceded by Bernardin F. Wiget	14th Master of Novices of the Jesuit Province of Maryland; 1861–1863	Succeeded by Joseph O'Callaghan
Preceded by Felix Cicaterri	17th Master of Novices of the Jesuit Province of Maryland; 1872–1877	Succeeded by Archibald J. Tisdall
Preceded by Michael O'Kane	20th Master of Novices of the Jesuit Province of Maryland; 1889–1891	Succeeded by John H. O'Rourke
