= Robert E. Kenna =

President of Santa Clara College, California

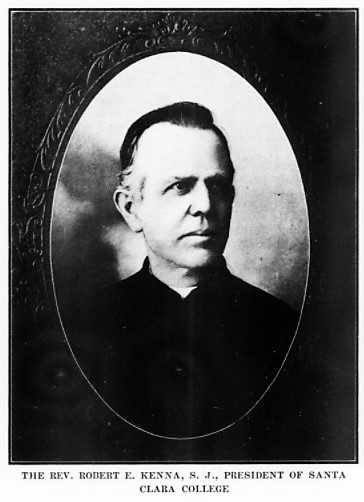
Portrait of Robert E. Kenna

Robert E. Kenna, S.J. (1844–1912) was appointed Santa Clara University's 9th and 12th president after the presidency of John Pinasco and Joseph W. Riordan. He was first a student, then professor, then president from 1888 to 1893 and again from 1899 to 1905.
