= Joseph Fessio =

American priest

The Reverend Joseph Fessio SJ
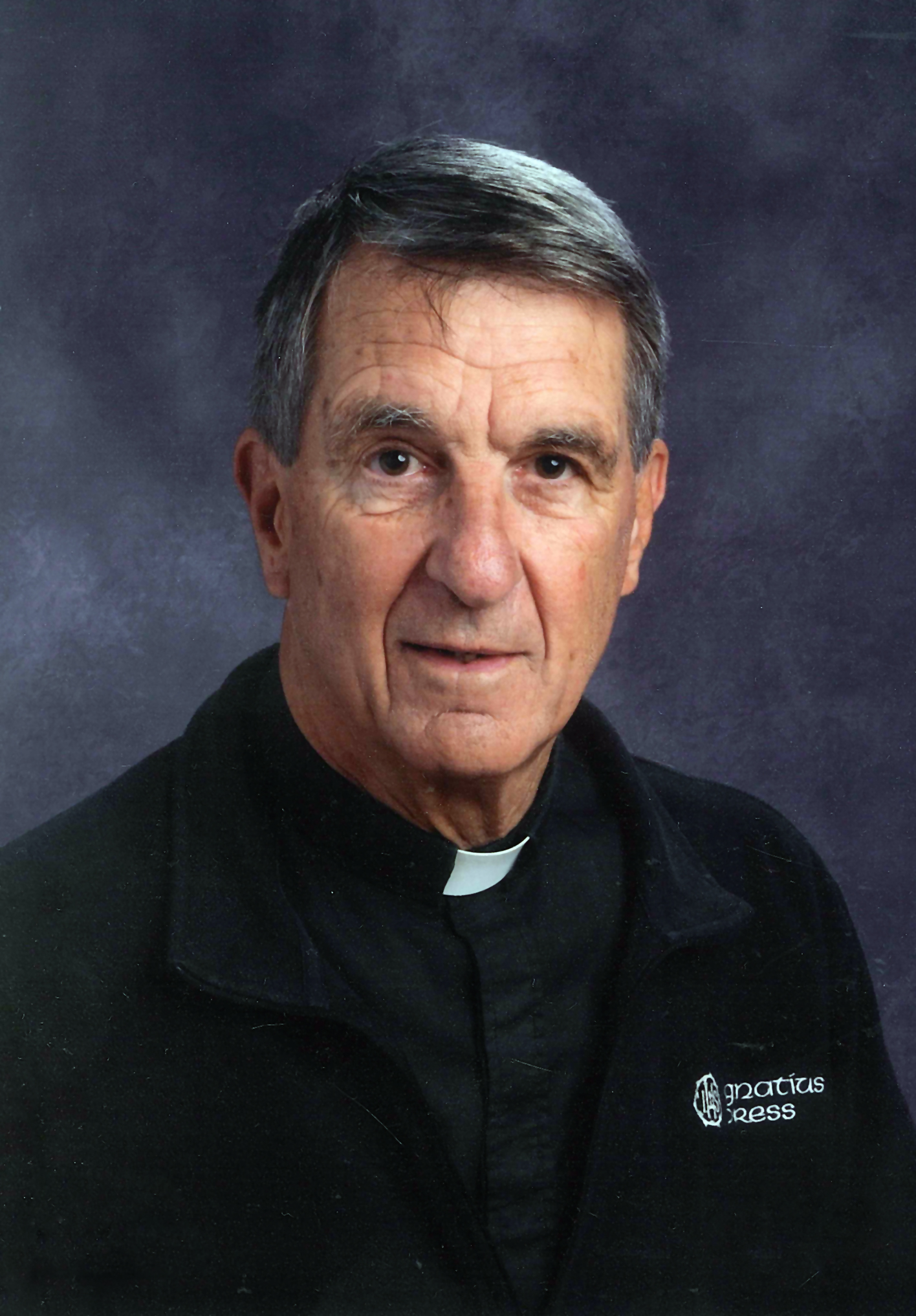

Orders
- Ordination: 1972

Personal details
- Born: Joseph Fessio; 10 January 1941 (age 85)
- Denomination: Catholic (Latin Church)
- Profession: Priest, teacher, editor, journalist

Ordination history of Joseph Fessio
History
Priestly ordination
- Date: June 10, 1972

Joseph Fessio SJ (born January 10, 1941) is an American Jesuit priest, as well as the founder and editor of Ignatius Press. After studying with Joseph Ratzinger (Pope Benedict XVI), he founded the St. Ignatius Institute at the University of San Francisco, one of the first Catholic Great Books programs in the United States, then served as the founding provost of Ave Maria University. He hosts the weekly podcast Father Fessio in Five.

== Life ==
Fessio attended high school at Bellarmine College Preparatory in San Jose, California, from 1954 to 1958. He took afterwards undergraduate studies in civil engineering at the University of Santa Clara, California. He entered the Jesuit novitiate on September 7, 1961. Before his ordination to the priesthood, he earned a B.A (in 1966) and an M.A. (in 1967) in Philosophy from Gonzaga University in Spokane, Washington. He also earned an M.A in Theology from his studies in Lyon, France. He was ordained a priest on June 10, 1972.

In 1975, he earned his doctorate in theology from the University of Regensburg, West Germany. His thesis director was Joseph Ratzinger, the future-Pope Benedict XVI. The subject of his thesis was The Ecclesiology of Hans Urs von Balthasar.

== Ecclesiastical and professional career ==
From 1966 - 1974 Fessio taught philosophy and theology at Gonzaga University and at the University of Santa Clara and University of San Francisco in California. In 1976 he founded the St. Ignatius Institute at the University of San Francisco, and in 1978 he founded and became the first editor of Ignatius Press. He directed the Saint Ignatius Institute until 1987 when he was removed from his position as Director by Father President, John LoSchiavo, S.J., in a dispute over management of a $1,000,000 donation. He remained a professor in the program.

In 1987 he was a Peritus at the Seventh Ordinary General Assembly of Bishops, held at the Vatican, and delivered a paper arguing that girls and women should be excluded from the offices of altar server and lector at the Catholic Mass.

He was the editor of 30 Days, In the Church and the World, from 1988 to 1991, and in 1991 became the publisher of the Catholic World Report. In 1995 he was the publisher of Catholic Dossier, Catholic Faith, and Homiletic & Pastoral Review.

In 1995 he co-founded Adoremus, the Society for the Renewal of the Sacred Liturgy.

In 1998 he founded the Catholic Radio Network.

In March 2002, he founded Campion College of San Francisco. However, that same month Thomas Smolich, the provincial superior of the Jesuits in California, ordered him to disassociate from the college and to serve as a hospital chaplain in Duarte, California, although he retained leadership of Ignatius Press.

In 2007, he was fired from his position as provost of Ave Maria University over "irreconcilable differences over administrative policies and practices". He was reinstated as a theologian in residence the next day, and remained a supporter of the university. In 2009, he was fired from his faculty position at the university after expressing concern regarding the university's financial situation due to certain policies of the administration.

In 2019, he became the co-host of the Formed Book Club with Joseph Pearce and Vivian Dudro. In 2023, he launched a weekly spiritual podcast series called Father Fessio in Five.
