= Felix Cicaterri =

3rd president of Santa Clara University

Felix Cicaterri S.J.

3rd President of Santa Clara University
- In office 1857–1861
- Preceded by: Nicholas Congiato, S.J.
- Succeeded by: Burchard Villiger, S.J.

Personal details
- Born: July 3, 1804 Venice, Italy
- Died: July 15, 1873 (aged 69) Woodstock, Maryland
- Profession: Jesuit priest

Felix Cicaterri, (S.J.) (July 3, 1804 – July 15, 1873) was the third president of Santa Clara University, California, United States. He was also a one-time rector of Verona's Jesuit College. In 1848 he was made president of the Jesuit College at Vienna now the University of Vienna. After immigrating to the United States, he was a professor of divinity at St. John's College in Fordham, New York. Later he taught philosophy at Georgetown College in the United States.

On March 11, 1857, Cicaterri was appointed Santa Clara University's third president and inherited the financial woes created by construction projects. Cicaterri was removed from the University's presidency in 1861 due to Rome's displeasure.

On August 15, 1869, Cicaterri became the sixteenth master of novices of the Jesuits' Maryland Province, succeeding Joseph O'Callaghan. He held this position until he was succeeded by James A. Ward on February 23, 1872. In January 1873, he was sent to the College of the Sacred Heart in Woodstock, Maryland, where he died July 15, 1873.

== External sources ==
- University of Santa Clara (1912). University of Santa Clara. University of Santa Clara: a history from the founding of Santa Clara Mission in 1777 to the beginning of the University in 1912. Harvard College Library: University Press. pp. 10, 23, 54, 55.
- Mckevitt, Gerald (1979). The University of Santa Clara: A History, 1851-1977 (illustrated ed.). Santa Clara University: Stanford University Press. pp. 85, 98. ISBN 9780804710244.

Academic offices
Preceded by Nicholas Congiato	3rd President of Santa Clara University; 1857–1861	Succeeded by Burchard Villiger
Catholic Church titles
Preceded by Joseph O'Callaghan	16th Master of Novices of the Jesuit Province of Maryland; 1869–1872	Succeeded by James A. Ward
