= Joseph O'Callaghan =

American Jesuit educator (1824–1869)

The Reverend Joseph O'Callaghan SJ

3rd President of Loyola College in Maryland
- In office 1860–1863
- Preceded by: William Francis Clarke
- Succeeded by: Anthony F. Ciampi

Personal details
- Born: April 18, 1824 Dorchester, Massachusetts, U.S.
- Died: January 21, 1869 (aged 44) Aboard a ship in the Atlantic Ocean
- Education: College of the Holy Cross

Orders
- Ordination: July 25, 1857

Joseph O'Callaghan SJ (April 18, 1824 – January 21, 1869) was an American Catholic priest and Jesuit. Born in Massachusetts, he studied in Canada and then at the College of the Holy Cross before entering the Society of Jesus in 1844. O'Callaghan taught at Georgetown University before becoming the president of Loyola College in Maryland in 1860, where he remained for three years. In 1869, he was sent to Rome to represent the Jesuit Province of Maryland at the congregation of procurators; he died at sea while returning from the congregation.

== Early life ==
O'Callaghan was born on April 18, 1824, in Dorchester, Massachusetts, today part of the city of Boston. His father, Daniel, was born in Ireland. O'Callaghan studied at the Collège de Montréal, a Sulpician school in Canada, for six years and then enrolled at the College of the Holy Cross in Massachusetts.

On April 9, 1844, O'Callaghan entered the Society of Jesus at the novitiate in Frederick, Maryland. For 13 years, he engaged in his Jesuit formation, during which time he was also a teacher and prefect. This culminated in his ordination as a priest on July 25, 1857.

== Academic career ==
Following his ordination, O'Callaghan was appointed a professor of rhetoric at Georgetown University. In 1859, O'Callaghan became the pastor of St. Ignatius Church in Baltimore, Maryland, succeeding William Francis Clarke. In 1860, he became the president of Loyola College in Maryland, while remaining pastor of the church. O'Callaghan professed his fourth vow on August 15, 1861. He remained president of Loyola and pastor of St. Ignatius until 1863, when he was succeeded by Anthony F. Ciampi.

On September 4, 1863, O'Callaghan became the rector of St. Stanislaus novitiate in Frederick and became the master of novices of the Jesuit Province of Maryland, where he succeeded James A. Ward. He remained in this position until August 15, 1869, when he was replaced by Felix Cicaterri as master of novices and by Ward as rector. From 1867 to 1868, O'Callaghan was also the prefect of schools of Georgetown College, succeeding Bernard A. Maguire and preceding Patrick F. Healy.

== Death ==
In July 1868, O'Callaghan was appointed the procurator of the Jesuit Maryland Province, being sent to represent it at the congregation of procurators in Rome in November 1868. On January 21, while sailing across the Atlantic Ocean, back to the United States, a large wave struck his ship. The wave broke the walls of the cabin and threw a heavy table on top of O'Callaghan's chest, killing him almost instantly. Others aboard were also killed and seriously injured. While in Rome, O'Callaghan had been given papers appointing him the provincial superior of the Maryland Province, which he was carrying aboard the ship when he died.

O'Callaghan was buried at sea. A requiem Mass was said for him at St. Ignatius Church in Baltimore on February 16, 1869.

Academic offices
Preceded by William Francis Clarke	3rd President of Loyola College in Maryland; 1860–1863	Succeeded by Anthony F. Ciampi
Preceded by James A. Ward	5th Rector of St. Stanislaus Novitiate; 1863–1869	Succeeded by James A. Ward
Preceded by Bernard A. Maguire	21st Prefect of Schools of Georgetown College; 1867–1868	Succeeded by Patrick Francis Healy
Catholic Church titles
Preceded by William Francis Clarke	3rd Pastor of St. Ignatius Church; 1859–1863	Succeeded by Anthony F. Ciampi
Preceded by James A. Ward	15th Master of Novices of the Jesuit Province of Maryland; 1863–1869	Succeeded by Felix Cicaterri
