= Joseph Riordan =

Joseph Riordan may refer to:

- Joe Riordan (1930–2012), Australian politician and government minister
- Joseph W. Riordan (1816–1897), Santa Clara University president
