= Varsi (surname) =

Varsi is a surname. Notable people with the surname include:

- Aloysius Varsi (1830–1900), American educator and college president
- Diane Varsi (1938–1992), American actress
- Dinorah Varsi, Uruguayan classical pianist
- Turid Dørumsgaard Varsi (born 1938), Norwegian politician
