= St. Ignatius Institute =

Undergraduate program

The Saint Ignatius Institute (SII) is an undergraduate program at the University of San Francisco (USF), a private university operated by the USA West Province of the Society of Jesus (Jesuit Order) in San Francisco, California, United States.

In the 25 years after its inception in 1976, the SII granted its Certificate of Liberal Arts to approximately 1,000 students. During these years the SII generated both controversy and accolades due to its greater advocacy for Catholic doctrine within a diverse, more liberal Jesuit institution. It has since changed into a less dogmatic living-learning community, with Catholic doctrine playing a smaller part in its curriculum.

== Founding and Great Books curriculum ==
In 1976 a group of educators founded what their leader, the Rev. Joseph Fessio, S.J., called "a completely integrated liberal arts program in the Jesuit tradition." Fessio described SII as adhering to a more traditional Jesuit approach to education.

The four-year-long sequence of studies in the liberal arts was designed to follow a method of seminars and lectures based on the students' reading of the Great Books of the Western World, in a roughly historical order. The reading list mostly resembled those at other undergraduate colleges offering Great Books programs such as St. John's College in Annapolis, Maryland, and Santa Fe, New Mexico, and at Thomas Aquinas College, in Santa Paula, California.

SII students would read and discuss the same works from the official reading list of Great Books authors chosen for their impact on the intellectual life of Western Civilization, from various religious and philosophical traditions. For instance, in their first semester, freshmen read works by ancient Greeks and Semites, including Homer, Aristophanes, Sappho, and the Epic of Gilgamesh. At the same time, the SII also drew upon and emphasized Roman Catholic contributions to the Western tradition, as represented by such Catholic authors as the early Church Fathers, St. Augustine, Boethius, St. Thomas Aquinas, Dante, Chaucer and Miguel de Cervantes, as well as more recent Catholic thinkers like John Henry Newman, G. K. Chesterton, and the fathers of the Second Vatican Council.

Like Thomas Aquinas College, the SII espoused academic freedom by not limiting admissions to applicants of any religious or philosophical belief. Students tended to be Catholic, but some non-Catholics became students and faculty members.

Unlike some other institutions with Great Books curricula, the SII operates within a larger university and does not constitute an alternative to the obligatory major that USF students declare before graduation. The original program was strong in the humanities (languages, literature, composition (language), philosophy, theology) but had a weaker offering in mathematics and the natural sciences. Students who fulfilled the requirements of the SII were awarded a Certificate in the Liberal Arts, by which USF and the SII certified that the student had achieved USF's core education requirements toward an undergraduate degree.

== Controversies ==
For its first quarter-century, the SII was a lightning rod of controversy within the university and among more progressive members of the Roman Catholic Church. Some members of the university criticized what one scholar called a "parti pris" approach to education with a narrow Catholic – mostly papal – perspective.

Faculty of the SII clashed with members and friends of USF's Department of Theology who objected to SII's practice of hiring theology professors for SII classes rather than relying upon the Department of Theology to provide these faculty. The SII rejected interference by the Department of Theology because it wanted to maintain a strong adherence to theological positions loyal to the current Pope and Magisterium of the Roman Catholic Church, especially on moral matters such as contraception, abortion, and homosexuality. Eventually the differences between the SII and the Department of Theology were symbolized by their contrasting responses to Ex Corde Ecclesiae issued by Pope John Paul II in 1990. The papal document called for a mandatum to be signed by professors of Catholic doctrine as a testament to the instructor's orthodoxy. The SII faculty signed the mandatum as a self-defining act. But USF and the Department of Theology resisted signing the mandatum, as did theologians in many other U.S. Catholic universities in a controversy that continued for over a decade.

Various events also sparked debate, with the SII's continued existence frequently called into question. In 1978, the SII hosted a symposium to commemorate the tenth anniversary of the promulgation of Humanae Vitae, the encyclical by Pope Paul VI condemning contraception. British journalist Malcolm Muggeridge delivered the keynote address, arguing that contraception is a lethal threat to Christian civilization. Another speaker, Fr. Gerald Coleman, dean of St. Patrick's Seminary, Menlo Park, California, delivered a paper for the minority at the symposium, expressing opposition to the keynote address and arguing for "allowing theological dissent and reception of communion by couples practicing artificial birth control."

In 1987, USF's campus minister denied access on Sundays for the SII's popular but controversial chaplain, Fr. Cornelius M. Buckley, to celebrate Mass, alleging that his liturgies fostered a cult-like following. Critics of the decision expressed regret at the loss of variety in styles of liturgical worship at USF caused by the campus minister's ruling. Some described Buckley's liturgical approach as more "simple" and "solemn."

Also in 1987, the SII faced its greatest crisis to date when the university president fired Fr. Fessio from his position as the SII's first director, over a disagreement concerning the use of a $1 million gift that San Francisco benefactress, Mrs. Louise Davies, gave to the SII. Fr. Robert Maloney, S.J., succeeded Fessio as director. Fessio continued to teach theology at USF and in the SII until 1992, when he resigned to spend more time developing Ignatius Press, the lay-run publishing house he directs in San Francisco.

Controversy again erupted in 1988 when the USF student government required that an SII student who was the editor-in-chief of the university's award-winning newspaper, the San Francisco Foghorn, accept a co-editorship arrangement in the interests of journalistic objectivity.

Additional controversies took place during the term of the SII's third director, John Galten. Under his watch the SII's faculty had to design a course in Asian philosophy to satisfy pressure from the university to incorporate non-western sources into the curriculum. A renewed clash was brought on by the transfer of the SII's chaplain, C.M. Buckley, away from San Francisco. Buckley, a published historian and translator with decades of university teaching experience, assigned as chaplain for a Catholic hospital in Duarte, California, where Fessio would be assigned by his Jesuit provincial superior some years later.

Amidst these controversies, some SII faculty members and alumni expressed in print that their experience at USF had been enriched by their participation in the SII's intellectual community.

== Removal of John Galten as Director ==
USF totally revamped the SII in 2001, when the new university president, Jesuit Fr. Stephen A. Privett, dismissed Director John Galten and Associate Director John Hamlon, citing cost savings and describing the two as not qualified to head an academic program, despite their years in the position. Most of the SII's faculty resigned in protest. The affair received national media coverage. Conservative leaders expressed support for Galten, including former U.S. Secretary of Education William J. Bennett and Michael Novak of the American Enterprise Institute, in a full-page ad published in the San Francisco Chronicle and elsewhere. In a memo published nationally, Privett responded to criticism of his decision, stating that the replacement of the SII's leadership would promote "synergies between St. Ignatius Institute and other university programs" and create "efficiencies by consolidating resources." He held a conference with students to assure them that the SII would continue as a Great Books curriculum with qualified instructors.

Within the Catholic Church, the controversy reached Pope John Paul II through a letter of support for the SII signed by Fessio's former PhD thesis advisor Cardinal Joseph Ratzinger (prefect of the Congregation for the Doctrine of the Faith who became Pope Benedict XVI) and by Cardinal Christoph Schönborn (archbishop of Vienna and editor of the Catechism of the Catholic Church). Reportedly the letter was personally approved by the pope. Nevertheless, at the pope's behest, an official letter from the Vatican Congregation for Catholic Education supported the authority of the then-Archbishop William Levada to resolve tensions between the SII and USF. The archbishop chose not to reverse the firings.

== Current Institute ==
SII now exists as a living-learning community at USF. Students live together in one of the residence halls, participate in monthly community events, and take a humanities-based curriculum designed to introduce them to topics and texts outside their primary fields of study. The current SII bears little resemblance to the original program.

== Offspring ==
The ousting of Director John Galten and his faculty at the SII spawned offspring institutions. Galten, with the assistance of Fessio and his Ignatius Press, launched Campion College of San Francisco in 2002, located just off the USF campus. Friends and alumni of SII also organized a sister college, Campion College of Washington, DC, but it never began operations.

Campion was a two-year Great Books program that effectively transplanted the SII reading list and curriculum, under Galten's watch, to a new junior college granting Associate of Arts degrees to its graduates. Campion operated for two years, graduating fourteen students, before financial constraints forced its closure.

Fessio's participation in the founding of Campion College was viewed by USF authorities and by the Society of Jesus as a direct challenge. Consequently, Fessio's superiors ordered him to have no contact with the new school, and they transferred Fessio to the same Duarte, Calif., hospital where Buckley was chaplain. Fessio later resurfaced as founding chancellor and, later, provost of Ave Maria University, a new Catholic university launched in Naples, Florida, by the mercurial billionaire Thomas S. Monaghan, founder of the Domino's Pizza chain. There Fessio would also run into difficulties with university authorities who stated that they had "irreconcilable differences" with Fessio "over administrative policies and procedures," and who – according to Fessio – objected to his traditional approach to liturgical worship. Fessio was dismissed from his post, but then rehired to a lesser position at the university.

== Notable alumni ==
- Mary Beth Bonacci, internationally known speaker and columnist
- Delia Gallagher, journalist (Rome-based), Senior Editor, Inside the Vatican, CNN Faith and Values Correspondent
- Tom Hoopes, executive editor, National Catholic Register; co-editor, Faith and Family Magazine
- Francis J. Kelly, managing director and head of Government Affairs, Americas, Deutsche Bank; writer for Presidents Ronald Reagan and George H. W. Bush
- Jason Kenney, Premier of Alberta, Canada
- The late Prince Robert and the late Prince Edouard-Xavier de Lobkowicz de Bourbon-Parma, Lieutenants in the French Army, members of Sovereign Military Order of Malta, and grandnephews of the last Habsburg rulers of Austria and Hungary
- His Excellency, The Most Reverend Steven Joseph Lopes, Roman Catholic bishop of the Personal Ordinariate of the Chair of Saint Peter, a community for former Anglican clergy and laypeople within the Catholic Church
- Ed McFadden, Secretary of Communications for Archdiocese of Washington, DC; advisor to Senator Fred Thompson; advisor to U.S. Attorney General John Ashcroft; senior editor, Reader's Digest
- George Neumayr, author, The Political Pope; editor, Catholic World Report; executive editor, American Spectator; contributor, National Review; contributor, California Political Review; editor, San Francisco Faith; Hoover Institution Media Fellow
- John Norton, journalist, editor of Our Sunday Visitor, reporter for the Rome bureau of Catholic News Service and international news anchor for Vatican Radio
- Adrian Walker, theologian, editor of Communio International Catholic Review, English translator of books by Pope Benedict XVI

== Notable faculty and guest lecturers ==
- The Rev. Louis Bouyer, C.O., theologian of the French Oratory
- Cornelius M. Buckley, SJ, historian, chaplain
- Dr. William Coulson, psychologist, proponent of ethnopsychology, colleague but eventual opponent of pioneering psychologists Abraham Maslow and Carl Rogers
- Raymond Dennehy, Ph.D., philosopher and anti-abortionist; author of Reason and Dignity (1981) and Anti-Abortionist at Large: How to Argue Intelligently about Abortion and Live to Tell About It (2002)
- Anne Prah-Perochon, Ph.D., founder and Editor-in-Chief, France Today
- Mother Teresa of Calcutta
- Hans Urs Von Balthasar, Swiss theologian
