= John a. powell =

American law professor and academic

john a. powell
- Born: John A. Powell; May 27, 1947 (age 79); Detroit, Michigan, U.S.
- Occupation: Law professor

Academic background
- Education: University of California, Berkeley (JD); Stanford University (BA)

John a. powell (born May 27, 1947) is an American law professor. He leads the UC Berkeley Othering & Belonging Institute (formerly known as Haas Institute for a Fair and Inclusive Society) and holds the Robert D. Haas Chancellor's Chair in Equity and Inclusion, Professor of Law and Professor of African American Studies and Ethnic Studies at the University of California, Berkeley School of Law. Powell spells his name in lowercase based on the idea that we should be "part of the universe, not over it, as capitals signify". Since 2026, he is a Richard von Weizsäcker Fellow at the Robert Bosch Academy.

== Life ==
Powell was born on May 27, 1947 in Detroit, Michigan. He was raised by his mother and father, both sharecroppers from the South. His father was a Christian minister.

Powell was previously the executive director of the Kirwan Institute for the Study of Race and Ethnicity at Ohio State University. He also taught civil rights law, property law and jurisprudence and held the Earl R. Larson Chair of Civil Rights and Civil Liberties Law at the University of Minnesota Law School.

He was the founder and former executive director of the Institute on Race and Poverty (IRP), which is located at the University of Minnesota Law School. He has taught at Columbia University School of Law, Harvard Law School, University of Miami School of Law, American University and the University of San Francisco School of Law.

== Education ==
Powell earned a J.D. from the University of California, Berkeley School of Law and a B.A. from Stanford University. He then became an attorney with the Seattle Public Defender's Office. In 1977, powell received an International Human Rights Fellowship from the University of Minnesota to work in Africa, where he served as a consultant to the government of Mozambique. Between 1987 and 1993, he worked as a national legal director of the American Civil Liberties Union.

He is a co-founder of the Poverty and Race Research Action Council (PRRAC) and serves on the boards of several national organizations including Tides and the McKnight Foundation.

== Views ==
Powell has proposed that white identity was forged in the 17th century in order to police social hierarchy in the colonies of pre-independence America.

== Publications ==
- The Rights of Racial Minorities: The Basic ACLU Guide to Racial Minority Rights, 2nd ed. (with L. McDonald). The American Civil Liberties Union, 1993.
- The Rights of Racial Minorities: The Basic ACLU Guide to Racial Minority Rights-Young People's Version (With L.McDonald). American Civil Liberties Union, 1998. ISBN 9780606137416
- In Pursuit of a Dream Deferred: Linking Housing and Education Policies (with Gavin Kearney and Vina Kay). New York:Peter Lang Publishing, 2001. ISBN 9780820439433
- Racing to Justice: Transforming Our Conceptions of Self and Other to Build an Inclusive Society. Indiana University Press. 2012. ISBN 978-0-253-00629-5.
