= John Nobili =

Italian priest (1812–1856)

John Nobili S.J.

1st President of Santa Clara University
- In office 1851–1856
- Succeeded by: Nicholas Congiato, S.J.

Personal details
- Born: 28 April 1812 Rome
- Died: 1 March 1856 (aged 43) Santa Clara, California
- Education: Roman College
- Profession: Jesuit priest

John Nobili SJ, born Giovanni Pietro Antonio Nobili, (28 April 1812 – 1 March 1856) was an Italian priest of the Society of Jesus. He was a missionary in the Oregon Territory and later founded Santa Clara College in California, United States.

Born in Rome in 1812, and educated at the Roman College. Nobili entered the Society of Jesus in 1828 and taught humanities in Jesuit colleges in Italy, notably the Pontifical Gregorian University in Rome. He was ordained a priest in 1843. Nobili was later assigned to do missionary work in North America and was assigned to accompany Father Pierre-Jean De Smet, S.J. in his missionary work in the Oregon Territory. Nobili's missionary work took him amongst the many Native American tribes in the territory, where he learned the tribes' languages and customs.

Nobili stayed in the Oregon Territory until 1849, when he was ordered to go to California. Joined by Father Michael Accolti, S.J., Nobili first travelled to San Francisco, then onto San Jose. Upon his arrival in San Jose, Archbishop Joseph Alemany appointed him the pastor of Mission Santa Clara, then recently acquired from the Franciscans. He continued his missionary work in part, ministering to the sick and dying during a cholera epidemic in 1850.

As part of his pastoral work, Nobili established a preparatory school in 1851 on the mission's premises. In 1853 the school began offering advanced courses, and its name was changed to Santa Clara College. During Nobili's tenure as president, a new academic building and dormitory (1854), a gymnasium (1855), and a small Gothic chapel (1856) were constructed. According to the 1854-55 Catalogue, he also directed the purchase of a "new and complete philosophical and chemical apparatus, comprising all the recent improvements" previously unavailable in California. The College would later grow into present-day Santa Clara University.

While overseeing the construction of the chapel in January 1856, Nobili stepped on a nail. He died of Tetanus shortly thereafter in Santa Clara on the first day of March. Archbishop Alemany presided over his funeral Mass and laid his body to rest near the altar of the unfinished chapel.

Nobili Avenue in Santa Clara and the Nobili Residence Hall at Santa Clara University are named in his honour.

== External sources ==
- University of Santa Clara (1912). University of Santa Clara. University of Santa Clara: a history from the founding of Santa Clara Mission in 1777 to the beginning of the University in 1912. Harvard College Library: University Press. p. 22.
- Biography at the Dictionary of Canadian Biography Online
