= Eva Paterson =

American activist and lawyer

- Born: Eva Peterson; June 16, 1949 (age 77)
- Education: Northwestern University; University of California, Berkeley, School of Law
- Occupations: Public Interest Lawyer, Civil Rights Advocate
- Employer: Equal Justice Society
- Title: President, Co-Founder
- Website: Equal Justice Society

Eva Jefferson Paterson (born 16 June 1949) is the president and founder of the Equal Justice Society, a national legal organization focused on civil rights and anti-discrimination.

== Biography ==
=== Early life and education ===
Eva Paterson grew up in a military family in France, England, and Mascoutah, in southern Illinois. In high school, she traveled the state giving Martin Luther King's “I Have a Dream” speech.” She completed her undergraduate studies at Northwestern University, where she was the school's first African American student government president.

As a 20-year-old student leader at a time of turmoil, Paterson was catapulted into the national spotlight when she debated then Vice President Spiro Agnew on live television. Dubbed the “peaceful warrior” for fostering non-violent protest in the aftermath of the 1970 shooting of student demonstrators at Kent State University, she was named one of Mademoiselle's “Ten Young Women of the Year,” featured on the covers of Ebony and Jet, and called to testify before Congress.

Paterson graduated from UC Berkeley's Boalt Hall School of Law and was admitted to the California State Bar in 1975.

=== Career ===
After graduating from law school, Paterson worked for the Legal Aid Society of Alameda County and co-founded A Safe Place, a shelter for battered women in Oakland, California.

She then worked at the Lawyers' Committee for Civil Rights for 23 years, and served as its executive director for 13 years; before founding the Equal Justice Society.

Paterson led the organization's work providing free legal services to low-income individuals, litigating class action civil rights cases, and advocating for social justice. At the Lawyers’ Committee, she was part of a broad coalition that filed the groundbreaking anti-discrimination suit against race and gender discrimination by the San Francisco Fire Department. That lawsuit successfully desegregated the department, winning new opportunities for women and minority firefighters.

Paterson co-founded and chaired the California Coalition for Civil Rights for 18 years, and was a leading spokesperson in the campaigns against Proposition 187 and Proposition 209 and numerous other statewide campaigns against the death penalty, juvenile incarceration and discrimination against lesbians and gay men.

She served as Vice President of the ACLU National Board for eight years, and chaired the boards of Equal Rights Advocates and the San Francisco Bar Association. Paterson has received more than 50 awards, including the Fay Stender Award from the California Women Lawyers, Woman of the Year from the Black Leadership Forum, the Earl Warren Civil Liberties Award from the ACLU of Northern California, and the Alumni Award of Merit from Northwestern University where she received her B.A. in political science.

A self-described beneficiary of affirmative action, Paterson is passionate in support of equal educational opportunities. She co-authored several landmark lawsuits in support of affirmative action: the federal lawsuit challenging California's Proposition 209, the successful litigation against U.C. Berkeley's admissions policy limiting access to students of color and an amicus brief in Grutter v. Bollinger, in which the U.S. Supreme Court upheld the race-conscious admissions policy at the University of Michigan Law School.

Paterson and the Equal Justice Society played a pivotal role in the broad coalition that decisively defeated Ward Connerly's California Proposition 54 (2003). The measure would have banned the collection of racial and ethnic data by any state agency, thus making it virtually impossible to track and document race discrimination or to bring civil rights suits to court. She was a leading spokesperson for the “No on 54″ Campaign.

Paterson has delivered commencement addresses on college campuses across the nation, and she has served as an adjunct professor at the University of San Francisco School of Law and at University of California, Hastings College of the Law.

Paterson received an honorary Doctor of Laws from Northwestern University on June 13, 2022. Paterson graduated in 1971 from Northwestern with a B.A. in political science and was elected the first African American student body president.
