= Aloysius Varsi =

President of Santa Clara University (1830–1900)

Aloysius Masnata S.J.
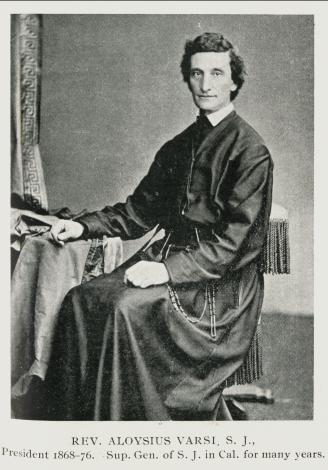
- Aloysius Varsi, SJ as President of Santa Clara College

6th President of Santa Clara University
- In office 1868–1876
- Preceded by: Aloysius Masnata, S.J.
- Succeeded by: Aloysius Brunengo, S.J.

Personal details
- Born: March 9, 1830 Cagliari, Sardinia
- Died: November 27, 1900 (aged 70) Santa Clara, California
- Education: University of Paris
- Profession: Jesuit priest

Rev. Aloysius Varsi, SJ, (9 March 1830 – 27 November 1900) was an American educator and college president.

Varsi was born in Cagliari, Sardinia, and entered the Society of Jesus, an order of the Roman Catholic Church, on May 2, 1845. He was educated at St. Teresa's College in Cagliari, and he went to Turin, Toulouse and Vals for advanced training in literature and philosophy. Shortly afterward, he continued studies of physics and higher mathematics at the University of Paris.

In 1861, Varsi sailed to the United States and studied theology in Boston, Massachusetts, where he also taught physics and chemistry. He moved to California in 1865 and took up a professorship in physics at Santa Clara College; two years thereafter he was assigned the presidency (1868–1876). During his tenure, the original chapel was destroyed in an earthquake, and a large new theatre building, Exhibition Hall, replaced the old edifice.

After 1876, Varsi was assigned to St. Ignatius College in San Francisco, where he became the superior of the California Mission, (similar to a province), and constructed the first college buildings, including St. Ignatius Church, many of which were destroyed in the 1906 earthquake. He died in San Francisco in 1900 making front-page news all around the world.

== Sources ==
- University of Santa Clara. University of Santa Clara: a history from the founding of Santa Clara Mission in 1777 to the beginning of the University in 1912 (page 24)
- Gerald McKevitt, S.J. The University of Santa Clara: A History, 1851-1977 (pages 93–95) ISBN 9780804710244
- Salvatore John LaGumina. The Italian American experience: an encyclopedia (page 285) ISBN 9780815307136
- Santa Clara College (corporate authorship). Souvenir of Santa Clara College. Santa Clara, CA: University Press, 1901 (page 20)
