= Nicholas Congiato =

2nd President of Santa Clara University
- In office 1856–1857
- Preceded by: John Nobili
- Succeeded by: Felix Cicaterri

Personal details
- Born: September 14, 1816; Cagliari, Sardinia, Italy
- Died: May 10, 1897 (aged 80); Los Gatos, California, US
- Profession: Jesuit priest

Nicholas Congiato (14 September 1816 – 10 May 1897) was an Italian-born Jesuit priest. He was born in Cagliari, Sardinia and entered the Society of Jesus, an order of the Roman Catholic Church, when he was fourteen years of age. After his initial education, he went to Turin, Italy, for advanced studies in philosophy. Congiato then became Vice-President of the College of Nobles in Turin and held a similar position at the Jesuit College in Fribourg, a city in Switzerland.

In 1847, he was sent to the United States, where he led St. Joseph's College in Bardstown, Kentucky, ministered to Indian missions in the Rocky Mountains, and, in 1854, came to California to take over as Superior General of the Jesuit Missions of California and Oregon.

Congiato became the second president of two different Jesuit colleges in the San Francisco Bay Area. Upon the death of John Nobili in 1856, he assumed the presidency of Santa Clara College. His tenure in Santa Clara, (1856–1858), saw the construction of the first chapel, renovations of the theatre and gymnasium, and the establishment of the Philhistorian and Philalethic Debating Societies. During that time, a swimming pond was also added. Afterwards, Congiato succeeded Anthony Maraschi as president of Saint Ignatius College in San Francisco in 1862, serving two separate terms and presiding over Saint Ignatius' expansion in downtown San Francisco.

After 1858, Congiato remained the Superior of the Oregon Missions, and twice (1865–1868 and 1883–1888) was appointed Superior of the Mission of California. For nearly twenty years he served as the pastor of St. Joseph's Church in San Jose, California and constructed the Jesuit Novitiate at Los Gatos, where he died in 1897.
