= University of San Francisco Maritime Law Journal =

- Discipline: Maritime law
- Language: English

Publication details
- History: 1989-present
- Publisher: University of San Francisco School of Law (United States)
- Frequency: Biannual

Standard abbreviations
- Bluebook: U.S.F. Mar. L.J.
- ISO 4: Univ. San Franc. Marit. Law J.

Indexing
- ISSN: 1061-3331

Links
- Journal homepage

The University of San Francisco Maritime Law Journal is a biannual law review that includes an annual survey of United States Court of Appeals for the Ninth Circuit cases pertaining to admiralty and maritime law.

== Overview ==
The journal was established in 1989 and sponsors two teams each spring to compete in the Judge John R. Brown National Admiralty Moot Court Competition. In 1999 and 2007, the journal hosted the competition at the Ninth Circuit Court of Appeals in San Francisco.

== Articles ==
The journal has been cited by numerous US state and federal courts. The US Supreme Court has also cited the journal, most recently in Chandris, Inc. v. Latsis.
