= Hayley Cleary =

Criminologist and psychologist

- Occupations: Associate Professor of Criminal Justice and Psychology
- Awards: Louise Kidder Early Career Award; PeRQ Award

Academic background
- Education: University of Virginia; Georgetown University

Hayley Cleary is a criminologist and psychologist known for her research on juveniles in the criminal justice system. She is an associate professor of Criminal Justice and Public Policy at Virginia Commonwealth University in the L. Douglass Wilder School of Government and Public Affairs. Cleary's research mainly examines the behavior of adolescents in interrogation settings and strives to improve policy within the criminal justice system.

== Education ==
Cleary earned her bachelor's degree in psychology and Russian studies from the University of Virginia in Charlottesville, Virginia. She continued her education by earning a Master's of Public Policy and a PhD in developmental psychology from Georgetown University in Washington, D.C. She completed a thesis titled "High School Exit Exams and Adolescent Delinquency," which was published in 2007 to fulfill the requirements for her master's degree. Cleary completed her dissertation in 2010 under the supervision of Dr. Jennifer L. Woolard. Her dissertation titled, "An Observational Study of Interview Characteristics and Miranda in Juvenile Interrogations," highlights the importance of Miranda Rights for juveniles in an interrogation setting.

== Career ==
Cleary is currently employed at Virginia Commonwealth University (VCU) in the L. Douglass Wilder School of Government and Public Affairs in Richmond, Virginia, where she has taught criminal justice and public policy for the last 13 years. She started as an assistant professor of psychology in May 2011, where she taught for a year, before becoming an assistant professor of criminal justice in June 2012. In 2019, she was promoted to associate professor of criminal justice.

In her years of work, Cleary has become an acclaimed researcher, receiving the Louise Kidder Early Career Award in 2018 for her research contributions to the Society for the Psychological Study of Social Issues. Cleary has also received VCU's Presidential Research Quest Fund (PeRQ) for her research proposal concerning sex offender registry policies and adolescents.

In addition to her accolades, Cleary has been sought as an expert witness in cases involving adolescents and provided supportive testimonies for evidence-based legislature. Cleary has been invited several times to the Federal Bureau of Investigation (FBI) National Academy and Virginia General Assembly to share her work with law enforcement. She has also appeared on several podcasts, including NPR's All Things Considered, to discuss her research on juvenile interrogations.

== Research ==
In addition to teaching, Cleary conducts research and has over 30 published works. Her research is focused on juveniles in the criminal justice system, with her foundation in police interrogations involving adolescents. Cleary's research aims to advance the understanding of the cause and effects of police interrogations. Her main goal is to improve public policy and influence law enforcement to provide justice. Cleary uses developmental psychological theory in her research about police interrogations, in which she covers constructs such as race/ethnicity, age, and trauma. Some of her published works are focused on areas such as parents' knowledge about Miranda rights and how it could affect their children, the process of criminal investigation procedures and observation of police behavior, and observation of youths in correctional facilities from different perspectives. Cleary receives funding from the National Science Foundation (NSF) as well as the Annie E. Casey Foundation to conduct her research. In 2020, she was awarded $235,253.00 from the NSF for a collaborative project with Dr. Cynthia Najdowski. Their work, "Relations between peer influence, perceived costs versus benefits, and sexual offending among adolescents aware of sex offender registration risk," was published in 2023. Cleary has had her work featured in the New York Times and The New Yorker. Her study on police interviewing techniques of juvenile suspects was featured in the New York Times article, "In Interrogations, Teenagers Are Too Young to Know Better," where she states, "if kids are making these poor decisions because their development is not complete, then to penalize them with long-term legal consequences is unfair".
