= Richard Leo =

Richard A. Leo
- Born: Richard Angelo Leo
- Known for: Research on police interrogations and false confessions

Academic background
- Education: University of California, Berkeley
- Thesis: Police Interrogation in America: A Study of Violence, Civility and Social Change (1994)
- Doctoral advisor: Jerome Skolnick

Academic work
- Discipline: Law professor
- Sub-discipline: Criminal law
- Institutions: University of San Francisco School of Law

Richard A. Leo is the Hamill Family Professor of Law and Psychology at the University of San Francisco School of Law, and a Fellow in the Institute for Legal Research at the University of California, Berkeley School of Law. He previously taught at the University of Colorado Boulder from 1994 to 1997 and at the University of California, Irvine from 1997 to 2006. He is known for his research on police interrogation practices, false confessions, and wrongful convictions. He was elected as a Guggenheim fellow in 2011 and was a fellow of the Center for the Advanced Study in the Behavioral Sciences from 2014 to 2015.
