= Anthony Maraschi =

The Reverend Anthony Maraschi S.J.
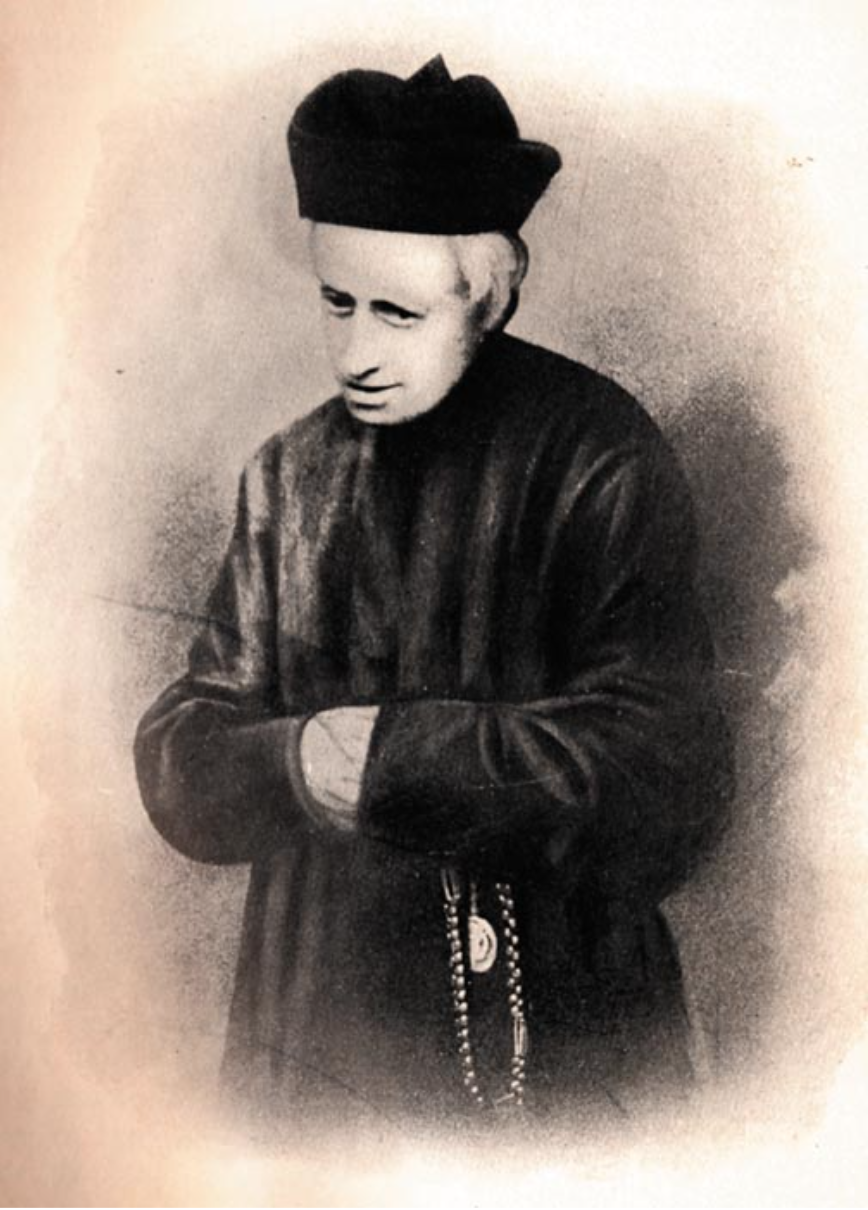

Orders
- Ordination: 1849

Personal details
- Born: 1820 Piedmont, Kingdom of Sardinia
- Died: 1897 (aged 76–77) San Francisco, California
- Denomination: Roman Catholic
- Education: Jesuit novitiate of Chieti; Georgetown University

The Reverend Anthony Maraschi, S.J. (1820 - 1897) was an Italian-born priest of the Society of Jesus. He was a founder of the University of San Francisco and Saint Ignatius College Preparatory as well as the first pastor of Saint Ignatius Church in San Francisco, California.

== Biography ==
Born in Piedmont, Italy, in 1820, Maraschi entered the Society of Jesus in Chieti. He began his scholastic career in Nice and was ordained a priest there in 1849. Maraschi left for the United States soon thereafter, and he completed a theology degree at Georgetown University before becoming a member of its faculty. Maraschi was also assigned to teach at the College of the Holy Cross in Worcester, Massachusetts, and Loyola College in Baltimore, Maryland.

In 1854, Maraschi left for San Francisco. Upon arrival, he served as an assistant pastor for both the parishes of St. Francis of Assisi and St. Patrick's while planning the establishment of a Jesuit church and school in the city. With the approval of Archbishop Joseph Alemany and the assistance of fellow Jesuits Michael Accolti, S.J. and Joseph Bixio, S.J., Saint Ignatius Church and College were established in 1855.

Saint Ignatius College was recognized by the Society of Jesus in 1859 and chartered by the State of California that same year. During the early years, Father Maraschi served as not only the church's pastor but also the college's president and treasurer, as well as an instructor in Latin, Greek, and Spanish. While he turned over the college's presidency to Nicholas Congiato, S.J. in 1862, Father Maraschi continued to supervise its financial affairs. He also continued to serve as Saint Ignatius Church's parish priest until a dispute with Archbishop Alemany in 1863 resulted in the church's parish status being rescinded.

Much later on, Saint Ignatius College would split into Saint Ignatius College and Saint Ignatius High School, with the former becoming the University of San Francisco and the latter becoming Saint Ignatius College Preparatory.

Anthony Maraschi died in San Francisco in 1897 and was buried in Mission Santa Clara's cemetery.

== Bust by Harriet G. Moore ==
Bust of Anthony Maraschi, S.J., adorned with USF's colors

A bronze bust of Maraschi resides on the campus and in the collection the University of San Francisco. The bust, sculpted by Harriet G. Moore and founded by Artworks Foundry, was cast in 1985. It is 22 1/2 x 21 x 13 in. and sits on a concrete base that is 47 x 47 1/2 x 47 1/2 in. The sculpture is signed and dated by Moore. It is a portrait bust of Maraschi and shows him wearing a priest's hat and robe. A plaque on the front of the base reads:

REV. ANTHONY JOSEPH MARASCHI, S. J.
(1820-1897)
FIRST PRESIDENT OF ST. IGNATIUS ACADEMY
1855-1859
AND
FIRST PRESIDENT OF ST. IGNATIUS COLLEGE
1859-1862
GIFT OF CONSTANTINE RAISES
SCULPTOR - HARRIET G. MOORE
1985

The sculpture was commissioned by a businessman named Constantine Raise. In 1993, it was surveyed as part of the Save Outdoor Sculpture! program. It was reported as being well maintained.
