= San Francisco Foghorn =

American student newspaper

- Type: Weekly student newspaper
- Format: Tabloid
- Owner: University of San Francisco
- Editor-in-chief: Jordan Premmer
- Founded: 1903
- Language: English
- Headquarters: University of San Francisco; San Francisco, CA, U.S.
- Circulation: 300
- Website: www.sffoghorn.com

The San Francisco Foghorn is the official student newspaper of the University of San Francisco.

== History ==
The newspaper was founded in 1903 as The Saint Ignatius. It changed its name to the San Francisco Foghorn in August 1928, and is one of the oldest collegiate newspapers on the West Coast. The Foghorn has continuously run weekly issues every semester. It has a readership of 5,000 and is distributed free on campus. The Foghorn Online Edition was started in 1995.

Among the notable USF alumni who wrote for the Foghorn were Pierre Salinger, former press secretary for President John F. Kennedy; Warren Hinckle, publisher of Ramparts Magazine; cartoonist Dan O'Neill; president of Bleacher Report Rory Brown; Kevin Starr, author, professor, and California state librarian emeritus.

== See also ==
- List of student newspapers
