= Saint Ignatius Church (San Francisco) =

Church building in San Francisco, California, United States

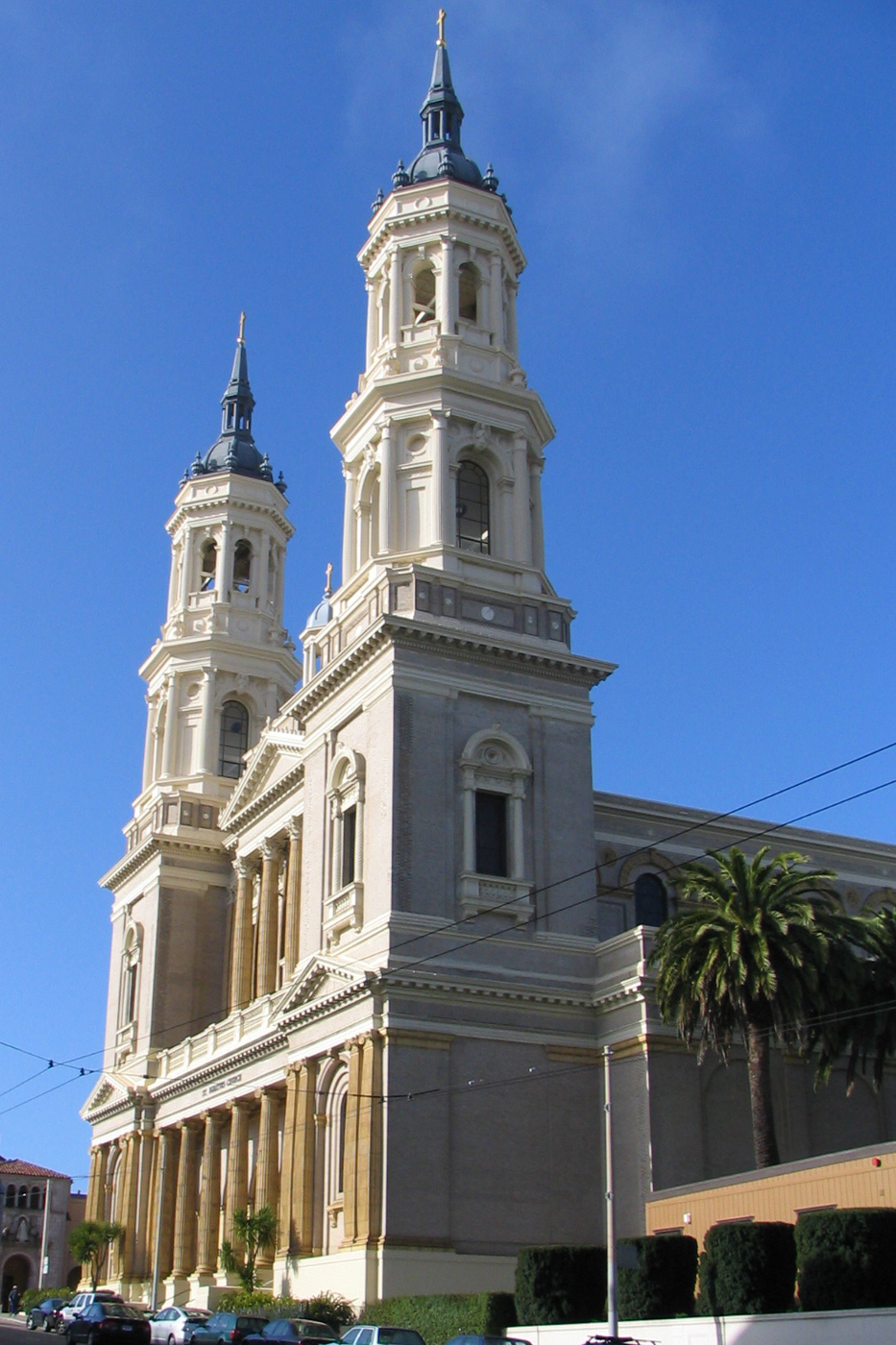
- Side view of St. Ignatius Church

- Location within San Francisco County Location within California Location within the United States

Religion
- Affiliation: Catholic Church
- Sect: Jesuit
- Diocese: Archdiocese of San Francisco
- Province: Archdiocese of San Francisco
- Ecclesiastical or organisational status: Parish
- Leadership: Archbishop of San Francisco Father Gregory R. Bonfiglio, S.J, Pastor

Location
- Location: San Francisco, California, United States
- Coordinates: 37.7756°N 122.4525°W

Architecture
- Architect: Charles J. I. Devlin
- Style: Italian Renaissance, Baroque
- Completed: August 2, 1914
- Direction of façade: South

Website
- St. Ignatius Church

Saint Ignatius Church is on the campus of the University of San Francisco (USF) in San Francisco, California. The church serves a parish of the Archdiocese of San Francisco and is the university's chapels. Saint Ignatius Church is staffed by priests of the Society of Jesus and is dedicated to the Society's founder, Ignatius of Loyola.

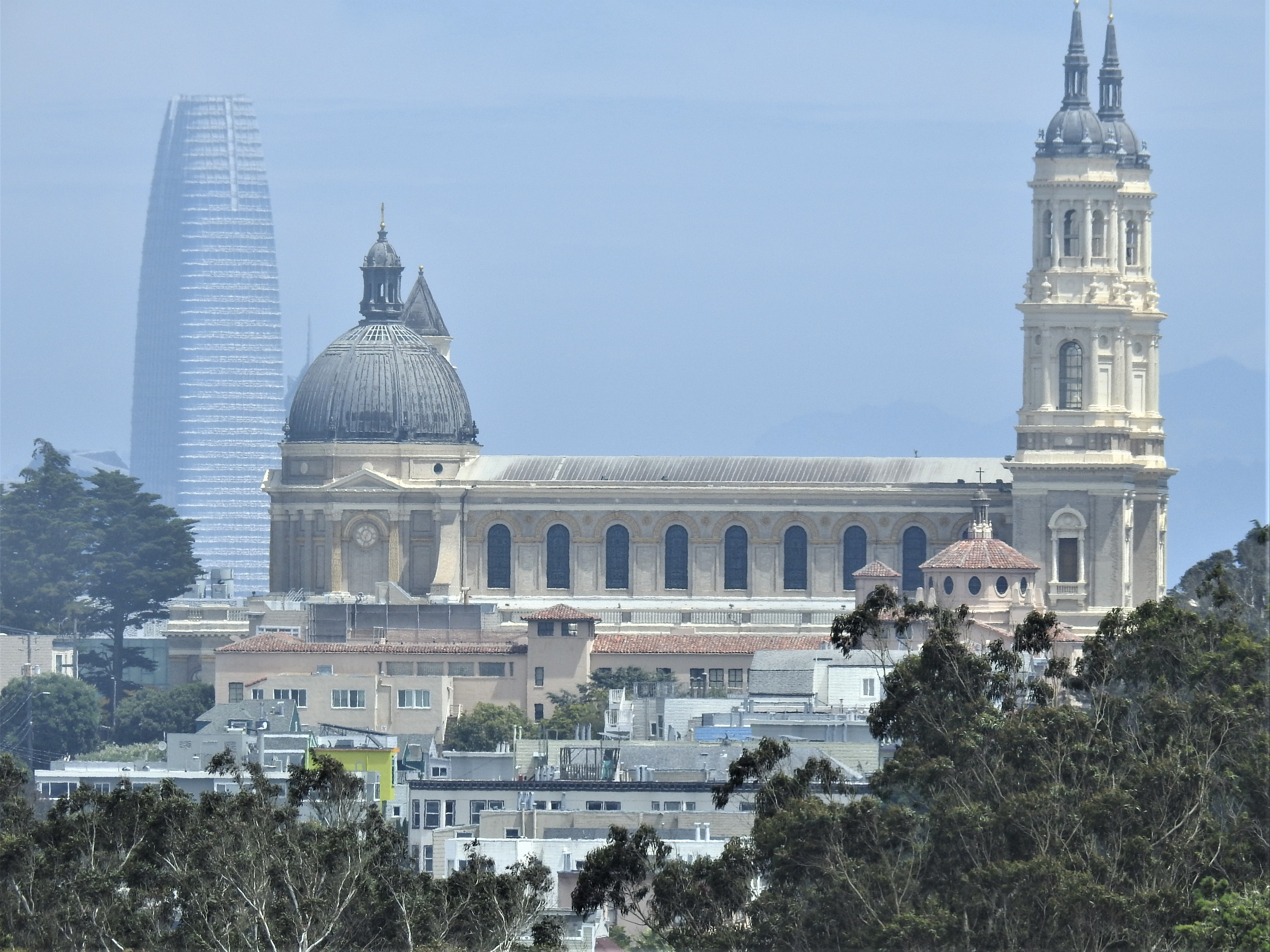
St Ignatius Church with Salesforce Tower in the backdrop, 2019

== Description ==
The present Saint Ignatius Church is the fifth such church to be built in San Francisco. Its history runs parallel to that of USF and St. Ignatius College Prep: the very first Saint Ignatius was built in 1855 as a small wood-frame church beside a schoolhouse that became Saint Ignatius Academy, USF's predecessor. The Market Street location was later rebuilt as a larger brick church which attracted many of San Francisco's Catholics away from established parishes. This led to a dispute between Saint Ignatius' first pastor, Father Anthony Maraschi, S.J. and Archbishop Joseph Alemany which resulted in the archdiocese stripping Saint Ignatius of its parish status in 1863.

The third Saint Ignatius Church was built, along with Saint Ignatius College, in 1880. The church and college moved from Market Street to the corner of Hayes Street and Van Ness Avenue, on a site now occupied by the Davies Symphony Hall. Compared to the first two churches, the third church could accommodate 4,000 worshippers and was arguably the grandest. However, the third church and college only lasted 25 years as both were destroyed in the 1906 earthquake and fire.

After the earthquake and fire, the college was hastily re-built on Hayes Street, a few miles west of old Van Ness Avenue site. A rambling wooden structure, the high school portion of the new complex was known as "The Shirt Factory" and the buildings would stay there for some two decades. However, the church itself was eventually re-built in 1912 two blocks north on Fulton Street at the corner of Parker Ave., and the fifth Saint Ignatius Church was dedicated in 1914. It has continued to serve as the university's chapel.

The present church's architecture is a mix of Italian Renaissance and Baroque elements, and its floorplan follows that of ancient Roman basilicas. Though Saint Ignatius Church survived the 1989 Loma Prieta earthquake unscathed, it was recently renovated and seismically reinforced. One of the city's largest churches, its location on a hilltop as well as its twin spires and dome makes it a prominent San Francisco landmark. Its backdrop, as viewed from the west, was the sky of San Francisco until Salesforce Tower was erected in 2018.

In 1994, the Archdiocese of San Francisco reinstated Saint Ignatius Parish's status as a parish serving the surrounding neighborhood. The Jesuit Provincial named Father Charles Gagan, S.J., long-time San Francisco native, as the third pastor in the church's history. He immediately began a campaign to replace the roof and fix the dome and cupola; he also commissions new carpeting and flooring for the aisles. Major repairs were also needed in the electrical and heating services.

In 2008, the congregation converted 4 of the alcoves within the church to an art gallery, called the Manresa Gallery. This space featured a number of Bay Area artists coming from a variety of religious and non religious backgrounds. In 2020, the former gallery became home to the Parish's In All Things Bookstore, a ministry of St. Ignatius Parish.

In 2023, St. Ignatius Church began its first major renovation in more than 30 years. Both spires and the bell tower are currently covered in scaffolding so the surface can be repaired and repainted. The incandescent lighting, much of it burned out, is being replaced by a subtle and environmentally friendly LED design, with the lights capable of changing colors. The 43 stained glass windows, which run the length of the church and depict Catholic saints, are being removed and sent to Chicago for refurbishing. The project will cost $22 million, all of it privately raised.

== See also ==
- List of Jesuit sites
