= Aloysius Brunengo =

American academic administrator

Aloysius Brunengo, S.J. was appointed Santa Clara University's seventh president (1876-1880) after the presidency of Aloysius Varsi.

== Bibliography ==
University of Santa Clara: A History from the Founding of Santa Clara Mission in 1777 to the Beginning of the University in 1912. University of Santa Clara Press. 1912.
