= Joseph W. Riordan =

Joseph W. Riordan, S.J. was appointed Santa Clara University's 11th president after the presidency of John Pinasco.
