= Novice master =

Instructor of the novices of an institute of consecrated life

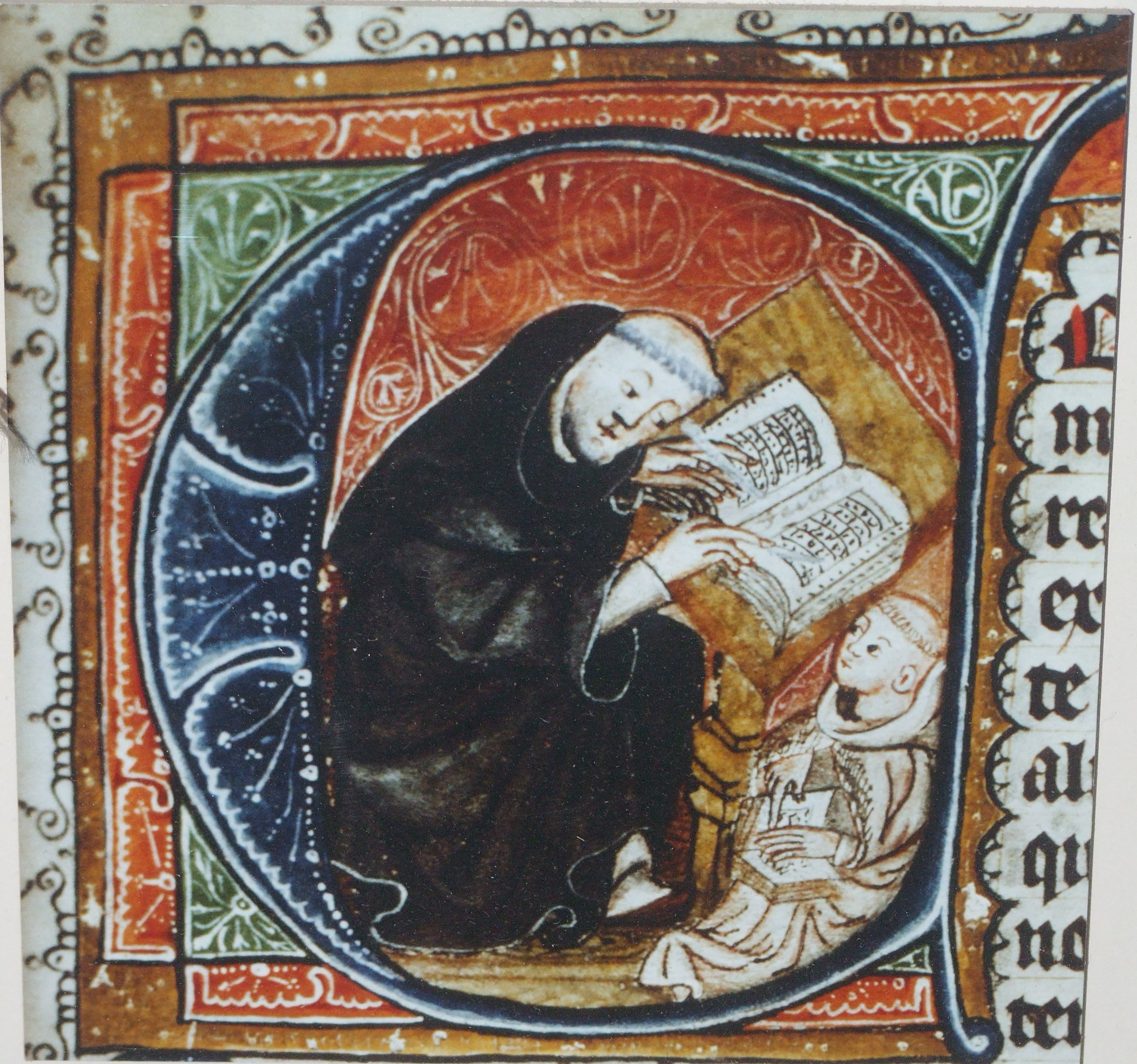
Saint Benedict teaches Caesarius of Heisterbach

In Western Christian churches, a novice master or master of novices (Latin: magister noviciorum), is a member of an institute of consecrated life who is responsible for the training and government of the novitiate in that institute. In religious institutes for women, the novice mistress, lat. Magistra noviciorum, is the equivalent. Sometimes the person in this position is called the novice director or director of novices.

The direction of the novices is reserved solely to the master of novices, under the authority of the major superiors. The master of novices must be a member of the institute; he must have taken perpetual vows and be legally appointed. The novice master is often assisted by a zelator (second or deputy novice master).

The novice master's duty is to see that the time devoted to the period of the novitiate be passed in prayer, meditation, and the development of character through a study of the life of Jesus Christ and the saints, church history, the vows and the constitution of the institute. Within the time of this probation, he must make reports about each novice to his superior regarding these matters. For this purpose, he is to be free from all other duties and offices. Prior to the admission to the investiture and later before simple and perpetual vows, the master of novices is asked for his assessment.

The Rule of Saint Benedict does not contain a separate chapter on the master of novices. In addition to general monastic maturity, the gift of winning souls is mentioned as a special qualification for the monk who takes care of the novices. A source of 1827 states that the novice master "should be a completely reliable, purely moral and true religious, who is able to familiarize the novices theoretically and practically with the purpose of the order and with the spirit of the statutes".
