= University of San Francisco =

Jesuit university in California, US

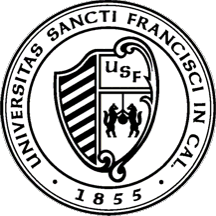
- Former names: St. Ignatius Academy (1855–1859); St. Ignatius College (1859–1930)
- Motto: Traditional: Pro Urbe et Universitate (Latin); For the City and University
- Motto in English: Current motto: "Change the World from Here"
- Type: Private university
- Established: 1855; 171 years ago
- Founder: Anthony Maraschi
- Accreditation: WSCUC
- Religious affiliation: Catholic Church (Jesuit)
- Academic affiliations: AJCU; ACCU; NAICU
- Endowment: $566 million (2024)
- President: Salvador Aceves
- Provost: Eileen Chia-Ching Fung
- Faculty: 1,107 (2022; 445 full-time, 662 part-time)
- Administrative staff: 977 (2022; 928 full-time, 49 part-time)
- Students: 8,913
- Undergraduates: 5,287
- Postgraduates: 3,504
- Location: San Francisco, California, United States; 37°46′46″N 122°27′07″W
- Campus: Large city, 55 acres (22 ha)
- Newspaper: San Francisco Foghorn
- Colors: Green; Gold
- Nickname: Dons
- Sporting affiliations: NCAA Division I – WCC
- Mascots: The Don, a Spanish nobleman
- Website: www.usfca.edu

The University of San Francisco (USF) is a private Jesuit university in San Francisco, California, United States. Founded in 1855, it has nearly 9,000 students pursuing undergraduate and graduate degrees in 59 major programs. In addition to its main campus in the Golden Gate area, it has satellite campuses in downtown San Francisco, Orange County, Sacramento, San Jose, and Santa Rosa.

== History ==
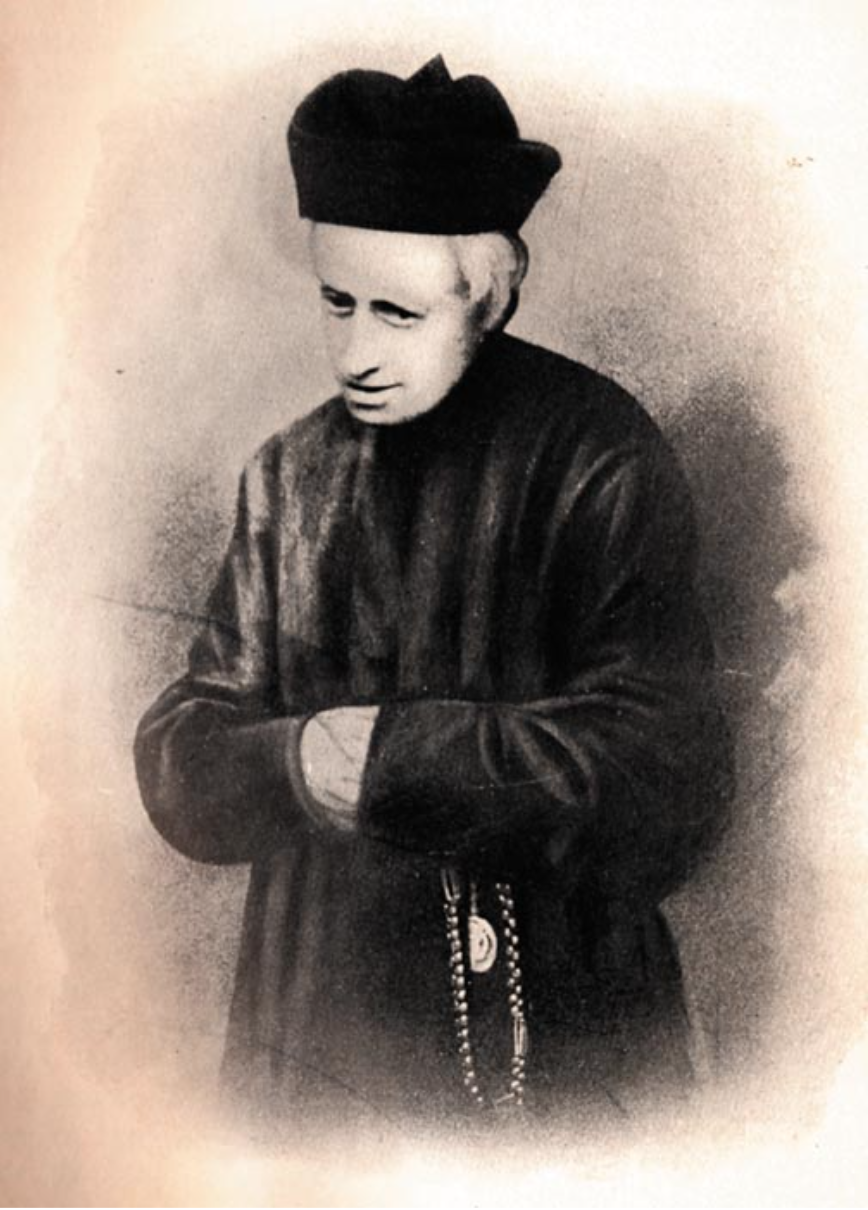
Anthony Maraschi

Founded by the Jesuits in 1855 as St. Ignatius Academy, USF started as a one-room schoolhouse along Market Street in what later became downtown San Francisco. Anthony Maraschi was the college's founder and first president, a professor, the college's treasurer, and the first pastor of St. Ignatius Church. Under Maraschi, St. Ignatius Academy received its charter to issue college degrees on April 30, 1859, from the State of California, signed by governor John B. Weller. In that year, the school changed its name to St. Ignatius College. The original curriculum included Greek, Spanish, Latin, English, French, Italian, algebra, arithmetic, history, geography, elocution, and bookkeeping.

A new building was constructed in 1862 to replace the first frame building. In June 1863, the university awarded its first Bachelor of Arts degree. In 1880, the college moved from Market Street to the corner of Hayes Street and Van Ness Avenue (currently occupied by the Davies Symphony Hall).

The third St. Ignatius College received moderate damage in the 1906 San Francisco earthquake, but it was completely destroyed in the ensuing fire. The campus moved to the corner of Hayes and Shrader streets. It occupied a hastily constructed structure known as the Shirt Factory for the next 21 years.

The college moved to its present site on Fulton Street in 1927, on the site of the former Masonic Cemetery. To celebrate its diamond jubilee in 1930, St. Ignatius College changed its name to the University of San Francisco. The change was sought by many alumni groups and by long-time San Francisco Mayor James Rolph Jr.

A male-only school for most of its history, USF became fully coeducational in 1964, though women started attending the evening programs in business and law as early as 1927. In 1969, the high school division, already separate from the university, moved to the western part of San Francisco and became St. Ignatius College Preparatory.

In 1978, the university acquired Lone Mountain College. October 15, 2005, marked the 150th anniversary of the university's founding. In 2012, The Daily Beast ranked USF the 3rd-"Most Crime-Rattled College" in the United States, using the college crime data which is kept by the U.S. Department of Education.

== Academics ==
59 majors are offered at USF within its one college and four schools:

- College of Arts and Sciences
- School of Education
- School of Law
- School of Management
- School of Nursing and Health Professions

=== Rankings ===
Academic rankings

National
- Forbes: 165
- U.S. News & World Report: 110
- Washington Monthly: 114

- USF was ranked tied for 110th overall by U.S. News & World Report in 2026.
- According to College Factual's 2026 Best Colleges list, USF was ranked 79th out of all four-year colleges and universities in the nation.
- Washington Monthly ranked USF 138th out of 391 national universities in 2021.
- Forbes ranked USF as a Top 100 private university in 2026.

=== Undergraduate admissions ===
In 2025, USF accepted 50.1% of undergraduate applicants. Admission standards are considered more selective, with competition among applicants being moderate to more intense. The average high school GPA for enrolled students was 3.61.

The university does not require submission of standardized test scores, as USF is a test-optional school. Among enrolled students, 12.39% submitted SAT scores and 2.61% submitted ACT scores. The average SAT composite score for enrolled students was 1300, with a range between the 25th percentile score of 1200 and the 75th percentile score of 1380. For ACT scores, the average composite score was 28, with a range between the 25th percentile score of 25 and the 75th percentile score of 30.

=== Global education ===
USF's Center for Global Education advises students on international programs sponsored by USF or external organizations and schools and facilitates the process. In sponsored study abroad programs, students pay USF's tuition and not the host program's tuition. USF has more than 89 sponsored study abroad programs in more than 40 countries.

== Campuses ==
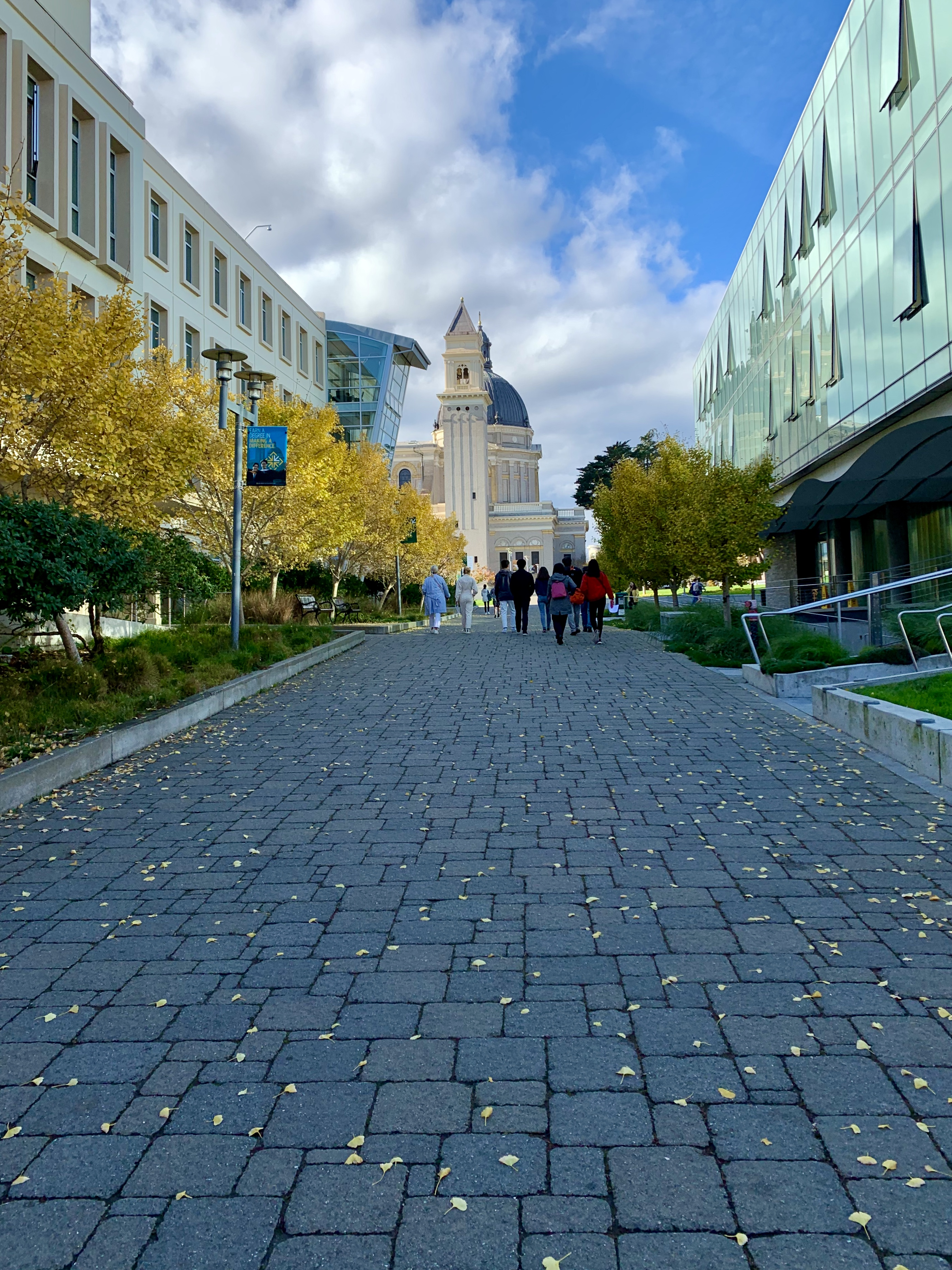
Path through USF's main campus

The university's 55-acre (22 ha) main campus is known as "The Hilltop." It's divided into Lone Mountain and lower campus, which are north and south of Turk Street respectively within a block of each other.

USF's Downtown San Francisco Campus was founded in the Folger Coffee Company Building at 101 Howard Street in 2012. 15 graduate programs in the School of Management and College of Arts and Sciences are offered here.

The Orange County Campus, founded in Orange in 1983, offers the Master of Science in Sport Management, the Master of Science in Nursing, and the Master of Public Health in Applied Epidemiology and Population Health Methods. The Sacramento Campus, founded in 1975, offers the Bachelor of Science in Nursing, the Master in Counseling with an emphasis in Marriage and Family Therapy, and the Masters in Teaching with a Teaching Credential. USF also offers programs on the campuses of San Jose City College and Santa Rosa Junior College.

== Organization and administration ==
USF is chartered as a non-profit organization and is governed by a privately appointed board of trustees, along with the university president, the university chancellor, the university provost and vice presidents, and the deans. The board, as of 2025, had 41 voting members who served three three-year terms. The board of trustees elects a president to serve as the general manager and chief executive of the university. The president, according to USF bylaws, is specifically responsible for articulating and advancing the Jesuit Catholic character of the university.

In 2025, USF's Board of Trustees elected Salvador Aceves as president, marking the first time in school history that a layperson had been elevated to the role.

== Student clubs and organizations ==
USF has over 100 clubs and organizations.

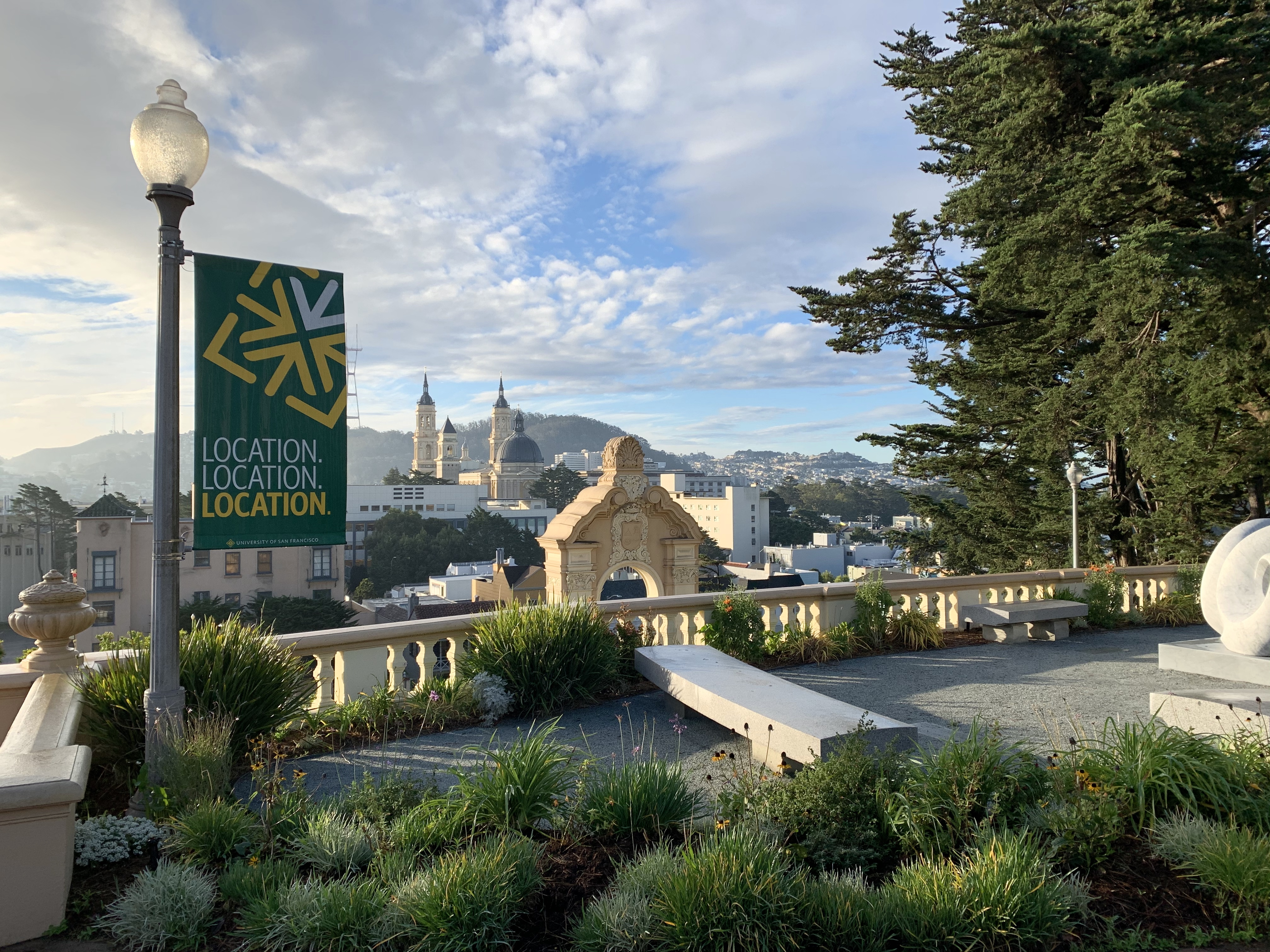
View from atop Lone Mountain to St. Ignatius Church on Main Campus

The Associated Students of the University of San Francisco (ASUSF) Senate is the student body governance organization responsible for organizing major campus events, voicing student concern, and reviewing the ASUSF budget.

=== Greek life ===
All social sororities and fraternities recognized by the university must participate in the Greek Council, which tends to the development of these organizations and their members. Chapters have some common mixers and socials, Thanksgiving potluck, Christmas clothing drive, Homecoming, and Greek Games.

=== Student-produced media ===
The San Francisco Foghorn is the official student weekly newspaper. From 1977, USF radio station KUSF broadcast online until 2011 when its license was sold to a Southern California-based classical radio station. KUSF had garnered international attention for its diverse musical programming, which varied from rock to hip hop to world music. It received numerous awards, including public service awards, for its weekly community service series. USF's other radio station, KDNZ, is student-run.

The University of San Francisco television station USFtv, founded in 2006 and entirely student-run, is broadcast on Channel 35 in the dormitories and around campus, with news, sports, and cultural programming. In 2008, USFtv students collaborated with Wyclef Jean to create a music video for his song "If I Was President". The Ignatian is USF's annual literary magazine.

=== Performing arts ===
USF has student clubs for the performing arts, including a theater group (College Players), improvisational team (Awkward Silence), choir (ASUSF Voices), USF Don Marching Band, contemporary mass ensemble, and a dance program that focuses on social justice.

The College Players, founded in 1863, is considered one of the oldest student-run theater groups in the United States. Their annual production of The Vagina Monologues gives all its proceeds to women's charities in the Bay Area, as of 2009.

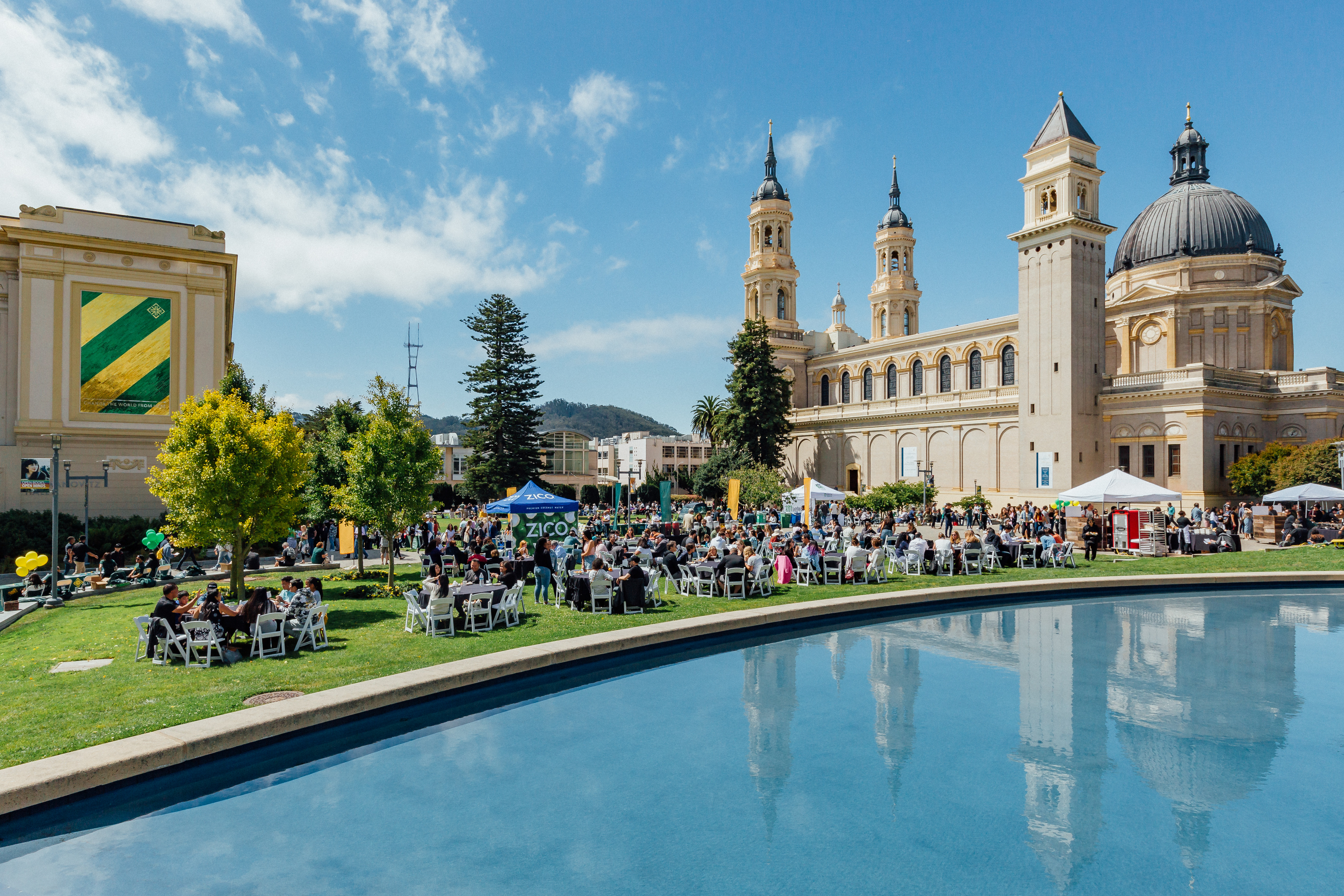
USF's lower campus, featuring St. Ignatius Church and Gleeson Plaza

ASUSF Voices, in collaboration with the Performing Arts Department, contains a variety of choral ensembles, including jazz and popular. The USF Contemporary Mass Ensemble (vocal and instrumental) are USF alumni who perform at Sunday Masses in St. Ignatius Church. The USF dance program is affiliated with the Performing Arts and Social Justice Major. Students can enroll in traditional and modern dance classes and participate in the USF Dance Ensemble under professional choreographers.

== Student body ==
Undergraduate demographics as of fall 2020
Race and ethnicity	Total
Asian	26%
White	24%
Hispanic	21%
Foreign national	12%
Other (Note: Other consists of Multiracial Americans & those who prefer to not say.)	11%
Black	6%
Economic diversity
Low-income (Note: The percentage of students who received an income-based federal Pell grant intended for low-income students.)	27%
Affluent (Note: The percentage of students who are a part of the American middle class at the bare minimum.)	73%

Notable students marked the early years of student diversity at USF. Chan Chung Wing, whose parents had immigrated from near Canton, was in the first law class at then-St. Ignatius College of Law. In 1929, the Filipino Ignatians was founded. In 1930, the African American Isaiah Fletcher was a starting tackle on the football team, years before most colleges became integrated. In 1936, Earl Booker, another African American, won the Intercollegiate Boxing Championship.

International students made up 15.5% of the student body in the fall of 2017. International students have a special orientation period and a variety of student groups like the International Student Association, Global Living Community, an International Advisory Council, and an International Network Program. USF sponsors an annual International Education Week with an international fair featuring consulates in the San Francisco area, storytelling opportunities, educational speakers, and a performance event called "Cultures cape".

=== Undergraduate admissions ===
USF is categorized as more selective for undergraduates according to both College Factual and U.S. News & World Report.

In its 2024 rankings, U.S. News listed USF as having a 0.77 diversity index, tied with Andrews University as the most diverse "national university" in the United States.

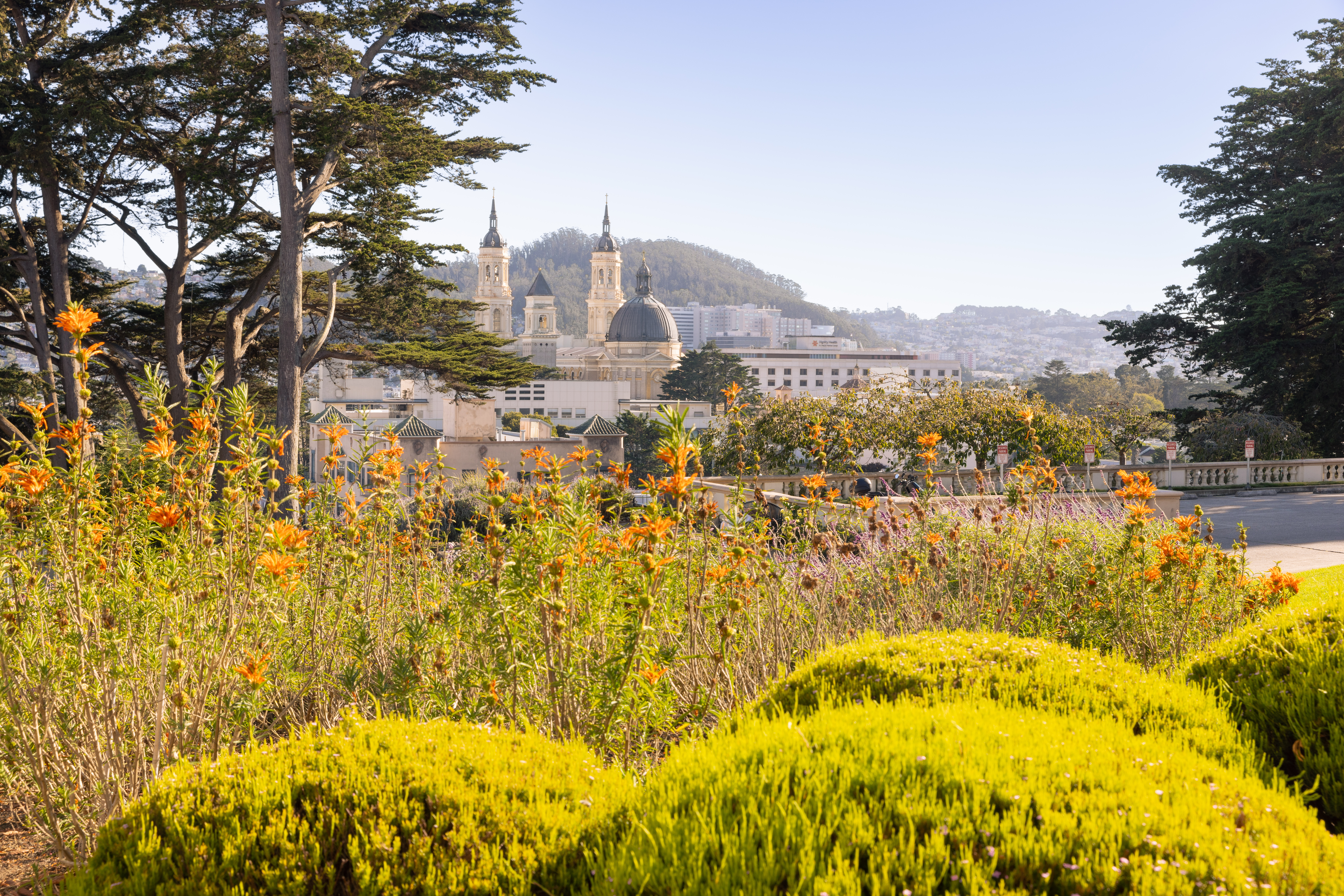
USF in the fall

=== Financial aid ===
According to USF, "98% of fall 2025 incoming students received financial aid, with an average aid package of $41,708." USF provides a net price calculator on its website.

For the 2026–2027 year, tuition for full-time undergraduates is $63,880. The total estimated cost for one year, including fees, housing, and dining, is $90,854.

=== Residence halls ===
Each residence hall or dormitory at USF contains at least one lounge, a kitchen, and laundry facilities. Halls are secured with a 24-hour desk staff. Community programs and activities are planned by resident advisors, resident ministers, the Residence Hall Council, and the Residence Hall Association.

On-campus

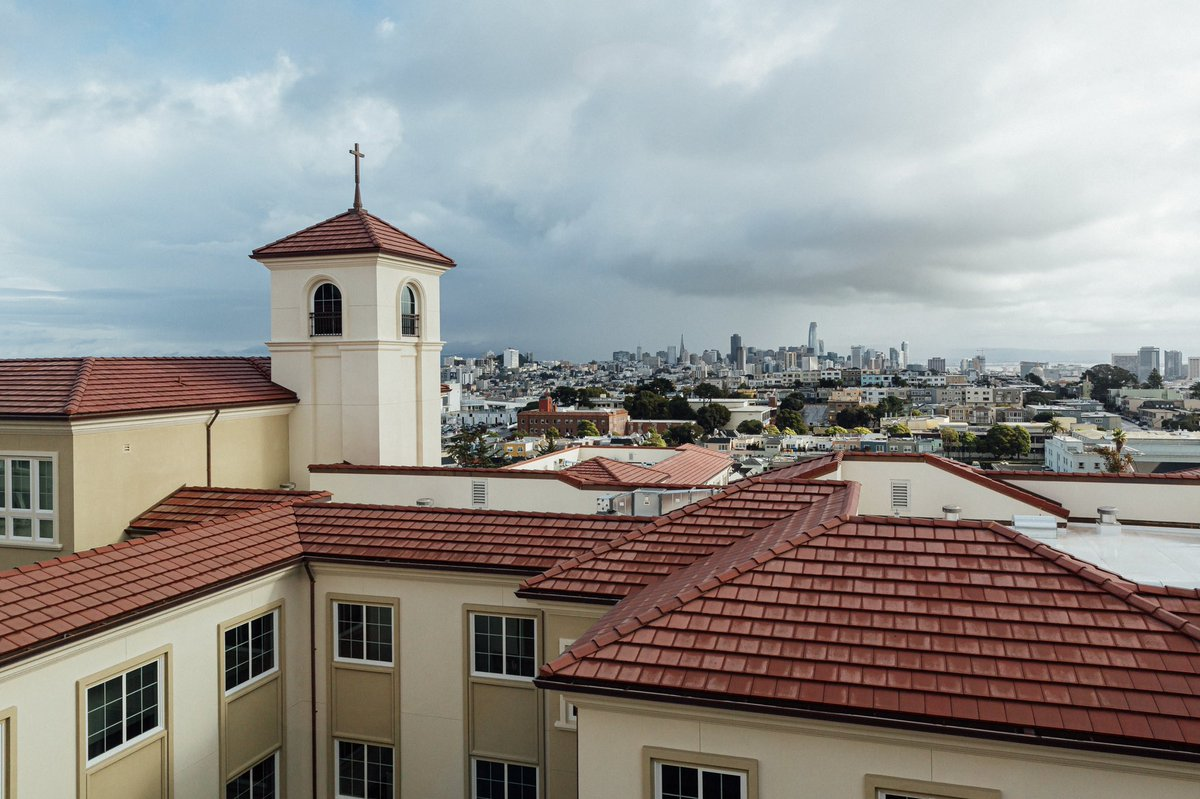
Lone Mountain East Residence Hall

- Fromm Hall (FR)
- Gillson Hall (GI)
- Hayes-Healy Hall (HH)
- Lone Mountain (LMN)
- Lone Mountain East (LME)
- Pedro Arrupe Hall (PA)
- Toler Hall (TO)
- Loyola Village (LV)

==== Off-campus ====
- Fulton House and Fulton House Cottage

== Athletics ==
USF competes in NCAA Division I, and is a charter member of the West Coast Conference, along with local rivals Santa Clara University and Saint Mary's College of California. Sports offered are men's and women's basketball, cross country, golf, soccer, tennis, track and field, as well as men's baseball and women's volleyball and sand volleyball. USF's mascot is the Don, and its colors are green and gold.

=== History ===
Athletics programs at USF date back to its founding in 1855, when founder Anthony Maraschi, S.J., organized ball games as recreation for the first students. Intercollegiate competition dates back to 1907, when then St. Ignatius College began playing organized baseball, basketball, and rugby against other local colleges and high schools. Rivalries with neighboring Santa Clara University and Saint Mary's College of California have their origins in this early period.

The university's Olympians have included Israeli long-distance runner Maor Tiyouri, American-born Marshallese runner Haley Nemra, Venezuelan-American basketball player John Cox, and synchronized swimmer Mariya Koroleva.

=== 1951 USF Dons football team ===
The 1951 USF Dons football team, coached by Joe Kuharich, went undefeated with a record of 9–0, and produced nine future NFL players. Five became NFL Pro-Bowlers, and Gino Marchetti, Ollie Matson, and Bob St. Clair later were inducted into the Pro Football Hall of Fame – a record for one college team. The team's Burl Toler became the first African American official in the NFL. Future NFL Commissioner Pete Rozelle played a role as the Dons' Athletic Publicist. At the height of their success, due to the team having two African-American star players, Ollie Matson and Burl Toler, they were not invited to play in any of the college football bowl games hosted by the SEC (Southeastern Conference). The team, less Toler and Matson, was invited to the Orange Bowl, but declined. Guard Dick Columbini said, "'No, we're not going to leave 'em at home' ... 'We're going to play with 'em or we're not going to play.'" The USF Athletic Department dropped its football program in 1952, due to a deficit in department funds.

=== Basketball ===
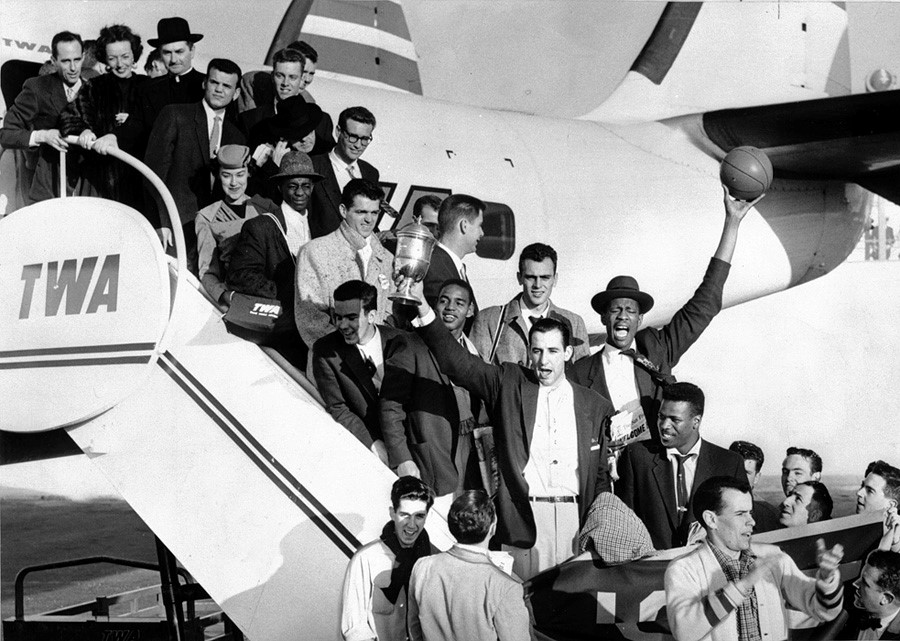
The 1954–55 USF NCAA Championship basketball team

The men's basketball program won three national championships: the 1949 NIT Championship, with Don Lofgran as MVP, and the 1955 and 1956 NCAA National Championships, going undefeated in the 1956 season. Led by NBA Hall of Famers Bill Russell and K.C. Jones, the 1956 Dons became the first undefeated team to win a national championship, winning a then-record 60 games in a row from 1954 to 1956 before losing an exhibition game to the USA Men's Olympic Basketball team. Also of note, the 1954–1955 USF basketball teams became the first major college or university basketball team to win a national title with three African American starters (Russell, Jones, and Hal Perry).

Soccer

The soccer program began at USF in 1931, and won five titles from 1932 to 1936. The team captain was All-American Gus Donoghue, who returned to the university as head coach in 1946, winning several titles, including a co-championship with Penn State in 1949.

At Donoghue's retirement in 1960, Stephen Negoesco, All-American and Holocaust survivor took over, having played under Donoghue in the 50s. He coached the team from 1962 to 2000, and led them to 540 wins and four national championships (1966, 1975, 1976, and 1980). Negoesco was inducted into the National Soccer Hall of Fame in 2003, having set a US record for games won in intercollegiate soccer competition.

Under Negoesco's successor, alumnus Erik Visser, the men's team earned the 2004, 2005, and 2008 WCC titles.

== See also ==
- St. Ignatius Institute
- List of colleges and universities in California
- List of Jesuit sites
