= 1981–82 Big East Conference men's basketball season =

American college basketball season

1981–82 Big East Conference Men's Basketball Season
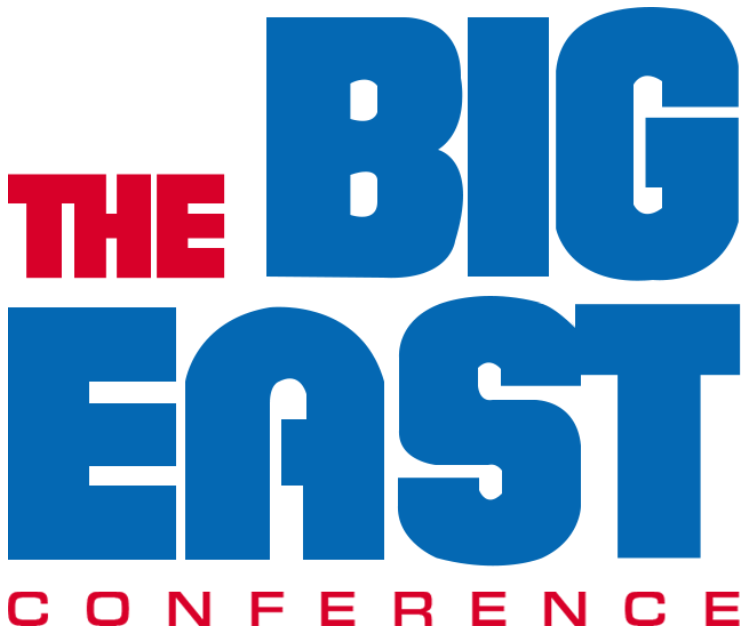
- League: NCAA Division I
- Sport: Basketball
- Duration: November 27, 1981 through March 6, 1982
- Teams: 8
- TV partner: ESPN

Regular Season
- Champion: Villanova (11–3)
- Season MVP: Dan Callandrillo – Seton Hall

Tournament
- Champions: Georgetown
- Finals MVP: Sleepy Floyd – Georgetown

Basketball seasons
- 1980–81 1982–83

1981–82 Big East men's basketball standings
	Conf.				Overall
Team	W		L	PCT	W		L	PCT
Villanova	11	–	3	.786	24	–	8	.750
No. 6 Georgetown†	10	–	4	.714	30	–	7	.811
St. John's	9	–	5	.643	21	–	9	.700
Boston College	8	–	6	.571	22	–	10	.688
Syracuse	7	–	7	.500	16	–	13	.552
Connecticut	7	–	7	.500	17	–	11	.607
Providence	2	–	12	.143	10	–	17	.370
Seton Hall	2	–	12	.143	11	–	16	.407
† 1982 Big East tournament winner As of March 29, 1982; Rankings from AP Poll

The 1981–82 Big East Conference men's basketball season was the third in conference history, and involved its eight full-time member schools.

Villanova won the regular season championship with an 11–3 record. Georgetown was the champion of the Big East tournament.

== Season summary & highlights ==
- Villanova won its first regular-season championship, with a record of 11–3.
- Georgetown won the Big East tournament, giving the Hoyas their second conference tournament championship.
- The Big East tournament took place at the Hartford Civic Center in Hartford, Connecticut.
- Georgetown advanced to the final of the NCAA Tournament, losing to North Carolina in the closing seconds. The attendance of 61,612 at the Louisiana Superdome was the largest paid basketball crowd in NCAA history.
- The Big East awarded its Defensive Player of the Year award for the first time.

== Head coaches ==
School	Coach	Season	Notes
Boston College	Tom Davis	5th	Resigned March 26, 1982
Connecticut	Dom Perno	5th	
Georgetown	John Thompson, Jr.	10th	
Providence	Joe Mullaney	15th	First season of second stint; previously coached Providence 1955–1969
St. John's	Lou Carnesecca	14th	
Seton Hall	Hoddy Mahon	1st	Acting head coach; replaced April 5, 1982
Syracuse	Jim Boeheim	6th	
Villanova	Rollie Massimino	9th	Big East Coach of the Year

== Rankings ==
Georgetown was ranked in the Top 20 of the Associated Press poll for most of the season. St. John's and Villanova also made appearances in the Top 20 during the season.

1981–82 Big East Conference Weekly Rankings Key: ██ Increase in ranking. ██ Decrease in ranking.
AP Poll	Pre	11/30	12/7	12/14	12/21	12/28	1/4	1/11	1/18	1/25	2/1	2/8	2/15	2/22	3/1	Final
Boston College																
Connecticut																
Georgetown	5	20	20	19	17	17	13	8	13			20	13	12	8	6
Providence																
St. John's							20									
Seton Hall																
Syracuse																
Villanova				18	20	19										

== Regular-season statistical leaders ==
Scoring
Name	School	PPG
Dan Callandrillo	SHU	25.9
John Bagley	BC	21.1
David Russell	SJU	17.4
John Pinone	Vill	17.2
Erich Santifer	Syr	17.0

Rebounding
Name	School	RPG
Corny Thompson	Conn	8.3
Otis Thorpe	Prov	8.0
Ed Pinckney	Vill	7.8
Patrick Ewing	GU	7.5
David Russell	SJU	7.0

Assists
Name	School	APG
Stewart Granger	Vill	5.7
Leo Rautins	Syr	5.2
Bob Kelly	SJU	4.6
Jim Panaggio	Prov	4.0
Gene Waldron	Syr	3.9

Steals
Name	School	SPG
Dan Callandrillo	SHU	2.2
Norman Bailey	Conn	2.2
Fred Brown	GU	2.2
Eric Smith	GU	2.0
John Bagley	BC	1.9

Blocks
Name	School	BPG
Patrick Ewing	GU	3.2
Ed Pinckney	Vill	2.0
Burnett Adams	BC	1.3
Bill Wennington	SJU	1.2
John Garris	BC	1.1

Field Goals
Name	School	FG%
Ed Pinckney	Vill	.640
John Pinone	Vill	.565
Erich Santifer	Syr	.558
Otis Thorpe	Prov	.541
David Russell	SJU	.535

Free Throws
Name	School	FT%
Dan Callandrillo	SHU	.825
John Bagley	BC	.797
Chris Mullin	SJU	.791
Tony Bruin	Syr	.771
David Russell	SJU	.770

== Postseason ==
=== Big East tournament ===
==== Seeding ====
Seeding in the Big East tournament was based on conference record, with tiebreakers applied as necessary. The tournament's seeding was as follows: (1) Vilanova, (2) Georgetown, (3) St. John's, (4) Boston College, (5) Syracuse, (6) Connecticut, (7) Providence, (8) Seton Hall.

==== Bracket ====
Quarterfinals
1	Villanova	88
8	Seton Hall	73
4	Boston College	94
5	Syracuse	92
2	#8 Georgetown	62
7	Providence	48
3	St. John's	54
6	Connecticut	52

Semifinals
1	Villanova	74
4	Boston College	71
2	#8 Georgetown	57
3	St. John's	42

Championship Game
1	Villanova	54
2	#8 Georgetown	72

=== NCAA tournament ===
Four Big East teams received bids to the NCAA Tournament. St. John's lost in the second round in the East Region, Villanova lost in the East Region finals, and Boston College lost in the Mideast Region finals. Georgetown received a No. 1 seed in the West Region and finished as national runner-up, advancing to the final and losing to North Carolina in the closing seconds.

School	Region	Seed	Round 1	Round 2	Sweet 16	Elite 8	Final 4	Final
Georgetown	West	1	Bye	8 Wyoming, W 51–43	4 Fresno State, W 58–40	2 Oregon State, W 69–45	3ME Louisville, W 50–46	1E North Carolina, L 63–62
Villanova	East	3	Bye	11 Northeastern, W 76–72 (3OT)	2 Memphis State, W 70–66	1 North Carolina, L 70–60		
Boston College	Midwest	8	9 San Francisco, W 70–66	1 DePaul, W 82–75	5 Kansas State, W 69–65	6 Houston, L 99–92		
St. John's	East	5	12 Penn, W 66–56	4 Alabama, L 69–68				

=== National Invitation Tournament ===
Two Big East teams received bids to the National Invitation Tournament, which did not yet have seeding. They played in two different unnamed brackets. Connecticut lost in the first round and Syracuse in the second round.

School	Round 1	Round 2
Syracuse	Saint Peter's, W 84–75	Bradley, L 95–81
Connecticut	Dayton, L 76–75	

== Awards and honors ==
=== Big East Conference ===
Player of the Year:

- Dan Callandrillo, Seton Hall, G, Sr.

Defensive Player of the Year:

- Patrick Ewing, Georgetown, C, Fr.

Freshman of the Year:

- Patrick Ewing, Georgetown, C

Coach of the Year:

- Rollie Massimino, Villanova (9th season)

All-Big East First Team

- John Bagley, Boston College, G, Jr., 6 ft 0 in (183 cm), 225 lb (102 kg), Bridgeport, Conn.
- Corny Thompson, Connecticut, F, Sr., 6 ft 8 in (203 cm), 225 lb (102 kg), Middletown, Conn.
- Sleepy Floyd, Georgetown, G, Sr., 6 ft 3 in (191 cm), 172 lb (78 kg), Gastonia, N.C.
- Dan Callandrillo, Seton Hall, G, Sr., 6 ft 2 in (188 cm), 185 lb (84 kg), Gastonia, North Bergen, N.J.
- David Russell, St. John's, F, Jr., 6 ft 7 in (201 cm), 215 lb (98 kg), New York, N.Y.
- John Pinone, Villanova, F, Jr., 6 ft 8 in (203 cm), 230 lb (104 kg), Hartford, Conn.

All-Big East Second Team:

- Mike McKay, Connecticut, G, Sr., 6 ft 5 in (196 cm), 190 lb (86 kg), Bridgeport, Conn.
- Patrick Ewing, Georgetown, C, Fr., 7 ft 0 in (213 cm), 240 lb (109 kg), Cambridge, Mass.
- Chris Mullin, St. John's, F, Fr., 6 ft 6 in (198 cm), 205 lb (93 kg), Brooklyn, N.Y.
- Erich Santifer, Syracuse, G, Jr., 6 ft 6 in (198 cm), 205 lb (93 kg), Ann Arbor, Mich.
- Stewart Granger, Villanova, G, Jr., 6 ft 3 in (191 cm), 190 lb (86 kg), Montreal, Quebec, Canada

All-Big East Third Team:

- Eric Smith, Georgetown, F, Sr., 6 ft 5 in (196 cm), 185 lb (84 kg), Potomac, Md.
- Otis Thorpe, Providence, F, So., 6 ft 10 in (208 cm), 248 lb (112 kg), Boynton Beach, Fla.
- Ron Jackson, Providence, G, Jr., 6 ft 5 in (196 cm), 205 lb (93 kg), West Roxbury, Mass.
- Billy Goodwin, St. John's, F, Jr., 6 ft 5 in (196 cm), 220 lb (100 kg), New York, N.Y.
- Tony Bruin, Syracuse, F, Jr., 6 ft 5 in (196 cm), 200 lb (91 kg), Astoria, N.Y.

Big East All-Freshman Team:

- Anthony Jones, Georgetown, G, Fr., 6 ft 6 in (198 cm), 195 lb (88 kg), Washington, D.C.
- Patrick Ewing, Georgetown, C, Fr., 7 ft 0 in (213 cm), 240 lb (109 kg), Cambridge, Mass.
- Chris Mullin, St. John's, F, Fr., 6 ft 6 in (198 cm), 205 lb (93 kg), Brooklyn, N.Y.
- Dwayne McClain, Villanova, G, Fr., 6 ft 6 in (198 cm), 195 lb (88 kg), Worcester, Mass.
- Ed Pinckney, Villanova, F, Fr., 6 ft 9 in (206 cm), 205 lb (93 kg), Bronx, N.Y.

=== All-Americans ===
The following players were selected to the 1982 Associated Press All-America teams.

Consensus All-America team:

- Sleepy Floyd, Georgetown, Key Stats: 16.7 ppg, 3.4 rpg, 2.7 apg, 50.4 FG%, 619 points

First Team All-America:

- Sleepy Floyd, Georgetown, Key Stats: 19.0 ppg, 4.2 rpg, 2.6 apg, 46.7 FG%, 607 points

AP Honorable Mention

- John Bagley, Boston College
- Patrick Ewing, Georgetown
- John Pinone, Villanova
- David Russell, St. John's
- Erich Santifer, Syracuse
- Corny Thompson, Connecticut

== See also ==
- 1981–82 NCAA Division I men's basketball season
- 1981–82 Boston College Eagles men's basketball team
- 1981–82 Connecticut Huskies men's basketball team
- 1981–82 Georgetown Hoyas men's basketball team
- 1981–82 St. John's Redmen basketball team
- 1981–82 Syracuse Orangemen basketball team
- 1981–82 Villanova Wildcats men's basketball team
