= 1992 NBA playoffs =

Postseason tournament

Tournament details
- Dates: April 23–June 14, 1992
- Season: 1991–92
- Teams: 16

Final positions
- Champions: Chicago Bulls (2nd title)
- Runners-up: Portland Trail Blazers
- Semifinalists: Cleveland Cavaliers; Utah Jazz

Tournament statistics
- Scoring leader(s): Michael Jordan (Bulls) (34.5 PPG)

Awards
- MVP: Michael Jordan (Bulls)

The 1992 NBA playoffs was the postseason tournament following the National Basketball Association's 1991-92 season. The tournament concluded with the Eastern Conference champion Chicago Bulls defeating the Western Conference champion Portland Trail Blazers 4 games to 2 in the NBA Finals. Michael Jordan was named NBA Finals MVP for the second straight year.

The Blazers won their second Western Conference title in the past three years, and third overall in franchise history, behind the leadership of Clyde Drexler.

The Jazz made the Western Conference Finals for the first time in franchise history. They returned in 1994 and 1996 before finally breaking through in 1997.

The fourth-year Miami Heat became the first of the 1988 and 1989 expansion teams to make the playoffs, though they were swept in the first round by the Bulls. In 2006, the Heat would become the first of these teams to win the NBA title.

This was the first year since 1987 that the Bulls and Pistons did not meet in the playoffs. They did not meet again until 2007.

Likewise, it was the second straight year the Bulls and New York Knicks met in the playoffs with the Knicks taking the Bulls to a Game 7 in their Eastern Conference Semifinal series before losing.

This was the first time since 1986, that the Pistons did not reach the Eastern Conference Finals, as well as, losing in the first round.

The Clippers made it to the playoffs for the first time since 1976, when they were the Buffalo Braves. It was also the first time since the Clippers' arrival in Los Angeles in 1984 that both of Los Angeles' NBA teams, the Clippers and Lakers, qualified for postseason play together.

Despite Magic Johnson's stunning retirement due to testing HIV positive prior to the start of the season, the Los Angeles Lakers still managed to make their 16th straight NBA playoff appearance. It was their first appearance since 1974 without Johnson, Michael Cooper, or Kareem Abdul-Jabbar.

Two games were postponed due to the Los Angeles riots following the Rodney King verdict, one being the Trail Blazers at the Lakers and the other was the Jazz at the Clippers. For safety purposes, both the Lakers and Clippers decided to move their home games to a nearby alternate venue; the Lakers played at the Thomas & Mack Center in Las Vegas, Nevada (formerly an alternate home arena of the Jazz in 1983–84 and 1984–85 seasons; later host to the 2007 NBA All-Star Game) for Game 4, the Clippers at Anaheim Convention Center in Anaheim, California for Game 4 (the Clippers returned to Anaheim at Arrowhead Pond in 1994 as an alternate venue and played there until 1999 whenever the Los Angeles Memorial Sports Arena was unavailable).

Game 4 of the Blazers-Suns series was the last game ever played at the Arizona Veterans Memorial Coliseum. It was a long game that lasted two overtimes and broke the NBA's playoff game record for points scored in one game, the Trail Blazers outlasting the Suns by a score of 153–151.

The Celtics' first-round sweep of the Pacers would be their last playoff series win until 2002. After losing in the second round to Cleveland, Larry Bird retired after 13 seasons. As for the Cavs, it was their first Conference Finals appearance since 1976, but fell to the Bulls in 6 games. They would not return again until 2007.

== Playoff seeds ==
=== Eastern Conference ===
1. Chicago Bulls (67–15)
2. Boston Celtics (51–31)
3. Cleveland Cavaliers (57–25)
4. New York Knicks (51–31)
5. Detroit Pistons (48–34)
6. New Jersey Nets (40–42)
7. Indiana Pacers (40–42)
8. Miami Heat (38–44)

=== Western Conference ===
1. Portland Trail Blazers (57–25)
2. Utah Jazz (55–27)
3. Golden State Warriors (55–27)
4. Phoenix Suns (53–29)
5. San Antonio Spurs (47–35)
6. Seattle SuperSonics (47–35)
7. Los Angeles Clippers (45–37)
8. Los Angeles Lakers (43–39)

== Bracket ==
First round
E1	Chicago*	3
E8	Miami	0
E4	New York	3
E5	Detroit	2
E3	Cleveland	3
E6	New Jersey	1
E2	Boston*	3
E7	Indiana	0
W1	Portland*	3
W8	LA Lakers	1
W4	Phoenix	3
W5	San Antonio	0
W3	Golden State	1
W6	Seattle	3
W2	Utah*	3
W7	LA Clippers	2

Quarter-finals
E1	Chicago*	4
E4	New York	3
E3	Cleveland	4
E2	Boston*	3
W1	Portland*	4
W4	Phoenix	1
W6	Seattle	1
W2	Utah*	4

Semi-finals
E1	Chicago*	4
E3	Cleveland	2
W1	Portland*	4
W2	Utah*	2

Final
E1	Chicago*	4
W1	Portland*	2

- * Division winner
- Bold Series winner
- Italic Team with home-court advantage

== First round ==
=== Eastern Conference first round ===
==== (1) Chicago Bulls vs. (8) Miami Heat ====
TNT

April 24
8:00 PM

Boxscore

Miami Heat 94, Chicago Bulls 113
Scoring by quarter: 27–24, 26–36, 20–27, 21–26
Pts: Steve Smith 19; Rebs: Rony Seikaly 11; Asts: Steve Smith 7	Pts: Michael Jordan 46; Rebs: Michael Jordan 11; Asts: Scottie Pippen 11
Chicago leads series, 1–0

Chicago Stadium, Chicago, Illinois
Attendance: 18,676
Referees: Joe Forte, Darell Garretson, David Jones

- The first playoff game in Miami Heat history.

NBC

April 26
5:30 PM

Boxscore

Miami Heat 90, Chicago Bulls 120
Scoring by quarter: 20–32, 21–32, 23–29, 26–27
Pts: Rony Seikaly 26; Rebs: Rony Seikaly 7 Asts: Bimbo Coles 4	Pts: Michael Jordan 33; Rebs: Michael Jordan 13; Asts: Michael Jordan 6
Chicago leads series, 2–0

Chicago Stadium, Chicago, Illinois
Attendance: 18,676
Referees: Terry Durham, Mike Mathis, Paul Mihalak

TNT

April 29
8:00 PM

Boxscore

Chicago Bulls 119, Miami Heat 114
Scoring by quarter: 19–33, 32–23, 28–24, 40–34
Pts: Michael Jordan 56; Rebs: Pippen, Grant 8 each Asts: Pippen, Jordan 5 each	Pts: Glen Rice 25; Rebs: Rony Seikaly 12; Asts: Shaw, Smith 6 each
Chicago wins series, 3–0

Miami Arena, Miami, Florida
Attendance: 15,008
Referees: Jess Kersey, Ronnie Nunn, Derrick Stafford

Regular-season series
Chicago won 4–0 in the regular-season series

January 8, 1992

Recap

Chicago Bulls 108, Miami Heat 106

Miami Arena, Miami

January 11, 1992

Recap

Miami Heat 99, Chicago Bulls 108

Chicago Stadium, Chicago, Illinois

March 6, 1992

Recap

Miami Heat 81, Chicago Bulls 123

Chicago Stadium, Chicago, Illinois

March 16, 1992

Recap

Chicago Bulls 116, Miami Heat 100

Miami Arena, Miami

This was the first playoff meeting between the Bulls and the Heat.

==== (2) Boston Celtics vs. (7) Indiana Pacers ====
TNT

April 23
8:00 PM

Boxscore

Indiana Pacers 113, Boston Celtics 124
Scoring by quarter: 28–32, 25–21, 34–34, 26–37
Pts: Reggie Miller 29; Rebs: Detlef Schrempf 11; Asts: Micheal Williams 6	Pts: Reggie Lewis 36; Rebs: Robert Parish 14; Asts: John Bagley 9
Boston leads series, 1–0

Boston Garden, Boston, Massachusetts
Attendance: 14,890
Referees: Ron Garretson, Ed T. Rush, Don Vaden

NBC

April 25
1:00 PM

Boxscore

Indiana Pacers 112, Boston Celtics 119 (OT)
Scoring by quarter: 34–31, 27–18, 27–37, 14–16, Overtime: 10–17
Pts: Chuck Person 32; Rebs: LaSalle Thompson 9 Asts: Micheal Williams 7	Pts: John Bagley 35; Rebs: Robert Parish 14; Asts: John Bagley 15
Boston leads series, 2–0

Boston Garden, Boston, Massachusetts
Attendance: 14,890
Referees: Ed Middleton, Jake O'Donnell, Eddie F. Rush

TNT

April 27
8:00 PM

Boxscore

Boston Celtics 102, Indiana Pacers 98
Scoring by quarter: 33–26, 24–21, 21–29, 24–22
Pts: Reggie Lewis 32; Rebs: Ed Pinckney 14; Asts: John Bagley 11	Pts: Reggie Miller 32; Rebs: Dale Davis 13; Asts: Micheal Williams 11
Boston wins series, 3–0

Market Square Arena, Indianapolis, Indiana
Attendance: 16,530
Referees: Hugh Evans, Tommy Nunez Sr., Ronnie Nunn

Regular-season series
Tied 2–2 in the regular-season series

November 20, 1991

Recap

Indiana Pacers 101, Boston Celtics 116

Boston Garden, Boston

February 23, 1992

Recap

Boston Celtics 95, Indiana Pacers 102

Market Square Arena, Indianapolis

February 26, 1992

Recap

Indiana Pacers 109, Boston Celtics 130

Boston Garden, Boston

April 3, 1992

Recap

Boston Celtics 97, Indiana Pacers 101

Market Square Arena, Indianapolis

This was the second playoff meeting between these two teams, with the Celtics winning the first meeting.

Previous playoff series
Boston leads 1–0 in all-time playoff series

1991

Boston Celtics 3, Indiana Pacers 2

1991 Eastern Conference First Round

==== (3) Cleveland Cavaliers vs. (6) New Jersey Nets ====
SportsChannel Ohio

April 23
7:30 PM

Boxscore

New Jersey Nets 113, Cleveland Cavaliers 120
Scoring by quarter: 30–36, 31–32, 26–23, 26–29
Pts: Dražen Petrović 40; Rebs: Derrick Coleman 11; Asts: Derrick Coleman 9	Pts: Brad Daugherty 40; Rebs: Brad Daugherty 16; Asts: Mark Price 10
Cleveland leads series, 1–0

Richfield Coliseum, Richfield, Ohio
Attendance: 16,512
Referees: Bernie Fryer, Ed Middleton, Jake O'Donnell

TNT

April 25
8:30 PM

Boxscore

New Jersey Nets 96, Cleveland Cavaliers 118
Scoring by quarter: 20–36, 26–26, 27–28, 23–28
Pts: Derrick Coleman 24; Rebs: Derrick Coleman 9 Asts: Mookie Blaylock 6	Pts: Brad Daugherty 29; Rebs: Hot Rod Williams 9 Asts: Mark Price 15
Cleveland leads series, 2–0

Richfield Coliseum, Richfield, Ohio
Attendance: 20,273
Referees: Ron Garretson, Ed T. Rush, Don Vaden

SportsChannel New York

April 28
7:30 PM

Boxscore

Cleveland Cavaliers 104, New Jersey Nets 109
Scoring by quarter: 30–31, 24–28, 30–18, 20–32
Pts: Larry Nance 28; Rebs: Larry Nance 14; Asts: Mark Price 12	Pts: Chris Morris 28; Rebs: Derrick Coleman 11; Asts: Mookie Blaylock 12
Cleveland leads series, 2–1

Brendan Byrne Arena, East Rutherford, New Jersey
Attendance: 15,258
Referees: Mike Mathis, Tommy Nunez Sr., Eddie F. Rush

TNT

April 30
8:00 PM

Boxscore

Cleveland Cavaliers 98, New Jersey Nets 89
Scoring by quarter: 16–30, 24–18, 27–25, 31–16
Pts: Hot Rod Williams 20; Rebs: Brad Daugherty 14; Asts: Craig Ehlo 7	Pts: Coleman, Morris 22 each Rebs: Derrick Coleman 14; Asts: Derrick Coleman 6
Cleveland wins series, 3–1

Brendan Byrne Arena, East Rutherford, New Jersey
Attendance: 13,071
Referees: Joe Crawford, Jack Nies, Bill Oakes

Regular-season series
Tied 2–2 in the regular-season series

November 21, 1991

Recap

New Jersey Nets 112, Cleveland Cavaliers 116

The Coliseum, Richfield, Ohio

December 18, 1991

Recap

Cleveland Cavaliers 93, New Jersey Nets 102

Meadowlands Arena, East Rutherford, New Jersey

February 15, 1992

Recap

New Jersey Nets 92, Cleveland Cavaliers 128

The Coliseum, Richfield, Ohio

April 10, 1992

Recap

Cleveland Cavaliers 86, New Jersey Nets 110

Meadowlands Arena, East Rutherford, New Jersey

This was the first playoff meeting between the Cavaliers and the Nets.

==== (4) New York Knicks vs. (5) Detroit Pistons ====
MSG Network

April 24
7:30 PM

Boxscore

Detroit Pistons 75, New York Knicks 109
Scoring by quarter: 16–22, 22–27, 15–32, 22–28
Pts: Joe Dumars 13; Rebs: John Salley 5 Asts: Joe Dumars 5	Pts: Patrick Ewing 24; Rebs: Patrick Ewing 12; Asts: Mark Jackson 6
New York leads series, 1–0

Madison Square Garden, New York City, New York
Attendance: 19,081
Referees: Terry Durham, Bernie Fryer, Mike Mathis

NBC

April 26
3:30 PM

Boxscore

Detroit Pistons 89, New York Knicks 88
Scoring by quarter: 18–23, 22–18, 27–28, 22–19
Pts: Joe Dumars 21; Rebs: Bill Laimbeer 12; Asts: Isiah Thomas 6	Pts: Xavier McDaniel 24; Rebs: Charles Oakley 18; Asts: Mark Jackson 10
Series tied, 1–1

Madison Square Garden, New York City, New York
Attendance: 18,793
Referees: Dan Crawford, Darell Garretson, Lee Jones

- Isiah Thomas hits game-winning jumper with 7.6 seconds left.

TNT

April 28
8:00 PM

Boxscore

New York Knicks 90, Detroit Pistons 87 (OT)
Scoring by quarter: 22–20, 18–21, 21–18, 18–20, Overtime: 11–8
Pts: Patrick Ewing 32; Rebs: Ewing, McDaniel 13 each Asts: Mark Jackson 7	Pts: John Salley 20; Rebs: Dennis Rodman 14; Asts: Isiah Thomas 11
New York leads series, 2–1

The Palace of Auburn Hills, Auburn Hills, Michigan
Attendance: 21,454
Referees: Joe Crawford, Bill Oakes, Blane Reichelt

- Patrick Ewing hits the game-tying shot with 13.4 seconds left.

TNT

May 1
8:00 PM

Boxscore

New York Knicks 82, Detroit Pistons 86
Scoring by quarter: 23–19, 16–30, 25–21, 18–16
Pts: Ewing, McDaniel 18 each Rebs: Charles Oakley 16; Asts: Greg Anthony 6	Pts: Joe Dumars 23; Rebs: Dennis Rodman 17; Asts: Isiah Thomas 12
Series tied, 2–2

The Palace of Auburn Hills, Auburn Hills, Michigan
Attendance: 21,454
Referees: Dick Bavetta, Hugh Evans, Jack Nies

NBC

May 3
1:00 PM

Boxscore

Detroit Pistons 87, New York Knicks 94
Scoring by quarter: 23–19, 12–19, 23–25, 29–31
Pts: Isiah Thomas 31; Rebs: Isiah Thomas 10; Asts: Isiah Thomas 6	Pts: Patrick Ewing 31; Rebs: Patrick Ewing 19; Asts: Mark Jackson 5
New York wins series, 3–2

Madison Square Garden, New York City, New York
Attendance: 19,135
Referees: Hue Hollins, Jess Kersey, Jake O'Donnell

Regular-season series
Tied 2–2 in the regular-season series

November 22, 1991

Recap

New York Knicks 99, Detroit Pistons 90

The Palace of Auburn Hills, Auburn Hills, Michigan

November 30, 1991

Recap

Detroit Pistons 96, New York Knicks 103

Madison Square Garden, New York City

April 7, 1992

Recap

Detroit Pistons 103, New York Knicks 94

Madison Square Garden, New York City

April 12, 1992

Recap

New York Knicks 61, Detroit Pistons 72

The Palace of Auburn Hills, Auburn Hills, Michigan

This was the third playoff meeting between these two teams, with each team winning one series apiece.

Previous playoff series
Tied 1–1 in all-time playoff series

1984

Detroit Pistons 2, New York Knicks 3

1984 Eastern Conference First Round

1990

Detroit Pistons 4, New York Knicks 1

1990 Eastern Conference Semifinals

- This is the most recent playoff series between the Knicks & Pistons until 2025.

=== Western Conference first round ===
==== (1) Portland Trail Blazers vs. (8) Los Angeles Lakers ====
TNT

April 23
10:30 PM

Boxscore

Los Angeles Lakers 102, Portland Trail Blazers 115
Scoring by quarter: 18–35, 23–40, 33–18, 28–22
Pts: Scott, Teagle 22 each Rebs: A.C. Green 10; Asts: Byron Scott 5	Pts: Clifford Robinson 24; Rebs: Buck Williams 13; Asts: Clyde Drexler 10
Portland leads series, 1–0

Memorial Coliseum, Portland, Oregon
Attendance: 12,888
Referees: Hugh Evans, Hue Hollins, Wally Rooney

NBC

April 25
3:30 PM

Boxscore

Los Angeles Lakers 79, Portland Trail Blazers 101
Scoring by quarter: 16–25, 21–25, 18–28, 24–23
Pts: Byron Scott 16; Rebs: Elden Campbell 12; Asts: Divac, Sparrow 4 each	Pts: Kevin Duckworth 19; Rebs: Buck Williams 12; Asts: Terry Porter 6
Portland leads series, 2–0

Memorial Coliseum, Portland, Oregon
Attendance: 12,888
Referees: Bruce Alexander, Joe Crawford, Bill Oakes

TNT

April 29
10:30 PM

Boxscore

Portland Trail Blazers 119, Los Angeles Lakers 121 (OT)
Scoring by quarter: 25–23, 22–30, 30–22, 25–27, Overtime: 17–19
Pts: Clyde Drexler 42; Rebs: Buck Williams 13; Asts: Clyde Drexler 12	Pts: Terry Teagle 26; Rebs: A.C. Green 10; Asts: Sedale Threatt 6
Portland leads series, 2–1

Great Western Forum, Inglewood, California
Attendance: 16,690
Referees: Terry Durham, Paul Mihalak, Jake O'Donnell

- Terry Porter hits the game-tying 3 with 29.6 seconds left to force OT.

NBC

May 3
3:30 PM

Boxscore

Portland Trail Blazers 102, Los Angeles Lakers 76
Scoring by quarter: 22–18, 27–15, 28–23, 25–20
Pts: Clyde Drexler 26; Rebs: Buck Williams 11; Asts: Clyde Drexler 7	Pts: Sedale Threatt 17; Rebs: A.C. Green 14; Asts: three players 4 each
Portland wins series, 3–1

Thomas & Mack Center, Las Vegas, Nevada
Attendance: 15,478
Referees: Joe Forte, Ron Garretson, Ed T. Rush

Lakers played a home game at Thomas & Mack Center in Las Vegas due to 1992 Los Angeles riots

Regular-season series
Portland won 4–1 in the regular-season series

December 28, 1991

Recap

Portland Trail Blazers 98, Los Angeles Lakers 88

Great Western Forum, Inglewood, California

January 21, 1992

Recap

Los Angeles Lakers 92, Portland Trail Blazers 131

Memorial Coliseum, Portland, Oregon

March 3, 1992

Recap

Los Angeles Lakers 101, Portland Trail Blazers 105

Memorial Coliseum, Portland, Oregon

March 18, 1992

Recap

Portland Trail Blazers 98, Los Angeles Lakers 93

Great Western Forum, Inglewood, California

April 18, 1992

Recap

Los Angeles Lakers 109, Portland Trail Blazers 101

Memorial Coliseum, Portland, Oregon

This was the sixth playoff meeting between these two teams, with the Lakers winning four of the first five meetings.

Previous playoff series
Los Angeles leads 4–1 in all-time playoff series

1977

Los Angeles Lakers 0, Portland Trail Blazers 4

1977 Western Conference Finals

1983

Los Angeles Lakers 4, Portland Trail Blazers 1

1983 Western Conference Semifinals

1985

Los Angeles Lakers 4, Portland Trail Blazers 1

1985 Western Conference Semifinals

1989

Los Angeles Lakers 3, Portland Trail Blazers 0

1989 Western Conference First Round

1991

Los Angeles Lakers 4, Portland Trail Blazers 2

1991 Western Conference Finals

==== (2) Utah Jazz vs. (7) Los Angeles Clippers ====
TNT

April 24
10:30 PM

Boxscore

Los Angeles Clippers 97, Utah Jazz 115
Scoring by quarter: 23–29, 24–30, 18–27, 32–29
Pts: Doc Rivers 23; Rebs: Charles Smith 9 Asts: Doc Rivers 5	Pts: Karl Malone 32; Rebs: Karl Malone 10; Asts: John Stockton 21
Utah leads series, 1–0

Delta Center, Salt Lake City, Utah
Attendance: 19,911
Referees: Bob Delaney, Jess Kersey, Jack Nies

TNT

April 26
7:00 PM

Boxscore

Los Angeles Clippers 92, Utah Jazz 103
Scoring by quarter: 28–22, 20–26, 19–27, 25–28
Pts: Danny Manning 22; Rebs: Ken Norman 14; Asts: Doc Rivers 6	Pts: Karl Malone 32; Rebs: Karl Malone 13; Asts: John Stockton 19
Utah leads series, 2–0

Delta Center, Salt Lake City, Utah
Attendance: 19,911
Referees: Bruce Alexander, Dick Bavetta, Steve Javie

SportsChannel Los Angeles

April 28
10:30 PM

Boxscore

Utah Jazz 88, Los Angeles Clippers 98
Scoring by quarter: 19–24, 17–23, 25–23, 27–28
Pts: Karl Malone 22; Rebs: Karl Malone 10; Asts: John Stockton 13	Pts: Danny Manning 17; Rebs: Ron Harper 12; Asts: three players 5 each
Utah leads series, 2–1

Los Angeles Memorial Sports Arena, Los Angeles, California
Attendance: 14,086
Referees: Dan Crawford, Ed T. Rush, Greg Willard

TNT

May 3
9:00 PM.

Boxscore

Utah Jazz 107, Los Angeles Clippers 115
Scoring by quarter: 21–22, 29–31, 26–26, 31–36
Pts: Karl Malone 44; Rebs: Karl Malone 11; Asts: John Stockton 18	Pts: Danny Manning 33; Rebs: Danny Manning 10; Asts: Norman, Grant 6 each
Series tied, 2–2

Anaheim Convention Center, Anaheim, California
Attendance: 7,148
Referees: Lee Jones, Mike Mathis, Paul Mihalak

TNT

May 4
10:30 PM

Boxscore

Los Angeles Clippers 89, Utah Jazz 98
Scoring by quarter: 30–18, 22–22, 25–33, 12–25
Pts: Danny Manning 24; Rebs: Ken Norman 10; Asts: Ron Harper 7	Pts: Jeff Malone 25; Rebs: Karl Malone 16; Asts: John Stockton 9
Utah wins series, 3–2

Delta Center, Salt Lake City, Utah
Attendance: 19,911
Referees: Joe Crawford, Darell Garretson, Bill Oakes

Los Angeles Clippers played a home game at Anaheim Convention Center due to 1992 Los Angeles riots

Regular-season series
Utah won 3–1 in the regular-season series

November 9, 1991

Recap

Los Angeles Clippers 84, Utah Jazz 101

Delta Center, Salt Lake City

December 13, 1991

Recap

Utah Jazz 101, Los Angeles Clippers 102 (OT)

Los Angeles Memorial Sports Arena, Los Angeles

December 26, 1991

Recap

Los Angeles Clippers 115, Utah Jazz 123

Delta Center, Salt Lake City

February 25, 1992

Recap

Utah Jazz 106, Los Angeles Clippers 101

Los Angeles Memorial Sports Arena, Los Angeles

This was the first playoff meeting between the Clippers and the Jazz.

==== (3) Golden State Warriors vs. (6) Seattle SuperSonics ====
SportsChannel Pacific

April 23
10:30 PM

Boxscore

Seattle SuperSonics 117, Golden State Warriors 109
Scoring by quarter: 32–30, 26–24, 38–26, 21–29
Pts: Kemp, Pierce 28 each Rebs: Shawn Kemp 16; Asts: Gary Payton 12	Pts: Billy Owens 25; Rebs: Billy Owens 11; Asts: Tim Hardaway 6
Seattle leads series, 1–0

Oakland–Alameda County Coliseum Arena, Oakland, California
Attendance: 15,025
Referees: Joe Crawford, Bill Oakes, Greg Willard

TNT

April 25
6:00 PM

Boxscore

Seattle SuperSonics 101, Golden State Warriors 115
Scoring by quarter: 29–25, 31–29, 18–30, 23–31
Pts: Eddie Johnson 22; Rebs: Shawn Kemp 19; Asts: Ricky Pierce 7	Pts: Tim Hardaway 23; Rebs: Billy Owens 12; Asts: Chris Mullin 6
Series tied, 1–1

Oakland–Alameda County Coliseum Arena, Oakland, California
Attendance: 15,025
Referees: Hugh Evans, Hue Hollins, Wally Rooney

TNT

April 28
10:30 PM

Boxscore

Golden State Warriors 128, Seattle SuperSonics 129
Scoring by quarter: 28–28, 32–37, 31–30, 37–34
Pts: Sarunas Marciulionis 27; Rebs: Billy Owens 7 Asts: Hardaway, Marciulionis 8 each	Pts: Derrick McKey 27; Rebs: Shawn Kemp 10; Asts: Nate McMillan 10
Seattle leads series, 2–1

Seattle Center Coliseum, Seattle, Washington
Attendance: 14,252
Referees: Dick Bavetta, Steve Javie, Lee Jones

- Gary Payton's famous alley-oop to Shawn Kemp.

TNT

April 30
10:30 PM

Boxscore

Golden State Warriors 116, Seattle SuperSonics 119
Scoring by quarter: 35–34, 25–24, 26–30, 30–31
Pts: Tim Hardaway 27; Rebs: Chris Gatling 12; Asts: Tim Hardaway 11	Pts: Ricky Pierce 27; Rebs: Shawn Kemp 20; Asts: Nate McMillan 10
Seattle wins series, 3–1

Seattle Center Coliseum, Seattle, Washington
Attendance: 14,252
Referees: Dan Crawford, Bernie Fryer, Jake O'Donnell

- Shawn Kemp's famous dunk on Alton Lister.

Regular-season series
Golden State won 3–2 in the regular-season series

November 26, 1991

Recap

Golden State Warriors 130, Seattle SuperSonics 136 (OT)

Seattle Center Coliseum, Seattle

December 21, 1991

Recap

Golden State Warriors 112, Seattle SuperSonics 120

Seattle Center Coliseum, Seattle

February 15, 1992

Recap

Seattle SuperSonics 122, Golden State Warriors 140

Oakland–Alameda County Coliseum Arena, Oakland, California

March 17, 1992

Recap

Golden State Warriors 119, Seattle SuperSonics 107

Seattle Center Coliseum, Seattle

April 19, 1992

Recap

Seattle SuperSonics 106, Golden State Warriors 108

Oakland–Alameda County Coliseum Arena, Oakland, California

This was the second playoff meeting between these two teams, with the Warriors winning the first meeting.

Previous playoff series
Golden State leads 1–0 in all-time playoff series

1975

Golden State Warriors 4, Seattle SuperSonics 2

1975 Western Conference Semifinals

==== (4) Phoenix Suns vs. (5) San Antonio Spurs ====
ASPN

April 24
9:00 PM

Boxscore

San Antonio Spurs 111, Phoenix Suns 117
Scoring by quarter: 36–27, 25–27, 23–39, 27–24
Pts: Terry Cummings 30; Rebs: Terry Cummings 12; Asts: Rod Strickland 9	Pts: Dan Majerle 25; Rebs: Cedric Ceballos 9 Asts: Kevin Johnson 17
Phoenix leads series, 1–0

Arizona Veterans Memorial Coliseum, Phoenix, Arizona
Attendance: 14,498
Referees: Dick Bavetta, Jim Clark, Steve Javie

TNT

April 26
9:30 PM

Boxscore

San Antonio Spurs 107, Phoenix Suns 119
Scoring by quarter: 22–29, 27–31, 29–31, 29–28
Pts: Terry Cummings 31; Rebs: Terry Cummings 10; Asts: Rod Strickland 10	Pts: Perry, Hornacek 31 each Rebs: Perry, Lang 10 each Asts: Kevin Johnson 19
Phoenix leads series, 2–0

Arizona Veterans Memorial Coliseum, Phoenix, Arizona
Attendance: 14,496
Referees: Bob Delaney, Jess Kersey, Jack Nies

Home Sports Entertainment

April 29
8:30 PM

Boxscore

Phoenix Suns 101, San Antonio Spurs 92
Scoring by quarter: 22–27, 31–23, 24–20, 24–22
Pts: Johnson, Hornacek 22 each Rebs: Tim Perry 9 Asts: Kevin Johnson 11	Pts: Antoine Carr 20; Rebs: Cummings, Carr 12 each Asts: three players 5 each
Phoenix wins series, 3–0

HemisFair Arena, San Antonio, Texas
Attendance: 14,853
Referees: Nolan Fine, Joe Forte, Darell Garretson

Regular-season series
Phoenix won 3–1 in the regular-season series

December 13, 1991

Recap

Phoenix Suns 112, San Antonio Spurs 107

HemisFair Arena, San Antonio

December 20, 1991

Recap

San Antonio Spurs 91, Phoenix Suns 116

Arizona Veterans Memorial Coliseum, Phoenix, Arizona

March 7, 1992

Recap

Phoenix Suns 109, San Antonio Spurs 122

HemisFair Arena, San Antonio

April 16, 1992

Recap

San Antonio Spurs 101, Phoenix Suns 121

Arizona Veterans Memorial Coliseum, Phoenix, Arizona

This was the first playoff meeting between the Suns and the Spurs.

== Conference semifinals ==
=== Eastern Conference semifinals ===
==== (1) Chicago Bulls vs. (4) New York Knicks ====
TNT

May 5
8:00 PM

Boxscore

New York Knicks 94, Chicago Bulls 89
Scoring by quarter: 25–16, 21–22, 27–26, 21–25
Pts: Patrick Ewing 34; Rebs: Patrick Ewing 16; Asts: Patrick Ewing 5	Pts: Michael Jordan 31; Rebs: Pippen, Cartwright 8 each Asts: Scottie Pippen 9
New York leads series, 1–0

Chicago Stadium, Chicago, Illinois
Attendance: 18,676
Referees: Ron Garretson, Ed Middleton, Ed T. Rush

- The Knicks' only playoff victory in Chicago to date.

TNT

May 7
8:00 PM

Boxscore

New York Knicks 78, Chicago Bulls 86
Scoring by quarter: 24–27, 13–19, 17–18, 24–22
Pts: Patrick Ewing 16; Rebs: Patrick Ewing 16; Asts: Wilkins, Anthony 4 each	Pts: Michael Jordan 27; Rebs: Horace Grant 11; Asts: John Paxson 7
Series tied, 1–1

Chicago Stadium, Chicago, Illinois
Attendance: 18,676
Referees: Mike Mathis, Paul Mihalak, Don Vaden

NBC

May 9
1:00 PM

Boxscore

Chicago Bulls 94, New York Knicks 86
Scoring by quarter: 32–23, 19–27, 20–14, 23–22
Pts: Michael Jordan 32; Rebs: Horace Grant 13; Asts: John Paxson 4	Pts: Patrick Ewing 27; Rebs: Patrick Ewing 11; Asts: Mark Jackson 8
Chicago leads series, 2–1

Madison Square Garden, New York City, New York
Attendance: 19,763
Referees: Bob Delaney, Darell Garretson, Steve Javie

NBC

May 10
6:30 PM

Boxscore

Chicago Bulls 86, New York Knicks 93
Scoring by quarter: 25–27, 24–20, 18–19, 19–27
Pts: Michael Jordan 29; Rebs: Scottie Pippen 8 Asts: Scottie Pippen 7	Pts: Xavier McDaniel 24; Rebs: Charles Oakley 12; Asts: John Starks 5
Series tied, 2–2

Madison Square Garden, New York City, New York
Attendance: 19,763
Referees: Dick Bavetta, Bernie Fryer, Bill Oakes

TNT

May 12
8:00 PM

Boxscore

New York Knicks 88, Chicago Bulls 96
Scoring by quarter: 18–22, 26–25, 23–24, 21–25
Pts: Xavier McDaniel 26; Rebs: Ewing, Oakley 7 each Asts: Mark Jackson 12	Pts: Michael Jordan 37; Rebs: Scottie Pippen 10; Asts: Scottie Pippen 8
Chicago leads series, 3–2

Chicago Stadium, Chicago, Illinois
Attendance: 18,676
Referees: Hugh Evans, Lee Jones, Jack Nies

TNT

May 14
8:00 PM

Boxscore

Chicago Bulls 86, New York Knicks 100
Scoring by quarter: 17–24, 28–29, 25–15, 16–32
Pts: Michael Jordan 21; Rebs: Scottie Pippen 10; Asts: Michael Jordan 8	Pts: Patrick Ewing 27; Rebs: Xavier McDaniel 11; Asts: Mark Jackson 15
Series tied, 3–3

Madison Square Garden, New York City, New York
Attendance: 19,763
Referees: Joe Crawford, Joe Forte, Jess Kersey

NBC

May 17
4:30 PM

Boxscore

New York Knicks 81, Chicago Bulls 110
Scoring by quarter: 25–30, 26–26, 13–23, 17–31
Pts: Patrick Ewing 22; Rebs: Charles Oakley 10; Asts: Mark Jackson 11	Pts: Michael Jordan 42; Rebs: Scottie Pippen 11; Asts: Scottie Pippen 11
Chicago wins series, 4–3

Chicago Stadium, Chicago, Illinois
Attendance: 18,676
Referees: Hue Hollins, Jake O'Donnell, Ed T. Rush

- This game featured Michael Jordan's famous steal and strip.

Regular-season series
Chicago won 4–0 in the regular-season series

December 13, 1991

Recap

New York Knicks 89, Chicago Bulls 99

Chicago Stadium, Chicago, Illinois

February 13, 1992

Recap

Chicago Bulls 106, New York Knicks 85

Madison Square Garden, New York City

February 15, 1992

Recap

New York Knicks 98, Chicago Bulls 99

Chicago Stadium, Chicago, Illinois

March 31, 1992

Recap

Chicago Bulls 96, New York Knicks 90

Madison Square Garden, New York City

This was the fourth playoff meeting between these two teams, with the Bulls winning the first three meetings.

Previous playoff series
Chicago leads 3–0 in all-time playoff series

1981

Chicago Bulls 2, New York Knicks 0

1981 Eastern Conference First Round

1989

Chicago Bulls 4, New York Knicks 2

1989 Eastern Conference Semifinals

1991

Chicago Bulls 3, New York Knicks 0

1991 Eastern Conference First Round

==== (2) Boston Celtics vs. (3) Cleveland Cavaliers ====
NBC

May 2
1:00 PM

Boxscore

Boston Celtics 76, Cleveland Cavaliers 101
Scoring by quarter: 24–26, 18–21, 19–29, 15–25
Pts: Kevin Gamble 22; Rebs: Ed Pinckney 10; Asts: John Bagley 8	Pts: Brad Daugherty 26; Rebs: Brad Daugherty 17; Asts: Mark Price 7
Cleveland leads series, 1–0

Richfield Coliseum, Richfield, Ohio
Attendance: 17,496
Referees: Bob Delaney, Steve Javie, Jess Kersey

TNT

May 4
8:00 PM

Boxscore

Boston Celtics 104, Cleveland Cavaliers 98
Scoring by quarter: 30–27, 24–28, 21–21, 29–22
Pts: Robert Parish 27; Rebs: Robert Parish 8 Asts: John Bagley 11	Pts: Brad Daugherty 22; Rebs: three players 9 each Asts: Mark Price 8
Series tied, 1–1

Richfield Coliseum, Richfield, Ohio
Attendance: 20,273
Referees: Dan Crawford, Hugh Evans, Greg Willard

TNT

May 8
8:00 PM

Boxscore

Cleveland Cavaliers 107, Boston Celtics 110
Scoring by quarter: 22–20, 26–28, 35–31, 24–31
Pts: Mark Price 27; Rebs: Larry Nance 12; Asts: Mark Price 10	Pts: Reggie Lewis 36; Rebs: Robert Parish 17; Asts: Reggie Lewis 7
Boston leads series, 2–1

Boston Garden, Boston, Massachusetts
Attendance: 14,890
Referees: Joe Forte, Bernie Fryer, Jake O'Donnell

NBC

May 10
12:30 PM

Boxscore

Cleveland Cavaliers 114, Boston Celtics 112 (OT)
Scoring by quarter: 26–27, 37–24, 20–29, 20–23, Overtime: 11–9
Pts: Larry Nance 32; Rebs: Craig Ehlo 9 Asts: Mark Price 12	Pts: Reggie Lewis 42; Rebs: Robert Parish 18; Asts: John Bagley 7
Series tied, 2–2

Boston Garden, Boston, Massachusetts
Attendance: 14,890
Referees: Lee Jones, Mike Mathis, Paul Mihalak

- Larry Nance hits the game-tying free throws with 29.3 seconds left to force OT.

TNT

May 13
8:00 PM

Boxscore

Boston Celtics 98, Cleveland Cavaliers 114
Scoring by quarter: 27–30, 22–26, 23–34, 26–24
Pts: Reggie Lewis 27; Rebs: Joe Kleine 11; Asts: John Bagley 5	Pts: Brad Daugherty 28; Rebs: Brad Daugherty 9 Asts: Craig Ehlo 13
Cleveland leads series, 3–2

Richfield Coliseum, Richfield, Ohio
Attendance: 20,273
Referees: Darell Garretson, Hue Hollins, Eddie F. Rush

TNT

May 15
8:00 PM

Boxscore

Cleveland Cavaliers 91, Boston Celtics 122
Scoring by quarter: 22–34, 31–28, 20–27, 18–33
Pts: Hot Rod Williams 18; Rebs: Hot Rod Williams 11; Asts: Mark Price 5	Pts: Reggie Lewis 26; Rebs: Dee Brown 8 Asts: Larry Bird 14
Series tied, 3–3

Boston Garden, Boston, Massachusetts
Attendance: 14,890
Referees: Ron Garretson, Bill Oakes, Ed T. Rush

NBC

May 17
2:00 PM

Boxscore

Boston Celtics 104, Cleveland Cavaliers 122
Scoring by quarter: 21–35, 26–30, 24–30, 33–27
Pts: Reggie Lewis 22; Rebs: Ed Pinckney 9 Asts: Bagley, Brown 5 each	Pts: Brad Daugherty 28; Rebs: Nance, Daugherty 9 each Asts: Nance, Price 8 each
Cleveland wins series, 4–3

Richfield Coliseum, Richfield, Ohio
Attendance: 20,273
Referees: Joe Crawford, Hugh Evans, Jess Kersey

- Larry Bird's final NBA game.

Regular-season series
Boston won 3–1 in the regular-season series

January 3, 1992

Recap

Cleveland Cavaliers 111, Boston Celtics 100

Boston Garden, Boston

January 20, 1992

Recap

Boston Celtics 107, Cleveland Cavaliers 102

The Coliseum, Richfield, Ohio

March 18, 1992

Recap

Cleveland Cavaliers 94, Boston Celtics 96

Boston Garden, Boston

April 7, 1992

Recap

Boston Celtics 100, Cleveland Cavaliers 97

The Coliseum, Richfield, Ohio

This was the third playoff meeting between these two teams, with the Celtics winning the first two meetings.

Previous playoff series
Boston leads 2–0 in all-time playoff series

1976

Boston Celtics 4, Cleveland Cavaliers 2

1976 Eastern Conference Finals

1985

Boston Celtics 3, Cleveland Cavaliers 1

1985 Eastern Conference First Round

=== Western Conference semifinals ===
==== (1) Portland Trail Blazers vs. (4) Phoenix Suns ====
TNT

May 5
10:30 PM

Boxscore

Phoenix Suns 111, Portland Trail Blazers 113
Scoring by quarter: 23–28, 33–30, 30–28, 25–27
Pts: Kevin Johnson 24; Rebs: Johnson, Chambers 8 each Asts: Jeff Hornacek 12	Pts: Terry Porter 31; Rebs: Clyde Drexler 10; Asts: Terry Porter 7
Portland leads series, 1–0

Memorial Coliseum, Portland, Oregon
Attendance: 12,888
Referees: Dick Bavetta, Bernie Fryer, Tommy Nunez Sr.

TNT

May 7
10:30 PM

Boxscore

Phoenix Suns 119, Portland Trail Blazers 126
Scoring by quarter: 16–35, 33–21, 39–32, 31–38
Pts: Kevin Johnson 35; Rebs: Jeff Hornacek 11; Asts: Dan Majerle 6	Pts: Porter, Drexler 27 each Rebs: Jerome Kersey 9 Asts: Clyde Drexler 13
Portland leads series, 2–0

Memorial Coliseum, Portland, Oregon
Attendance: 12,888
Referees: Joe Crawford, Ronnie Nunn, Bill Oakes

NBC

May 9
3:30 PM

Boxscore

Portland Trail Blazers 117, Phoenix Suns 124
Scoring by quarter: 26–37, 26–21, 29–31, 36–35
Pts: Clyde Drexler 37; Rebs: Jerome Kersey 9 Asts: Terry Porter 11	Pts: Jeff Hornacek 30; Rebs: Perry, Majerle 9 each Asts: Kevin Johnson 16
Portland leads series, 2–1

Arizona Veterans Memorial Coliseum, Phoenix, Arizona
Attendance: 14,496
Referees: Hugh Evans, Ed Middleton, Eddie F. Rush

TNT

May 11
9:00 PM

Boxscore

Portland Trail Blazers 153, Phoenix Suns 151 (2OT)
Scoring by quarter: 42–29, 32–36, 30–35, 23–27, Overtime: 13–13, 13–11
Pts: Clyde Drexler 33; Rebs: Jerome Kersey 10; Asts: Terry Porter 14	Pts: Kevin Johnson 35; Rebs: Dan Majerle 11; Asts: Kevin Johnson 14
Portland leads series, 3–1

Arizona Veterans Memorial Coliseum, Phoenix, Arizona
Attendance: 14,496
Referees: Hue Hollins, Jess Kersey, Greg Willard

- Terry Porter hits the game-tying 3-point play with 33.6 seconds left in regulation to force the first OT; Kevin Johnson hits the game-tying jumper with 2.7 seconds left in the first OT to force the second OT.

TNT

May 14
10:30 PM

Boxscore

Phoenix Suns 106, Portland Trail Blazers 118
Scoring by quarter: 31–35, 27–36, 27–22, 21–25
Pts: Perry, Chambers 19 each Rebs: Tom Chambers 8 Asts: Kevin Johnson 6	Pts: Clyde Drexler 34; Rebs: Kersey, Williams 12 each Asts: Drexler, Kersey 8 each
Portland wins series, 4–1

Memorial Coliseum, Portland, Oregon
Attendance: 12,888
Referees: Dan Crawford, Steve Javie, Jake O'Donnell

Regular-season series
Phoenix won 3–2 in the regular-season series

November 2, 1991

Recap

Phoenix Suns 100, Portland Trail Blazers 76

Memorial Coliseum, Portland, Oregon

January 19, 1992

Recap

Portland Trail Blazers 128, Phoenix Suns 132 (OT)

Arizona Veterans Memorial Coliseum, Phoenix, Arizona

February 12, 1992

Recap

Portland Trail Blazers 107, Phoenix Suns 97

Arizona Veterans Memorial Coliseum, Phoenix, Arizona

February 18, 1992

Recap

Phoenix Suns 116, Portland Trail Blazers 129

Memorial Coliseum, Portland, Oregon

March 31, 1992

Recap

Portland Trail Blazers 111, Phoenix Suns 128

Arizona Veterans Memorial Coliseum, Phoenix, Arizona

This was the fourth playoff meeting between these two teams, with the Suns winning two of the first three meetings.

Previous playoff series
Phoenix leads 2–1 in all-time playoff series

1979

Phoenix Suns 2, Portland Trail Blazers 1

1979 Western Conference First Round

1984

Phoenix Suns 3, Portland Trail Blazers 2

1984 Western Conference First Round

1990

Phoenix Suns 2, Portland Trail Blazers 4

1990 Western Conference Finals

==== (2) Utah Jazz vs. (6) Seattle SuperSonics ====
TNT

May 6
9:00 PM

Boxscore

Seattle SuperSonics 100, Utah Jazz 108
Scoring by quarter: 25–29, 26–28, 23–16, 26–35
Pts: Derrick McKey 20; Rebs: Shawn Kemp 15; Asts: Nate McMillan 8	Pts: Karl Malone 30; Rebs: Karl Malone 10; Asts: John Stockton 15
Utah leads series, 1–0

Delta Center, Salt Lake City, Utah
Attendance: 19,911
Referees: Terry Durham, Hugh Evans, Eddie F. Rush

TNT

May 8
10:30 PM

Boxscore

Seattle SuperSonics 97, Utah Jazz 103
Scoring by quarter: 23–21, 29–30, 16–25, 29–27
Pts: Eddie Johnson 26; Rebs: Shawn Kemp 9 Asts: Pierce, Payton 3 each	Pts: Karl Malone 28; Rebs: Karl Malone 12; Asts: John Stockton 14
Utah leads series, 2–0

Delta Center, Salt Lake City, Utah
Attendance: 19,911
Referees: Ron Garretson, Hue Hollins, Jess Kersey

NBC

May 10
3:00 PM

Boxscore

Utah Jazz 98, Seattle SuperSonics 104
Scoring by quarter: 29–22, 24–24, 28–32, 17–26
Pts: Karl Malone 30; Rebs: Karl Malone 8 Asts: John Stockton 11	Pts: Ricky Pierce 31; Rebs: Benoit Benjamin 8 Asts: Payton, McMillan 6 each
Utah leads series, 2–1

Seattle Center Coliseum, Seattle, Washington
Attendance: 14,104
Referees: Jack Nies, Ronnie Nunn, Ed T. Rush

TNT

May 12
10:30 PM

Boxscore

Utah Jazz 89, Seattle SuperSonics 83
Scoring by quarter: 24–16, 20–25, 28–24, 17–18
Pts: Jeff Malone 24; Rebs: Karl Malone 8 Asts: John Stockton 13	Pts: Ricky Pierce 21; Rebs: Shawn Kemp 11; Asts: Nate McMillan 9
Utah leads series, 3–1

Seattle Center Coliseum, Seattle, Washington
Attendance: 14,252
Referees: Dan Crawford, Tommy Nunez Sr., Jake O'Donnell

Prime Sports Intermountain West

May 14
9:00 PM

Boxscore

Seattle SuperSonics 100, Utah Jazz 111
Scoring by quarter: 36–29, 24–35, 24–15, 16–32
Pts: Eddie Johnson 26; Rebs: Michael Cage 11; Asts: Nate McMillan 12	Pts: Karl Malone 37; Rebs: Karl Malone 13; Asts: John Stockton 17
Utah wins series, 4–1

Delta Center, Salt Lake City, Utah
Attendance: 19,911
Referees: Mike Mathis, Paul Mihalak, Greg Willard

Regular-season series
Seattle won 3–1 in the regular-season series

November 7, 1991

Recap

Seattle SuperSonics 103, Utah Jazz 95

Delta Center, Salt Lake City

January 25, 1992

Recap

Utah Jazz 104, Seattle SuperSonics 103

Seattle Center Coliseum, Seattle

February 27, 1992

Recap

Seattle SuperSonics 130, Utah Jazz 124 (OT)

Delta Center, Salt Lake City

March 31, 1992

Recap

Utah Jazz 103, Seattle SuperSonics 122

Seattle Center Coliseum, Seattle

This was the first playoff meeting between the SuperSonics and the Jazz.

== Conference finals ==
=== Eastern Conference finals ===
==== (1) Chicago Bulls vs. (3) Cleveland Cavaliers ====
TNT

May 19
8:00 PM

Boxscore

Cleveland Cavaliers 89, Chicago Bulls 103
Scoring by quarter: 21–30, 19–22, 25–24, 24–27
Pts: Brad Daugherty 23; Rebs: Larry Nance 12; Asts: Mark Price 9	Pts: Michael Jordan 33; Rebs: Scottie Pippen 12; Asts: Scottie Pippen 9
Chicago leads series, 1–0

Chicago Stadium, Chicago, Illinois
Attendance: 18,676
Referees: Mike Mathis, Paul Mihalak, Jack Nies

TNT

May 21
8:00 PM

Boxscore

Cleveland Cavaliers 107, Chicago Bulls 81
Scoring by quarter: 30–14, 29–19, 18–17, 30–31
Pts: Brad Daugherty 28; Rebs: Brad Daugherty 9 Asts: Ehlo, Price 7 each	Pts: Michael Jordan 20; Rebs: Horace Grant 12; Asts: four players 3 each
Series tied, 1–1

Chicago Stadium, Chicago, Illinois
Attendance: 18,676
Referees: Dan Crawford, Joe Forte, Darell Garretson

NBC

May 23
3:30 PM

Boxscore

Chicago Bulls 105, Cleveland Cavaliers 96
Scoring by quarter: 37–18, 20–19, 26–29, 22–30
Pts: Michael Jordan 36; Rebs: Horace Grant 11; Asts: Michael Jordan 9	Pts: Craig Ehlo 20; Rebs: Brad Daugherty 10; Asts: Daugherty, Ehlo 5 each
Chicago leads series, 2–1

Richfield Coliseum, Richfield, Ohio
Attendance: 20,273
Referees: Dick Bavetta, Steve Javie, Jake O'Donnell

NBC

May 25
3:30 PM

Boxscore

Chicago Bulls 85, Cleveland Cavaliers 99
Scoring by quarter: 24–30, 19–25, 17–16, 25–28
Pts: Michael Jordan 35; Rebs: Horace Grant 15; Asts: Michael Jordan 6	Pts: Larry Nance 22; Rebs: Brad Daugherty 14; Asts: Brad Daugherty 6
Series tied, 2–2

Richfield Coliseum, Richfield, Ohio
Attendance: 20,273
Referees: Hugh Evans, Jess Kersey, Eddie F. Rush

NBC

May 27
9:00 PM

Boxscore

Cleveland Cavaliers 89, Chicago Bulls 112
Scoring by quarter: 20–22, 18–24, 33–27, 18–39
Pts: Mark Price 24; Rebs: Hot Rod Williams 11; Asts: Ehlo, Price 3 each	Pts: Michael Jordan 37; Rebs: Scottie Pippen 15; Asts: Scottie Pippen 6
Chicago leads series, 3–2

Chicago Stadium, Chicago, Illinois
Attendance: 18,676
Referees: Hue Hollins, Lee Jones, Ed T. Rush

NBC

May 29
9:00 PM

Boxscore

Chicago Bulls 99, Cleveland Cavaliers 94
Scoring by quarter: 26–21, 19–24, 27–27, 27–22
Pts: Jordan, Pippen 29 each Rebs: Scottie Pippen 12; Asts: Michael Jordan 8	Pts: Larry Nance 25; Rebs: Larry Nance 16; Asts: Mark Price 8
Chicago wins series, 4–2

Richfield Coliseum, Richfield, Ohio
Attendance: 20,273
Referees: Joe Crawford, Paul Mihalak, Bill Oakes

Regular-season series
Chicago won 3–2 in the regular-season series

December 4, 1991

Recap

Cleveland Cavaliers 102, Chicago Bulls 108

Chicago Stadium, Chicago, Illinois

January 16, 1992

Recap

Chicago Bulls 100, Cleveland Cavaliers 85

The Coliseum, Richfield, Ohio

February 17, 1992

Recap

Cleveland Cavaliers 113, Chicago Bulls 112

Chicago Stadium, Chicago, Illinois

March 28, 1992

Recap

Cleveland Cavaliers 102, Chicago Bulls 126

Chicago Stadium, Chicago, Illinois

April 14, 1992

Recap

Chicago Bulls 100, Cleveland Cavaliers 115

The Coliseum, Richfield, Ohio

This was the third playoff meeting between these two teams, with the Bulls winning the first two meetings.

Previous playoff series
Chicago leads 2–0 in all-time playoff series

1988

Chicago Bulls 3, Cleveland Cavaliers 2

1988 Eastern Conference First Round

1989

Chicago Bulls 3, Cleveland Cavaliers 2

1989 Eastern Conference First Round

=== Western Conference finals ===
==== (1) Portland Trail Blazers vs. (2) Utah Jazz ====
NBC

May 16
3:30 PM

Boxscore

Utah Jazz 88, Portland Trail Blazers 113
Scoring by quarter: 19–37, 18–28, 28–28, 23–20
Pts: Jeff Malone 15; Rebs: K. Malone, Thornton 7 each Asts: John Stockton 9	Pts: Terry Porter 26; Rebs: Buck Williams 8 Asts: Drexler, Porter 8 each
Portland leads series, 1–0

Memorial Coliseum, Portland, Oregon
Attendance: 12,888
Referees: Dick Bavetta, Darell Garretson, Eddie F. Rush

TNT

May 19
10:30 PM

Boxscore

Utah Jazz 102, Portland Trail Blazers 119
Scoring by quarter: 27–29, 24–35, 33–30, 18–25
Pts: Karl Malone 25; Rebs: Karl Malone 11; Asts: John Stockton 11	Pts: Terry Porter 41; Rebs: Duckworth, Robinson 7 each Asts: Clyde Drexler 12
Portland leads series, 2–0

Memorial Coliseum, Portland, Oregon
Attendance: 12,888
Referees: Hugh Evans, Lee Jones, Bill Oakes

TNT

May 22
9:00 PM

Boxscore

Portland Trail Blazers 89, Utah Jazz 97
Scoring by quarter: 25–22, 26–21, 18–28, 20–26
Pts: Drexler, Kersey 26 each Rebs: Kersey, Williams 9 each Asts: Drexler, Porter 7 each	Pts: Karl Malone 39; Rebs: K. Malone, Eaton 7 each Asts: John Stockton 10
Portland leads series, 2–1

Delta Center, Salt Lake City, Utah
Attendance: 19,911
Referees: Ron Garretson, Jess Kersey, Ed T. Rush

NBC

May 24
3:30 PM

Boxscore

Portland Trail Blazers 112, Utah Jazz 121
Scoring by quarter: 27–27, 29–37, 27–24, 29–33
Pts: Terry Porter 34; Rebs: Jerome Kersey 8 Asts: Terry Porter 7	Pts: Karl Malone 33; Rebs: Karl Malone 12; Asts: John Stockton 15
Series tied, 2–2

Delta Center, Salt Lake City, Utah
Attendance: 19,911
Referees: Joe Crawford, Hue Hollins, Jack Nies

NBC

May 26
9:00 PM

Boxscore

Utah Jazz 121, Portland Trail Blazers 127 (OT)
Scoring by quarter: 22–32, 30–28, 32–24, 23–23, Overtime: 14–20
Pts: Karl Malone 38; Rebs: Karl Malone 14; Asts: John Stockton 10	Pts: Jerome Kersey 29; Rebs: Buck Williams 12; Asts: Terry Porter 12
Portland leads series, 3–2

Memorial Coliseum, Portland, Oregon
Attendance: 12,888
Referees: Dan Crawford, Paul Mihalak, Jake O'Donnell

- Delaney Rudd hits the game-tying 3 with 5.5 seconds left to force OT.

NBC

May 28
9:00 PM

Boxscore

Portland Trail Blazers 105, Utah Jazz 97
Scoring by quarter: 30–33, 25–26, 22–18, 28–20
Pts: three players 18 each Rebs: Buck Williams 8 Asts: Terry Porter 10	Pts: Karl Malone 23; Rebs: Karl Malone 19; Asts: John Stockton 12
Portland wins series, 4–2

Delta Center, Salt Lake City, Utah
Attendance: 19,911
Referees: Darell Garretson, Steve Javie, Mike Mathis

Regular-season series
Tied 2–2 in the regular-season series

January 2, 1992

Recap

Portland Trail Blazers 103, Utah Jazz 107

Delta Center, Salt Lake City

February 24, 1992

Recap

Utah Jazz 107, Portland Trail Blazers 110

Memorial Coliseum, Portland, Oregon

March 21, 1992

Recap

Portland Trail Blazers 77, Utah Jazz 95

Delta Center, Salt Lake City

April 2, 1992

Recap

Utah Jazz 86, Portland Trail Blazers 118

Memorial Coliseum, Portland, Oregon

This was the third playoff meeting between these two teams, with each team winning one series apiece.

Previous playoff series
Tied 1–1 in all-time playoff series

1988

Portland Trail Blazers 1, Utah Jazz 3

1988 Western Conference First Round

1991

Portland Trail Blazers 4, Utah Jazz 1

1991 Western Conference Semifinals

== NBA Finals: (E1) Chicago Bulls vs. (W1) Portland Trail Blazers ==
NBC

June 3
9:00 PM

Boxscore

Portland Trail Blazers 89, Chicago Bulls 122
Scoring by quarter: 30–33, 21–33, 17–38, 21–18
Pts: Drexler, Robinson 16 each Rebs: Jerome Kersey 7 Asts: Clyde Drexler 7	Pts: Michael Jordan 39; Rebs: Pippen, Williams 9 each Asts: Michael Jordan 11
Chicago leads series, 1–0

Chicago Stadium, Chicago, Illinois
Attendance: 18,676
Referees: Jake O'Donnell, Hue Hollins, Dick Bavetta

- Michael Jordan scores 35 points in the first half, along with a then-record six 3-pointers.

NBC

June 5
9:00 PM

Boxscore

Portland Trail Blazers 115, Chicago Bulls 104 (OT)
Scoring by quarter: 31–23, 23–22, 16–32, 27–20, Overtime: 18–7
Pts: Clyde Drexler 26; Rebs: Buck Williams 14; Asts: Clyde Drexler 8	Pts: Michael Jordan 39; Rebs: Horace Grant 12; Asts: Jordan, Pippen 10 each
Series tied, 1–1

Chicago Stadium, Chicago, Illinois
Attendance: 18,676
Referees: Hugh Evans, Jess Kersey, Paul Mihalik

- Kevin Duckworth hits the game-tying shot with 17.3 seconds left.

NBC

June 7
7:00 PM

Boxscore

Chicago Bulls 94, Portland Trail Blazers 84
Scoring by quarter: 34–26, 20–19, 16–15, 24–24
Pts: Michael Jordan 26; Rebs: Grant, Pippen 8 each Asts: Scottie Pippen 7	Pts: Clyde Drexler 32; Rebs: Jerome Kersey 12; Asts: Terry Porter 4
Chicago leads series, 2–1

Memorial Coliseum, Portland, Oregon
Attendance: 12,888
Referees: Ed T. Rush, Mike Mathis, Bill Oakes

NBC

June 10
9:00 PM

Boxscore

Chicago Bulls 88, Portland Trail Blazers 93
Scoring by quarter: 26–18, 22–27, 21–21, 19–27
Pts: Michael Jordan 32; Rebs: Horace Grant 10; Asts: Jordan, Pippen 6 each	Pts: Drexler, Kersey 21 each Rebs: Kevin Duckworth 11; Asts: Clyde Drexler 9
Series tied, 2–2

Memorial Coliseum, Portland, Oregon
Attendance: 12,888
Referees: Darell Garretson, Joe Crawford, Dick Bavetta

NBC

June 12
9:00 PM

Boxscore

Chicago Bulls 119, Portland Trail Blazers 106
Scoring by quarter: 39–26, 27–28, 28–24, 25–28
Pts: Michael Jordan 46; Rebs: Scottie Pippen 11; Asts: Scottie Pippen 9	Pts: Clyde Drexler 30; Rebs: Jerome Kersey 12; Asts: Terry Porter 8
Chicago leads series, 3–2

Memorial Coliseum, Portland, Oregon
Attendance: 12,888
Referees: Jake O'Donnell, Jess Kersey, Hue Hollins

NBC

June 14
7:00 PM

Boxscore

Portland Trail Blazers 93, Chicago Bulls 97
Scoring by quarter: 25–19, 25–25, 29–20, 14–33
Pts: Drexler, Kersey 24 each Rebs: Jerome Kersey 9 Asts: Terry Porter 8	Pts: Michael Jordan 33; Rebs: Scott Williams 8 Asts: Horace Grant 5
Chicago wins series, 4–2

Chicago Stadium, Chicago, Illinois
Attendance: 18,676
Referees: Hugh Evans, Ed T. Rush, Mike Mathis

- Chicago overcomes a 79–64 deficit at the start of the 4th quarter to win their second straight title.

Regular-season series
Chicago won 2–0 in the regular-season series

November 29, 1991

Recap

Chicago Bulls 116, Portland Trail Blazers 114 (2OT)

Memorial Coliseum, Portland, Oregon

March 1, 1992

Recap

Portland Trail Blazers 91, Chicago Bulls 111

Chicago Stadium, Chicago, Illinois

This was the second playoff meeting between these two teams, with the Trail Blazers winning the first meeting.

Previous playoff series
Portland leads 1–0 in all-time playoff series

1977

Chicago Bulls 1, Portland Trail Blazers 2

1977 Western Conference First Round

== Statistical leaders ==
Category	Game high			Average			
Category	Player	Team	High	Player	Team	Avg.	GP
Points	Michael Jordan	Chicago Bulls	56	Michael Jordan	Chicago Bulls	34.5	22
Rebounds	Shawn Kemp	Seattle SuperSonics	20	Detlef Schrempf	Indiana Pacers	13.0	3
Assists	John Stockton	Utah Jazz	21	John Stockton	Utah Jazz	13.6	16
Steals	Tim Hardaway	Golden State Warriors	8	Mookie Blaylock	New Jersey Nets	3.8	4
Blocks	Antoine Carr	San Antonio Spurs	7	Antoine Carr	San Antonio Spurs	3.7	3
