= Big East Conference Men's Basketball Defensive Player of the Year =

Annual basketball award

- Awarded for: the best defensive basketball player in the Big East Conference
- Country: United States

History
- First award: 1982
- Most recent: Zuby Ejiofor, St. John's

The Big East Conference Men's Basketball Defensive Player of the Year award is given to the men's basketball player in the Big East Conference voted as the top defender by the conference coaches. It was first awarded at the end of the 1981–82 season.

== Key ==
| † | Co-Defensive Players of the Year |
| Player (X) | Denotes the number of times the player has been awarded the Big East Defensive Player of the Year award at that point |

== Winners ==
| Season | Player | School | Position | Class |
|---|---|---|---|---|
| 1981–82 | Patrick Ewing | Georgetown | C | Freshman |
| 1982–83 | Patrick Ewing (2×) | Georgetown | C | Sophomore |
| 1983–84 | Patrick Ewing (3×) | Georgetown | C | Junior |
| 1984–85 | Patrick Ewing (4×) | Georgetown | C | Senior |
| 1985–86 | Harold Pressley | Villanova | SF | Senior |
| 1986–87 | Mark Jackson | St. John's | PG | Senior |
| 1987–88 | Gary Massey | Villanova | G/F | Junior |
| 1988–89 | Alonzo Mourning | Georgetown | C | Freshman |
| 1989–90^{†} | Alonzo Mourning (2×) | Georgetown | C | Sophomore |
| 1989–90^{†} | Dikembe Mutombo | Georgetown | C | Sophomore |
| 1990–91 | Dikembe Mutombo (2×) | Georgetown | C | Junior |
| 1991–92 | Alonzo Mourning (3×) | Georgetown | C | Senior |
| 1992–93 | Jerry Walker | Seton Hall | F | Senior |
| 1993–94 | Donyell Marshall | UConn | F | Junior |
| 1994–95 | Allen Iverson | Georgetown | G | Freshman |
| 1995–96 | Allen Iverson (2×) | Georgetown | G | Sophomore |
| 1996–97 | Jason Lawson | Villanova | C | Senior |
| 1997–98 | Damian Owens | West Virginia | SF | Senior |
| 1998–99 | Etan Thomas | Syracuse | F/C | Junior |
| 1999–00 | Etan Thomas (2×) | Syracuse | F/C | Senior |
| 2000–01 | John Linehan | Providence | PG | Junior |
| 2001–02 | John Linehan (2×) | Providence | PG | Senior |
| 2002–03 | Emeka Okafor | UConn | C | Sophomore |
| 2003–04 | Emeka Okafor (2×) | UConn | C | Junior |
| 2004–05 | Josh Boone | UConn | C | Sophomore |
| 2005–06 | Hilton Armstrong | UConn | C | Senior |
| 2006–07 | Jerel McNeal | Marquette | SG | Sophomore |
| 2007–08 | Hasheem Thabeet | UConn | C | Sophomore |
| 2008–09 | Hasheem Thabeet (2×) | UConn | C | Junior |
| 2009–10 | Hamady N'Diaye | Rutgers | C | Senior |
| 2010–11 | Rick Jackson | Syracuse | F/C | Senior |
| 2011–12 | Fab Melo | Syracuse | C | Sophomore |
| 2012–13 | Gorgui Dieng | Louisville | C | Junior |
| 2013–14 | Fuquan Edwin | Seton Hall | G/F | Senior |
| 2014–15^{†} | Kris Dunn | Providence | PG | Junior |
| 2014–15^{†} | Sir'Dominic Pointer | St. John's | SG | Senior |
| 2015–16 | Kris Dunn (2×) | Providence | PG | Senior |
| 2016–17^{†} | Mikal Bridges | Villanova | G/F | Sophomore |
| 2016–17^{†} | Josh Hart | Villanova | SG | Senior |
| 2016–17^{†} | Khyri Thomas | Creighton | SG | Sophomore |
| 2017–18 | Khyri Thomas (2×) | Creighton | SG | Junior |
| 2018–19 | Justin Simon | St. John's | SG | Senior |
| 2019–20 | Romaro Gill | Seton Hall | C | Senior |
| 2020–21^{†} | Isaiah Whaley | UConn | F/C | Senior |
| 2020–21^{†} | Posh Alexander | St. John's | PG | Freshman |
| 2021–22 | Ryan Kalkbrenner | Creighton | C | Sophomore |
| 2022–23 | Ryan Kalkbrenner (2×) | Creighton | C | Junior |
| 2023–24 | Ryan Kalkbrenner (3×) | Creighton | C | Senior |
| 2024–25 | Ryan Kalkbrenner (4×) | Creighton | C | Senior |
| 2025–26 | Zuby Ejiofor | St. John's | F/C | Senior |

== Winners by school ==
| School (year joined) | Winners | Years |
|---|---|---|
| Georgetown (1979) | 11 | 1982, 1983, 1984, 1985, 1989, 1990 (2×)^{†}, 1991, 1992, 1995, 1996 |
| UConn (1979/2020) (Note: When seven schools left the original Big East Conference in 2013 and formed a new basketball-centered Big East Conference, Cincinnati, Louisville, Rutgers, South Florida, and Connecticut (which rebranded itself as "UConn" that year) remained behind in the old, football-sponsoring conference, which renamed itself the American Athletic Conference, marketed as "The American." UConn moved from The American to the new Big East in 2020.) | 8 | 1994, 2003, 2004, 2005, 2006, 2008, 2009, 2021 |
| Creighton (2013) | 6 | 2017^{†}, 2018, 2022, 2023, 2024, 2025 |
| Villanova (1980) | 5 | 1986, 1988, 1997, 2017 (2×)^{†} |
| St. John's (1979) | 5 | 1987, 1985^{†}, 2019, 2021, 2026 |
| Providence (1979) | 4 | 2001, 2002, 2015^{†}, 2016 |
| Syracuse (1979) (Note: Notre Dame, Pittsburgh, and Syracuse left for the ACC in 2013.) | 4 | 1999, 2000, 2011, 2012 |
| Seton Hall (1979) | 3 | 1993, 2014, 2020 |
| Louisville (2005) | 1 | 2013 |
| Marquette (2005) | 1 | 2007 |
| Rutgers (1995) | 1 | 2010 |
| West Virginia (1995) (Note: West Virginia became an all-sports member of the Big East in 1995; it had also joined for football in 1991. The Mountaineers left for the Big 12 in 2012.) | 1 | 1998 |
