= 1982 Big East men's basketball tournament =

- Classification: Division I
- Season: 1981–82
- Teams: 8
- Site: Hartford Civic Center; Hartford, Connecticut
- Champions: Georgetown (2nd title)
- Winning coach: John Thompson (2nd title)
- MVP: Eric Floyd (Georgetown)

1981–82 Big East men's basketball standings
	Conf.				Overall
Team	W		L	PCT	W		L	PCT
Villanova	11	–	3	.786	24	–	8	.750
No. 6 Georgetown†	10	–	4	.714	30	–	7	.811
St. John's	9	–	5	.643	21	–	9	.700
Boston College	8	–	6	.571	22	–	10	.688
Syracuse	7	–	7	.500	16	–	13	.552
Connecticut	7	–	7	.500	17	–	11	.607
Providence	2	–	12	.143	10	–	17	.370
Seton Hall	2	–	12	.143	11	–	16	.407
† 1982 Big East tournament winner As of March 29, 1982; Rankings from AP Poll

The 1982 Big East men's basketball tournament took place at the Hartford Civic Center in Hartford, Connecticut. It is a single-elimination tournament with three rounds. Villanova had the best regular season conference record and received the #1 seed. It was also the last conference post-season tournament before moving to its permanent home, Madison Square Garden, the following season.

Georgetown defeated Villanova in the championship game 72–54, to claim its second Big East tournament Championship.

== Bracket ==
Quarterfinals
1	Villanova	88
8	Seton Hall	73
4	Boston College	94
5	Syracuse	92
2	#8 Georgetown	62
7	Providence	48
3	St. John's	54
6	Connecticut	52

Semifinals
1	Villanova	74
4	Boston College	71
2	#8 Georgetown	57
3	St. John's	42

Championship Game
1	Villanova	54
2	#8 Georgetown	72

== Awards ==
Most Valuable Player: Eric Floyd, Georgetown

All Tournament Team

- John Bagley, Boston College
- Patrick Ewing, Georgetown
- Eric Floyd, Georgetown
- Ed Pinckney, Villanova
- Leo Rautins, Syracuse
- Eric Smith, Georgetown
