= 1981–82 Gonzaga Bulldogs men's basketball team =

American college basketball season

1981–82 Gonzaga Bulldogs men's basketball
- Conference: West Coast Athletic Conference
- Record: 15–12 (7–7 WCAC)
- Head coach: Jay Hillock (1st season)
- Home arena: Kennedy Pavilion

1981–82 West Coast Athletic Conference men's basketball standings
	Conf.				Overall
Team	W		L	PCT	W		L	PCT
Pepperdine	14	–	0	1.000	22	–	7	.759
San Francisco	11	–	3	.786	26	–	5	.839
Portland	9	–	5	.643	17	–	10	.630
Santa Clara	7	–	7	.500	16	–	11	.593
Gonzaga	7	–	7	.500	15	–	12	.556
San Diego	4	–	10	.286	11	–	15	.423
Saint Mary's	3	–	11	.214	11	–	16	.407
Loyola Marymount	1	–	13	.071	3	–	24	.111
Rankings from AP Poll

The 1981–82 Gonzaga Bulldogs men's basketball team represented Gonzaga University in the West Coast Athletic Conference (WCAC) during the 1981–82 NCAA Division I men's basketball season. Led by newly-promoted first-year head coach Jay Hillock, the Bulldogs were 15–12 (.556) overall (7–7 in WCAC, tied for fourth), and played their home games on campus at Kennedy Pavilion in Spokane, Washington.

Point guard John Stockton was a sophomore this season, his first as a starter; the three seniors on the roster were forward Bill Dunlap, center Duane Bergeson, and guard Tim Wagoner.

For a second season, the GU cheerleaders were assisted at home games by Captain Zag (senior student and activities vice president Mike Griffin).
