= Dom Perno =

American basketball player and coach

Biographical details
- Born: December 18, 1941 (age 84); New Haven, Connecticut, U.S.

Playing career
- 1961–1964: UConn
- Position: Guard

Coaching career (HC unless noted)
- 1977–1986: UConn

Administrative career (AD unless noted)
- 1997–2011: George Washington (associate AD)

Head coaching record
- Overall: 139–114

Accomplishments and honors

Championships
- 1979 ECAC Tournament Championship

Awards
- 1964 UConn Club Award for Outstanding Senior Athlete 1979 Kodak District Basketball Coach of the Year University of Connecticut Outstanding Alumnus Award Dr. Martin (Red) O’Neal Award in recognition of distinguished achievements in the field of Athletic Administration University of Connecticut All Century Team

Dom Perno is an American former basketball coach and former associate athletic director at The George Washington University. He was head basketball coach at the University of Connecticut for nine seasons, from 1977 to 1986, compiling a 139–114 record, leading teams to the NCAA Division I men's basketball tournament and the National Invitation Tournament (NIT). He coached former George Washington head coach Karl Hobbs in college and recruited Rutgers Head Coach, Steve Pikiell to UConn. Before becoming head coach at UConn, he was head coach at St. Paul Catholic High School in Bristol, Connecticut, then assistant coach at UConn under Dee Rowe. He was followed at UConn by Jim Calhoun. After UConn, he worked in business and as a broadcaster before being hired by GW in 1997.

== High school career ==
As a player for Wilbur Cross High School in New Haven, Connecticut, Perno led his team to 49 consecutive wins and the New England Intercollegiate Basketball Tournament championship played at the Boston Garden. He was named to All-State in 1958-59 and considered attending Boston College and Fairfield University but committed to the University of Connecticut and coach Hugh Greer.

== College basketball career ==
Perno was a guard for the Huskies from 1960 to 1964 when the university was a member in the Yankee Conference, in which Connecticut won multiple conference championships. On March 14, 1964, Connecticut upset Princeton and star forward Bill Bradley, 52–50, at Cameron Indoor Stadium in the Sweet 16 of the 1964 NCAA tournament. The victory was sealed when Perno stole the ball from Bradley with 19 seconds to play.

== Coaching career ==
Following graduation, Perno coached at South Catholic High School in Hartford, Connecticut, and then at St. Paul Catholic High School in Bristol, Connecticut, where in addition to coaching boys basketball he was also the athletic director, dean of boys, and baseball coach. Jim Valvano convinced him to interview for the top assistant position at the University of Connecticut that Valvano was leaving for a head coaching job at Bucknell University. Perno took over for Valvano as top assistant to Donald ‘Dee’ Rowe, and after five years took over as the head coach. Perno was instrumental in elevating the Husky program with the inception of the Big East Conference in 1979.

Following Perno’s retirement from coaching he served as vice president for sales and marketing at the Dumont Group in Bristol, Connecticut, and as a color analyst for the Big East Network. In 1997, he accepted the associate athletic director position for development at The George Washington University in Washington, D.C. He retired in 2011.

== Personal life ==
Perno and his wife, Cindy, reside in Orange, Connecticut, and are the parents of Dom, Matt, and Holly Perno Smith and grandparents of Isabella, Phoebe, Nate, and JD.

== Head coaching record ==
Record table
Season	Team	Overall	Conference	Standing	Postseason
Connecticut Huskies (NCAA Division I independent) (1977–1979)
1977–78	Connecticut	11–15			
1978–79	Connecticut	21–8			NCAA Division I Second Round
Connecticut Huskies (Big East Conference) (1979–1986)
1979–80	Connecticut	20–9	3–3	4th	NIT First Round
1980–81	Connecticut	20–9	8–6	T–3rd	NIT Second Round
1981–82	Connecticut	17–11	7–7	T–5th	NIT First Round
1982–83	Connecticut	12–16	5–11	7th	
1983–84	Connecticut	13–15	5–11	T–7th	
1984–85	Connecticut	13–15	6–10	7th	
1985–86	Connecticut	12–16	3–13	T–8th	
Connecticut:		139–114 (.549)	37–61 (.378)		
Total:		139–114 (.549)			
National champion Postseason invitational champion Conference regular season champion Conference regular season and conference tournament champion Division regular season champion Division regular season and conference tournament champion Conference tournament champion
