= 1981–82 St. John's Redmen basketball team =

American college basketball season

1981–82 St. John's Redmen men's basketball

Lapchick Memorial Champions ECAC Holiday Festival Champions

1982 NCAA tournament, Second round
- Conference: Big East Conference (1979–2013)
- Record: 21–9 (9–5 Big East)
- Head coach: Lou Carnesecca
- Assistant coaches: Brian Mahoney; Al LoBalbo; Ron Rutledge
- Captains: David Russell; Trevor Jackson
- Home arena: Alumni Hall; Madison Square Garden

1981–82 Big East men's basketball standings
	Conf.				Overall
Team	W		L	PCT	W		L	PCT
Villanova	11	–	3	.786	24	–	8	.750
No. 6 Georgetown†	10	–	4	.714	30	–	7	.811
St. John's	9	–	5	.643	21	–	9	.700
Boston College	8	–	6	.571	22	–	10	.688
Syracuse	7	–	7	.500	16	–	13	.552
Connecticut	7	–	7	.500	17	–	11	.607
Providence	2	–	12	.143	10	–	17	.370
Seton Hall	2	–	12	.143	11	–	16	.407
† 1982 Big East tournament winner As of March 29, 1982; Rankings from AP Poll

The 1981–82 St. John's Redmen basketball team represented St. John's University during the 1981–82 NCAA Division I men's basketball season. The team was coached by Lou Carnesecca in his fourteenth year at the school. St. John's home games are played at Alumni Hall and Madison Square Garden and the team is a member of the Big East Conference.

== Roster ==
1981–82 St. John's Red Storm men's basketball team
Players
Coaches

Pos.	#	Name	Height	Weight	Year	Previous school	Hometown
F	-	Ray James	6 ft 7 in (2.01 m)	—	Sr	Alexander Hamilton	Brooklyn, NY
G	4	George Garrison	6 ft 1 in (1.85 m)	170 lb (77 kg)	Jr	Bellport	Bellport, NY
G	10	Bob Kelly	6 ft 2 in (1.88 m)	—	Jr	Delbarton/Holy Cross	South Orange, NJ
F	11	David Russell (C)	6 ft 7 in (2.01 m)	215 lb (98 kg)	Jr	Bellport	Bellport, NY
G	12	Kevin Williams	6 ft 3 in (1.91 m)	175 lb (79 kg)	Jr	Charles E. Hughes	New York, NY
G/F	14	Mark Calzonetti	6 ft 4 in (1.93 m)	180 lb (82 kg)	So	Paul VI	Woodbury, NJ
G/F	20	Chris Mullin	6 ft 6 in (1.98 m)	205 lb (93 kg)	Fr	Power Memorial/Xaverian	Brooklyn, NY
G	21	Larry Washington (injured)	6 ft 0 in (1.83 m)	160 lb (73 kg)	Sr	Canarsie/Texas Tech	Brooklyn, NY
F/C	22	Jeff Allen	6 ft 10 in (2.08 m)	235 lb (107 kg)	RS So	Norwalk/Rutgers	Norwalk, CT
C	23	Bill Wennington	7 ft 0 in (2.13 m)	245 lb (111 kg)	Fr	Long Island Lutheran	Wheatley Heights, NY
F/C	32	Trevor Jackson (C)	6 ft 8 in (2.03 m)	200 lb (91 kg)	Jr	Springfield Gardens	Rosedale, NY
F	33	Ron Stewart	6 ft 8 in (2.03 m)	212 lb (96 kg)	Fr	Brentwood	Brentwood, NY
G/F	35	Billy Goodwin	6 ft 5 in (1.96 m)	220 lb (100 kg)	Jr	Columbus/San Jacinto	Bronx, NY
F	42	Mike Feigenbaum	6 ft 6 in (1.98 m)	205 lb (93 kg)	RS So	Lawrence/Ohio/Wagner	Cedarhurst, NY

Head coach

- Lou Carnesecca (St. John's, '50)

Assistant coach(es)

- Brian Mahoney
- Al LoBalbo
- Ron Rutledge

Legend

- (C) Team captain
- (S) Suspended
- (I) Ineligible
- (W) Walk-on
- Injured
- Current redshirt

== Schedule and results ==
Date time, TV	Rank^{#}	Opponent^{#}	Result	Record	Site city, state
Regular season
11/27/81*		Xavier; Lapchick Tournament Opening Round	W 75-55	1-0	Alumni Hall; Queens, NY
11/28/81*		Fordham; Lapchick Tournament Championship	W 91-71	2-0	Alumni Hall; Queens, NY
12/5/81*		at Princeton	W 42-37	3-0	Jadwin Gymnasium; Princeton, NJ
11/28/81*		at Rutgers	L 67-74	3-1	Rutgers Athletic Center; Piscataway, NJ
12/12/81*		Manhattan	W 85-54	4-1	Alumni Hall; Queens, NY
12/19/81*		Fordham	W 72-59	5-1	Alumni Hall; Queens, NY
12/23/81*		Temple	W 68-61	6-1	Alumni Hall; Queens, NY
12/28/81*		vs. Kansas; ECAC Holiday Festival Semifinal	W 76-75	7-1	Madison Square Garden; New York, NY
12/29/81*		vs. No. 19 Villanova; ECAC Holiday Festival Championship	W 94-89	8-1	Madison Square Garden; New York, NY
01/02/82*		Columbia	W 58-51	9-1	Alumni Hall; Queens, NY
01/06/82	No. 20	No. 13 Georgetown	L 42-72	9-2 (0-1)	Madison Square Garden; New York, NY
01/09/82	No. 20	Providence	W 76-62	10-2 (1-1)	Nassau Coliseum; Uniondale, NY
01/11/82	No. 20	at Villanova	L 62-64	10-3 (1-2)	Villanova Field House; Villanova, PA
01/16/82		Connecticut	W 77-71	11-3 (2-2)	Alumni Hall; Queens, NY
01/20/82		Syracuse	W 73-62	12-3 (3-2)	Alumni Hall; Queens, NY
01/25/82		at Seton Hall	W 91-85	13-3 (4-2)	Walsh Gymnasium; South Orange, NJ
01/27/82*		vs. Army	W 67-54	14-3	Meadowlands Arena; East Rutherford, NJ
01/31/82		at Georgetown	L 46-63	14-4 (4-3)	Capital Centre; Landover, MD
02/03/82		at Boston College	W 71-70	15-4 (5-3)	Roberts Center; Chestnut Hill, MA
02/07/82*		at Louisville	L 60-70	15-5	Freedom Hall; Louisville, KY
02/10/82		at Connecticut	W 93-82 ^{OT}	16-5 (6-3)	Hartford Civic Center; Hartford, CT
02/13/82		Villanova	L 68-73	16-6 (6-4)	Alumni Hall; Queens, NY
02/15/82		at Providence	W 77-76 ^{2OT}	17-6 (7-4)	Providence Civic Center; Providence, RI
02/20/82		Boston College	L 81-90	17-7 (7-5)	Alumni Hall; Queens, NY
02/24/82		Seton Hall	W 82-65	18-7 (8-5)	Alumni Hall; Queens, NY
02/27/82		at Syracuse	W 80-76	19-7 (9-5)	Carrier Dome; Syracuse, NY
Big East tournament
03/04/82	(3)	vs. (6) Connecticut; Big East tournament quarterfinal	W 54-52	20-7	Madison Square Garden; New York, NY
03/05/82	(3)	vs. (2) No. 8 Georgetown; Big East tournament semifinal	L 42-57	20-8	Madison Square Garden; New York, NY
NCAA tournament
03/12/82*	(5 E)	vs. (12 E) Penn; First Round	W 66-56	21-8	Nassau Coliseum; Uniondale, NY
03/14/82*	(5 E)	vs. (4 E) No. 13 Alabama; Second Round	L 68-69	21-9	Nassau Coliseum; Uniondale, NY
*Non-conference game. ^{#}Rankings from AP Poll. (#) Tournament seedings in parentheses.
