= 1981–82 Syracuse Orangemen basketball team =

American college basketball season

1981–82 Syracuse Orangemen basketball

National Invitation Tournament, Second round
- Conference: Big East Conference
- Record: 16–13 (7–7 Big East)
- Head coach: Jim Boeheim (6th season)
- Assistant coach: Bernie Fine (6th season)
- Home arena: Carrier Dome

1981–82 Big East men's basketball standings
	Conf.				Overall
Team	W		L	PCT	W		L	PCT
Villanova	11	–	3	.786	24	–	8	.750
No. 6 Georgetown†	10	–	4	.714	30	–	7	.811
St. John's	9	–	5	.643	21	–	9	.700
Boston College	8	–	6	.571	22	–	10	.688
Syracuse	7	–	7	.500	16	–	13	.552
Connecticut	7	–	7	.500	17	–	11	.607
Providence	2	–	12	.143	10	–	17	.370
Seton Hall	2	–	12	.143	11	–	16	.407
† 1982 Big East tournament winner As of March 29, 1982; Rankings from AP Poll

The 1981–82 Syracuse Orangemen basketball team represented Syracuse University during the 1981–82 NCAA men's basketball season. They finished with an overall record of 16–13 (7–7 Big East). Syracuse were invited to the 1982 National Invitation Tournament. They won their first round match up vs Saint Peter's but lost to Bradley 95–81.

== Roster ==
- G Tony Bruin
- F/C Andre Hawkins
- F Sean Kerins
- F Chris Lewis
- F Ron Payton
- G Calvin Perry
- F Leo Rautins
- F Erich Santifer
- G Sonny Spera
- C. Timberlake
- F Gene Waldron
- Greg Watson
- F/C Peter Wynne
