= 1981–82 Boston College Eagles men's basketball team =

American college basketball season

1981–82 Boston College Eagles men's basketball

NCAA Men's Division I Tournament, Elite Eight
- Conference: Big East Conference
- Record: 22–10 (8–6 Big East)
- Head coach: Tom Davis (5th season)
- Home arena: Roberts Center

1981–82 Big East men's basketball standings
	Conf.				Overall
Team	W		L	PCT	W		L	PCT
Villanova	11	–	3	.786	24	–	8	.750
No. 6 Georgetown†	10	–	4	.714	30	–	7	.811
St. John's	9	–	5	.643	21	–	9	.700
Boston College	8	–	6	.571	22	–	10	.688
Syracuse	7	–	7	.500	16	–	13	.552
Connecticut	7	–	7	.500	17	–	11	.607
Providence	2	–	12	.143	10	–	17	.370
Seton Hall	2	–	12	.143	11	–	16	.407
† 1982 Big East tournament winner As of March 29, 1982; Rankings from AP Poll

The 1981–82 Boston College Eagles men's basketball team represented Boston College as members of the Big East Conference during the 1981–82 NCAA Division I men's basketball season.

== Roster ==
1981–82 Boston College Eagles men's basketball team
Players
Coaches

Pos.	#	Name	Height	Weight	Year	Hometown
G	23	Michael Adams	5 ft 10 in (1.78 m)	—	Fr	Hartford, CT
PF	42	Jay Murphy	6 ft 9 in (2.06 m)	210 lb (95 kg)	So	Meriden, CT
C		Ron Crevier	7 ft 0 in (2.13 m)	230 lb (104 kg)	Jr	Montreal, Quebec
G	54	John Bagley	6 ft 0 in (1.83 m)	—	Jr	Bridgeport, CT
PF	55	John Garris	6 ft 8 in (2.03 m)	200 lb (91 kg)	Jr	Bridgeport, CT

Head coach

- Tom Davis

Assistant coach(es)

- Kevin Mackey

Legend

- (C) Team captain
- (S) Suspended
- (I) Ineligible
- (W) Walk-on
- Injured
- Current redshirt

Roster
Last update: 2018-Mar-17

== Schedule and results ==
Date time, TV	Rank^{#}	Opponent^{#}	Result	Record	Site (attendance) city, state
Regular season
Nov 29, 1981*		Bentley	W 86–58	1–0	Roberts Center; Chestnut Hill, MA
Dec 2, 1981*		Stonehill	W 83–67	2–0	Roberts Center; Chestnut Hill, MA
Dec 4, 1981		vs. Villanova	L 75–97	2–1 (0–1)	
Dec 9, 1981*		Brown	W 84–69	3–1	Roberts Center; Chestnut Hill, MA
Dec 12, 1981*		at New Hampshire	W 82–50	4–1	
Dec 19, 1981*		at Fairfield	W 79–73 ^{2OT}	5–1	
Dec 29, 1981*		vs. Virginia Tech; Gator Bowl Tournament	L 70–75	5–2	
Dec 30, 1981*		vs. Texas Tech; Gator Bowl Tournament	L 78–84	5–3	
Jan 6, 1982		at Villanova	L 53–54	5–4 (0–2)	Villanova Field House; Villanova, PA
Jan 10, 1982		at No. 13 Georgetown	L 51–67	5–5 (0–3)	Capital Centre (9,365); Landover, MD
Jan 13, 1982		at Connecticut	L 58–59 ^{OT}	5–6 (0–4)	New Haven Coliseum; New Haven, CT
Jan 16, 1982		Providence	W 62–59	6–6 (1–4)	Roberts Center; Chestnut Hill, MA
Jan 18, 1982		Seton Hall	W 82–71	7–6 (2–4)	Roberts Center; Chestnut Hill, MA
Jan 23, 1982		at Syracuse	W 80–62	8–6 (3–4)	Carrier Dome; Syracuse, NY
Jan 26, 1982*		at Rhode Island	W 46–44	9–6	
Jan 28, 1982*		Northeastern	W 87–77	10–6	Roberts Center; Chestnut Hill, MA
Jan 30, 1982*		Merrimack	W 95–59	11–6	Roberts Center; Chestnut Hill, MA
Feb 3, 1982		St. John's	L 70–71	11–7 (3–5)	Roberts Center; Chestnut Hill, MA
Feb 6, 1982		Connecticut	L 59–67	11–8 (3–6)	Roberts Center; Chestnut Hill, MA
Feb 10, 1982		at Providence	W 78–71	12–8 (4–6)	Providence Civic Center; Providence, RI
Feb 13, 1982*		Holy Cross	W 102–81	13–8	Roberts Center; Chestnut Hill, MA
Feb 17, 1982		No. 13 Georgetown	W 80–71	14–8 (5–6)	Roberts Center (4,400); Chestnut Hill, MA
Feb 20, 1982		at St. John's	W 90–81	15–8 (6–6)	Alumni Hall; Queens, NY
Feb 22, 1982		Syracuse	W 88–77	16–8 (7–6)	Roberts Center; Chestnut Hill, MA
Feb 24, 1982*		St. Anselm	W 101–45	17–8	Roberts Center; Chestnut Hill, MA
Feb 27, 1982*		at Seton Hall	W 92–74	18–8 (8–6)	Brendan Byrne Arena; East Rutherford, NJ
Big East Tournament
Mar 5, 1982*		vs. Syracuse	W 94–92	19–8	Hartford Civic Center; Hartford, CT
Mar 6, 1982*		vs. Villanova; Semifinals	L 71–74	19–9	Hartford Civic Center; Hartford, CT
NCAA Tournament
Mar 12, 1982*	(8 MW)	vs. (9 MW) San Francisco; First round	W 70–66	20–9	Reunion Arena; Dallas, TX
Mar 14, 1982*	(8 MW)	vs. (1 MW) No. 2 DePaul; Second Round	W 82–75	21–9	Reunion Arena (12,719); Dallas, TX
Mar 19, 1982*	(8 MW)	vs. (5 MW) Kansas State; Midwest Regional semifinal – Sweet Sixteen	W 69–65	22–9	Checkerdome; St. Louis, MO
Mar 21, 1982*	(8 MW)	vs. (6 MW) Houston; Midwest Regional final – Elite Eight	L 92–99	22–10	Checkerdome; St. Louis, MO
*Non-conference game. ^{#}Rankings from AP Poll. (#) Tournament seedings in parentheses.
