= 1982 National Invitation Tournament =

Annual NCAA college basketball competition

- Season: 1981–82
- Teams: 32
- Finals site: Madison Square Garden, New York City
- Champions: Bradley Braves (4th title)
- Runner-up: Purdue Boilermakers (3rd title game)
- Semifinalists: Georgia Bulldogs (1st semifinal); Oklahoma Sooners (1st semifinal)
- Winning coach: Dick Versace (1st title)
- MVP: J. J. Anderson (Bradley)

The 1982 National Invitation Tournament was the 1982 edition of the annual NCAA college basketball competition.

== Selected teams ==
Below is a list of the 32 teams selected for the tournament.

Team	Conference	Overall record	Appearance	Last bid
American	East Coast	21–8	3rd	1981
Bradley	Missouri Valley	21–10	14th	1968
BYU	WAC	17–12	5th	1966
Clemson	ACC	14–13	4th	1981
Connecticut	Big East	17–10	6th	1981
Dayton	Independent	19–8	16th	1981
Fordham	MAAC	18–10	10th	1981
Georgia	SEC	18–11	2nd	1981
Illinois	Big Ten	17–10	2nd	1980
Iona	MAAC	24–8	1st	Never
Lamar	Southland	22–6	1st	Never
Long Island	ECAC Metro	20–9	9th	1968
LSU	SEC	14–13	2nd	1970
Maryland	ACC	15–12	3rd	1979
Murray State	OVC	20–7	2nd	1980
Oklahoma	Big Eight	19–10	3rd	1971
Ole Miss	SEC	17–11	2nd	1980
Oral Roberts	Midwestern City	18–11	5th	1977
Purdue	Big Ten	14–13	5th	1981
Richmond	ECAC South	18–10	1st	Never
Rutgers	Eastern 8	19–9	7th	1978
Saint Peter's	MAAC	20–8	9th	1980
San Diego State	WAC	20–8	1st	Never
Syracuse	Big East	15–12	8th	1981
Temple	East Coast	19–7	11th	1981
Texas A&M	Southwest	18–10	2nd	1979
Tulane	Metro	17–8	1st	Never
UC Irvine	PCAA	22–6	1st	Never
UNLV	Independent	19–9	2nd	1980
Virginia Tech	Metro	18–10	4th	1977
Washington	Pac-10	18–9	2nd	1980
Western Kentucky	OVC	19–9	10th	1965

== Bracket ==
Below are the four first round brackets, along with the four-team championship bracket.

First Round
Oklahoma	81
Oral Roberts	73
UC Irvine	70
San Diego State	69
Illinois	126
Long Island	78
Dayton	76
Connecticut	75

Second Round
Oklahoma	80
UC Irvine	77
Illinois	58
Dayton	61

Quarterfinals
Oklahoma	91
Dayton	82

First Round
Syracuse	84
Saint Peter's	75
Bradley	76
American	65
UNLV	87
Murray State	61
Tulane	83
LSU	72

Second Round
Syracuse	81
Bradley	95
UNLV	51
Tulane	56

Quarterfinals
Bradley	77
Tulane	61

First Round
Georgia	73
Temple	60
Maryland	60
Richmond	50
Ole Miss	53
Clemson	49
Virginia Tech	69
Fordham	58

Second Round
Georgia	83
Maryland	69
Ole Miss	59
Virginia Tech	61

Quarterfinals
Georgia	90
Virginia Tech	73

First Round
Purdue	72
Western Kentucky	65
Rutgers	55
Iona	51
Washington	66
BYU	63
Texas A&M	60
Lamar	58

Second Round
Purdue	98
Rutgers	65
Washington	65
Texas A&M	69

Quarterfinals
Purdue	86
Texas A&M	69

=== Semifinals & finals ===
Semifinals
Oklahoma	68
Bradley	84
Georgia	60
Purdue	61

Finals
Bradley	67
Purdue	58

== See also ==
- 1982 National Women's Invitational Tournament
- 1982 NCAA Division I men's basketball tournament
- 1982 NCAA Division II men's basketball tournament
- 1982 NCAA Division III men's basketball tournament
- 1982 NCAA Division I women's basketball tournament
- 1982 NCAA Division II women's basketball tournament
- 1982 NCAA Division III women's basketball tournament
- 1982 NAIA men's basketball tournament
- 1982 NAIA women's basketball tournament
