= 1981–82 Connecticut Huskies men's basketball team =

American college basketball season

1981–82 Connecticut Huskies men's basketball

NIT, First Round
- Conference: Big East Conference
- Record: 17–11 (7–7 Big East)
- Head coach: Dom Perno (5th season)
- Assistant coaches: Greg Ashford; Jim O’Brien; Bill Stuart
- Home arena: Hugh S. Greer Field House; New Haven Coliseum; Hartford Civic Center

1981–82 Big East men's basketball standings
| | Conf. | | | | Overall |
| Team | W | | L | PCT | W | | L | PCT |
|---|---|---|---|---|---|---|---|---|
| Villanova | 11 | – | 3 | .786 | 24 | – | 8 | .750 |
| No. 6 Georgetown† | 10 | – | 4 | .714 | 30 | – | 7 | .811 |
| St. John's | 9 | – | 5 | .643 | 21 | – | 9 | .700 |
| Boston College | 8 | – | 6 | .571 | 22 | – | 10 | .688 |
| Syracuse | 7 | – | 7 | .500 | 16 | – | 13 | .552 |
| Connecticut | 7 | – | 7 | .500 | 17 | – | 11 | .607 |
| Providence | 2 | – | 12 | .143 | 10 | – | 17 | .370 |
| Seton Hall | 2 | – | 12 | .143 | 11 | – | 16 | .407 |
† 1982 Big East tournament winner As of March 29, 1982; Rankings from AP Poll

The 1981–82 Connecticut Huskies men's basketball team represented the University of Connecticut in the 1981–82 collegiate men's basketball season. The Huskies completed the season with a 17–11 overall record. The Huskies were members of the Big East Conference where they finished with a 7–7 record. They made it to the first round of the 1982 National Invitation Tournament. The Huskies played their home games at Hugh S. Greer Field House in Storrs, Connecticut, the New Haven Coliseum in New Haven, Connecticut, and the Hartford Civic Center in Hartford, Connecticut and were led by fifth-year head coach Dom Perno.

== Schedule ==
| Date time, TV | Rank^{#} | Opponent^{#} | Result | Record | Site (attendance) city, state |
Regular Season
| 11/28/1981* | | at Maine | W 68–53 | 1–0 | Memorial Gymnasium; Orono, ME |
| 12/2/1981* | | New Hampshire | W 87–68 | 2–0 | Hugh S. Greer Field House; Storrs, CT |
| 12/5/1981* | | Boston University | W 73–54 | 3–0 | Hugh S. Greer Field House; Storrs, CT |
| 12/8/1981* | | at Fairfield | W 75–71 | 4–0 | Alumni Hall; Fairfield, CT |
| 12/11/1981* | | at Oral Roberts; Oil Capital Classic | L 67–69 | 4–1 | Mabee Center; Tulsa, OK |
| 12/12/1981* | | vs. TCU; Oil Capital Classic | W 69–67 ^{OT} | 5–1 | Mabee Center; Tulsa, OK |
| 12/22/1981* | | at Massachusetts | W 66–55 | 6–1 | Curry Hicks Cage; Amherst, MA |
| 12/29/1981* | | St. Bonaventure; Connecticut Mutual Classic | W 91–73 | 7–1 | Hartford Civic Center; Hartford, CT |
| 12/30/1981* | | South Florida; Connecticut Mutual Classic | W 57–50 | 8–1 | Hartford Civic Center; Hartford, CT |
| 1/6/1982 | | at Syracuse; Rivalry | L 69–72 | 8–2 (0–1) | Carrier Dome; Syracuse, NY |
| 1/9/1982 | | Seton Hall | W 76–66 | 9–2 (1–1) | Hugh S. Greer Field House; Storrs, CT |
| 1/13/1982 | | Boston College | W 59–58 ^{OT} | 10–2 (2–1) | New Haven Coliseum; New Haven, CT |
| 1/16/1982 | | at St. John's | L 71–77 | 10–3 (2–2) | Carnesecca Arena; New York, NY |
| 1/20/1982 | | at Georgetown; Rivalry | W 63–52 | 11–3 (3–2) | McDonough Gymnasium; Washington, D.C. |
| 1/23/1982 | | Villanova | W 53–51 | 12–3 (4–2) | Hartford Civic Center; Hartford, CT |
| 1/26/1982* | | Yale | W 63–57 | 13–3 | Hugh S. Greer Field House; Storrs, CT |
| 1/28/1982* | | Manhattan | W 72–57 | 14–3 | Hugh S. Greer Field House; Storrs, CT |
| 1/30/1982* | | at Holy Cross | L 69–76 | 14–4 | Hart Center; Worcester, MA |
| 2/1/1982 | | at Providence | W 47–45 ^{OT} | 15–4 (5–2) | Providence Civic Center; Providence, RI |
| 2/6/1982 | | at Boston College | W 67–59 | 16–4 (6–2) | Roberts Center; Boston, MA |
| 2/10/1982 | | St. John's | L 82–93 ^{OT} | 16–5 (6–3) | Hartford Civic Center; Hartford, CT |
| 2/13/1982 | | Syracuse; Rivalry | L 71–78 | 16–6 (6–4) | Hartford Civic Center; Hartford, CT |
| 2/16/1982 | | at Seton Hall | L 59–61 | 16–7 (6–5) | Walsh Gymnasium; South Orange, NJ |
| 2/20/1982 | | Providence | W 90–61 | 17–7 (7–5) | New Haven Coliseum; New Haven, CT |
| 2/24/1982 | | at Villanova | L 63–67 ^{OT} | 17–8 (7–6) | Jake Nevin Field House; Villanova, PA |
| 2/27/1982 | | Georgetown; Rivalry | L 42–60 | 17–9 (7–7) | Hartford Civic Center; Hartford, CT |
Big East tournament
| 3/4/1982 | | St. John's; Quarterfinals | L 52–54 | 17–10 | Hartford Civic Center; Hartford, CT |
NIT
| 3/10/1982* | | at Dayton; First Round | L 75–76 ^{OT} | 17–11 | UD Arena; Dayton, OH |
*Non-conference game. ^{#}Rankings from AP Poll. (#) Tournament seedings in parentheses. All times are in Eastern Time.

Schedule Source:
