= 1981–82 Georgetown Hoyas men's basketball team =

American college basketball season

1981–82 Georgetown Hoyas men's basketball

Rochester Classic Champions NCAA tournament, runner-up Big East tournament champions

National Championship Game, L 62-63 vs. North Carolina
- Conference: Big East Conference

Ranking
- Coaches: No. 7
- AP: No. 6
- Record: 30–7 (10–4 Big East)
- Head coach: John Thompson (10th season)
- Assistant coaches: Bill Stein (10th season); Norman Washington (2nd season); Eddie Meyers (1st season)
- Captains: Eric "Sleepy" Floyd; Eric Smith; Ed Spriggs
- Home arena: Capital Centre

1981–82 Big East men's basketball standings
	Conf.				Overall
Team	W		L	PCT	W		L	PCT
Villanova	11	–	3	.786	24	–	8	.750
No. 6 Georgetown†	10	–	4	.714	30	–	7	.811
St. John's	9	–	5	.643	21	–	9	.700
Boston College	8	–	6	.571	22	–	10	.688
Syracuse	7	–	7	.500	16	–	13	.552
Connecticut	7	–	7	.500	17	–	11	.607
Providence	2	–	12	.143	10	–	17	.370
Seton Hall	2	–	12	.143	11	–	16	.407
† 1982 Big East tournament winner As of March 29, 1982; Rankings from AP Poll

The 1981–82 Georgetown Hoyas men's basketball team represented Georgetown University in the 1981–82 NCAA Division I college basketball season. Led by tenth-year head coach John Thompson, it was the first season in which they played their home games at the Capital Centre in suburban Landover, Maryland, except for five games at McDonough Gymnasium on campus in Washington, D.C.

They were members of the Big East Conference and finished the season with a record of 30–7 overall, 10–4 in Big East play. They won the Big East tournament championship, and in the 48 team NCAA tournament they advanced to the national championship game, but lost to North Carolina.

== Season recap ==
This season saw the arrival of freshman Patrick Ewing as Georgetown's center. Rumors arose even before his arrival that he lacked the academic ability to perform at Georgetown and some sportswriters opined that Georgetown was compromising its academic standards in order to recruit a star player like Ewing. John Thompson and other school officials dismissed the rumors and criticism, and Thompson went to great lengths to shield Ewing from the media. Ewing would go on to earn his degree from Georgetown on time in May 1985.

Georgetown's move from on-campus McDonough Gymnasium to the Capital Centre for its home games had been prompted by a surge in fan interest in the team as its prominence grew, especially after Ewing's arrival sparked great excitement; average attendance at Georgetown games was twice that of the previous season. The Hoyas started the season 11–2 against non-conference opponents, with senior guard and team co-captain Eric "Sleepy" Floyd getting off to an uncharacteristically slow start but then returning to his role as the team's leading scorer, with a combined 41 points in games against American and George Washington, 27 against Nevada-Las Vegas, and 14 of Georgetown's 38 points in a pre-shot-clock-era slow-down game against Columbia.

Ewing did not start Georgetown's first game of the season, but he did start the second one and every game after that for the rest of his collegiate career. His talent became apparent immediately to observers following the team closely, but the national media knew him only as one of the year's promising young centers. His breakout game came on January 6, 1982, when he played in New York City for the first time. Madison Square Garden hosted its first major college basketball doubleheader since the mid-1960s that day, with No. 9 Wichita State facing Iona in the first game followed by No. 13 Georgetown taking on No. 20 St. John's in the Hoyas' Big East opener. Many expected St. John's to win, but Ewing put in a dominating performance and during the first half Georgetown jumped out to a 41–9 lead. The Hoyas led by 24 points at the half and won 72–42, stunning St. John's fans and ending the media's comparisons of Ewing to any other center in the country. Floyd, meanwhile, led the team in scoring, as he would in nine of the first 11 Big East games of the season and in 11 Big East games overall during the year.

On February 20, 1982, No. 13 Georgetown hosted No. 4 Missouri, led by center Steve Stipanovich, in a nationally televised game held at McDonough Gymnasium – the last major men's basketball game scheduled there – because of a scheduling conflict at the Capital Centre. The announced crowd of 4,620 was a record for McDonough, and observers believed the crowd actually exceeded 5,000. Floyd scored 16 points and the issue was never really in doubt, with Georgetown upsetting the Tigers 63–51. The enduring image of the game, shown three times to the television audience on instant replay, was a play in which Ewing attempted to take an alley-oop pass in for a dunk; he missed the dunk, but slammed the ball onto the rim so hard that it flew 20 to 30 feet (6 to 9 meters) into the air, drawing a huge crowd reaction and prompting television commentators to express admiration for his power and potential.

Senior center Ed Spriggs started the first game of the year but did not start again, instead coming off the bench to relieve Ewing, especially during the middle of games when Ewing had to come out of play with foul trouble. Spriggs' greatest success came in mid-season with a 14-point, seven-rebound effort against Syracuse.

Sophomore Fred Brown started all 37 games and played point guard all season. He shot 50% from the field, had 131 assists, and set a single-season school record with 80 steals. Senior guard-forward Eric Smith shot 47.9% from the field, averaging 9.5 points per game, and had 75 steals and 116 assists. Early in the year, he scored 17 points against Villanova, and he had 11 points in the Missouri game.

Senior forward Mike Hancock started all 37 games. Although overshadowed by Ewing by the end of the season, he shot 47% from the field and had a career-high 20 points, along with seven rebounds, against Boston College. Freshman forward Bill Martin spent most of the season as a reserve behind Hancock, but he did score 21 points early in the season against Saint Leo. Sophomore guard Gene Smith had proven himself to be a top defensive asset for the Hoyas the previous season, but he was injured during most of this year. He scored a season-high 10 points against Syracuse, but otherwise scored only 19 points in the other 20 games in which he played.

Sleepy Floyd scored 29 points – his season high – against Villanova and 20 and 27 points in two games against Syracuse, and the Hoyas finished second in the Big East regular season behind Villanova. During the 1982 Big East men's basketball tournament, Floyd averaged 16.3 points per game, and Georgetown defeated Villanova in the final for the second Big East tournament championship in Georgetown men's basketball history. Eric Smith, who had only four points in the semifinal against St. John's, helped lead Georgetown to victory in the Villanova game with 14 points.

The Hoyas received a No. 1 seed and first-round bye in the West Region of the 1982 NCAA Division I men's basketball tournament, the fourth of 14 consecutive Georgetown NCAA tournament appearances. Against Wyoming in the second round, Eric Smith scored 13 points and held Wyoming's Bill Garnett to just five as Georgetown won 51–43. Meeting No. 4 Oregon State in the West Region final, Georgetown shot 29-for-39 (74.4%) from the field – a school record and the third-best ever in an NCAA Tournament game – and Floyd scored 22 points on the way to a 69–45 win that put Georgetown in the Final Four for only the second time in its history and the first time since 1943. In a defensive struggle in the national semifinals against Louisville, Georgetown sophomore guard Fred Brown played one of the best games of his career, Floyd continued his hot scoring, and Eric Smith scored 14 points to give the Hoyas a 50–46 win and their second appearance in the NCAA final and first since 1943.

The Hoyas played North Carolina in the final before 61,612 fans, the largest paid basketball crowd in NCAA history. Between the two teams, ten future professionals, among them five future National Basketball Association (NBA) All-Stars, played in a tight game in which neither team ever led by more than six points. Eric Smith scored 14 points and had five assists. Floyd ran his combined point total in the Louisville and North Carolina games to 31, making him the top scorer across both games, while Ewing went 10-for-15 from the field, scored 23 points, had 11 rebounds and three steals, and blocked two shots. With 18 seconds left in the game, North Carolina freshman Michael Jordan scored on an 18-foot (5.5-meter) shot to give the Tar Heels a one-point lead. As Georgetown set its offense for a final shot with seconds left, Brown mistook North Carolina forward James Worthy for Eric Smith and passed the ball to Worthy; as Worthy dribbled down the court, Eric Smith had to foul him to stop the clock with two seconds left. At the free-throw line, Worthy missed the first shot of a one-and-one; Georgetown got the rebound and passed it to Floyd, who made the last shot of his collegiate career, a desperate heave from halfcourt with one second left that fell several feet short. North Carolina took the national championship 63–62, and Georgetown's season ended with cameras capturing John Thompson on the sidelines consoling a devastated Fred Brown with a hug while the Tar Heels celebrated.

Floyd was among five seniors on the team to graduate in 1982, having been the Hoyas' top scorer in all four of his seasons with the team; he remains the top-scoring player in Georgetown history. Drafted in the first round in 1982 by the New Jersey Nets, he had a very successful NBA career, playing for the Nets, Golden State Warriors, and Houston Rockets before retiring in 1995.

The 1981–82 Hoyas were ranked No. 6 in the season's final Associated Press Poll and No. 7 in the final Coaches' Poll.

== Roster ==
Freshman center Patrick Ewing returned to Georgetown as head coach from 2017 to 2023.

#	Name	Height	Weight (lbs.)	Position	Class	Hometown	Previous Team(s)
10	Kurt Kaull	6'3"	N/A	G	Jr.	Wheaton, Illinois, United States	Wheaton Warrenville South HS
11	Anthony Jones	6'6"	N/A	F	Fr.	Washington, D.C., United States	Dunbar HS
12	Elvado Smith	6'2"	N/A	G	Fr.	Harwood, Maryland, United States	South River HS
20	Fred Brown	6'5"	190	G	So.	Bronx, New York, United States	Adlai E. Stevenson HS
21	Eric "Sleepy" Floyd	6'3"	170	G	Sr.	Gastonia, North Carolina, United States	Hunter Huss HS
22	Gene Smith	6'2"	170	G	So.	Washington, D.C., United States	McKinley Technology HS
24	Bill Martin	6'7"	215	F	Fr.	Washington, D.C., United States	McKinley Technology HS
30	Ron Blaylock	6'3"	N/A	G	Sr.	Winston-Salem, North Carolina, United States	East Forsyth HS
32	Eric Smith	6'5"	185	F	Sr.	Potomac, Maryland, United States	Winston Churchill HS
33	Patrick Ewing	7'0"	240	C	Fr.	Cambridge, Massachusetts, United States	Cambridge Rindge and Latin School
34	Jim Corcoran	6'0"	N/A	G	Sr.	Potomac, Maryland, United States	Georgetown Preparatory School
40	Mike Hancock	6'7"	180	F	Sr.	Washington, D.C., United States	Roosevelt Senior HS
42	David Blue	6'7"	N/A	F	Jr.	Frederick, Maryland, United States	Prospect Hall HS
50	Ed Spriggs	6'9"	240	C/F	Sr.	North Brentwood, Maryland, United States	Northwestern HS

== Team players drafted into the NBA ==
Round	Pick	Player	NBA club
1	13	Eric "Sleepy" Floyd	New Jersey Nets

== Rankings ==
Ranking movement Legend: ██ Improvement in ranking. ██ Decrease in ranking. ██ Not ranked the previous week. RV=Others receiving votes.
Poll	Pre	Wk 1	Wk 2	Wk 3	Wk 4	Wk 5	Wk 6	Wk 7	Wk 8	Wk 9	Wk 10	Wk 11	Wk 12	Wk 13	Wk 14	Final
AP	5	20	20	19	17	17	13	8	13			20	13	12	8	6
Coaches	5	–		17	13	15	9	7	11		20	17	12	11	8	7

== Schedule and results ==
Date time, TV	Rank^{#}	Opponent^{#}	Result	Record	Site (attendance) city, state
Exhibition
Nov. 18, 1981*	No. 5	KK Cibona	W 78–64	—	McDonough Gymnasium (2,718); Washington, DC
Regular Season
Nov. 27, 1981*	No. 5	vs. Southwestern Louisiana; Great Alaska Shootout	L 61–70	0–1	Buckner Fieldhouse (3,600); Fort Richardson, AK
Nov. 28, 1981*	No. 5	at Alaska-Anchorage; Great Alaska Shootout	W 77–67	1–1	Buckner Fieldhouse (3,600); Fort Richardson, AK
Nov. 29, 1981*	No. 5	vs. Ohio State; Great Alaska Shootout	L 46–47	1–2	Buckner Fieldhouse (1,500); Fort Richardson, AK
Dec. 2, 1981*	No. 20	Morgan State	W 81–53	2–2	McDonough Gymnasium (3,802); Washington, D.C.
Dec. 5, 1981*	No. 20	San Diego State	W 71–53	3–2	Capital Centre (8,503); Landover, Maryland
Dec. 9, 1981*	No. 20	Saint Leo	W 83–37	4–2	McDonough Gymnasium (N/A); Washington, D.C.
Dec. 12, 1981*	No. 20	American	W 75–63	5–2	Capital Centre (8,494); Landover, Maryland
Dec. 16, 1981*	No. 19	George Washington	W 61–48	6–2	Capital Centre (8,695); Landover, Maryland
Dec. 19, 1981*	No. 19	Nevada-Las Vegas	W 76–52	7–2	Capital Centre (N/A); Landover, Maryland
Dec. 22, 1981*	No. 17	Western Kentucky	W 64–45	8–2	Capital Centre (8,802); Landover, Maryland
Dec. 29, 1981*	No. 17	vs. Columbia; Rochester Classic	W 38–26	9–2	Rochester Community War Memorial (4,606); Rochester, New York
Dec. 30, 1981*	No. 17	vs. Niagara; Rochester Classic	W 77–49	10–2	Rochester Community War Memorial (6,294); Rochester, New York
Jan. 2, 1982*	No. 17	Robert Morris	W 75–58	11–2	Capital Centre (7,155); Landover, Maryland
Jan. 6, 1982	No. 13	at No. 20 St. John's	W 72–42	12–2 (1–0)	Madison Square Garden (19,951); New York City
Jan. 10, 1982	No. 13	Boston College	W 67–51	13–2 (2–0)	Capital Centre (9,365); Landover, Maryland
Jan. 13, 1982	No. 8	at Seton Hall	W 62–60	14–2 (3–0)	Walsh Gymnasium (2,902); South Orange, New Jersey
Jan. 17, 1982	No. 8	at Syracuse; Rivalry	L 70–75	14–3 (3–1)	Carrier Dome (N/A); Syracuse, New York
Jan. 20, 1982	No. 13	Connecticut; Rivalry	L 52–63	14–4 (3–2)	McDonough Gymnasium (4,520); Washington, D.C.
Jan. 23, 1982	No. 13	at Providence	L 49–50	14–5 (3–3)	Providence Civic Center (7,953); Providence, Rhode Island
Jan 25, 1982	No. 13	No. 20 Villanova	W 72–56	15–5 (4–3)	Capital Centre (11,553); Landover, Maryland
Jan. 31, 1982		St. John's	W 63–46	16–5 (5–3)	Capital Centre (12,934); Landover, Maryland
Feb. 3, 1982		at Villanova	W 83–72	17–5 (6–3)	Palestra (9,208); Philadelphia, Pennsylvania
Feb. 6, 1982		Seton Hall	W 113–73	18–5 (7–3)	Capital Centre (11,850); Landover, Maryland
Feb. 8, 1982		Syracuse; Rivalry	W 96–79	19–5 (8–3)	Capital Centre (N/A); Landover, Maryland
Feb. 13, 1982*	No. 20	Southern	W 84–48	20–5	McDonough Gymnasium (4,513); Washington, D.C.
Feb. 17, 1982	No. 13	at Boston College	L 71–80	20–6 (8–4)	Roberts Center (4,400); Chestnut Hill, Massachusetts
Feb. 20, 1982*; NBC	No. 13	No. 4 Missouri	W 63–51	21–6	McDonough Gymnasium (4,620); Washington, D.C.
Feb. 24, 1982	No. 12	Providence	W 60–42	22–6 (9–4)	Capital Centre (12,812); Landover, Maryland
Feb. 27, 1982	No. 12	at Connecticut; Rivalry	W 60–42	23–6 (10–4)	Hartford Civic Center (15,425); Hartford, Connecticut
Big East tournament
Mar. 4, 1982	(2) No. 8	vs. (7) Providence; Quarterfinal	W 62–48	24–6	Hartford Civic Center (14,944); Hartford, Connecticut
Mar. 5, 1982	(2) No. 8	vs. (3) St. John's; Semifinal	W 57–42	25–6	Hartford Civic Center (15,136); Hartford, Connecticut
Mar. 6, 1982	(2) No. 8	vs. (1) Villanova; Final	W 72–54	26–6	Hartford Civic Center (14,044); Hartford, Connecticut
NCAA Tournament
Mar. 13, 1982; 6:24 pm	(1 W) No. 6	vs. (8 W) Wyoming; West Region Second Round	W 51–43	27–6	Assembly Center (9,546); Logan, Utah
Mar. 18, 1982; 11:40 pm, CBS	(1 W) No. 6	vs. (4 W) No. 11 Fresno State; West Region Semifinal – Sweet Sixteen	W 58–40	28–6	Marriott Center (15,237); Provo, Utah
Mar. 20, 1982; 2:55 pm, CBS	(1 W) No. 6	vs. (2 W) No. 4 Oregon State; West Region Final – Elite Eight	W 69–45	29–6	Marriott Center (14,986); Provo, Utah
Mar. 27, 1982; 6:00 pm, CBS	(1 W) No. 6	vs. (3 ME) No. 20 Louisville; National Semifinal	W 50–46	30–6	Louisiana Superdome (61,612); New Orleans, Louisiana
March 29, 1982; 8:00 pm, CBS	(1 W) No. 6	vs. (1 E) No. 1 North Carolina; National Final	L 62–63	30–7	Louisiana Superdome (61,612); New Orleans, Louisiana
*Non-conference game. ^{#}Rankings from AP poll. (#) Tournament seedings in parentheses. All times are in Eastern time.
