= 1981–82 Villanova Wildcats men's basketball team =

American college basketball season

1981–82 Villanova Wildcats men's basketball

Big East Regular season champions

NCAA Men's Division I Tournament, Elite Eight
- Conference: Big East Conference
- Record: 22–8 (11–3 Big East)
- Head coach: Rollie Massimino (9th season)
- Assistant coaches: Mitch Buonaguro (5th season); Marty Marbach (3rd season); Harry Booth
- Home arena: Villanova Field House

1981–82 Big East men's basketball standings
	Conf.				Overall
Team	W		L	PCT	W		L	PCT
Villanova	11	–	3	.786	24	–	8	.750
No. 6 Georgetown†	10	–	4	.714	30	–	7	.811
St. John's	9	–	5	.643	21	–	9	.700
Boston College	8	–	6	.571	22	–	10	.688
Syracuse	7	–	7	.500	16	–	13	.552
Connecticut	7	–	7	.500	17	–	11	.607
Providence	2	–	12	.143	10	–	17	.370
Seton Hall	2	–	12	.143	11	–	16	.407
† 1982 Big East tournament winner As of March 29, 1982; Rankings from AP Poll

The 1981–82 Villanova Wildcats men's basketball team represented Villanova University during the 1981–82 NCAA Division I men's basketball season. The head coach was Rollie Massimino. The team played its home games at Villanova Field House in Villanova, Pennsylvania, and was a member of the Big East Conference. The team won the regular season Big East title and reached the Elite Eight of the NCAA tournament before falling to eventual national champion North Carolina. Villanova finished with a 22–8 record (11–3 Big East).

== Roster ==
1981–82 Villanova Wildcats men's basketball team
Players
Coaches

Pos.	#	Name	Height	Weight	Year	Hometown
G	10	Stewart Granger	6 ft 3 in (1.91 m)	185 lb (84 kg)	Jr	Brooklyn, New York
G	20	Brian Harrington	6 ft 0 in (1.83 m)	165 lb (75 kg)	Fr	Pound Ridge, New York
G/F	33	Dwayne McClain	6 ft 6 in (1.98 m)	195 lb (88 kg)	Fr	Worcester, Massachusetts
G	22	Gary McLain	6 ft 0 in (1.83 m)	180 lb (82 kg)	Fr	Hempstead, New York
F/C	54	Ed Pinckney	6 ft 9 in (2.06 m)	205 lb (93 kg)	Fr	Bronx, New York
F	45	John Pinone	6 ft 8 in (2.03 m)	225 lb (102 kg)	Jr	Hartford, Connecticut
F	25	Steve Pinone	6 ft 4 in (1.93 m)	195 lb (88 kg)	Fr	Wethersfield, Connecticut
G	14	Jeff Sherry	6 ft 3 in (1.91 m)	190 lb (86 kg)	Sr	Macungie, Pennsylvania

Head coach

- Rollie Massimino (Vermont)

Assistant coach(es)

- Mitch Buonaguro (Boston College)
- Marty Marbach (Saint Francis (PA))
- Harry Booth (Saint Joseph's)

Legend

- (C) Team captain
- (S) Suspended
- (I) Ineligible
- (W) Walk-on
- Injured
- Current redshirt

== Schedule and results ==
Date time, TV	Rank^{#}	Opponent^{#}	Result	Record	Site city, state
Regular season
Dec 1, 1981*		at St. Francis (NY)	W 93–63	1–0	Generoso Pope Athletic Complex (2,000); Brooklyn, New York
Dec 4, 1981		vs. Boston College	W 97–75	2–0 (1–0)	
Dec 8, 1981		Providence	W 65–54	3–0 (2–0)	Villanova Field House; Villanova, Pennsylvania
Dec 12, 1981*		at Penn	W 75–61	4–0	The Palestra; Philadelphia, Pennsylvania
Dec 14, 1981*		at Towson State	W 85–55	5–0	Towson Center; Towson, Maryland
Dec 19, 1981*	No. 18	vs. Temple	L 48–52	5–1	
Dec 28, 1981*	No. 20	vs. No. 11 Indiana; ECAC Holiday Festival	W 63–59	6–1	Madison Square Garden; New York, New York
Dec 29, 1981*	No. 19	vs. St. John's; ECAC Holiday Festival	L 89–94	6–2	Madison Square Garden; New York, New York
Jan 6, 1982		Boston College	W 54–53	7–2 (3–0)	Villanova Field House; Villanova, Pennsylvania
Jan 9, 1982		Syracuse	W 84–83	8–2 (4–0)	Villanova Field House; Villanova, Pennsylvania
Jan 11, 1982		St. John's	W 64–62	9–2 (5–0)	Villanova Field House; Villanova, Pennsylvania
Jan 16, 1982		at Seton Hall	W 71–70	10–2 (6–0)	Brendan Byrne Arena; East Rutherford, New Jersey
Jan 19, 1982*		at Notre Dame	W 48–46	11–2	Joyce Center; Notre Dame, Indiana
Jan 23, 1982		at Connecticut	L 51–53	11–3 (6–1)	Hartford Civic Center; Hartford, Connecticut
Jan 25, 1982		at Georgetown	L 56–72	11–4 (6–2)	Capital Centre; Washington, D.C.
Jan 27, 1982*		vs. La Salle	W 117–82	12–4	
Jan 31, 1982*		vs. Saint Joseph's	L 64–84	12–5	
Feb 3, 1982		Georgetown	L 72–83	12–6 (6–3)	Villanova Field House; Villanova, Pennsylvania
Feb 6, 1982*		Maine	W 81–65	13–6	Villanova Field House; Villanova, Pennsylvania
Feb 10, 1982		Seton Hall	W 66–53	14–6 (7–3)	Villanova Field House; Villanova, Pennsylvania
Feb 13, 1982		at St. John's	W 73–68	15–6 (8–3)	Madison Square Garden; New York, New York
Feb 17, 1982		at Syracuse	W 81–69	16–6 (9–3)	Carrier Dome; Syracuse, New York
Feb 24, 1982		Connecticut	W 67–63	17–6 (10–3)	Villanova Field House; Villanova, Pennsylvania
Feb 27, 1982		at Providence	W 54–53	18–6 (11–3)	Providence Civic Center; Providence, Rhode Island
Big East tournament
Mar 5, 1982*		vs. Seton Hall; Quarterfinals	W 88–73	19–6	Hartford Civic Center; Hartford, Connecticut
Mar 6, 1982*		vs. Boston College; Semifinals	W 74–71	20–6	Hartford Civic Center; Hartford, Connecticut
Mar 7, 1982*		vs. No. 8 Georgetown; Championship Game	L 54–72	20–7	Hartford Civic Center; Hartford, Connecticut
NCAA tournament
Mar 14, 1982*	(3 E)	vs. (11 E) Northeastern	W 76–72 ^{3OT}	21–7	Nassau Coliseum
Mar 19, 1982*	(3 E)	vs. (2 E) No. 9 Memphis State; East Regional semifinal – Sweet Sixteen	W 70–66 ^{OT}	22–7	Reynolds Coliseum; Raleigh, North Carolina
Mar 21, 1982*	(3 E)	vs. (1 E) No. 1 North Carolina; East Regional final – Elite Eight	L 60–70	22–8	Reynolds Coliseum; Raleigh, North Carolina
*Non-conference game. ^{#}Rankings from AP poll. (#) Tournament seedings in parentheses. E=East. All times are in Eastern Time.

== Awards and honors ==
- John Pinone – Robert V. Geasey Trophy (2x)
