= 1981–82 San Francisco Dons men's basketball team =

American college basketball season

1981–82 San Francisco Dons men's basketball

NCAA Tournament, first round
- Conference: West Coast Athletic Conference
- Record: 25–6 (11–3 WCAC)
- Head coach: Peter Barry (2nd season)
- Home arena: War Memorial Gymnasium

1981–82 West Coast Athletic Conference men's basketball standings
	Conf.				Overall
Team	W		L	PCT	W		L	PCT
Pepperdine	14	–	0	1.000	22	–	7	.759
San Francisco	11	–	3	.786	26	–	5	.839
Portland	9	–	5	.643	17	–	10	.630
Santa Clara	7	–	7	.500	16	–	11	.593
Gonzaga	7	–	7	.500	15	–	12	.556
San Diego	4	–	10	.286	11	–	15	.423
Saint Mary's	3	–	11	.214	11	–	16	.407
Loyola Marymount	1	–	13	.071	3	–	24	.111
Rankings from AP Poll

The 1981–82 San Francisco Dons men's basketball team represented the University of San Francisco as a member of the West Coast Athletic Conference during the 1981–82 NCAA Division I men's basketball season. The Dons finished the season with a 25–6 record (11–3 WCAC) and received a bid to the NCAA Tournament as No. 9 seed in the Midwest region.

== Roster ==
1981–82 San Francisco Dons men's basketball team
Players
Coaches

Pos.	#	Name	Height	Weight	Year	Hometown
G		Quintin Dailey	6 ft 3 in (1.91 m)	175 lb (79 kg)	Jr	Baltimore, Maryland
		Ken McAlister	6 ft 5 in (1.96 m)	210 lb (95 kg)	Sr	Oakland, California
C	34	Wallace Bryant	7 ft 0 in (2.13 m)	230 lb (104 kg)	Sr	Gary, Indiana

Head coach

- Peter Barry (San Francisco)

Assistant coach(es)

Legend

- (C) Team captain
- (S) Suspended
- (I) Ineligible
- (W) Walk-on
- Injured
- Current redshirt

== Schedule and results ==
Date time, TV	Rank^{#}	Opponent^{#}	Result	Record	Site city, state
Non-conference regular season
Nov 28, 1981*		No. 16 Georgia	W 92–84	1–0	War Memorial Gymnasium; San Francisco, California
Dec 4, 1981*	No. 14	vs. California	W 72–64	2–0	
Dec, 1981*		San Francisco State	W 94–67	3–0	War Memorial Gymnasium; San Francisco, California
Dec, 1981*		Southern Utah State	W 78–66	4–0	War Memorial Gymnasium; San Francisco, California
Dec, 1981*		Chico State	W 105–69	5–0	War Memorial Gymnasium; San Francisco, California
Dec 18, 1981*		Rice	W 85–69	6–0	War Memorial Gymnasium; San Francisco, California
Dec 19, 1981*		Iona	W 88–81	7–0	War Memorial Gymnasium; San Francisco, California
Dec 22, 1981*		New Orleans	W 86–83	8–0	War Memorial Gymnasium; San Francisco, California
Dec 23, 1981*		Colgate	W 65–62	9–0	War Memorial Gymnasium; San Francisco, California
Dec 27, 1981*		vs. Bradley	W 87–82	10–0	
Dec 28, 1981*		vs. Rice	L 66–78	10–1	
Dec 29, 1981*	No. 6	vs. No. 2 Wichita State	W 84–74	11–1	
Jan 5, 1982*		San Jose State	W 78–66	12–1	War Memorial Gymnasium; San Francisco, California
Jan 9, 1982*		at South Carolina	W 72–71	13–1	
Jan 12, 1982*	No. 7	vs. Notre Dame	W 57–55	14–1	Oakland Coliseum; Oakland, California
WCAC Regular season
Jan 15, 1982		at Pepperdine	L 91–102	14–2 (0–1)	Firestone Fieldhouse; Malibu, California
Feb 2, 1982*	No. 7	at Notre Dame	L 66–75	19–3	Joyce Center; Notre Dame, Indiana
Feb 26, 1982	No. 16	Loyola Marymount	W 96–73	24–4 (10–2)	War Memorial Gymnasium; San Francisco, California
Feb 28, 1982	No. 16	Pepperdine	L 100–106	24–5 (10–3)	War Memorial Gymnasium; San Francisco, California
Mar 3, 1982		Santa Clara	W 91–83	25–5 (11–3)	War Memorial Gymnasium; San Francisco, California
NCAA tournament
Mar 12, 1982*	(9 MW)	vs. (8 MW) Boston College; First round	L 66–70	25–6	Reunion Arena; Dallas, Texas
*Non-conference game. ^{#}Rankings from AP Poll. (#) Tournament seedings in parentheses. MW=Midwest. All times are in Pacific Time.

== Awards and honors ==
- Quintin Dailey – WCAC Player of the Year (2x)
