= John Bagley (basketball) =

American basketball player (born 1960)

Personal information
- Born: April 23, 1960 (age 66) Bridgeport, Connecticut, U.S.
- Listed height: 6 ft 0 in (1.83 m)
- Listed weight: 185 lb (84 kg)

Career information
- High school: Warren Harding (Bridgeport, Connecticut)
- College: Boston College (1979–1982)
- NBA draft: 1982: 1st round, 12th overall pick
- Drafted by: Cleveland Cavaliers
- Playing career: 1982–1993
- Position: Point guard
- Number: 5

Career history
- 1982–1987: Cleveland Cavaliers
- 1987–1989: New Jersey Nets
- 1989–1993: Boston Celtics
- 1993: Atlanta Hawks

Career highlights
- Third-team All-American – NABC (1982); Big East Player of the Year (1981); 2× First-team All-Big East (1981, 1982)

Career NBA statistics
- Points: 5,802 (8.7 ppg)
- Rebounds: 1,729 (2.6 rpg)
- Assists: 3,980 (6.0 apg)
- Stats at NBA.com
- Stats at Basketball Reference

John Edward "Bags" Bagley (born April 23, 1960) is an American former basketball player in the National Basketball Association (NBA). He played college basketball for the Boston College Eagles.

== College career ==
Bagley played for Boston College for three seasons, where he averaged nearly 18 points a game and became the first Eagle to earn Big East Men's Basketball Player of the Year honors. He averaged 20.4 points per game during the 1980–81 season, his sophomore year, and led the Eagles to the regular-season championship and NCAA Tournament's Sweet 16. The following year, Bagley scored 21.1 points per game and led Boston College to the Elite Eight of the NCAA Tournament. Bagley also played in the Men's World University Games in 1981, and led the team with 14.8 points per game. He left Boston College after his junior year and entered the 1982 NBA draft. He was inducted into the Boston College Varsity Club Athletic Hall of Fame in 1995.

On February 25, 2017, Bagley's number 54 was retired at Boston College.

=== College statistics ===
Legend
GP	Games played	GS	Games started	MPG	Minutes per game
FG%	Field goal percentage	3P%	3-point field goal percentage	FT%	Free throw percentage
RPG	Rebounds per game	APG	Assists per game	SPG	Steals per game
BPG	Blocks per game	PPG	Points per game	**Bold**	Career high

Year	Team	GP	GS	MPG	FG%	3P%	FT%	RPG	APG	SPG	BPG	PPG
1979–80	Boston College	29	-	-	.481	-	.722	3.1	2.2	1.5	0.0	11.8
1980–81	Boston College	30	29	32.2	.500	-	.788	**3.8**	3.4	1.8	0.1	20.4
1981–82	Boston College	**32**	**31**	**33.3**	**.501**	-	**.797**	**3.8**	**3.8**	**1.9**	**0.2**	**21.1**
Career		91	60	32.7	.496	-	.778	3.6	3.2	1.7	0.1	17.9

== Professional career ==
=== Cleveland Cavaliers ===
Bagley was selected by the Cleveland Cavaliers with the 12th pick of the 1982 NBA draft, and was signed to a three-year contract on September 28, 1982.

He played with the Cavs for five seasons, from 1982 to 1987.

His best season was the 1985–86 season, where Bagley hit then career highs of 11.7 points per game and 9.4 assists per game.

During the 1986–87, Bagley had career highs in both free throw and three point percentage, with .831 and .301, respectively.

=== New Jersey Nets ===
After the 1986–87 season, Cleveland traded Bagley to the New Jersey Nets along with Keith Lee for Darryl Dawkins (who was subsequently sent to the Utah Jazz in a three-way deal) and James Bailey. Bagley's first season with the Nets saw him play all 82 games, the only season he did this, as well as score a career high 12 points per game.

He was also the only Net to play 82 games, and as a result, Bagley was given a multiyear extension on September 6, 1988.

On November 17, 1987, Bagley hit a 75-footer at the buzzer against the Houston Rockets when the first quarter drew to a close. Bagley played in 68 games, missing some due to injury, and lost his starting position at point guard to Lester Conner.

=== Boston Celtics ===
On October 5, 1989, Bagley was traded to the Boston Celtics for two draft choices and an undisclosed amount of cash. He has noted that playing with the Celtics in the Boston Garden has been the highlight of his basketball career.

After playing one season for the Celtics, Bagley did not play the entire 1990–91 season. He began the season on the injured list with tendinitis of the right knee, and received arthroscopic surgery on March 3, 1991, ending his season and even becoming an afterthought, with the Celtics emphasizing Brian Shaw and Dee Brown. However, he did end up starting most of the 1991–92 season, mainly after Brian Shaw was traded to the Miami Heat. Despite the starting role, Bagley was not on the team as the 1992–93 season began, but was re-signed by the Celtics on December 23, 1992. Bagley ended up playing in only 10 games that season, then was granted free agency.

=== CBA ===
He played with the Continental Basketball Association (CBA) during the 1993 off-season, playing for the Columbus Horizon and Rochester Renegade.

=== Atlanta Hawks ===
Prior to the 1993 season, Bagley signed a free agent contract with the Atlanta Hawks, but was released after three appearances on December 13, 1993.

== NBA career statistics ==
Legend
GP	Games played	GS	Games started	MPG	Minutes per game
FG%	Field goal percentage	3P%	3-point field goal percentage	FT%	Free throw percentage
RPG	Rebounds per game	APG	Assists per game	SPG	Steals per game
BPG	Blocks per game	PPG	Points per game	**Bold**	Career high

=== Regular season ===
Year	Team	GP	GS	MPG	FG%	3P%	FT%	RPG	APG	SPG	BPG	PPG
1982–83	Cleveland	68	3	14.6	.432	.000	.762	1.4	2.5	0.8	**0.1**	5.7
1983–84	Cleveland	76	19	22.5	.423	.118	.793	2.1	4.4	1.0	**0.1**	8.9
1984–85	Cleveland	81	65	29.6	**.488**	.115	.749	**3.6**	8.6	**1.6**	**0.1**	9.9
1985–86	Cleveland	78	**77**	31.7	.423	.243	.791	3.5	**9.4**	**1.6**	**0.1**	11.7
1986–87	Cleveland	72	67	30.3	.426	**.301**	.831	3.5	5.3	1.3	**0.1**	10.7
1987–88	New Jersey	**82**	74	**33.8**	.439	.292	.822	3.1	5.8	1.3	**0.1**	**12.0**
1988–89	New Jersey	68	20	24.1	.416	.204	.724	2.1	5.8	1.1	**0.1**	7.4
1989–90	Boston	54	17	20.3	.459	.056	.744	1.6	5.5	0.7	**0.1**	4.3
1991–92	Boston	73	59	23.9	.441	.238	.716	2.2	6.6	0.8	**0.1**	7.2
1992–93	Boston	10	0	9.7	.360	.000	.833	0.7	2.0	0.2	0.0	2.3
1993–94	Atlanta	3	0	4.3	.000	–	**1.000**	0.3	1.0	0.0	0.0	0.7
Career		665	401	25.7	.437	.241	.779	2.6	6.0	1.1	0.1	8.7

=== Playoffs ===
Year	Team	GP	GS	MPG	FG%	3P%	FT%	RPG	APG	SPG	BPG	PPG
1985	Cleveland	4	4	**42.0**	.393	.000	.700	**4.0**	**10.0**	**2.5**	0.0	**12.8**
1990	Boston	5	0	14.0	**.533**	.000	**.750**	0.8	3.4	0.8	**0.2**	3.8
1992	Boston	**10**	**10**	30.8	.442	**.250**	.703	2.7	8.5	0.9	0.1	11.1
Career		19	14	28.7	.434	.125	.706	2.5	7.5	1.2	0.1	9.5

== Personal life ==
Bagley resided in Elgin, Illinois, and coached the Harper College Men's Basketball team. He also ran a 32-team high school summer league, worked at a camp at Harper College, and coached the Chicago Dogs, a semi-pro basketball team. Following his time away from Connecticut, he recently moved back to his home of Bridgeport, CT. Bagley now coaches girls basketball at his alma mater, (Bridgeport) Harding High School.

Bagley has a daughter named Janelle, and a son named C.J., whom he had with his former partner, Varissa Scruggs; the couple also had an infant son named John Rhyce Scruggs-Bagley, who died of a heart problem in 1993. Varissa Scruggs died in 2011.
