= David Russell (basketball) =

American basketball player

Personal information
- Born: January 9, 1960 (age 66) New York City, New York, U.S.
- Listed height: 6 ft 7 in (2.01 m)
- Listed weight: 215 lb (98 kg)

Career information
- High school: Bellport (Brookhaven, New York)
- College: St. John's (1979–1983)
- NBA draft: 1983: 2nd round, 37th overall pick
- Drafted by: Denver Nuggets
- Position: Small forward

Career history
- 1983–1984: Joventut Massana
- 1984–1989: CB Estudiantes
- 1991–1992: Columbus Horizon

Career highlights
- Spanish All-Star Game MVP (1986); First-team All-Big East (1982); 3× Second-team All-Big East (1980, 1981, 1983)
- Stats at Basketball Reference

David Lee Russell (born January 9, 1960) is an American former professional basketball player. From 1979 to 1983, he played four seasons under Lou Carnesecca and alongside Chris Mullin as a member of the St. John's Redmen. In his four years, Russell averaged 14.6 points, 6.8 rebounds, and 1.0 assist on 54.6% field goal shooting.

Russell was drafted in the second round, 37th pick overall by the Denver Nuggets in the 1983 NBA draft. He was waived by the team that summer, and never played a game in the NBA.

Russell went on to play six years in the Spanish Basketball League Liga ACB. He played for several teams, averaging 27.1 points, 6.9 rebounds and 0.7 assists on 58% shooting in his 127 games. He retired from professional basketball in 1989. Russell also played briefly for the Columbus Horizon of the Continental Basketball Association (CBA), appearing in five games in the 1991–92 season.
