= 1982 Midwestern City Conference men's basketball tournament =

- Classification: Division I
- Season: 1981–82
- Teams: 7
- Site: Mabee Center; Tulsa, Oklahoma
- Champions: Evansville (1st title)
- Winning coach: Dick Walters (1st title)
- MVP: Brad Leaf (Evansville)
- Midwestern City Conference men's basketball tournaments

1981–82 Midwestern City Conference men's basketball standings
	Conf.				Overall
Team	W		L	PCT	W		L	PCT
Evansville †	10	–	2	.833	23	–	6	.793
Oral Roberts	8	–	4	.667	18	–	12	.600
Loyola-Chicago	8	–	4	.667	17	–	12	.586
Oklahoma City	6	–	6	.500	14	–	14	.500
Detroit	6	–	6	.500	10	–	17	.370
Butler	3	–	9	.250	7	–	20	.259
Xavier	1	–	11	.083	8	–	20	.286
† 1982 MCC tournament winner

The 1982 Midwestern City Conference men's basketball tournament (now known as the Horizon League men's basketball tournament) was held March 2–4 at Mabee Center in Tulsa, Oklahoma.

Evansville defeated Loyola Chicago in the championship game, 81–72, to win their first MCC/Horizon League men's basketball tournament.

The Purple Aces received an automatic bid to the 1982 NCAA tournament as the #10 seed in the Midwest region.

== Format ==
All seven conference members participated in the tournament and were seeded based on regular season conference records. The top seed (Evansville) was given a bye into the semifinal round while the remaining six teams were placed into the initial quarterfinal round.

== Bracket ==
Quarterfinals; Friday, March 2
5	Detroit	61
4	Oklahoma City	69
3	Loyola Chicago	88
6	Butler	71
7	Xavier	74
2	Oral Roberts	71

Semifinals; Saturday, March 3
1	Evansville	57
5	Oklahoma City	45
3	Loyola Chicago	77
7	Xavier	69

Championship; Sunday, March 4
1	Evansville	81
3	Loyola Chicago	72
