= 1981–82 Marquette Warriors men's basketball team =

American college basketball season

1981–82 Marquette Warriors men's basketball

NCAA tournament, Second Round, L 69–73 vs. Missouri
- Conference: Independent
- Record: 23–9
- Head coach: Hank Raymonds (5th season)
- Home arena: MECCA Arena

1981–82 NCAA Division I men's basketball independents standings
	Conf.				Overall
Team	W		L	PCT	W		L	PCT
No. 2 DePaul		–		–	26	–	2	.929
Marquette		–		–	23	–	9	.719
Dayton		–		–	21	–	9	.700
New Orleans		–		–	18	–	8	.692
UNLV		–		–	20	–	10	.667
Cleveland State		–		–	17	–	10	.630
Southeastern Louisiana		–		–	16	–	11	.593
Southern Mississippi		–		–	15	–	11	.577
Penn State		–		–	15	–	12	.556
Tennessee State		–		–	13	–	12	.520
Eastern Illinois		–		–	14	–	13	.519
Green Bay		–		–	14	–	13	.519
Illinois-Chicago		–		–	14	–	13	.519
Western Illinois		–		–	14	–	13	.519
Charleston Southern		–		–	13	–	13	.500
South Carolina		–		–	14	–	15	.483
UNC Wilmington		–		–	13	–	14	.481
Northern Iowa		–		–	12	–	15	.444
Stetson		–		–	12	–	15	.444
Campbell		–		–	11	–	16	.407
Notre Dame		–		–	10	–	17	.370
U.S. International		–		–	9	–	18	.333
Valparaiso		–		–	9	–	18	.333
Texas-San Antonio		–		–	8	–	19	.296
Nicholls State		–		–	6	–	20	.231
Texas-Rio Grande Valley		–		–	5	–	20	.200
Utica		–		–	4	–	22	.154
Georgia State		–		–	4	–	23	.148
As of Rankings from AP Poll

The 1981–82 Marquette Warriors men's basketball team represented the Marquette University in the 1981–82 season. The Warriors finished the regular season with a record of 23–9. As a 7 seed, the Warriors defeated the 10 seed Evansville in the first round, 67–62. Marquette would fall to Missouri in the second round.

== Roster ==
1981–82 Marquette Warriors men's basketball team
Players
Coaches

Pos.	#	Name	Height	Weight	Year	Hometown
F	22	Dwayne Johnson	6 ft 6 in (1.98 m)	—	Fr	Long Island City, New York
G	20	Mandy Johnson	6 ft 0 in (1.83 m)	175 lb (79 kg)	Fr	Jersey City, NJ
F	52	Marc Marotta	6 ft 7 in (2.01 m)	210 lb (95 kg)	So	Pittsburgh, Pennsylvania
C	32	Dean Marquardt	6 ft 9 in (2.06 m)	215 lb (98 kg)	Sr	Milwaukee, Wisconsin
C	34	Brian Nyenhuis	6 ft 10 in (2.08 m)	200 lb (91 kg)	RS Sr	Oostburg, Wisconsin
G/F	21	Terry Reason	6 ft 5 in (1.96 m)	175 lb (79 kg)	RS Fr	Fresno, California
G	31	Doc Rivers	6 ft 4 in (1.93 m)	185 lb (84 kg)	So	Maywood, Illinois
F	33	Terrell Schlundt	6 ft 7 in (2.01 m)	205 lb (93 kg)	Jr	Antigo, Wisconsin
F	30	Greg Shimon	6 ft 5 in (1.96 m)	185 lb (84 kg)	RS Sr	Brookfield, Wisconsin
F	4	Don Smolinski	6 ft 5 in (1.96 m)	185 lb (84 kg)	So	Menasha, Wisconsin
G	10	Mike Wilson	6 ft 3 in (1.91 m)	175 lb (79 kg)	Sr	Memphis, Tennessee

Head coach

- Hank Raymonds

Assistant coach(es)

Legend

- (C) Team captain
- (S) Suspended
- (I) Ineligible
- (W) Walk-on
- Injured
- Current redshirt

== Schedule ==
Date time, TV	Rank^{#}	Opponent^{#}	Result	Record	Site city, state
Regular season
November 27		vs. McNeese State	W 88–57	1–0	Sullivan Arena (3,200); Anchorage, Alaska
November 28		vs. Iona	W 67–54	2–0	Sullivan Arena (3,600); Anchorage, Alaska
November 29		vs. Southwestern Louisiana	L 64–81	2–1	Sullivan Arena (3,800); Anchorage, Alaska
December 2		Ohio	W 49–45	3–1	MECCA Arena (11,052); Milwaukee, WI
December 5		No. 6 Iowa	L 65–68 ^{OT}	3–2	MECCA Arena (11,052); Milwaukee, WI
December 9		at Old Dominion	W 75–70	4–2	Norfolk Scope (7,259); Norfolk, Virginia
December 12		Wake Forest	L 65–68	4–3	MECCA Arena (11,052); Milwaukee, WI
December 19		Minnesota	L 54–76	4–4	MECCA Arena (11,052); Milwaukee, WI
December 22		at Stanford	W 66–65	5–4	Maples Pavilion (3,031); Stanford, California
December 28		East Tennessee State	W 96–84	6–4	MECCA Arena (10,214); Milwaukee, WI
December 29		Arizona State	W 74–68	7–4	MECCA Arena (10,652); Milwaukee, WI
January 2		at Loyola (IL)	W 81–69	8–4	Alumni Gym (8,783); Chicago, Il
January 6		at Kansas State	L 65–70	8–5	Ahearn Field House (11,010); Manhattan, Kansas
January 9		Southwestern Louisiana	W 80–67	9–5	MECCA Arena (11,052); Milwaukee, WI
January 12		Maine	W 73–46	10–5	MECCA Arena (10,140); Milwaukee, WI
January 16		Creighton	W 82–61	11–5	MECCA Arena (11,052); Milwaukee, WI
January 20		at Xavier	W 63–50	12–5	Riverfront Coliseum (2,671); Cincinnati, OH
January 23		at Iona	W 75–67	13–5	Madison Square Garden (6,219); New York, NY
January 27		at Memphis State	L 70–77	13–6	Mid-South Coliseum (11,200); Memphis, Tennessee
January 30		at Notre Dame	W 70–62	14–6	Joyce Center (11,345); South Bend, Indiana
February 2		UNC Charlotte	W 67–66	15–6	MECCA Arena (10,703); Milwaukee, WI
February 6		No. 4 DePaul	L 66–67	15–7	MECCA Arena (11,052); Milwaukee, WI
February 9		St. Bonaventure	W 40–35	16–7	MECCA Arena (11,052); Milwaukee, WI
February 13		Virginia Tech	W 52–51	17–7	MECCA Arena (11,052); Milwaukee, WI
February 16		Duquesne	W 69–55	18–7	MECCA Arena (11,052); Milwaukee, WI
February 20		Dayton	W 72–58	19–7	MECCA Arena (11,052); Milwaukee, WI
February 24		at Detroit	W 78–61	20–7	Calihan Hall (4,520); Detroit, Michigan
February 28		at Louisville	L 68–80	20–8	Freedom Hall (16,613); Louisville, Kentucky
March 6		at Stetson	W 72–61	21–8	Edmunds Center (5,063); DeLand, Florida
March 9		Wisconsin	W 94–64	22–8	MECCA Arena (11,052); Milwaukee, WI
NCAA tournament
March 11	(7 MW)	vs. (10 MW) Evansville; First Round	W 67–62	23–8	Mabee Center (8,680); Tulsa, Oklahoma
March 13	(7 MW)	vs. (2 MW) No. 5 Missouri; Second Round	L 69–73	23–9	Mabee Center (10,775); Tulsa, Oklahoma
*Non-conference game. ^{#}Rankings from AP Poll. (#) Tournament seedings in parentheses. MW=Midwest.

== Team players drafted into the NBA ==
Round	Pick	Player	NBA club
3	47	Michael Wilson	Cleveland Cavaliers
