= 1981–82 Southwestern Louisiana Ragin' Cajuns men's basketball team =

American college basketball season

1981–82 Southwestern Louisiana Ragin' Cajuns men's basketball

Great Alaska Shootout champions Southland regular season and tournament champions

NCAA tournament
- Conference: Southland Conference
- Record: 24–8 (8–2 Southland)
- Head coach: Bobby Paschal (5th season)
- Home arena: Blackham Coliseum

1981–82 Southland Conference men's basketball standings
	Conf.				Overall
Team	W		L	PCT	W		L	PCT
SW Louisiana †	8	–	2	.800	24	–	8	.750
Lamar	7	–	3	.700	22	–	7	.759
Texas-Arlington	6	–	4	.600	16	–	12	.571
McNeese State	4	–	6	.400	14	–	15	.483
Arkansas State	3	–	7	.300	15	–	11	.577
Louisiana Tech	2	–	8	.200	11	–	16	.407
North Texas State	0	–	0	–	15	–	12	.556
† 1982 Southland tournament winner Rankings from AP poll

The 1981–82 Southwestern Louisiana Ragin' Cajuns men's basketball team represented the University of Southwestern Louisiana as an NCAA Independent during the 1981–82 NCAA Division I men's basketball season. The Ragin' Cajuns, led by 6th-year head coach Bobby Paschal, played their home games at Blackham Coliseum in Lafayette, Louisiana. After winning the conference regular season and tournament titles, SW Louisiana received an automatic bid to the NCAA tournament. As the No. 8 seed in the East region, SW Louisiana was defeated by Tennessee in the opening round, 61–57.

== Roster ==
1981–82 Southwestern Louisiana Ragin' Cajuns men's basketball team
Players
Coaches

Pos.	#	Name	Height	Weight	Year	Hometown
F		Graylin Warner	6 ft 8 in (2.03 m)	—	So
F		Dion Brown	6 ft 7 in (2.01 m)	—	So

Head coach

- Bobby Paschal (Stetson)

Assistant coach(es)

Legend

- (C) Team captain
- (S) Suspended
- (I) Ineligible
- (W) Walk-on
- Injured
- Current redshirt

== Schedule and results ==
Date time, TV	Rank^{#}	Opponent^{#}	Result	Record	Site (attendance) city, state
Regular season
Nov 27, 1981*		vs. No. 5 Georgetown; Great Alaska Shootout	W 70–61	1–0	Buckner Fieldhouse (3,600); Fort Richardson, Alaska
Nov 28, 1981*		vs. Washington State; Great Alaska Shootout	W 72–59	2–0	Buckner Fieldhouse (3,600); Fort Richardson, Alaska
Nov 29, 1981*		vs. Marquette; Great Alaska Shootout	W 81–64	3–0	Buckner Fieldhouse (3,600); Fort Richardson, Alaska
Dec 3, 1981*		Siena Heights	W 103–67	4–0	Blackham Coliseum; Lafayette, Louisiana
Dec 5, 1981*		Southern Miss	W 66–64	5–0	Blackham Coliseum; Lafayette, Louisiana
Dec 8, 1981*		Louisiana College	W 91–59	6–0	Blackham Coliseum; Lafayette, Louisiana
Dec 11, 1981*	No. 18	Pacific; Bayou Classic	W 67–61	7–0	Blackham Coliseum; Lafayette, Louisiana
Dec 12, 1981*	No. 18	Fresno State; Bayou Classic	W 57–51	8–0	Blackham Coliseum; Lafayette, Louisiana
Dec 14, 1981*	No. 15	New Orleans	L 65–70	8–1	Blackham Coliseum; Lafayette, Louisiana
Dec 19, 1981*	No. 15	at Memphis State	L 70–82	8–2	Mid-South Coliseum; Memphis, Tennessee
Jan 2, 1982*		Northeast Louisiana	W 82–69	9–2	Blackham Coliseum; Lafayette, Louisiana
Jan 5, 1982*		Buffalo	W 99–57	10–2	Blackham Coliseum; Lafayette, Louisiana
Jan 9, 1982*		at Marquette	L 67–80	10–3	MECCA Arena (11,052); Milwaukee, Wisconsin
Jan 12, 1982*		Texas–Pan American	W 113–89	11–3	Blackham Coliseum; Lafayette, Louisiana
Jan 16, 1982*		at New Orleans	W 70–68	12–3	New Orleans, Louisiana
Jan 18, 1982*		at Stetson	L 69–77	12–4	Edmunds Center; DeLand, Florida
Jan 21, 1982		Louisiana Tech	W 65–55	13–4 (1–0)	Blackham Coliseum; Lafayette, Louisiana
Jan 23, 1982*		Stetson	W 72–54	14–4	Blackham Coliseum; Lafayette, Louisiana
Jan 25, 1982		at Louisiana Tech	W 71–51	15–4 (2–0)	Ruston, Louisiana
Jan 30, 1982		Texas–Arlington	W 96–82	16–4 (3–0)	Blackham Coliseum; Lafayette, Louisiana
Feb 1, 1982		at Lamar	L 75–82	16–5 (3–1)	Beaumont, Texas
Feb 3, 1982*		at Texas–Pan American	W 75–72	17–5	Edinburg, Texas
Feb 6, 1982		McNeese State	W 85–84	18–5 (4–1)	Blackham Coliseum; Lafayette, Louisiana
Feb 8, 1982		at Arkansas State	W 62–54	19–5 (5–1)	Jonesboro, Arkansas
Feb 13, 1982		at Texas–Arlington	L 74–84	19–6 (5–2)	Arlington, Texas
Feb 15, 1982*		at Southern Miss	L 75–84	19–7	Reed Green Coliseum; Hattiesburg, Mississippi
Feb 20, 1982		Lamar	W 63–59	20–7 (6–2)	Blackham Coliseum; Lafayette, Louisiana
Feb 22, 1982		at McNeese State	W 81–77	21–7 (7–2)	Lake Charles Civic Center; Lake Charles, Louisiana
Feb 25, 1982		Arkansas State	W 81–70	22–7 (8–2)	Blackham Coliseum; Lafayette, Louisiana
Southland Tournament
Mar 6, 1982*	(1)	(4) McNeese State; Semifinals	W 105–69	23–7	Blackham Coliseum; Lafayette, Louisiana
Mar 7, 1982*	(1)	(3) Texas–Arlington; Championship game	W 81–75	24–7	Blackham Coliseum; Lafayette, Louisiana
NCAA Tournament
Mar 12, 1982*	(8 ME)	vs. (9 ME) Tennessee; First round	L 57–61	24–8	Market Square Arena; Indianapolis, Indiana
*Non-conference game. ^{#}Rankings from AP Poll. (#) Tournament seedings in parentheses. ME=Mideast. All times are in Central Time.
