= 1981–82 Oregon State Beavers men's basketball team =

American college basketball season

1981–82 Oregon State Beavers men's basketball

Pac-10 champions

NCAA tournament, Elite Eight
- Conference: Pac-10 Conference

Ranking
- Coaches: No. 4
- AP: No. 4
- Record: 25–5 (16–2 Pac-10)
- Head coach: Ralph Miller (12th season)
- MVP: Lester Conner
- Home arena: Gill Coliseum

1981–82 Pacific-10 Conference men's basketball standings
	Conf.				Overall
Team	W		L	PCT	W		L	PCT
No. 4 Oregon State	16	–	2	.889	25	–	5	.833
No. 19 UCLA	14	–	4	.778	21	–	6	.778
USC	13	–	5	.722	19	–	9	.679
Washington	11	–	7	.611	19	–	10	.655
Washington State	10	–	8	.556	16	–	14	.533
California	8	–	10	.444	14	–	13	.519
Arizona State	8	–	10	.444	13	–	14	.481
Oregon	4	–	14	.222	9	–	18	.333
Arizona	4	–	14	.222	9	–	18	.333
Stanford	2	–	16	.111	7	–	20	.259
As of April 15, 1982; Rankings from AP Poll

The 1981–82 Oregon State Beavers men's basketball team represented the Oregon State University as a member of the Pacific 10 Conference during the 1981–82 NCAA Division I men's basketball season. They were led by twelfth-year head coach Ralph Miller and played their home games on campus at Gill Coliseum in Corvallis, Oregon.

Oregon State finished the regular season at 23–4 (16–2 Pac-10), won a third consecutive conference title (by two games), and were ranked fourth in both polls. Despite dropping the regular season finale at Arizona State, they did not drop in the rankings, and were seeded second in the West region of the NCAA tournament.

The Beavers received an opening round bye, defeated Pepperdine in Pullman, and third-seeded Idaho in the Sweet Sixteen at Provo. In the regional final (Elite Eight), Oregon State lost 45–69 to eventual national runner-up Georgetown, and finished at 25–5.

== Roster ==
1981–82 Oregon State Beavers men's basketball team
Players
Coaches

Pos.	#	Name	Height	Weight	Year	Hometown
G	32	Lester Conner	6 ft 4 in (1.93 m)	180 lb (82 kg)	Sr	Oakland, California
F	52	Charlie Sitton	6 ft 8 in (2.03 m)	205 lb (93 kg)	So	McMinnville, Oregon
F	45	A.C. Green	6 ft 9 in (2.06 m)	215 lb (98 kg)	Fr	Portland, Oregon

Head coach

- Ralph Miller

Assistant coach(es)

Legend

- (C) Team captain
- (S) Suspended
- (I) Ineligible
- (W) Walk-on
- Injured
- Current redshirt

== Schedule and results ==
Date time, TV	Rank^{#}	Opponent^{#}	Result	Record	Site city, state
Regular season
Nov 28, 1981*		Bradley	W 81–55	1–0	Gill Coliseum; Corvallis, Oregon
Dec 4, 1981*		at No. 15 Brigham Young	W 56–44	2–0	Marriott Center; Provo, Utah
Dec 11, 1981*	No. 19	at Portland	L 63–68	2–1	Howard Hall; Portland, Oregon
Dec 12, 1981*	No. 19	Pepperdine	W 84–69	3–1	Gill Coliseum; Corvallis, Oregon
Dec 18, 1981*	No. 20	vs. Penn; Suntory Bowl	W 102–64	4–1	Tokyo, Japan
Dec 20, 1981*	No. 20	vs. No. 3 Louisville; Suntory Bowl	W 62–56	5–1	Tokyo, Japan
Dec 26, 1981*	No. 16	vs. Pittsburgh; Far West Classic	W 88–58	6–1	Memorial Coliseum; Portland, Oregon
Dec 27, 1981*; 7:00 p.m.	No. 15	vs. Idaho; Far West Classic	L 49–71	6–2	Memorial Coliseum (12,083); Portland, Oregon
Dec 28, 1981*	No. 15	at Portland; Far West Classic	W 61–55	7–2	Memorial Coliseum; Portland, Oregon
Jan 2, 1982	No. 15	Arizona State	W 74–43	8–2 (1–0)	Gill Coliseum; Corvallis, Oregon
Jan 4, 1982	No. 17	Arizona	W 68–55	9–2 (2–0)	Gill Coliseum; Corvallis, Oregon
Jan 9, 1982	No. 17	at California	W 74–43	10–2 (3–0)	Harmon Gym; Berkeley, California
Jan 11, 1982	No. 15	at Stanford	W 81–38	11–2 (4–0)	Maples Pavilion; Stanford, California
Jan 16, 1982; 8:00 p.m.	No. 15	at Oregon	W 76–61	12–2 (5–0)	McArthur Court (9,318); Eugene, Oregon
Jan 22, 1982	No. 12	Washington State	W 64–48	13–2 (6–0)	Gill Coliseum (10,000); Corvallis, Oregon
Jan 23, 1982; 7:30 p.m.	No. 12	Washington	W 63–43	14–2 (7–0)	Gill Coliseum (10,000); Corvallis, Oregon
Jan 29, 1982	No. 8	at UCLA	L 68–74	14–3 (7–1)	Pauley Pavilion (12,237); Los Angeles, California
Jan 30, 1982	No. 8	at USC	W 72–55	15–3 (8–1)	L.A. Sports Arena (11,004); Los Angeles, California
Feb 6, 1982	No. 10	Stanford	W 111–81	16–3 (9–1)	Gill Coliseum (10,000); Corvallis, Oregon
Feb 8, 1982	No. 6	California	W 57–50	17–3 (10–1)	Gill Coliseum (10,000); Corvallis, Oregon
Feb 13, 1982	No. 6	Oregon	W 94–51	18–3 (11–1)	Gill Coliseum (10,000); Corvallis, Oregon
Feb 18, 1982	No. 5	Washington	W 55–44	19–3 (12–1)	Hec Edmundson Pavilion (8,978); Seattle, Washington
Feb 20, 1982; 7:30 p.m.	No. 5	at Washington State	W 40–36	20–3 (13–1)	Beasley Coliseum (9,350); Pullman, Washington
Feb 26, 1982	No. 4	No. 20 UCLA	W 72–58	21–3 (14–1)	Gill Coliseum (10,000); Corvallis, Oregon
Feb 27, 1982	No. 4	USC	W 45–36	22–3 (15–1)	Gill Coliseum (10,000); Corvallis, Oregon
Mar 5, 1982	No. 4	at Arizona	W 92–64	23–3 (16–1)	McKale Center (7,430); Tucson, Arizona
Mar 6, 1982; 3:00 p.m.	No. 4	at Arizona State	L 60–68	23–4 (16–2)	ASU Activities Center (4,700); Tempe, Arizona
NCAA Tournament
Mar 12, 1982	(2W) No. 4	Bye; First round			
Mar 14, 1982*; 4:08 p.m., CBS	(2 W) No. 4	vs. (7 W) Pepperdine; Second Round	W 70–51	24–4	Beasley Coliseum (12,340); Pullman, Washington
Mar 18, 1982*; 6:10 p.m., CBS	(2 W) No. 4	vs. (3 W) No. 8 Idaho; West Regional semifinal – Sweet Sixteen	W 60–42	25–4	Marriott Center (15,237); Provo, Utah
Mar 20, 1982*; 11:55 a.m., CBS	(2 W) No. 4	vs. (1 W) No. 6 Georgetown; West Regional final – Elite Eight	L 45–69	25–5	Marriott Center (14,986); Provo, Utah
*Non-conference game. ^{#}Rankings from AP Poll. (#) Tournament seedings in parentheses. W=West. All times are in Pacific.

== Awards and honors ==
- Lester Conner – Pac-10 Player of the Year

== NBA draft ==
Round	Pick	Player	NBA club
1	14	Lester Conner	Golden State Warriors
