= 1981–82 UCLA Bruins men's basketball team =

American college basketball season

1981–82 UCLA Bruins men's basketball
- Conference: Pacific-10

Ranking
- AP: No. 19
- Record: 21–6 (14–4, 2nd Pac-10)
- Head coach: Larry Farmer (1st season)
- Assistant coaches: Craig Impelman; Chris Lippert; Kevin O'Connor
- Home arena: Pauley Pavilion

1981–82 Pacific-10 Conference men's basketball standings
| | Conf. | | | | Overall |
| Team | W | | L | PCT | W | | L | PCT |
|---|---|---|---|---|---|---|---|---|
| No. 4 Oregon State | 16 | – | 2 | .889 | 25 | – | 5 | .833 |
| No. 19 UCLA | 14 | – | 4 | .778 | 21 | – | 6 | .778 |
| USC | 13 | – | 5 | .722 | 19 | – | 9 | .679 |
| Washington | 11 | – | 7 | .611 | 19 | – | 10 | .655 |
| Washington State | 10 | – | 8 | .556 | 16 | – | 14 | .533 |
| California | 8 | – | 10 | .444 | 14 | – | 13 | .519 |
| Arizona State | 8 | – | 10 | .444 | 13 | – | 14 | .481 |
| Oregon | 4 | – | 14 | .222 | 9 | – | 18 | .333 |
| Arizona | 4 | – | 14 | .222 | 9 | – | 18 | .333 |
| Stanford | 2 | – | 16 | .111 | 7 | – | 20 | .259 |
As of April 15, 1982; Rankings from AP Poll

The 1981–82 UCLA Bruins men's basketball team represented the University of California, Los Angeles in the 1981–82 NCAA Division I men's basketball season. Larry Farmer was the new head coach, the fourth since the legendary John Wooden. The Bruins started the season ranked 2nd in the nation (AP Poll). On December 19, the Bruins hosted #7 DePaul, winning 87–75. UCLA's team finished 2nd in the Pac-10 regular season and finished 19th in the AP poll.

== Starting lineup ==
| Position | Player | Class |
|---|---|---|
| F | Kenny Fields | So. |
| F | Mike Sanders | Sr. |
| C | Stuart Gray | So. |
| G | Ralph Jackson | So. |
| G | Rod Foster | Jr. |

== Roster ==
1981–82 UCLA Bruins men's basketball team
Players
Coaches

| Pos. | # | Name | Height | Weight | Year | Hometown |
|---|---|---|---|---|---|---|
| F | 45 | Tony Anderson (C) | 6 ft 6 in (1.98 m) | — | Sr |
| F | 30 | Darren Daye | 6 ft 7 in (2.01 m) | — | Jr | Des Moines, Iowa |
| C | 35 | Mark Eaton | 7 ft 4 in (2.24 m) | — | Sr | Inglewood, California |
| F | 54 | Kenny Fields | 6 ft 7 in (2.01 m) | — | So | Iowa City, Iowa |
| G | 10 | Rod Foster | 6 ft 1 in (1.85 m) | — | Jr | Birmingham, Alabama |
| C | 55 | Stuart Gray | 7 ft 0 in (2.13 m) | — | Fr | Panama Canal Zone, Panama |
| G | 14 | Michael Holton | 6 ft 4 in (1.93 m) | — | Jr | Seattle, Washington |
| G | 3 | Ralph Jackson | 6 ft 2 in (1.88 m) | — | So |
| G | 25 | Nigel Miguel | 6 ft 5 in (1.96 m) | — | Fr | British Honduras |
| F | 52 | Mike Sanders (C) | 6 ft 7 in (2.01 m) | — | Sr | Vidalia, Louisiana |
| F | 44 | Dean Sears | 6 ft 7 in (2.01 m) | — | Sr |
| C | 32 | Brad Wright | 6 ft 10 in (2.08 m) | — | Fr | Hollywood, California |

Head coach

Larry Farmer (UCLA)

Assistant coach(es)

- Craig Impelman
- Chris Lippert
- Kevin O'Connor

Legend

- (C) Team captain
- (S) Suspended
- (I) Ineligible
- (W) Walk-on
- Injured
- Current redshirt

Roster

== Schedule ==
| Date time, TV | Rank^{#} | Opponent^{#} | Result | Record | Site city, state |
Regular Season
| November 27, 1981 | No. 2 | BYU | L 75–79 | 0–1 | Pauley Pavilion (12,172); Los Angeles, CA |
| November 28, 1981 | No. 2 | Pepperdine | W 76–69 | 1–1 | Pauley Pavilion (11,257); Los Angeles, CA |
| December 3, 1981 | No. 8 | at Rutgers | L 54–57 | 1–2 | Brendan Byrne Arena (13,681); East Rutherford, NJ |
| December 5, 1981 | No. 8 | at Notre Dame | W 75–49 | 2–2 | Athletic & Convocation Center (11,345); Notre Dame, IN |
| December 12, 1981 | No. 17 | Boston University | W 77–43 | 3–2 | Pauley Pavilion (9,182); Los Angeles, CA |
| December 19, 1981 | No. 17 | No. 7 DePaul | W 87–75 | 4–2 | Pauley Pavilion (12,293); Los Angeles, CA |
| December 23, 1981 | No. 15 | at LSU | W 83–76 | 5–2 | Louisiana Superdome (28,880); New Orleans, LA |
| December 29, 1981 | No. 16 | Maryland | W 90–57 | 6–2 | Pauley Pavilion (12,314); Los Angeles, CA |
| January 2, 1982 | No. 16 | at Washington State | L 51–57 ^{3OT} | 6–3 (0–1) | Beasley Coliseum (4,700); Pullman, WA |
| January 4, 1982 | No. 16 | at Washington | L 50–56 | 6–4 (0–2) | Hec Edmundson Pavilion (3,220); Seattle, WA |
| January 9, 1982 | No. 19 | at USC | L 71–86 | 6–5 (0–3) | Los Angeles Memorial Sports Arena (12,480); Los Angeles, CA |
| January 16, 1982 | | Arizona | W 65–56 | 7–5 (1–3) | Pauley Pavilion (11,124); Los Angeles, CA |
| January 18, 1982 | | Arizona State | W 75–59 | 8–5 (2–3) | Pauley Pavilion (9,451); Los Angeles, CA |
| January 22, 1982 | | at Stanford | W 42–34 | 9–5 (3–3) | Maples Pavilion (7,104); Stanford, CA |
| January 23, 1982 | | at California | W 83–56 | 10–5 (4–3) | Harmon Gym (6,500); Berkeley, CA |
| January 29, 1982 | | No. 8 Oregon State | W 74–68 | 11–5 (5–3) | Pauley Pavilion (12,237); Los Angeles, CA |
| January 30, 1982 | | Oregon | W 84–61 | 12–5 (6–3) | Pauley Pavilion (10,307); Los Angeles, CA |
| February 5, 1982 | | USC | W 69–66 | 13–5 (7–3) | Pauley Pavilion (12,529); Los Angeles, CA |
| February 7, 1982 | | Notre Dame | W 48–47 | 14–5 | Pauley Pavilion (10,244); Los Angeles, CA |
| February 12, 1982 | | at Arizona | W 88–73 | 15–5 (8–3) | McKale Center (8,960); Tucson, AZ |
| February 13, 1982 | | at Arizona State | W 72–60 | 16–5 (9–3) | ASU Activity Center (8,658); Tempe, AZ |
| February 19, 1982 | | California | W 70–65 ^{OT} | 17–5 (10–3) | Pauley Pavilion (10,358); Los Angeles, CA |
| February 20, 1982 | | Stanford | W 79–53 | 18–5 (11–3) | Pauley Pavilion (7,893); Los Angeles, CA |
| February 26, 1982 | No. 20 | at No. 4 Oregon State | L 58–72 | 18–6 (11–4) | Gill Coliseum (10,000); Corvallis, OR |
| February 27, 1982 | No. 20 | at Oregon | W 88–66 | 19–6 (12–4) | McArthur Court (6,473); Eugene, OR |
| March 5, 1982 | No. 19 | Washington | W 68–67 | 20–6 (13–4) | Pauley Pavilion (11,748); Los Angeles, CA |
| March 6, 1982 | No. 19 | Washington State | W 57–54 | 21–6 (14–4) | Pauley Pavilion (11,309); Los Angeles, CA |
*Non-conference game. ^{#}Rankings from AP Poll. (#) Tournament seedings in parentheses. All times are in Pacific Time.

== Notes ==
- This UCLA team didn't live up to the pre-season expectations as it was ranked #2 in the AP Poll, but finished ranked only 19th.
- Because of probation, for the first time in 16 years (since 1966) UCLA did not participate in the NCAA Tournament.
