= 1981 Bradley vs. Cincinnati men's basketball game =

Longest men's basketball game in NCAA Division I history

Longest NCAA Division I men's basketball game in history
Regular season game
Cincinnati Bearcats	Bradley Braves
(6–1)	(5–2)
75	73
Head coach: Ed Badger	Head coach: Dick Versace
	1st half	2nd half	OT	2OT	3OT	4OT	5OT	6OT	7OT	Total
Cincinnati Bearcats	35	26	2	2	0	2	4	2	2	75
Bradley Braves	40	21	2	2	0	2	4	2	0	73
- Date: Monday, December 21, 1981
- Venue: Robertson Memorial Field House, Peoria, Illinois
- Attendance: 7,300

The 1981 Bradley vs. Cincinnati men's basketball game is the longest NCAA Division I men's basketball game ever played and tied for the most overtime periods, regardless of NCAA classification, with seven. The University of Cincinnati visited Bradley University on December 21, 1981, and defeated them 75–73 after 75 minutes of game time. Little-used bench player Doug Schloemer scored on a 15-foot jump shot with one second remaining to propel the Bearcats to victory.

At the end of regulation, which was two 20-minute halves, the score was tied at 61 apiece. Both teams played keep away throughout each overtime period; only once, during the fifth overtime, did a team take more than a two-point lead. In the 35 additional minutes of playing time, Cincinnati only scored 14 more points while Bradley only mustered 12. The shot clock had not yet been introduced in NCAA basketball. Nine players recorded 60 or more minutes of playing time. Two players—Bradley's center Donald Reese and Cincinnati's guard Bobby Austin—each played 73 minutes, jointly setting the NCAA all-time single game minutes played record.

Three other times has an NCAA Division I men's basketball game reached six overtime periods: Niagara defeated Siena 88–81 in 1953, Minnesota defeated Purdue 59–56 in 1955, and most recently Syracuse defeated Connecticut 127–117 in 2009.
