= 1981–82 DePaul Blue Demons men's basketball team =

American college basketball season

1981–82 DePaul Blue Demons men's basketball
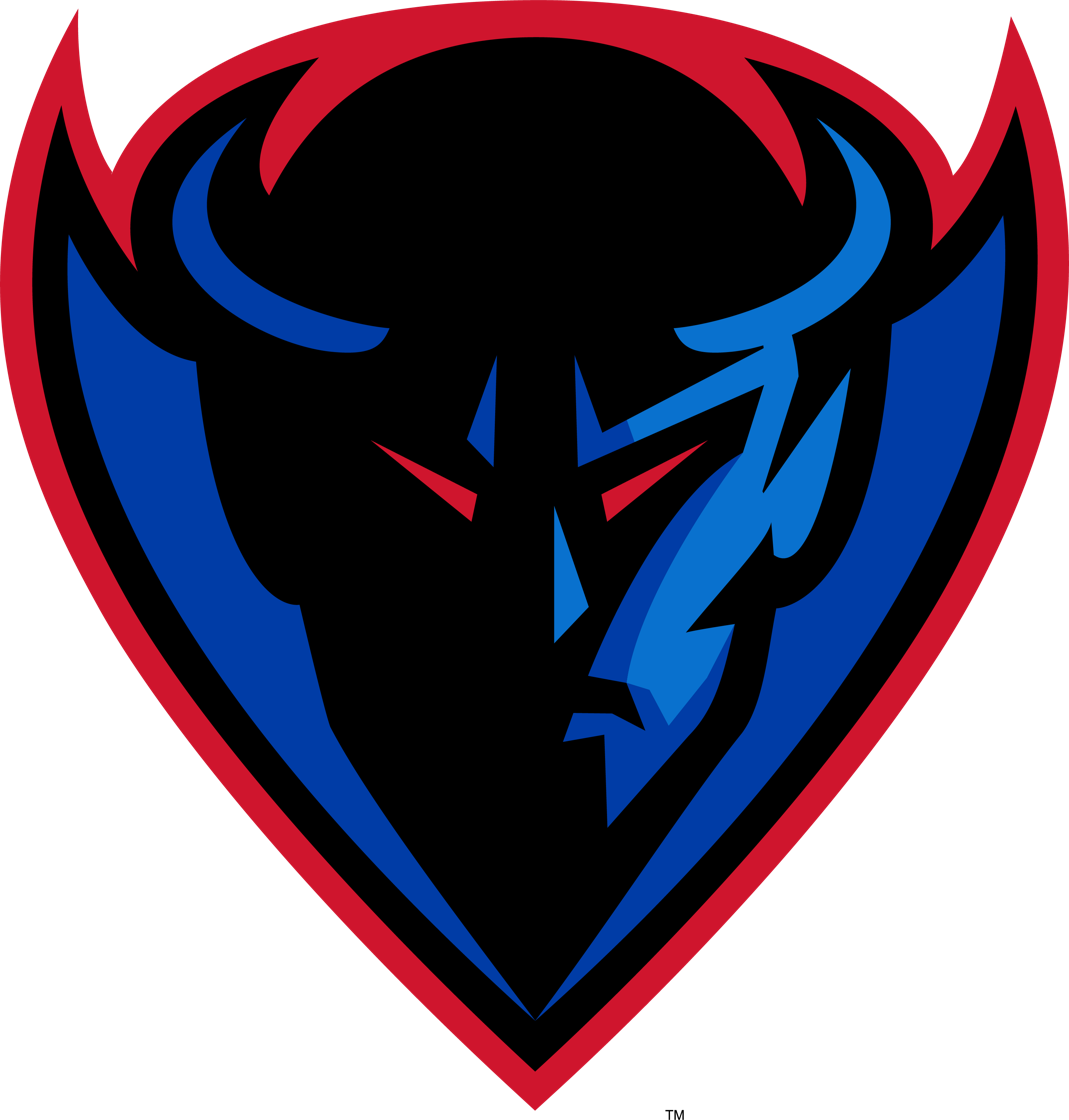

NCAA tournament, Second Round
- Conference: Independent

Ranking
- Coaches: No. 2
- AP: No. 2
- Record: 26–2
- Head coach: Ray Meyer (40th season)
- Assistant coaches: Joey Meyer (8th season); Jim Molinari (3rd season)
- Home arena: Rosemont Horizon

1981–82 NCAA Division I men's basketball independents standings
	Conf.				Overall
Team	W		L	PCT	W		L	PCT
No. 2 DePaul		–		–	26	–	2	.929
Marquette		–		–	23	–	9	.719
Dayton		–		–	21	–	9	.700
New Orleans		–		–	18	–	8	.692
UNLV		–		–	20	–	10	.667
Cleveland State		–		–	17	–	10	.630
Southeastern Louisiana		–		–	16	–	11	.593
Southern Mississippi		–		–	15	–	11	.577
Penn State		–		–	15	–	12	.556
Tennessee State		–		–	13	–	12	.520
Eastern Illinois		–		–	14	–	13	.519
Green Bay		–		–	14	–	13	.519
Illinois-Chicago		–		–	14	–	13	.519
Western Illinois		–		–	14	–	13	.519
Charleston Southern		–		–	13	–	13	.500
South Carolina		–		–	14	–	15	.483
UNC Wilmington		–		–	13	–	14	.481
Northern Iowa		–		–	12	–	15	.444
Stetson		–		–	12	–	15	.444
Campbell		–		–	11	–	16	.407
Notre Dame		–		–	10	–	17	.370
U.S. International		–		–	9	–	18	.333
Valparaiso		–		–	9	–	18	.333
Texas-San Antonio		–		–	8	–	19	.296
Nicholls State		–		–	6	–	20	.231
Texas-Rio Grande Valley		–		–	5	–	20	.200
Utica		–		–	4	–	22	.154
Georgia State		–		–	4	–	23	.148
As of Rankings from AP Poll

The 1981–82 DePaul Blue Demons men's basketball team represented DePaul University during the 1981–82 NCAA Division I men's basketball season. They were led by head coach Ray Meyer, in his 40th season, and played their home games at the Rosemont Horizon in Rosemont.

== Roster ==
1981–82 DePaul Blue Demons men's basketball team
Players
Coaches

Pos.	#	Name	Height	Weight	Year	Previous school	Hometown
F	23	Tyrone Corbin	6 ft 6 in (1.98 m)	210 lb (95 kg)	Fr	A. C. Flora	Columbia, SC
F	32	Terry Cummings	6 ft 9 in (2.06 m)	220 lb (100 kg)	Jr	Carver	Chicago, IL
G	44	Skip Dillard	6 ft 3 in (1.91 m)	200 lb (91 kg)	Sr		Chicago, IL

Head coach

- Ray Meyer

Assistant coach(es)

- Joey Meyer
- Jim Molinari

Legend

- (C) Team captain
- (S) Suspended
- (I) Ineligible
- (W) Walk-on
- Injured
- Current redshirt

Roster

== Schedule ==
Date time, TV	Rank^{#}	Opponent^{#}	Result	Record	Site city, state
Regular season
December 1	No. 7	at UI Chicago	W 78–53	1–0	UIC Physical Education Building (5,222); Chicago, Illinois
December 5	No. 7	Purdue	W 73–67	2–0	Allstate Arena (17,494); Rosemont, Illinois
December 9	No. 7	at Gonzaga	W 69–56	3–0	Charlotte Y. Martin Centre (4,722); Spokane, Washington
December 12	No. 7	at Santa Clara	W 80–58	4–0	Leavey Center (5,000); Santa Clara, California
December 15	No. 7	Western Michigan	W 88–46	5–0	Allstate Arena (13,597); Rosemont, Illinois
December 19	No. 7	at No. 17 UCLA	L 75–87	5–1	Pauley Pavilion (12,293); Los Angeles, CA
December 22	No. 13	Maine	W 90–67	6–1	Allstate Arena (10,141); Rosemont, Illinois
December 26	No. 13	Louisville	W 75–68	7–1	Allstate Arena (17,494); Rosemont, Illinois
December 28	No. 13	Illinois State	W 74–58	8–1	Allstate Arena (15,127); Rosemont, Illinois
December 30	No. 8	vs. Northern Illinois	W 55–46	9–1	(9,000)
January 2	No. 8	Penn State	W 86–60	10–1	Allstate Arena (12,321); Rosemont, Illinois
January 4	No. 8	Saint Mary's (CA)	W 96–72	11–1	Allstate Arena (10,121); Rosemont, Illinois
January 9	No. 5	Dayton	W 71–69	12–1	Allstate Arena (12,320); Rosemont, Illinois
January 11	No. 5	at Creighton	W 76–67	13–1	Omaha Civic Auditorium (7,054); Omaha, Nebraska
January 13	No. 4	South Carolina	W 92–59	14–1	Allstate Arena (11,210); Rosemont, Illinois
January 16	No. 4	at Old Dominion	W 70–60	15–1	Norfolk Scope (10,253); Norfolk, Virginia
January 23	No. 4	UAB	W 79–68	16–1	Allstate Arena (14,187); Rosemont, Illinois
January 27	No. 4	at Saint Louis	W 99–80	17–1	St. Louis Arena (6,813); St. Louis, Missouri
January 30	No. 4	at Syracuse	W 92–87	18–1	Carrier Dome (26,143); Syracuse, NY
February 3	No. 4	Saint Joseph's	W 46–44	19–1	Allstate Arena (12,283); Rosemont, Illinois
February 6	No. 4	at Marquette	W 67–66	20–1	MECCA Arena (11,052); Milwaukee, WI
February 10	No. 3	Evansville	W 59–58	21–1	Allstate Arena (13,137); Rosemont, Illinois
February 12	No. 3	Loyola (IL)	W 98–90	22–1	Allstate Arena (17,194); Rosemont, Illinois
February 15	No. 3	Ohio	W 83–61	23–1	Allstate Arena (13,180); Rosemont, Illinois
February 17	No. 3	at Detroit	W 74–70	24–1	Calihan Hall (8,132); Detroit, Michigan
February 24	No. 3	at Furman	W 75–74	25–1	Memorial Auditorium (5,287); Greenville, SC
February 28	No. 3	at Notre Dame	W 81–69	26–1	Joyce Center (11,345); South Bend, Indiana
NCAA Tournament
March 14	(1 MW) No. 2	vs. (8 MW) Boston College; Second Round	L 75–82	26–2	Reunion Arena (12,719); Dallas, Texas
*Non-conference game. ^{#}Rankings from AP Poll. (#) Tournament seedings in parentheses. MW=Midwest. All times are in Central Time.
