= 1981–82 Evansville Purple Aces men's basketball team =

American college basketball season

1981–82 Evansville Purple Aces men's basketball

MCC Regular season champions MCC tournament champions

1982 NCAA tournament, second round
- Conference: Midwestern City Conference
- Record: 23–6 (10–2 MCC)
- Head coach: Dick Walters
- Home arena: Roberts Municipal Stadium

1981–82 Midwestern City Conference men's basketball standings
	Conf.				Overall
Team	W		L	PCT	W		L	PCT
Evansville †	10	–	2	.833	23	–	6	.793
Oral Roberts	8	–	4	.667	18	–	12	.600
Loyola-Chicago	8	–	4	.667	17	–	12	.586
Oklahoma City	6	–	6	.500	14	–	14	.500
Detroit	6	–	6	.500	10	–	17	.370
Butler	3	–	9	.250	7	–	20	.259
Xavier	1	–	11	.083	8	–	20	.286
† 1982 MCC tournament winner

The 1981–82 Evansville Purple Aces men's basketball team represented the University of Evansville during the 1981–82 NCAA Division I men's basketball season. Their head coach was Dick Walters and they played their home games at the Roberts Municipal Stadium (Evansville)as members of the Midwestern City Conference. After winning the MCC regular season championship by two games, the Purple Aces won the MCC tournament to receive an automatic bid to the 1982 NCAA tournament. They were defeated by Marquette in the opening round.

== Roster ==
1981–82 Evansville Purple Aces men's basketball team
Players
Coaches

Pos.	#	Name	Height	Weight	Year	Hometown
G		Brad Leaf	6 ft 5 in (1.96 m)	195 lb (88 kg)	Sr	Indianapolis, IN
C		Richie Johnson	6 ft 9 in (2.06 m)	225 lb (102 kg)	So	Albany, Indiana
F		Theren Bullock	6 ft 6 in (1.98 m)	—	Sr
G		Eric Harris	6 ft 1 in (1.85 m)	—	Sr
C		Emir Turam	7 ft 1 in (2.16 m)	—	So
C		Kenny Perry	6 ft 11 in (2.11 m)	225 lb (102 kg)	So	Rockport, Indiana
F		Rick McKinstry	6 ft 6 in (1.98 m)	—	So
G		Murray Lendy	6 ft 3 in (1.91 m)	—	Jr
G		Jeff Embrey	5 ft 10 in (1.78 m)	—	Fr
C		Steve Sherwood	6 ft 8 in (2.03 m)	—	Sr
F		David Bennett	6 ft 8 in (2.03 m)	—	Fr
G		Steve Sanders	5 ft 11 in (1.8 m)	—	So
		George Petrakos	—	—
		Lance Furr	—	—

Head coach

- Dick Walters (Illinois State)

Assistant coach(es)

Legend

- (C) Team captain
- (S) Suspended
- (I) Ineligible
- (W) Walk-on
- Injured
- Current redshirt

Roster

== Schedule ==
Date time, TV	Rank^{#}	Opponent^{#}	Result	Record	Site (attendance) city, state
Regular season
Nov 30, 1981*		Baltimore	W 82–51	1–0	Roberts Stadium; Evansville, Indiana
Dec 5, 1981*		at Indiana State	L 58–67	1–1	Hulman Center; Terre Haute, Indiana
Dec 9, 1981*		Southern Illinois	W 82–51	2–1	Roberts Stadium; Evansville, Indiana
Dec 12, 1981*		Western Kentucky	W 73–70	3–1	Roberts Stadium; Evansville, Indiana
Dec 14, 1981*		at Valparaiso	W 78–56	4–1	Hilltop Gym; Valparaiso, Indiana
Dec 18, 1981*		vs. Cal State Fullerton	W 62–51	5–1	Titan Gym; Fullerton, California
Dec 19, 1981*		at Pepperdine	W 77–69	6–1	Firestone Fieldhouse; Malibu, California
Dec 22, 1981*		at Austin Peay	W 72–54	7–1	Dunn Center; Clarksville, Tennessee
Dec 29, 1981*		Tennessee Tech	W 67–43	8–1	Roberts Stadium; Evansville, Indiana
Dec 30, 1981*		Murray State	W 77–58	9–1	Roberts Stadium; Evansville, Indiana
Jan 2, 1982*		Missouri–St. Louis	W 86–47	10–1	Roberts Stadium; Evansville, Indiana
Jan 6, 1982*		at Kansas	L 65–72 ^{OT}	10–2	Allen Fieldhouse; Lawrence, Kansas
Jan 9, 1982		Xavier	W 82–52	11–2 (1–0)	Roberts Stadium; Evansville, Indiana
Jan 16, 1982		at Oral Roberts	W 63–62	12–2 (2–0)	Mabee Center; Tulsa, Oklahoma
Jan 18, 1982		at Oklahoma City	L 54–75	12–3 (2–1)	Frederickson Fieldhouse; Oklahoma City, Oklahoma
Jan 23, 1982		Loyola–Chicago	W 84–80	13–3 (3–1)	Roberts Stadium; Evansville, Indiana
Jan 25, 1982		at Detroit	W 86–69	14–3 (4–1)	Calihan Hall; Detroit, Michigan
Jan 30, 1982		at Butler	W 80–47	15–3 (5–1)	Hinkle Fieldhouse; Indianapolis, Indiana
Feb 1, 1982		Valparaiso	W 80–66	16–3	Roberts Stadium; Evansville, Indiana
Feb 6, 1982		at Xavier	W 76–73	17–3 (6–1)	Schmidt Fieldhouse; Cincinnati, Ohio
Feb 10, 1982*		at No. 3 DePaul	L 58–59	17–4	Rosemont Horizon (13,137); Rosemont, Illinois
Feb 13, 1982		Oral Roberts	W 71–47	18–4 (7–1)	Roberts Stadium; Evansville, Indiana
Feb 15, 1982		Oklahoma City	W 45–41	19–4 (8–1)	Roberts Stadium; Evansville, Indiana
Feb 20, 1982		at Loyola–Chicago	W 79–73	20–4 (9–1)	Alumni Gym; Chicago, Illinois
Feb 22, 1982*		Detroit	L 65–69	20–5 (9–2)	Roberts Stadium; Evansville, Indiana
Feb 27, 1982		Butler	W 68–58	21–5 (10–2)	Roberts Stadium; Evansville, Indiana
MCC tournament
Mar 3, 1982*	(1)	vs. (4) Oklahoma City; Quarterfinals	W 57–45	22–5	Mabee Center; Tulsa, Oklahoma
Mar 4, 1982*	(1)	vs. (3) Loyola–Chicago; Championship game	W 81–72	23–5	Mabee Center; Tulsa, Oklahoma
NCAA tournament
Mar 11, 1982*	(10 MW)	vs. (7 MW) Marquette; First round	L 62–67	23–6	Mabee Center (8,680); Tulsa, Oklahoma
*Non-conference game. ^{#}Rankings from AP Poll. (#) Tournament seedings in parentheses. All times are in Central Standard Time.
