= Larry Farmer (basketball) =

American basketball player and coach

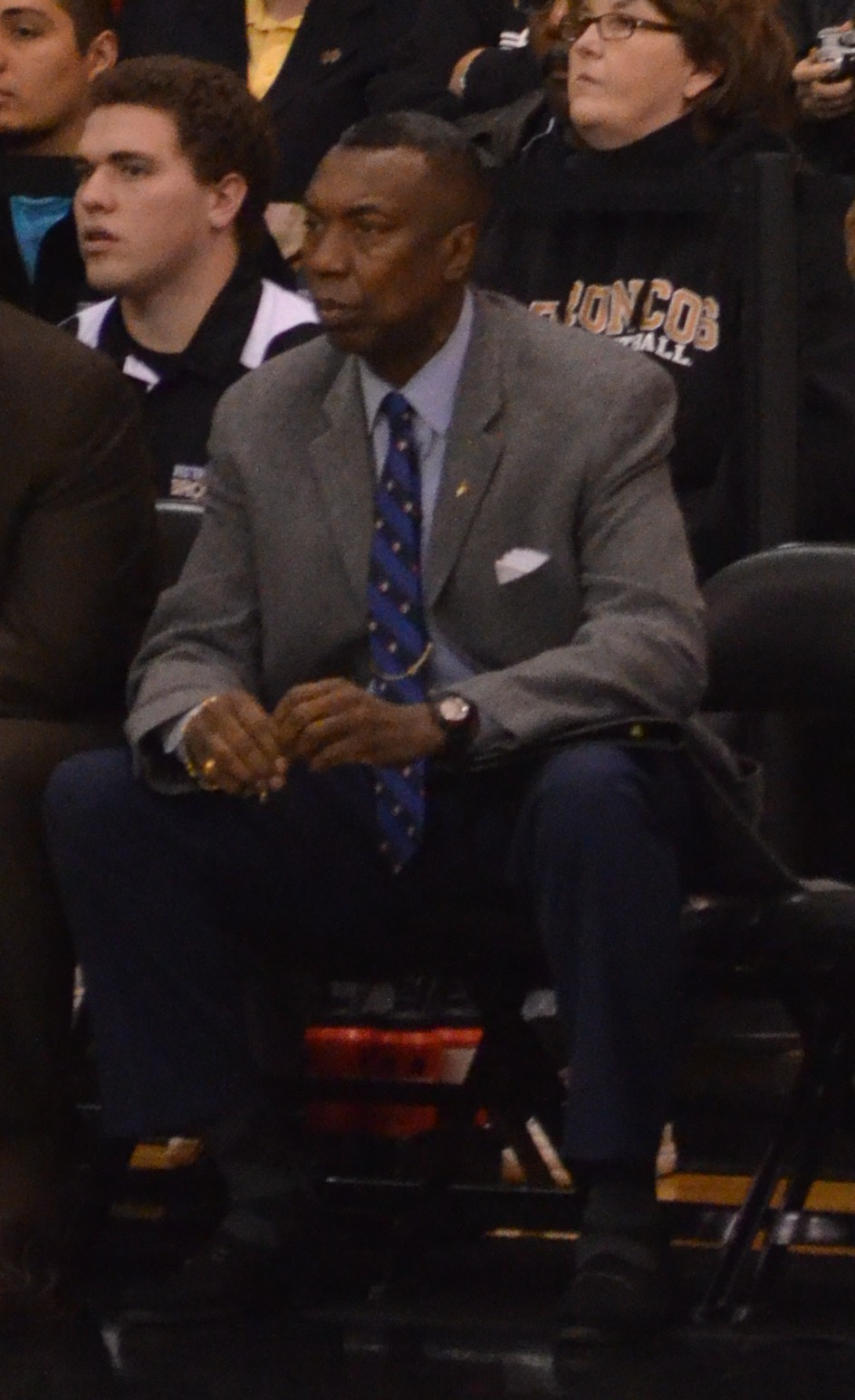
- Farmer as an assistant coach for Western Michigan in 2011

Biographical details
- Born: January 31, 1951 (age 75)

Playing career
- 1970–1973: UCLA

Coaching career (HC unless noted)
- 1973–1981: UCLA (assistant)
- 1981–1984: UCLA
- 1985–1988: Weber State
- 1988–1990: Qadsia Sporting Club
- 1990–1991: Golden State Warriors (assistant)
- 1992–1997: Kuwait national team
- 1997–1998: Rhode Island (assistant)
- 1998–2004: Loyola (IL)
- 2007–2010: Hawaii (assistant)
- 2010–2012: Western Michigan (assistant)
- 2013–2018: Western Michigan (assistant)
- 2022–present: Woodlands

Administrative career (AD unless noted)
- 2012–2013: NC State (dir. player dev.)

Head coaching record
- Overall: 166–179 (college)
- Tournaments: 0–1 (NCAA Division I)

Accomplishments and honors

Championships
- As player: 3× NCAA champion (1971–1973); As head coach: Pac-10 champion (1983); As assistant coach: NCAA champion (1975)

Larry Farmer (born January 31, 1951) is an American basketball coach and former player. Farmer served as the head basketball coach at the University of California, Los Angeles (UCLA) from 1981 to 1984, Weber State University from 1985 to 1988, and Loyola University Chicago from 1998 to 2004. He played college basketball at UCLA, where he was a member of three national championships-winning teams for the UCLA Bruins under head coach John Wooden in the early 1970s. In 2018, Farmer was inducted into the UCLA Athletics Hall of Fame.

== High school career ==
Farmer played high school basketball at Manual High School in Denver, Colorado, from 1966 to 1969. He nearly quit the sport as a sophomore, but as a senior he helped the Thunderbolts reach the state championship game and was named First Team Denver Post All-State. During his senior campaign he was named First Team All-State, All-Metropolitan and All-City by both the Rocky Mountain News and the Denver Post newspaper.

In January 2017, Farmer was inducted into the Colorado High School Activities Association's Hall of Fame.

== College career ==
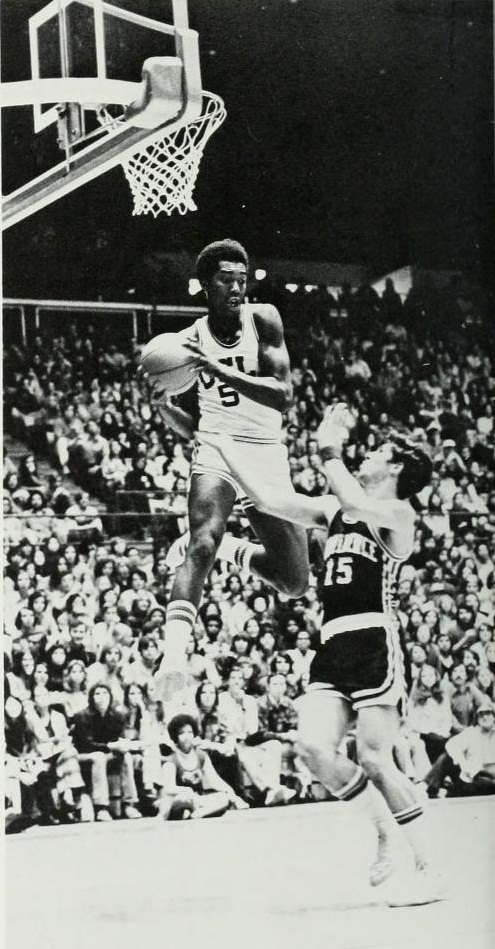
Farmer from 1972 UCLA yearbook

Farmer played at UCLA during the early 1970s under legendary coach John Wooden. He was a teammate of Bill Walton during the era when the Bruins won seven consecutive NCAA men's titles. He was the only player that participated in all the games for the UCLA teams that went 89–1 (.989), the best winning percentage in NCAA men's basketball history.

== Coaching career ==
Farmer was drafted by both the Cleveland Cavaliers of the National Basketball Association (NBA) and Denver Nuggets of the American Basketball Association (ABA). He did not play, but instead returned to UCLA to where he was an assistant basketball coach under Wooden, Gene Bartow, Gary Cunningham and Larry Brown from 1973 to 1981. His stint was interrupted in 1974–75, when Farmer played professionally for ADB Koblenz in the German Basketball Bundesliga. When Brown resigned prior to the 1981–82 season, Farmer was elevated to head coach of the UCLA basketball team.

While Farmer was an assistant at UCLA under Brown in 1979, he made a TV appearance in The White Shadow and a movie appearance in Fast Break as player named Benton.

=== UCLA head basketball coach ===
Farmer was the head coach of the University of California, Los Angeles from 1981 to 1984, guiding them to a 61–23 (.726) record.

=== Weber State basketball coach ===
In 1985, Farmer became the head coach for Weber State University and was the successor to Neil McCarthy. Farmer coached Weber for three seasons (1985–88) and compiled a record of 34–54 (.386).

=== Loyola (Chicago) head basketball coach ===
Farmer coached at Loyola University Chicago from 1998 to 2004. Farmer had a 30–51 (.370) record over his first three seasons before finally breaking through in 2001. In that year, Farmer compiled a 17–13 record, 9–7 in the Horizon League. Farmer took the Ramblers to the brink of the NCAA Tournament before losing to rival University of Illinois Chicago. For his efforts, Farmer was lauded with Horizon League Coach of the Year honors by CollegeInsider.com. Loyola under Farmer was the only team to defeat each of the top three teams in the Horizon League in 2001–02 (Butler, Detroit and Wisconsin-Milwaukee). During the 2001 season, Farmer got the Ramblers off to a 6–0 Horizon League start, the best in school history.

=== Other coaching jobs ===
Farmer has also coached at the professional level serving as head coach of the Qadsia Sporting Club in Kuwait (1988–90) and as an assistant with the NBA's Golden State Warriors (1990–91). He also served as a coach for the Kuwaiti National Team from 1992–97.

His college coaching experience also includes a stint as an assistant at Rhode Island (1997–98), where he helped the Rams reach the Elite Eight.

He spent three years on the bench at the University of Hawaiʻi under Bob Nash from 2007–10.

Farmer spent two seasons as an assistant coach at Western Michigan from 2010–12.

In the 2012 season, Farmer was the director of player development for men's basketball at North Carolina State. Farmer and NC State head coach Mark Gottfried were both UCLA assistant coaches.

He returned to the WMU staff for the 2013 season and retired after the 2017–18 season.

== Head coaching record ==
Record table
Season	Team	Overall	Conference	Standing	Postseason
UCLA Bruins (Pacific-10 Conference) (1981–1984)
1981–82	UCLA	21–6	14–4	2nd	
1982–83	UCLA	23–6	15–3	1st	NCAA Division I Second Round
1983–84	UCLA	17–11	10–8	4th	
UCLA:		61–23 (.726)	39–15 (.722)		
Weber State Wildcats (Big Sky Conference) (1985–1988)
1985–86	Weber State	18–11	7–7	T–4th	
1986–87	Weber State	7–22	4–10	8th	
1987–88	Weber State	9–21	6–10	8th	
Weber State:		34–54 (.386)	17–27 (.386)		
Loyola Chicago Ramblers (Horizon League) (1998–2004)
1998–99	Loyola Chicago	9–18	7–7	4th	
1999–00	Loyola Chicago	14–14	4–10	8th	
2000–01	Loyola Chicago	7–21	2–12	8th	
2001–02	Loyola Chicago	17–13	9–7	T–4th	
2002–03	Loyola Chicago	15–16	9–7	T–4th	
2003–04	Loyola Chicago	9–20	4–12	T–7th	
Loyola Chicago:		71–102 (.410)	35–55 (.389)		
Total:		166–179 (.481)			
National champion Postseason invitational champion Conference regular season champion Conference regular season and conference tournament champion Division regular season champion Division regular season and conference tournament champion Conference tournament champion
