= 1981–82 Notre Dame Fighting Irish men's basketball team =

NCAA Division I basketball team

1981–82 Notre Dame Fighting Irish men's basketball
- Conference: Independent
- Record: 10–17
- Head coach: Digger Phelps (11th season)
- Assistant coach: Pete Gillen (2nd season)
- Captain: Mike Mitchell
- Home arena: Joyce Center

1981–82 NCAA Division I men's basketball independents standings
	Conf.				Overall
Team	W		L	PCT	W		L	PCT
No. 2 DePaul		–		–	26	–	2	.929
Marquette		–		–	23	–	9	.719
Dayton		–		–	21	–	9	.700
New Orleans		–		–	18	–	8	.692
UNLV		–		–	20	–	10	.667
Cleveland State		–		–	17	–	10	.630
Southeastern Louisiana		–		–	16	–	11	.593
Southern Mississippi		–		–	15	–	11	.577
Penn State		–		–	15	–	12	.556
Tennessee State		–		–	13	–	12	.520
Eastern Illinois		–		–	14	–	13	.519
Green Bay		–		–	14	–	13	.519
Illinois-Chicago		–		–	14	–	13	.519
Western Illinois		–		–	14	–	13	.519
Charleston Southern		–		–	13	–	13	.500
South Carolina		–		–	14	–	15	.483
UNC Wilmington		–		–	13	–	14	.481
Northern Iowa		–		–	12	–	15	.444
Stetson		–		–	12	–	15	.444
Campbell		–		–	11	–	16	.407
Notre Dame		–		–	10	–	17	.370
U.S. International		–		–	9	–	18	.333
Valparaiso		–		–	9	–	18	.333
Texas-San Antonio		–		–	8	–	19	.296
Nicholls State		–		–	6	–	20	.231
Texas-Rio Grande Valley		–		–	5	–	20	.200
Utica		–		–	4	–	22	.154
Georgia State		–		–	4	–	23	.148
As of Rankings from AP Poll

The 1981–82 Notre Dame Fighting Irish men's basketball team represented the University of Notre Dame during the 1981–82 NCAA Division I men's basketball season. The team was coached by Digger Phelps. The Fighting Irish finished the regular season with a record of 10–17.

Guard Mike Mitchell was the team's captain and leading scorer, averaging 6.4 points per game.

== Roster ==
1981–82 Notre Dame Fighting Irish men's basketball team
Players
Coaches

Pos.	#	Name	Height	Weight	Year	Hometown
C	53	Tim Andree	6 ft 10 in (2.08 m)	230 lb (104 kg)	Jr	Farmington, Michigan
G	53	Dan Duff	6 ft 0 in (1.83 m)	180 lb (82 kg)	Fr	Lincoln, Illinois
F	21	Gary Grassey	6 ft 8 in (2.03 m)	220 lb (100 kg)	Sr	Hackettstown, New Jersey
G	25	Marc Kelly	5 ft 10 in (1.78 m)	160 lb (73 kg)	Sr	La Crescenta, California
G	31	Karl Love	6 ft 4 in (1.93 m)	180 lb (82 kg)	Jr	Columbia, Maryland
G	15	Mike Mitchell	6 ft 2 in (1.88 m)	175 lb (79 kg)	Sr	San Bruno, California
G	23	John Paxson	6 ft 2 in (1.88 m)	180 lb (82 kg)	Jr	Kettering, Ohio
G	24	Ron Rowan	6 ft 5 in (1.96 m)	185 lb (84 kg)	Fr	Beaver Falls, Pennsylvania
F	43	Cecil Rucker	6 ft 8 in (2.03 m)	190 lb (86 kg)	So	Washington, DC
G	33	Tom Sluby	6 ft 4 in (1.93 m)	200 lb (91 kg)	So	Washington, DC
G	13	Barry Spencer	6 ft 7 in (2.01 m)	195 lb (88 kg)	So	Detroit, Michigan
F	34	Bill Varner	6 ft 6 in (1.98 m)	200 lb (91 kg)	Jr	New Kensington, Pennsylvania

Head coach

- Digger Phelps

Assistant coach(es)

- Pete Gillen

Legend

- (C) Team captain
- (S) Suspended
- (I) Ineligible
- (W) Walk-on
- Injured
- Current redshirt

== Schedule ==
Date time, TV	Rank^{#}	Opponent^{#}	Result	Record	Site city, state
November 28		St. Joseph (IN)	W 82–52	1–0	Joyce Center; Notre Dame, IN
December 1		at No. 12 Indiana	L 55–69	1–1	Assembly Hall; Bloomington, Indiana
December 5		No. 8 UCLA	L 49–75	1–2	Joyce Center (11,345); Notre Dame, IN
December 7		Murray State	L 54–56	1–3	Joyce Center; Notre Dame, IN
December 12		Northern Illinois	L 65–70	1–4	Joyce Center; Notre Dame, IN
December 22		Valparaiso	W 75–60	2–4	Joyce Center; Notre Dame, IN
December 29		at No. 4 Kentucky	L 28–34 ^{OT}	2–5	Freedom Hall; Louisville, Kentucky
January 2		at No. 7 Missouri	L 70–92	2–6	Kemper Arena; Kansas City, Missouri
January 4		at La Salle	L 61–66	2–7	Palestra; Philadelphia, Pennsylvania
January 6		vs. No. 2 Virginia	L 54–87	2–8	Capital Centre (17,422); Landover, Maryland
January 12		vs. No. 7 San Francisco	L 55–57	2–9	Oakland Coliseum; Oakland, California
January 16		Davidson	W 59–45	3–9	Joyce Center; Notre Dame, IN
January 19		Villanova	L 46–48	3–10	Joyce Center; Notre Dame, IN
January 23		Maryland	W 55–51	4–10	Joyce Center; Notre Dame, IN
January 25; 8:00 pm, USA		No. 11 Idaho	W 50–48 ^{OT}	5–10	Joyce Center (11,345); Notre Dame, IN
January 27		Maine	W 79–55	6–10	Joyce Center; Notre Dame, IN
January 30		Marquette	L 62–70	6–11	Joyce Center (11,345); Notre Dame, IN
February 2		No. 7 San Francisco	W 75–66	7–11	Joyce Center; Notre Dame, IN
February 7		at UCLA	L 47–48	7–12	Pauley Pavilion (10,244); Los Angeles, California
February 13		North Carolina State	L 42–62	7–13	Joyce Center; Notre Dame, IN
February 18		vs. Seton Hall	L 58–71	7–14	Izod Center; East Rutherford, NJ
February 20		at South Carolina	W 59–55	8–14	Carolina Coliseum; Columbia, SC
February 23		Fordham	L 50–65	8–15	Joyce Center; Notre Dame, IN
February 27		No. 3 DePaul	L 69–81	8–16	Joyce Center (11,345); Notre Dame, IN
March 2		Northern Iowa	W 86–56	9–16	Joyce Center; Notre Dame, IN
March 6		at Dayton	W 86–56	9–17	University of Dayton Arena; Dayton, Ohio
March 7		vs. Michigan	W 53–52	10–17	Silverdome; Pontiac, Michigan
*Non-conference game. ^{#}Rankings from AP Poll. (#) Tournament seedings in parentheses. All times are in Eastern Time.

== Players selected in NBA drafts ==
Year	Round	Pick	Player	NBA club
1983	1	19	John Paxson	San Antonio Spurs
1983	5	98	Tim Andree	Chicago Bulls
1983	9	202	Bill Varner	Milwaukee Bucks
1984	2	41	Tom Sluby	Dallas Mavericks
