= 1981–82 Washington Huskies men's basketball team =

American college basketball season

1981–82 Washington Huskies men's basketball

National Invitation Tournament, Second round
- Conference: Pacific-10 Conference
- Record: 19–10 (11–7 Pac-10)
- Head coach: Marv Harshman (11th season)
- Assistant coach: Bob Johnson
- Home arena: Hec Edmundson Pavilion

1981–82 Pacific-10 Conference men's basketball standings
	Conf.				Overall
Team	W		L	PCT	W		L	PCT
No. 4 Oregon State	16	–	2	.889	25	–	5	.833
No. 19 UCLA	14	–	4	.778	21	–	6	.778
USC	13	–	5	.722	19	–	9	.679
Washington	11	–	7	.611	19	–	10	.655
Washington State	10	–	8	.556	16	–	14	.533
California	8	–	10	.444	14	–	13	.519
Arizona State	8	–	10	.444	13	–	14	.481
Oregon	4	–	14	.222	9	–	18	.333
Arizona	4	–	14	.222	9	–	18	.333
Stanford	2	–	16	.111	7	–	20	.259
As of April 15, 1982; Rankings from AP Poll

The 1981–82 Washington Huskies men's basketball team represented the University of Washington for the 1981–82 NCAA Division I men's basketball season. Led by eleventh-year head coach Marv Harshman, the Huskies were members of the Pacific-10 Conference and played their home games on campus at Hec Edmundson Pavilion in Seattle, Washington.

The Huskies were 18–9 overall in the regular season and 11–7 in conference play, fourth in the standings. The Huskies dropped their last five games of the regular season. There was no conference tournament yet; it debuted five years later.

Washington played in the National Invitation Tournament and defeated BYU in the first round by three points in Provo, Utah. In the second round in Seattle, the Huskies lost by four points to Texas A&M.

== Roster ==
1981–82 Washington Huskies men's basketball team
Players
Coaches

Pos.	#	Name	Height	Weight	Year	Hometown
G	24	Steve Burks	6 ft 3 in (1.91 m)	190 lb (86 kg)	Sr	Kansas City, Missouri
F	30	Dan Caldwell	6 ft 8 in (2.03 m)	210 lb (95 kg)	Sr	Seattle, Washington
F	34	Alan Fields	6 ft 3 in (1.91 m)	185 lb (84 kg)	Fr	Yorktown, Indiana
F	22	Steve Jackson	6 ft 5 in (1.96 m)	195 lb (88 kg)	Jr	Kirkland, Washington
G	15	David Koehler	6 ft 0 in (1.83 m)	170 lb (77 kg)	So	Corona Del Mar, CA
C	35	Kenny Lyles	6 ft 7 in (2.01 m)	210 lb (95 kg)	Sr	Seattle, Washington
F	31	Detlef Schrempf	6 ft 8 in (2.03 m)	190 lb (86 kg)	Fr	Leverkusen
F	21	Brad Watson	6 ft 6 in (1.98 m)	195 lb (88 kg)	Jr	Seattle, Washington
G	32	Shag Williams	6 ft 3 in (1.91 m)	190 lb (86 kg)	Fr	Yakima, Washington

Head coach

- Marv Harshman

Assistant coach(es)

Legend

- (C) Team captain
- (S) Suspended
- (I) Ineligible
- (W) Walk-on
- Injured
- Current redshirt

== Postseason results ==
Date time, TV	Opponent	Result	Record	Site (attendance) city, state
National Invitation Tournament
Wed, March 10*; 6:30 pm	at BYU; First round	W 66–63	19–9	Marriott Center (15,689); Provo, Utah
Mon, March 15*	Texas A&M; Second round	L 65–69	19–10	Hec Edmundson Pavilion (6,123); Seattle, Washington
*Non-conference game. ^{#}Rankings from AP poll. (#) Tournament seedings in parentheses. All times are in Pacific time.
