= Dana Kirk (basketball) =

American basketball coach (1935–2010)

Biographical details
- Born: July 23, 1935; Logan, West Virginia, U.S.
- Died: February 15, 2010 (aged 74); Memphis, Tennessee, U.S.

Playing career

Basketball
- 1954–1957: Morris Harvey

Football
- 1954–1956: Morris Harvey
- 1957: Marshall
- Positions: Forward, End

Coaching career (HC unless noted)
- 1966–1971: Tampa
- 1971–1976: Louisville (assistant)
- 1976–1979: VCU
- 1979–1986: Memphis

Head coaching record
- Overall: 283–140
- Tournaments: 9–5 (NCAA Division I); 0–1 (NIT)

Accomplishments and honors

Championships
- NCAA Division I Regional – Final Four (1985*); 3 Metro Conference regular season (1982, 1984, 1985); 3 Metro Conference tournament (1982, 1984, 1985) * Vacated by the NCAA

Dana Grey Kirk (July 23, 1935 – February 15, 2010) was an American college basketball coach. He was the head coach for the Memphis State University (now the University of Memphis) men's team from 1979 to 1986. His coaching record was 158–58, including a Final Four appearance in 1985. He had previously been the head coach at Virginia Commonwealth University from 1976 to 1979 with a record of 57–23 and the University of Tampa from 1966 to 1971, with a record of 68–59, (.535). Following his stint at Tampa, he was an assistant coach for Denny Crum at the University of Louisville.

== Early life ==
Kirk attended Burch High School in Delbarton, West Virginia where he played football and basketball. He would play both sports at Morris Harvey College (now the University of Charleston) before transferring to Marshall University to play on the Thundering Herd football team.

== Memphis State ==
Kirk built the Tigers into a national powerhouse with teams built around Memphis-area players. However, he only graduated six out of 60 scholarship players in seven years, including only two on the celebrated 1985 team. Only a year after the Final Four appearance, it was revealed that Memphis State had committed many severe recruiting violations while Kirk was head coach. In addition, Kirk himself was arrested on felony charges following an investigation.

=== Indictment ===
In 1986, the NCAA forced Memphis State to vacate all of their NCAA tournament appearances from 1982 through 1985, including its Final Four run. Kirk was indicted by a federal grand jury on 11 counts of tax evasion, filing false income tax returns, mail fraud and obstruction of justice. At his trial, witnesses testified that he scalped tickets for as much as five times face value, took money from boosters to give to players and actively solicited kickbacks from tournament promoters. He served four months in a federal minimum-security prison in Montgomery, Alabama. After serving out his sentence, he returned to Memphis where he hosted a sports talk show on WHBQ. He has also published his autobiography Simply Amazing, The Dana Kirk Story, written with Dallas talk show host and columnist Mark Davis, who was at WHBQ at the time.

== Retirement ==
He retired and lived in Memphis, Tennessee with his wife Denise McCrary, a successful attorney. If asked about any of the happenings surrounding his Memphis State years, he would only respond "I don't do negativity". Dana Kirk died of a heart attack at Methodist University Hospital in Memphis on February 15, 2010.

== Head coaching record ==
Record table
| Season | Team | Overall | Conference | Standing | Postseason |
|---|---|---|---|---|---|
Tampa Spartans (Independent) (1966–1971)
| 1966–67 | Tampa | 12–14 | | | |
| 1967–68 | Tampa | 15–9 | | | |
| 1968–69 | Tampa | 15–10 | | | |
| 1969–70 | Tampa | 18–9 | | | |
| 1970–71 | Tampa | 8–17 | | | |
| Tampa: | | 68–59 | | | |
VCU Rams (NCAA Division I independent) (1976–1979)
| 1976–77 | VCU | 13–13 | | | |
| 1977–78 | VCU | 24–5 | | | NIT First Round |
| 1978–79 | VCU | 20–5 | | | |
| VCU: | | 57–23 | | | |
Memphis State Tigers (Metro Conference) (1979–1985)
| 1979–80 | Memphis State | 13–14 | 5–7 | 4th | |
| 1980–81 | Memphis State | 13–14 | 5–7 | 5th | |
| 1981–82 | Memphis State | 24–5^^ | 10–2 | 1st | NCAA Division I Sweet 16^^ |
| 1982–83 | Memphis State | 23–8^^ | 6–6 | 4th | NCAA Division I Sweet 16^^ |
| 1983–84 | Memphis State | 26–7^^ | 11–3 | T–1st | NCAA Division I Sweet 16^^ |
| 1984–85 | Memphis State | 31–4^^ | 13–1 | 1st | NCAA Division I Final Four^^ |
| 1985–86 | Memphis State | 28–6^^ | 9–3 | 2nd | NCAA Division I Second Round^^ |
| Memphis State: | | 158–58& | 59–29 | | |
| Total: | | 283–140 | | | |
National champion Postseason invitational champion Conference regular season champion Conference regular season and conference tournament champion Division regular season champion Division regular season and conference tournament champion Conference tournament champion

^^Memphis State was forced to vacate its 1982, 1983, 1984, 1985 and 1986 NCAA Tournament appearances, as well as its third-place standing in the 1985 tournament, due to recruiting violations. Official records are 23–4 for 1981–82, 22–7 for 1982–83, 24–6 for 1983–84, 27–3 for 1984–85 and 27–5 for 1985–86.
&Record at Memphis State is 149–53 without vacated games.

== See also ==
- List of NCAA Division I Men's Final Four appearances by coach
