= 1981–82 Memphis State Tigers men's basketball team =

American college basketball season

1981–82 Memphis State Tigers men's basketball

Metro Conference tournament champions Metro Conference regular season champions

NCAA tournament, Sweet Sixteen (vacated)
- Conference: Metro Conference (1975–1995)

Ranking
- Coaches: No. 9
- AP: No. 9
- Record: 23–4 (24-5 unadjusted) (10–2 Metro)
- Head coach: Dana Kirk (3rd season)
- Assistant coaches: Larry Finch (2nd season); Lee Fowler
- Home arena: Mid-South Coliseum

1981–82 Metro Conference men's basketball standings
| | Conf. | | | | Overall |
| Team | W | | L | PCT | W | | L | PCT |
|---|---|---|---|---|---|---|---|---|
| No. 9 Memphis State † | 10 | – | 2 | .833 | 23 | – | 4 | .852 |
| No. 20 Louisville | 8 | – | 4 | .667 | 23 | – | 10 | .697 |
| Tulane | 8 | – | 4 | .667 | 19 | – | 9 | .679 |
| Virginia Tech | 7 | – | 5 | .583 | 20 | – | 11 | .645 |
| Cincinnati | 4 | – | 8 | .333 | 15 | – | 12 | .556 |
| Florida State | 4 | – | 8 | .333 | 11 | – | 17 | .393 |
| Saint Louis | 1 | – | 11 | .083 | 6 | – | 21 | .222 |
† 1982 Metro Conference tournament winner Rankings from AP Poll; *Memphis State vacated NCAA Tournament games due to NCAA sanctions. Disputed record (24–5)

The 1981–82 Memphis State Tigers men's basketball team represented Memphis State University as a member of the Metro Conference during the 1981–82 NCAA Division I men's basketball season.

The Tigers won Metro Conference regular season and conference tournament titles to receive an automatic bid to the 1982 NCAA tournament. As No. 2 seed in the East region, Memphis State beat No. 7 seed Wake Forest to reach the Sweet Sixteen for the first of three straight seasons. The Villanova Wildcats defeated Memphis State, 70–66, in the regional semifinal. The Tigers finished with a 24–5 record (10–2 Metro), though the NCAA tournament results would later be vacated.

== Roster ==
1981–82 Memphis State Tigers men's basketball team
Players
Coaches

| Pos. | # | Name | Height | Weight | Year | Hometown |
|---|---|---|---|---|---|---|
| G | 11 | Ricky McCoy | 6 ft 2 in (1.88 m) | 180 lb (82 kg) | Fr | Memphis, Tennessee |
| F | 22 | Bobby Parks | 6 ft 5 in (1.96 m) | 185 lb (84 kg) | So | Grand Junction, Tennessee |
| F | 24 | Keith Lee | 6 ft 10 in (2.08 m) | 220 lb (100 kg) | Fr | West Memphis, Arkansas |
| G | 32 | Phillip Haynes | 6 ft 3 in (1.91 m) | 185 lb (84 kg) | So | Memphis, Tennessee |
| F | 45 | Willie Becton | 6 ft 5 in (1.96 m) | 215 lb (98 kg) | Fr | Memphis, Tennessee |

Head coach

- Dana Kirk

Assistant coach(es)

- Larry Finch (Memphis)
- Lee Fowler (Vanderbilt)

Legend

- (C) Team captain
- (S) Suspended
- (I) Ineligible
- (W) Walk-on
- Injured
- Current redshirt

Roster

== Schedule and results ==
| Date time, TV | Rank^{#} | Opponent^{#} | Result | Record | Site city, state |
Regular season
| Dec 1, 1981* | | at East Tennessee State | L 62–67 | 0–1 | Memorial Center; Johnson City, Tennessee |
| Dec 5, 1981* | | West Alabama | W 60–40 | 1–1 | Mid-South Coliseum; Memphis, Tennessee |
| Dec 7, 1981* | | at Mississippi State | L 47–48 | 1–2 | Humphrey Coliseum; Starkville, Mississippi |
| Dec 12, 1981* | | Indiana State | W 101–89 | 2–2 | Mid-South Coliseum; Memphis, Tennessee |
| Dec 19, 1981* | | No. 15 Southwestern Louisiana | W 82–70 | 3–2 | Mid-South Coliseum; Memphis, Tennessee |
| Dec 22, 1981* | | Brown | W 106–96 | 4–2 | Mid-South Coliseum; Memphis, Tennessee |
| Dec 29, 1981* | | Ole Miss | W 61–55 | 5–2 | Mid-South Coliseum; Memphis, Tennessee |
| Jan 27, 1982* | | Marquette | W 77–70 | 13–3 | Mid-South Coliseum (11,200); Memphis, Tennessee |
| Feb 20, 1982* | No. 12 | at Penn State | W 52–46 | 19–3 | Rec Hall; University Park, Pennsylvania |
| Feb 22, 1982 | No. 10 | at Louisville | L 61–65 | 19–4 (8–2) | Freedom Hall; Louisville, Kentucky |
| Feb 25, 1982 | No. 10 | Tulane | W 64–62 | 20–4 (9–2) | Mid-South Coliseum; Memphis, Tennessee |
| Feb 27, 1982 | No. 10 | Saint Louis | W 94–72 | 21–4 (10–2) | Mid-South Coliseum; Memphis, Tennessee |
Metro Conference tournament
| Mar 5, 1982* | No. 13 | Virginia Tech; Semifinals | W 71–70 | 22–4 | Mid-South Coliseum; Memphis, Tennessee |
| Mar 6, 1982* | No. 13 | Louisville; Championship game | W 73–62 | 23–4 | Mid-South Coliseum; Memphis, Tennessee |
NCAA Tournament
| Mar 13, 1982* | (2 E) No. 9 | vs. (7 E) No. 18 Wake Forest; Second round | W 56–55 | 24–4 | Charlotte Coliseum; Charlotte, North Carolina |
| Mar 19, 1982* | (2 E) No. 9 | vs. (3 E) Villanova; East Regional semifinal – Sweet Sixteen | L 66–70 ^{OT} | 24–5 | Reynolds Coliseum; Raleigh, North Carolina |
*Non-conference game. ^{#}Rankings from AP Poll. (#) Tournament seedings in parentheses. MW=Midwest region. All times are in Eastern Time.

== Rankings ==
Ranking movements Legend: ██ Increase in ranking ██ Decrease in ranking — = Not ranked
| | Week | | | | | | | | | | | | | | | |
| Poll | Pre | 1 | 2 | 3 | 4 | 5 | 6 | 7 | 8 | 9 | 10 | 11 | 12 | 13 | 14 | Final |
|---|---|---|---|---|---|---|---|---|---|---|---|---|---|---|---|---|
| AP | — | — | — | — | — | — | — | — | — | — | 20 | 14 | 12 | 10 | 13 | 9 |
| Coaches | Not released | | — | — | — | — | — | — | — | — | — | 18 | 13 | 13 | 11 | 9 |
