= Syracuse–UConn rivalry =

American college sports rivalry

- Syracuse Orange UConn Huskies

Locations of Syracuse and UConn

The Syracuse–UConn rivalry is a sports rivalry between the Syracuse Orange of Syracuse University and the UConn Huskies of the University of Connecticut. The rivalry started in men's basketball while both schools were members of the Big East conference, and slowly grew across other sports.

College Comparison
	Syracuse	UConn
Founded	1870	1881
Type	Private	Public
Conference	ACC	Big East
Students	21,772	32,669
School colors		
Nickname	Orange	Huskies

== Men's basketball ==
Syracuse–UConn men's basketball rivalry
- Syracuse Orange UConn Huskies
- Sport: Basketball
- First meeting: January 27, 1956
- Latest meeting: November 15, 2018

Statistics
- Total meetings: 95
- All-time series: Syracuse leads 56–39
- Largest victory: Syracuse 101–61 (November 30, 1977)
- Longest unbeaten streak: Syracuse 7, (1956–1962)
- Current win streak: UConn 1 (2018–present)

=== History ===
The first game played between the two schools took place on January 27, 1956, in Syracuse, New York. Syracuse won 102–82.

The rivalry peaked while both teams were members of the Big East Conference from 1979 to 2013. The rivalry featured two Hall of Fame coaches, Jim Boeheim and Jim Calhoun.

=== 2009 Big East Tournament ===
One of the highlights was the historic Big East Tournament quarterfinal game in 2009. The game took place at Madison Square Garden in New York City where Syracuse won 127–117 in a game that went to six overtimes, ending at 1:22 AM.

=== Post Big East ===
In November 2015, after the teams met in the Bahamas, both Kevin Ollie and Jim Boeheim expressed interest in renewing the rivalry. Boeheim said, "It was like an NCAA game early in the year, It's a tremendous atmosphere. A tremendous game. It really was. I think there's a reasonable likelihood that we will play Connecticut again someday soon." Ollie said, "It's something that we're definitely looking at, It would be a great thing. It's a great rivalry."

UConn and Syracuse met at the Jimmy V Classic on December 5, 2017 with Syracuse winning 72–63. A year later the teams would meet in the Empire Classic, with UConn winning 83–76. Currently there are no games scheduled between the two schools.

=== Results ===
Connecticut victories	Syracuse victories

No.	Date	Location	Winner	Score
1	January 27, 1956	Syracuse, NY	Syracuse	102–82
2	January 7, 1957	Syracuse, NY	Syracuse	79–78
3	March 12, 1957	New York, NY	Syracuse	82–76
4	March 8, 1958	Syracuse, NY	Syracuse	75–70
5	February 18, 1959	Storrs, CT	Syracuse	72–64
6	February 2, 1960	Syracuse, NY	Syracuse	65–64
7	March 5, 1962	Storrs, CT	Syracuse	72–67
8	March 7, 1963	Syracuse, NY	Connecticut	92–74
9	March 6, 1964	Storrs, CT	Syracuse	58–49
10	December 18, 1965	Syracuse, NY	Syracuse	87–62
11	February 6, 1967	Storrs, CT	Syracuse	90–79
12	January 27, 1968	Syracuse, NY	Connecticut	89–84
13	January 8, 1969	Storrs, CT	Connecticut	103–84
14	February 11, 1970	Syracuse, NY	Syracuse	101–80
15	December 20, 1970	Storrs, CT	Syracuse	97–76
16	February 19, 1972	Syracuse, NY	Syracuse	98–69
17	December 23, 1972	Storrs, CT	Syracuse	104–73
18	January 10, 1974	Syracuse, NY	Connecticut	61–60
19	November 30, 1977	Syracuse, NY	Syracuse	101–61
20	January 13, 1979	New Haven, CT	Syracuse	74–60
21	March 10, 1979	Providence, RI	Syracuse	89–81
22	January 26, 1980	Syracuse, NY	Syracuse	99–89
23	February 29, 1980	Providence, RI	Syracuse	92–61
24	January 5, 1981	New Haven, CT	Connecticut	78–59
25	February 14, 1981	Syracuse, NY	Connecticut	65–63
26	January 6, 1982	Syracuse, NY	Syracuse	72–69
27	February 13, 1982	Hartford, CT	Syracuse	78–71
28	February 2, 1983	Syracuse, NY	Syracuse	89–69
29	February 5, 1983	Hartford, CT	Connecticut	55–54
30	January 18, 1984	Hartford, CT	Syracuse	95–68
31	February 18, 1984	Syracuse, NY	Syracuse	87–85^{3OT}
32	March 8, 1984	Syracuse, NY	Syracuse	73–58
33	January 19, 1985	Syracuse, NY	Connecticut	70–68
34	February 20, 1985	Hartford, CT	Connecticut	71–69
35	January 25, 1986	Syracuse, NY	Syracuse	80–67
36	March 1, 1986	Hartford, CT	Syracuse	75–58
37	January 3, 1987	New Haven, CT	Syracuse	88–71
38	February 7, 1987	Syracuse, NY	Syracuse	59–53
39	January 16, 1988	Syracuse, NY	Connecticut	51–50
40	February 20, 1988	Hartford, CT	Syracuse	73–71
41	January 16, 1989	Hartford, CT	Connecticut	68–62
42	February 28, 1989	Syracuse, NY	Syracuse	88–72
43	January 15, 1990	Hartford, CT	Connecticut	70–59
44	February 10, 1990	Syracuse, NY	Syracuse	90–86
45	March 11, 1990	New York, NY	Connecticut	78–75
46	January 16, 1991	Syracuse, NY	Syracuse	81–79^{OT}
47	January 28, 1991	Hartford, CT	Syracuse	68–66
48	February 3, 1992	Syracuse, NY	Syracuse	84–83

No.	Date	Location	Winner	Score
49	March 4, 1992	Hartford, CT	Connecticut	85–78
50	February 2, 1993	Hartford, CT	Syracuse	60–57
51	February 15, 1993	Syracuse, NY	Connecticut	80–76
52	January 10, 1994	Hartford, CT	Connecticut	75–67
53	February 1, 1994	Syracuse, NY	Syracuse	108–95
54	January 23, 1995	Storrs, CT	Connecticut	86–75
55	February 12, 1995	Syracuse, NY	Connecticut	77–70
56	January 21, 1996	Hartford, CT	Connecticut	79–70
57	March 8, 1996	New York, NY	Connecticut	85–67
58	January 26, 1997	Hartford, CT	Syracuse	65–53
59	February 17, 1997	Syracuse, NY	Syracuse	71–66^{OT}
60	January 24, 1998	Syracuse, NY	Connecticut	63–54
61	March 7, 1998	New York, NY	Connecticut	69–64
62	February 1, 1999	Hartford, CT	Syracuse	59–42
63	February 28, 1999	Syracuse, NY	Connecticut	70–58
64	March 5, 1999	New York, NY	Connecticut	71–50
65	January 24, 2000	Syracuse, NY	Syracuse	88–74
66	March 4, 2000	Hartford, CT	Connecticut	69–54
67	February 19, 2001	Syracuse, NY	Syracuse	65–60
68	March 7, 2001	New York, NY	Syracuse	86–75
69	February 10, 2003	Hartford, CT	Connecticut	75–61
70	March 14, 2003	New York, NY	Connecticut	80–67
71	February 2, 2004	Hartford, CT	Connecticut	84–56
72	March 7, 2004	Syracuse, NY	Syracuse	67–56
73	February 7, 2005	Syracuse, NY	Connecticut	74–66
74	March 5, 2005	Storrs, CT	Connecticut	88–70
75	March 11, 2005	New York, NY	Syracuse	67–63
76	January 16, 2006	Syracuse, NY	Connecticut	88–80
77	February 8, 2006	Hartford, CT	Connecticut	73–50
78	March 9, 2006	New York, NY	Syracuse	86–84^{OT}
79	February 5, 2007	Storrs, CT	Connecticut	67–60
80	February 17, 2007	Syracuse, NY	Syracuse	73–63
81	March 7, 2007	New York, NY	Syracuse	78–65
82	February 6, 2008	Syracuse, NY	Connecticut	63–61
83	February 11, 2009	Storrs, CT	Connecticut	63–49
84	March 12, 2009	New York, NY	Syracuse	127–117^{6OT}
85	February 10, 2010	Syracuse, NY	Syracuse	72–67
86	February 2, 2011	Hartford, CT	Syracuse	66–58
87	March 11, 2011	New York, NY	Connecticut	76–71^{OT}
88	February 11, 2012	Syracuse, NY	Syracuse	85–67
89	February 25, 2012	Storrs, CT	Syracuse	71–69
90	March 8, 2012	New York, NY	Syracuse	58–55
91	February 13, 2013	Hartford, CT	Connecticut	66–58
92	November 26, 2015	Nassau, Bahamas	Syracuse	79–76
93	December 5, 2016	New York, NY	Connecticut	52–50
94	December 5, 2017	New York, NY	Syracuse	72–63
95	November 15, 2018	New York, NY	Connecticut	83–76
Series: Syracuse leads 56–39

== Football ==
Syracuse–UConn football rivalry
- Syracuse Orange UConn Huskies
- Sport: Football
- First meeting: October 30, 2004; Syracuse 42, UConn 30
- Latest meeting: October 3, 2026; Syracuse 42, UConn 41^{OT}
- Next meeting: November 6, 2027

Statistics
- Total meetings: 15
- All-time series: Syracuse, 7–6
- Largest victory: Syracuse 48–14 (2022)
- Longest unbeaten streak: Syracuse, 7 (2012–present)
- Current unbeaten streak: Syracuse, 7 (2012–present)

=== 2004 ===
In 2004 UConn joined the Big East conference as a football member starting an annual meeting with Syracuse. In the schools first meeting at the Carrier Dome in 2004, UConn quarterback Dan Orlovsky completed a school- and Big East-record 39 passes for a school-record 445 yards, in a 42–30 loss.

Syracuse would later vacate wins from 2004, and 2006 for academic misconduct.

=== Post Big east ===
The 2012 matchup was the schools final meeting as Big East conference members, with Syracuse accepting an invite to the Atlantic Coast Conference and UConn joining the American Athletic Conference. The schools met again in 2016, and 2018 as non conference opponents. Recently the schools announced a four game series starting in 2022. In January 2023 it was announced that Syracuse has added UConn to its non conference schedule with a location to be determined at a later date.

=== Coaching connection ===
Paul Pasqualoni served as head coach at Syracuse from 1991–2004, compiling a 104–59–1 record with the Orange. In 2004 the Orange defeated the Huskies 42–30 in the schools first meeting and Pasqualoni's last season as head coach of Syracuse. After head coach and Syracuse alum, Randy Edsall departed for Maryland in 2011, Pasqualoni was named head coach at UConn in 2011, in the same season he defeated his former Syracuse team by a score of 28–21. Pasqualoni lasted only two seasons with the huskies with a record of 10–18. While at UConn Pasqualoni hired his former offensive coordinator at Syracuse George DeLeone to work in the same role from 2011–2012.

=== Results ===
Connecticut victories	Syracuse victories

No.	Date	Location	Winner	Score
1	October 30, 2004	Syracuse, NY	Syracuse^{†}	42–30
2	October 7, 2005	East Hartford, CT	Connecticut	26–7
3	November 18, 2006	Syracuse, NY	Syracuse^{†}	20–14
4	November 17, 2007	East Hartford, CT	No. 25 Connecticut	30–7
5	November 15, 2008	Syracuse, NY	Connecticut	39–14
6	November 28, 2009	East Hartford, CT	Connecticut	56–31
7	November 20, 2010	Syracuse, NY	Connecticut	23–6
8	November 5, 2011	East Hartford, CT	Connecticut	28–21
9	October 19, 2012	Syracuse, NY	Syracuse	40–10

No.	Date	Location	Winner	Score
10	September 24, 2016	East Hartford, CT	Syracuse	31–24
11	September 22, 2018	Syracuse, NY	Syracuse	51–21
12	September 10, 2022	East Hartford, CT	Syracuse	48–14
13	November 23, 2024	Syracuse, NY	Syracuse	31–24
14	September 6, 2025	Syracuse, NY	Syracuse	27–20^{OT}
15	October 3, 2026	East Hartford, CT	Syracuse	42–41^{OT}
Series: Syracuse leads 7–6
† Vacated by Syracuse

== Women's basketball ==
Syracuse–UConn women's basketball rivalry
- Syracuse Orange UConn Huskies
- Sport: Basketball
- First meeting: December 29, 1980
- Latest meeting: March 23, 2026; UConn 98–45 (2026)

Statistics
- Total meetings: 54
- All-time series: UConn leads 42–12
- Largest victory: UConn 105–43 (February 23, 1999)
- Current unbeaten streak: UConn, 28 (1997–present)

In 2016 the UConn and Syracuse women faced off in the NCAA national championship game. UConn won the game 82–51, finishing the season with a record of 38–0 while capturing their fourth straight national championship. The teams would meet again in the Bridgeport regional of the 2017 NCAA tournament with UConn winning 94–64.

=== Results ===
Connecticut victories	Syracuse victories

No.	Date	Location	Winner	Score
1	December 29, 1980	Philadelphia, PA	Syracuse	73–68
2	February 13, 1982	Storrs, CT	Syracuse	86–78
3	February 2, 1983	Syracuse, NY	Syracuse	90–64
4	February 25, 1984	Storrs, CT	Syracuse	61–56
5	January 12, 1985	Syracuse, NY	Syracuse	82–61
6	February 13, 1985	Storrs, CT	Syracuse	74–59
7	January 4, 1986	Syracuse, NY	Syracuse	68–60
8	February 1, 1986	Storrs, CT	Syracuse	78–72
9	January 17, 1987	Syracuse, NY	Syracuse	67–52
10	February 18, 1987	Storrs, CT	Connecticut	52–49
11	January 20, 1988	Syracuse, NY	Syracuse	68–54
12	February 20, 1988	Hartford, CT	Connecticut	74–60
13	January 21, 1989	Syracuse, NY	Syracuse	77–60
14	January 8, 1990	Syracuse, NY	Connecticut	58–42
15	February 7, 1990	Storrs, CT	Connecticut	68–56
16	January 16, 1991	Syracuse, NY	Connecticut	65–63
17	February 17, 1991	Storrs, CT	Connecticut	85–49
18	January 15, 1992	Storrs, CT	Connecticut	68–51
19	February 15, 1992	Syracuse, NY	Connecticut	83–68
20	January 2, 1993	Syracuse, NY	Connecticut	78–50
21	February 7, 1993	Storrs, CT	Connecticut	85–54
22	January 3, 1994	Storrs, CT	Connecticut	64–45
23	February 24, 1994	Syracuse, NY	Connecticut	79–50
24	January 25, 1995	Storrs, CT	Connecticut	89–58
25	February 25, 1995	Syracuse, NY	Connecticut	89–62
26	January 2, 1996	Syracuse, NY	Syracuse	62–59
27	January 7, 1997	Storrs, CT	Connecticut	93–67
28	February 26, 1997	Syracuse, NY	Connecticut	86–52

No.	Date	Location	Winner	Score
29	February 1, 1998	Storrs, CT	Connecticut	100–62
30	February 3, 1999	Storrs, CT	Connecticut	96–50
31	February 23, 1999	Syracuse, NY	Connecticut	105–43
32	February 18, 2000	Storrs, CT	Connecticut	100–74
33	January 9, 2001	Syracuse, NY	Connecticut	76–63
34	January 27, 2001	Hartford, CT	Connecticut	84–60
35	February 13, 2002	Syracuse, NY	Connecticut	85–55
36	February 12, 2003	Hartford, CT	Connecticut	75–51
37	February 11, 2004	Syracuse, NY	Connecticut	82–38
38	February 19, 2005	Hartford, CT	Connecticut	85–49
39	March 6, 2005	Hartford, CT	Connecticut	82–56
40	February 22, 2006	Syracuse, NY	Connecticut	65–36
41	January 13, 2007	Storrs, CT	Connecticut	76–45
42	January 15, 2008	Syracuse, NY	Connecticut	65–59
43	January 17, 2009	Hartford, CT	Connecticut	107–53
44	February 24, 2010	Syracuse, NY	Connecticut	87–66
45	March 7, 2010	Hartford, CT	Connecticut	77–41
46	February 28, 2011	Storrs, CT	Connecticut	82–47
47	January 25, 2012	Syracuse, NY	Connecticut	95–54
48	January 19, 2013	Hartford, CT	Connecticut	87–62
49	March 11, 2013	Hartford, CT	Connecticut	64–51
50	April 5, 2016	Indianapolis, IN	Connecticut	81–52
51	March 20, 2017	Bridgeport, CT	Connecticut	94–64
52	March 23, 2021	San Antonio, TX	Connecticut	83–47
53	March 25, 2024	Storrs, CT	Connecticut	72–64
54	March 23, 2026	Storrs, CT	Connecticut	98–45
Series: Connecticut leads 42–12
