= 1981–82 USC Trojans men's basketball team =

American college basketball season

1981–82 USC Trojans men's basketball

NCAA tournament, First round
- Conference: Pacific-10 Conference
- Record: 19–9 (13–5 Pac-10)
- Head coach: Stan Morrison (3rd season)
- Home arena: L. A. Sports Arena

1981–82 Pacific-10 Conference men's basketball standings
	Conf.				Overall
Team	W		L	PCT	W		L	PCT
No. 4 Oregon State	16	–	2	.889	25	–	5	.833
No. 19 UCLA	14	–	4	.778	21	–	6	.778
USC	13	–	5	.722	19	–	9	.679
Washington	11	–	7	.611	19	–	10	.655
Washington State	10	–	8	.556	16	–	14	.533
California	8	–	10	.444	14	–	13	.519
Arizona State	8	–	10	.444	13	–	14	.481
Oregon	4	–	14	.222	9	–	18	.333
Arizona	4	–	14	.222	9	–	18	.333
Stanford	2	–	16	.111	7	–	20	.259
As of April 15, 1982; Rankings from AP Poll

The 1981–82 USC Trojans men's basketball team represented the University of Southern California during the 1981–82 NCAA Division I men's basketball season. Led by head coach Stan Morrison, they played their home games at the L. A. Sports Arena in Los Angeles, California as members of the Pac-10 Conference. The Trojans were 13–5 in the Pac-10, finishing third behind Oregon State and UCLA. USC received a bid to the NCAA tournament as No. 9 seed in the West region where they fell to Wyoming in the opening round.

== Roster ==
1981–82 USC Trojans men's basketball team
Players
Coaches

Pos.	#	Name	Height	Weight	Year	Previous school	Hometown
G	11	Dwight Anderson	6 ft 3 in (1.91 m)	180 lb (82 kg)	Sr	Kentucky	Dayton, OH
G		Ron Holmes	6 ft 5 in (1.96 m)	—	Fr
F	44	Ken Johnson	6 ft 8 in (2.03 m)	225 lb (102 kg)	Fr	La Jolla	La Jolla, CA
F	52	Wayne Carlander	6 ft 6 in (1.98 m)	220 lb (100 kg)	Fr	Ocean View	Huntington Beach, CA
G		Jon Korfas	5 ft 11 in (1.8 m)	165 lb (75 kg)	Fr	San Marcos	Santa Barbara, California

Head coach

- Stan Morrison (California)

Assistant coach(es)

Legend

- (C) Team captain
- (S) Suspended
- (I) Ineligible
- (W) Walk-on
- Injured
- Current redshirt

== Schedule and results ==
Date time, TV	Rank^{#}	Opponent^{#}	Result	Record	Site (attendance) city, state
Non-conference regular season
Nov 27, 1981*		Loyola Marymount	W 87–75	1–0	L.A. Sports Arena; Los Angeles, California
Nov 30, 1981*		vs. No. 1 North Carolina	L 62–73	1–1	Greensboro Coliseum; Greensboro, North Carolina
Dec 4, 1981*		New Mexico	W 80–71	2–1	L.A. Sports Arena; Los Angeles, California
Dec 7, 1981*		at Portland	L 67–72	2–2	Howard Hall; Portland, Oregon
Dec 12, 1981*		at Long Beach State	W 74–66	3–2	Long Beach Arena; Long Beach, California
Dec 21, 1981*		Oral Roberts	W 95–75	4–2	L.A. Sports Arena; Los Angeles, California
Dec 23, 1981*		Richmond	W 83–78	5–2	L.A. Sports Arena; Los Angeles, California
Dec 27, 1981*		Michigan	W 77–63	6–2	L.A. Sports Arena; Los Angeles, California
Dec 28, 1981*		No. 7 Missouri	L 58–65	6–3	L.A. Sports Arena; Los Angeles, California
Pac-10 regular season
Jan 2, 1982		at Washington	L 72–73	6–4 (0–1)	Hec Edmundson Pavilion; Seattle, Washington
Jan 4, 1982		at Washington State	W 57–56	7–4 (1–1)	Beasley Coliseum; Pullman, Washington
Jan 9, 1982		No. 19 UCLA	W 86–71	8–4 (2–1)	L.A. Sports Arena; Los Angeles, California
Jan 15, 1982		Arizona	W 89–67	9–4 (3–1)	L.A. Sports Arena; Los Angeles, California
Jan 16, 1982		Arizona State	W 64–57	10–4 (4–1)	L.A. Sports Arena; Los Angeles, California
Jan 22, 1982		at California	W 66–59	11–4 (5–1)	Harmon Gym; Berkeley, California
Jan 23, 1982		at Stanford	W 85–74	12–4 (6–1)	Maples Pavilion; Stanford, California
Jan 29, 1982		Oregon	W 107–91	13–4 (7–1)	L.A. Sports Arena; Los Angeles, California
Jan 30, 1982		No. 8 Oregon State	L 55–72	13–5 (7–2)	L.A. Sports Arena (11,004); Los Angeles, California
Feb 5, 1982		at UCLA	L 66–69	13–6 (7–3)	Pauley Pavilion; Los Angeles, California
Feb 13, 1982		at Arizona	W 60–59	14–6 (8–3)	McKale Center; Tucson, Arizona
Feb 15, 1982		at Arizona State	L 62–80	14–7 (8–4)	ASU Activity Center; Tempe, Arizona
Feb 19, 1982		Stanford	W 74–59	15–7 (9–4)	L.A. Sports Arena; Los Angeles, California
Feb 20, 1982		California	W 75–70	16–7 (10–4)	L.A. Sports Arena; Los Angeles, California
Feb 26, 1982		at Oregon	W 80–68	17–7 (11–4)	McArthur Court; Eugene, Oregon
Feb 27, 1982		at No. 4 Oregon State	L 36–45	17–8 (11–5)	Gill Coliseum; Corvallis, Oregon
Mar 5, 1982		Washington State	W 61–56	18–8 (12–5)	L.A. Sports Arena; Los Angeles, California
Mar 6, 1982		Washington	W 76–70	19–8 (13–5)	L.A. Sports Arena; Los Angeles, California
NCAA Tournament
Mar 11, 1982*	(9 W)	vs. (8 W) Wyoming; First round	L 58–61	19–9	Dee Glen Smith Spectrum; Logan, Utah
*Non-conference game. ^{#}Rankings from AP Poll. (#) Tournament seedings in parentheses. All times are in Pacific Time.
