= Bobby Paschal =

American college basketball coach (born 1941)

Biographical details
- Born: October 22, 1941 (age 85); Enterprise, Alabama, U.S.

Playing career
- 1960–1962: Chipola JC
- 1962–1964: Stetson

Coaching career (HC unless noted)
- 1965–1968: Ashford HS (AL)
- 1968–1970: Plant HS (FL)
- 1970–1971: Livingston (assistant)
- 1971–1974: Florida Southern (assistant)
- 1974–1978: Southwestern Louisiana (assistant)
- 1978–1986: Southwestern Louisiana
- 1986–1996: South Florida

Head coaching record
- Overall: 280–244 (.534) (college)
- Tournaments: 0–4 (NCAA Division I); 8–6 (NIT)

Accomplishments and honors

Championships
- Southland regular season (1982); Southland tournament (1982); Sun Belt tournament (1990)

Awards
- Southland Coach of the Year (1982); Sun Belt Coach of the Year (1990)

Bobby Paschal (born October 22, 1941) is an American retired college basketball coach. He was head coach of the South Florida Bulls team from 1986 to 1996, as well as the Southwestern Louisiana Ragin' Cajuns from 1978 to 1986.

A native of Enterprise, Alabama, Paschal played college basketball at Chipola College and Stetson University in Florida. Following the close of his college career, he coached at the high school level at Ashford High School in Alabama and then Plant High School in Tampa. He then spent a year as an assistant at Livingston College (now the University of West Alabama) while obtaining a master's degree before moving to Florida Southern College. He moved to Southwestern Louisiana in 1974 and was elevated to head coach with the departure of Jim Hatfield.

Over his career, Bobby Paschal was head coach of two NCAA Division I programs. He had a career won/loss record of 280-244 which included four NCAA tournament appearances and six NIT tournament appearances. One Bobby Paschal coached team reached the NIT final four. Another made an NIT elite eight appearance. In Paschal's eight years with the Ragin' Cajuns, his team's 153 wins rank fourth in the number of wins for the program. His teams ranked second in Ragin' Cajun history in winning percentage at .643 (153–85). His 1981-82 and 1982–83 teams competed in the NCAA tournament. Four of his teams competed in the NIT tournament (1979–80, 1980–81, 1983–84, 1984–85) with the 1983–84 team reaching the tournament's final four. In addition to the 1983–84 team, his 1979-80 and 1984–85 teams reached the second round of the NIT.

Paschal's overall coaching record at South Florida was 127-159 which included one conference tournament championship, two NCAA tournament appearances, and two NIT tournament appearances. Bobby Paschal's ten years at South Florida saw the Bulls compete in three conferences. As members of the Sun Belt Conference from the 1986–87 season to the 1990–91 season, the Bulls competed in the program's first NCAA tournament, the 1990 NCAA Men's Division I Basketball Tournament, after winning the Sun Belt Conference tournament championship. The following year, South Florida's last season in the Sun Belt, the Bulls returned to post season play competing in the 1991 National Invitation Tournament. The following year, as a new member of the Metro Conference, the Paschal coached Bulls received an at large bid to the 1992 NCAA Men's Division I Basketball Tournament. At the end of the 1994–95 season, the Bulls's last season as a Metro Conference member, the Bobby Paschal coached team returned to the NIT advancing to the tournament's second round. The next season saw a new conference as well as a new conference for the Bulls following the merger of the Metro Conference and the Great Midwest Conference. That season also marked the final season for Bobby Paschal as a head coach. He remained at the university an additional eight years. In 2013, Bobby Paschal was named to the South Florida Bulls Hall of Fame.

== Head coaching record ==
Record table
Season	Team	Overall	Conference	Standing	Postseason
Southwestern Louisiana Ragin' Cajuns (Southland Conference) (1978–1982)
1978–79	Southwestern Louisiana	16–11	6–4	T–2nd	
1979–80	Southwestern Louisiana	21–9	5–5	T–2nd	NIT Quarterfinals
1980–81	Southwestern Louisiana	15–13	6–4	4th	
1981–82	Southwestern Louisiana	24–8	8–2	1st	NCAA Division I First Round
Southwestern Louisiana Ragin' Cajuns (NCAA Division I Independent) (1982–1986)
1982–83	Southwestern Louisiana	22–7			NCAA Division I First Round
1983–84	Southwestern Louisiana	23–10			NIT Fourth Place
1984–85	Southwestern Louisiana	17–14			NIT Second Round
1985–86	Southwestern Louisiana	15–13			
Southwestern Louisiana:		153–85 (.643)	25–15 (.625)		
South Florida Bulls (Sun Belt Conference) (1986–1991)
1986–87	South Florida	8–20	3–11	7th	
1987–88	South Florida	6–22	3–11	7th	
1988–89	South Florida	7–21	2–12	8th	
1989–90	South Florida	20–11	9–5	2nd	NCAA Division I First Round
1990–91	South Florida	19–11	8–6	T–3rd	NIT First Round
South Florida Bulls (Metro Conference) (1991–1995)
1991–92	South Florida	19–10	7–5	T–2nd	NCAA Division I First Round
1992–93	South Florida	8–19	2–10	6th	
1993–94	South Florida	10–17	2–10	7th	
1994–95	South Florida	18–12	5–7	6th	NIT Quarterfinals
South Florida Bulls (Conference USA) (1995–1996)
1995–96	South Florida	12–16	2–12	4th (Red)	
South Florida:		127–159 (.444)	43–89 (.326)		
Total:		280–244 (.534)			
National champion Postseason invitational champion Conference regular season champion Conference regular season and conference tournament champion Division regular season champion Division regular season and conference tournament champion Conference tournament champion
