= 1982 MAC men's basketball tournament =

- Classification: Division I
- Season: 1981–82
- Teams: 7
- First round site: Campus Arenas; Campus Sites
- Finals site: Crisler Arena; Ann Arbor, MI
- Champions: Northern Illinois (1st title)
- Winning coach: John McDougal (1st title)
- MVP: Allen Rayhorn (Ball State)
- MAC men's basketball tournaments

1981–82 Mid-American Conference men's basketball standings
	Conf.				Overall
Team	W		L	PCT	W		L	PCT
Ball State	12	–	4	.750	17	–	11	.607
Bowling Green	10	–	6	.625	18	–	11	.621
Northern Illinois †	9	–	7	.563	16	–	14	.533
Eastern Michigan	8	–	8	.500	15	–	12	.556
Western Michigan	8	–	8	.500	15	–	14	.517
Ohio	8	–	8	.500	13	–	14	.481
Miami	8	–	8	.500	11	–	16	.407
Toledo	7	–	9	.438	15	–	11	.577
Kent State	6	–	10	.375	10	–	16	.385
Central Michigan	4	–	12	.250	10	–	16	.385
† 1982 MAC tournament winner Rankings from AP Poll

The 1982 MAC men's basketball tournament was held March 1–3 at Crisler Arena in Ann Arbor, Michigan. Northern Illinois defeated Ball State in the championship game by the score of 79–75 to win their first MAC men's basketball tournament and a bid to the NCAA tournament. There they lost to Kansas State in the first round. Allen Rayhorn of Northern Illinois was named the tournament MVP.

== Format ==
Seven of the ten MAC teams participated. First Round games were played in the home arena of the higher seeded team. The semi-finals and final were played at Crisler Arena in Ann Arbor, Michigan.

== Bracket ==
Quarterfinals; March 1
5	Western Michigan	44
4	Eastern Michigan	42
3	Northern Illinois	70
6	Ohio	68
7	Miami (OH)	78
2	Bowling Green	81

Semifinals; March 2
1	Ball State	76
5	Western Michigan	72
3	Northern Illinois	67
2	Bowling Green	66

Final; March 3
1	Ball State	75
3	Northern Illinois	79
Third place
2	Bowling Green	86
5	Western Michigan	83
