= 1981–82 Ohio Bobcats men's basketball team =

American college basketball season

1981–82 Ohio Bobcats men's basketball
- Conference: Mid-American Conference
- Record: 13–14 (8–8 MAC)
- Head coach: Danny Nee (2nd season)
- Home arena: Convocation Center

1981–82 Mid-American Conference men's basketball standings
	Conf.				Overall
Team	W		L	PCT	W		L	PCT
Ball State	12	–	4	.750	17	–	11	.607
Bowling Green	10	–	6	.625	18	–	11	.621
Northern Illinois †	9	–	7	.563	16	–	14	.533
Eastern Michigan	8	–	8	.500	15	–	12	.556
Western Michigan	8	–	8	.500	15	–	14	.517
Ohio	8	–	8	.500	13	–	14	.481
Miami	8	–	8	.500	11	–	16	.407
Toledo	7	–	9	.438	15	–	11	.577
Kent State	6	–	10	.375	10	–	16	.385
Central Michigan	4	–	12	.250	10	–	16	.385
† 1982 MAC tournament winner Rankings from AP Poll

The 1981–82 Ohio Bobcats men's basketball team represented Ohio University as a member of the Mid-American Conference in the college basketball season of 1981–82. The team was coached by Danny Nee in his second season at Ohio. They played their home games at Convocation Center. The Bobcats finished with a record of 13–14 and sixth in the MAC regular season with a conference record of 8–8.

== Schedule ==
Date time, TV	Rank^{#}	Opponent^{#}	Result	Record	Site (attendance) city, state
Regular Season
11/28/1981*		at East Carolina	L 54–72	0–1	
11/30/1981*		at UNC Wilmington	W 66–62	1–1	
12/2/1981*		at Marquette	L 45–49	1–2	MECCA Arena (11,052); Milwaukee, WI
12/4/1981*		Green Bay	W 68–57	2–2	
12/5/1981*		Illinois-Chicago	L 55–63	2–3	
12/19/1981*		at Maryland	L 64–90	2–4	
1/2/1982*		Capital	W 70–41	3–4	
MAC regular season
1/6/1982		Bowling Green	L 65–68 ^{OT}	3–5 (0–1)	
1/9/1982		at Eastern Michigan	L 57–62	3–6 (0–2)	
1/13/1982		Toledo	W 69–67	4–6 (1–2)	
1/16/1982		at Northern Illinois	W 69–67 ^{OT}	5–6 (2–2)	
1/18/1982*		Loyola (MD)	W 77–63	6–6	
1/20/1982		Ball State	W 68–67	7–6 (3–2)	
1/23/1982		at Miami (OH)	W 64–62	8-6 (4–2)	
1/25/1982*		Radford	W 70–54	9-6	
1/27/1982		Western Michigan	L 47–49	9–7 (4–3)	
1/30/1982		at Kent State	L 67–83	9–8 (4–4)	
2/3/1982		at Central Michigan	W 72–67	10–8 (5–4)	
2/6/1982		Eastern Michigan	W 72–54	11–8 (6–4)	
2/10/1982		at Toledo	L 64–74	11–9 (6–5)	
2/13/1982		Northern Illinois	L 68–70	11–10 (6–6)	
2/15/1982*		at No. 3 DePaul	L 61–83	11–11	Allstate Arena (13,180); Rosemont, IL
2/17/1982		at Ball State	L 49–59	11–12 (6–7)	
2/20/1982		Miami (OH)	W 78–54	12–12 (7–7)	
2/24/1982		at Western Michigan	L 53–60	12–13 (7–8)	
2/27/1982		Kent State	W 71–59	13–13 (8–8)	
MAC tournament
3/2/1982		at Northern Illinois	L 68–70 ^{OT}	13–14 (8–9)	
*Non-conference game. ^{#}Rankings from AP Poll. (#) Tournament seedings in parentheses. All times are in Eastern Time.

== Statistics ==
=== Team statistics ===
Final 1981–82 statistics

Record	Ohio	OPP
Scoring	1731	1746
Scoring Average	64.11	64.67
Field goals – Att	684–1469	658–1450
Free throws – Att	363–531	430–618
Rebounds	930	901
Assists	370	387
Turnovers	425	387
Steals		
Blocked Shots	97	58

== Statistics ==
=== Team statistics ===
"Final 1980–81 Statistics"

Record	Ohio	OPP
Scoring	1758	2005
Scoring Average	65.11	74.26
Field goals – Att	710–1619	768–1597
Free throws – Att	338–507	469–653
Rebounds	978	979
Assists		
Turnovers		
Steals		
Blocked Shots		

=== Player statistics ===
			Minutes		Scoring		Total FGs			Free-Throws			Rebounds						
Player	GP	GS	Tot	Avg	Pts	Avg	FG	FGA	Pct	FT	FTA	Pct	Tot	Avg	A	PF	TO	Stl	Blk
Tim Woodson	26	-	887	34.1	349	13.4	143	305	0.469	63	85	0.741	167	6.4	30	68	54	17	3
Kirk Lehman	27	-	936	34.7	324	12.0	118	255	0.463	88	112	0.786	53	2.0	103	79	70	29	0
Eric Hilton	27	-	783	29.0	253	9.4	94	193	0.487	65	95	0.684	68	2.5	79	51	78	28	3
John Devereaux	27	-	692	25.6	227	8.4	97	229	0.424	33	52	0.635	181	6.7	22	89	42	15	30
Jim Zalenka	27	-	562	20.8	176	6.5	75	194	0.387	26	41	0.634	74	2.7	18	78	30	22	2
Nate Cole	27	-	600	22.2	173	6.4	73	170	0.429	27	59	0.458	140	5.2	23	93	56	22	1
Sean Carlson	26	-	524	20.2	129	5.0	53	126	0.421	23	40	0.575	96	3.7	25	73	29	3	16
Mick Isgrigg	24	-	264	11.0	78	3.3	37	97	0.381	4	8	0.500	33	1.4	9	12	18	6	1
Willie Stevenson	16	-	75	4.7	20	1.3	9	22	0.409	2	4	0.500	3	0.2	6	12	13	3	0
James Towns	15	-	91	6.1	17	1.1	7	18	0.389	3	5	0.600	8	0.5	7	18	12	0	1
Dennis Dylewski	9	-		0.0	6	0.7	2	6	0.333	2	2	1.000	4	0.4					
Steve Becvar	2	-	14	7.0	4	2.0	1	2	0.500	2	3	0.667	4	2.0	2	1	1	1	0
Dave Mathews	2	-		0.0	2	1.0	1	2	0.500	0	1	0.000	4	2.0					
Total	27	-	-	-	1758	65.1	710	1619	0.439	338	507	0.667	978	36.2	0	584	0	0	0
Opponents	27	-	-	-	2005	74.3	768	1597	0.481	469	653	0.718	979	36.3		530			

Legend
GP	Games played	GS	Games started	Avg	Average per game
FG	Field-goals made	FGA	Field-goal attempts	Off	Offensive rebounds
Def	Defensive rebounds	A	Assists	TO	Turnovers
Blk	Blocks	Stl	Steals	High	Team high
