= 1982 Southland Conference men's basketball tournament =

- Classification: Division I
- Season: 1981–82
- Teams: 5
- Site: Blackham Coliseum; Lafayette, Louisiana
- Champions: Southwestern Louisiana (1st title)
- Winning coach: Bobby Paschal (1st title)
- MVP: Alford Turner (Southwestern Louisiana)

1981–82 Southland Conference men's basketball standings
	Conf.				Overall
Team	W		L	PCT	W		L	PCT
SW Louisiana †	8	–	2	.800	24	–	8	.750
Lamar	7	–	3	.700	22	–	7	.759
Texas-Arlington	6	–	4	.600	16	–	12	.571
McNeese State	4	–	6	.400	14	–	15	.483
Arkansas State	3	–	7	.300	15	–	11	.577
Louisiana Tech	2	–	8	.200	11	–	16	.407
North Texas State	0	–	0	–	15	–	12	.556
† 1982 Southland tournament winner Rankings from AP poll

The 1982 Southland Conference men's basketball tournament was held March 5–7, 1982 at Blackham Coliseum in Lafayette, Louisiana.

Southwestern Louisiana defeated Texas-Arlington in the championship game, 81–75, to win their first Southland men's basketball tournament.

The Ragin' Cajuns received a bid to the 1982 NCAA Tournament as No. 8 seed in the Mideast region. They were the only Southland member invited to the NCAA tournament. Regular season runner-up Lamar received an invitation to the 1982 NIT Tournament.

== Format ==
Five of seven of the conference's members participated in the tournament field. They were seeded based on regular season conference records, with the top two seeds earning byes into the semifinal round. Arkansas State and North Texas State did not participate. McNeese State and Louisiana Tech began play in the quarterfinal round.

All games were played at Blackham Coliseum in Lafayette, Louisiana.

== Bracket ==
Quarterfinals; Tuesday, March 5
4	McNeese State	78
5	Louisiana Tech	77

Semifinals; Wednesday, March 6
1	SW Louisiana	105
4	McNeese State	69
3	Texas-Arlington	78
2	Lamar	73

Championship; Thursday, March 7
1	SW Louisiana	81
3	Texas-Arlington	75
