= 2009 Connecticut vs. Syracuse men's basketball game =

American college basketball game

2009 Connecticut vs. Syracuse "6-overtime game"
Big East Tournament Quarterfinals
Syracuse Orange	Connecticut Huskies
(24–8)	(27–3)
127	117
Head coach: Jim Boeheim	Head coach: Jim Calhoun
- AP: 18
- Coaches: 20
- AP: 3
- Coaches: 4
	1st half	2nd half	OT	2OT	3OT	4OT	5OT	6OT	Total
Syracuse Orange	34	37	10	6	11	6	6	17	127
Connecticut Huskies	37	34	10	6	11	6	6	7	117
- Date: March 12–13, 2009
- Venue: Madison Square Garden, New York, New York
- Referees: John Cahill, Bob Donato, and James Breeding
- Attendance: 19,375

United States TV coverage
- Network: ESPN
- Announcers: Sean McDonough, Bill Raftery and Jay Bilas

The 2009 Connecticut vs. Syracuse men's basketball game was a quarterfinal game of the 2009 Big East men's basketball tournament between the No. 18 Syracuse Orange (No. 6 seed in Big East Tournament) and No. 3 Connecticut (UConn) Huskies. The 2009 UConn–Syracuse basketball game took place on Thursday, March 12, 2009 at Madison Square Garden in New York City.

This quarterfinal game of the 2009 Big East Tournament went to six overtimes, resulting in a 127–117 Syracuse victory. The Orange won the game without leading at any time during the first five overtimes. The game began at 9:36 p.m. and ended at 1:22 a.m. on March 13, 2009, spanning 3 hours and 46 minutes. During the game, 244 total points were scored (102 scored during overtime), 211 field goals were attempted (103 attempted in overtime), 93 free throws were attempted, 66 fouls were committed, and eight total players fouled out (four from each team).

This game was the second-longest in college basketball history and the longest in Big East history. The longest game in college basketball history was the 1981 Cincinnati vs. Bradley game in which Cincinnati beat Bradley 75–73 on December 21, 1981. That game took place before the implementation of the shot clock. Two other men's basketball games that involved teams now in NCAA Division I reached six overtime periods, both occurring in the era before the NCAA officially split into competitive divisions. Niagara defeated Siena 88–81 in 1953, and Minnesota defeated Purdue 59–56 in 1955.

== See also ==
- 2009 Big East men's basketball tournament
- Syracuse–UConn rivalry
