= 1982 Metro Conference men's basketball tournament =

- Classification: Division I
- Season: 1981–82
- Teams: 7
- Site: Mid-South Coliseum; Memphis, TN
- Champions: Memphis State (1st title)
- Winning coach: Dana Kirk (1st title)
- MVP: Keith Lee (Memphis State)

1981–82 Metro Conference men's basketball standings
	Conf.				Overall
Team	W		L	PCT	W		L	PCT
No. 9 Memphis State †	10	–	2	.833	23	–	4	.852
No. 20 Louisville	8	–	4	.667	23	–	10	.697
Tulane	8	–	4	.667	19	–	9	.679
Virginia Tech	7	–	5	.583	20	–	11	.645
Cincinnati	4	–	8	.333	15	–	12	.556
Florida State	4	–	8	.333	11	–	17	.393
Saint Louis	1	–	11	.083	6	–	21	.222
† 1982 Metro Conference tournament winner Rankings from AP Poll; *Memphis State vacated NCAA Tournament games due to NCAA sanctions. Disputed record (24–5)

The 1982 Metro Conference men's basketball tournament was held March 4–6 at Mid-South Coliseum in Memphis, Tennessee.

Memphis State defeated Louisville in the championship game, 73–62, to win their first Metro men's basketball tournament.

The Tigers received an automatic bid to the 1982 NCAA Tournament. Louisville received an at-large bid, and would go on to reach the Final Four.

== Format ==
All seven of the conference's members participated. They were seeded based on regular season conference records, with the top team earning a bye into the semifinal round. The other six teams entered into the preliminary first round.

== Bracket ==
Quarterfinals; Thursday, March 4
4	Virginia Tech	106
5	Cincinnati	92
3	Tulane	49
6	Florida State	54
7	Saint Louis	44
2	Louisville	76

Semifinals; Friday, March 5
1	Memphis State	71
4	Virginia Tech	70
6	Florida State	73
2	Louisville	97

Championship; Saturday, March 6
1	Memphis State	73
2	Louisville	62
