= 1981–82 Penn State Nittany Lions basketball team =

American college basketball season

1981–82 Penn State Nittany Lions men's basketball
- Conference: Independent
- Record: 15–12
- Head coach: Dick Harter (4th season)
- Assistant coach: Perry Clark (4th season)
- Home arena: Rec Hall

1981–82 NCAA Division I men's basketball independents standings
	Conf.				Overall
Team	W		L	PCT	W		L	PCT
No. 2 DePaul		–		–	26	–	2	.929
Marquette		–		–	23	–	9	.719
Dayton		–		–	21	–	9	.700
New Orleans		–		–	18	–	8	.692
UNLV		–		–	20	–	10	.667
Cleveland State		–		–	17	–	10	.630
Southeastern Louisiana		–		–	16	–	11	.593
Southern Mississippi		–		–	15	–	11	.577
Penn State		–		–	15	–	12	.556
Tennessee State		–		–	13	–	12	.520
Eastern Illinois		–		–	14	–	13	.519
Green Bay		–		–	14	–	13	.519
Illinois-Chicago		–		–	14	–	13	.519
Western Illinois		–		–	14	–	13	.519
Charleston Southern		–		–	13	–	13	.500
South Carolina		–		–	14	–	15	.483
UNC Wilmington		–		–	13	–	14	.481
Northern Iowa		–		–	12	–	15	.444
Stetson		–		–	12	–	15	.444
Campbell		–		–	11	–	16	.407
Notre Dame		–		–	10	–	17	.370
U.S. International		–		–	9	–	18	.333
Valparaiso		–		–	9	–	18	.333
Texas-San Antonio		–		–	8	–	19	.296
Nicholls State		–		–	6	–	20	.231
Texas-Rio Grande Valley		–		–	5	–	20	.200
Utica		–		–	4	–	22	.154
Georgia State		–		–	4	–	23	.148
As of Rankings from AP Poll

The 1981–82 Penn State Nittany Lions men's basketball team represented the Pennsylvania State University during the 1981–82 NCAA Division I men's basketball season. The team was led by 4th-year head coach Dick Harter, and played their home games at Rec Hall in University Park, Pennsylvania.

== Roster ==
1981–82 Penn State Nittany Lions men's basketball team
Players
Coaches

Pos.	#	Name	Height	Weight	Year	Hometown
G	12	Craig Buffie	6 ft 3 in (1.91 m)	185 lb (84 kg)	Jr	Bloomington, Indiana
G	22	Wally Choice	6 ft 3 in (1.91 m)	156 lb (71 kg)	So	Montclair, New Jersey
F	24	Brian Dean	6 ft 5 in (1.96 m)	212 lb (96 kg)	So	Harrisburg, Pennsylvania
G	10	Mike Edelman	6 ft 2 in (1.88 m)	180 lb (82 kg)	Sr	Havertown, Pennsylvania
F	44	Rich Fetter	6 ft 7 in (2.01 m)	215 lb (98 kg)	Jr	Riverton, Illinois
G	23	Jim Forjan	6 ft 1 in (1.85 m)	157 lb (71 kg)	So	York, Pennsylvania
F	45	David Griffin	6 ft 7 in (2.01 m)	188 lb (85 kg)	So	Cleveland, Ohio
C	52	Mike Lang	6 ft 9 in (2.06 m)	240 lb (109 kg)	Jr	Lombard, Illinois
C	42	Dick Mumma	6 ft 10 in (2.08 m)	200 lb (91 kg)	So	Bedford, Pennsylvania

Head coach

- Dick Harter

Assistant coach(es)

- Perry Clark

Legend

- (C) Team captain
- (S) Suspended
- (I) Ineligible
- (W) Walk-on
- Injured
- Current redshirt

== Schedule ==
Date time, TV	Rank^{#}	Opponent^{#}	Result	Record	Site city, state
November 28		Bloomsburg	W 49–48	1–0	Rec Hall; University Park, Pennsylvania
November 30		Rider	W 70–54	2–0	Rec Hall; University Park, Pennsylvania
December 2		Indiana State	W 60–50	3–0	Rec Hall; University Park, Pennsylvania
December 5		at Charlotte	L 78–88	3–1	Charlotte, NC
December 8		vs. Lafayette	W 63–62	4–1	
December 11		vs. SMU	W 65–53	5–1	
December 12		at No. 10 Indiana; Indiana Classic	L 51–80	5–2	Assembly Hall; Bloomington, Indiana
December 19		vs. No. 14 Alabama	L 74–88	5–3	
December 21		Nebraska	W 60–58	6–3	Rec Hall; University Park, Pennsylvania
December 28		vs. No. 1 North Carolina; Cable Car Classic	L 50–56 ^{OT}	6–4	Toso Pavilion; Santa Clara, California
December 29		vs. TCU	W 54–49	7–4	
January 2		at No. 8 DePaul	L 60–86	7–5	Rosemont Horizon (12,321); Rosemont, Illinois
January 9		Philadelphia Textile	W 84–68	8–5	Rec Hall; University Park, Pennsylvania
January 13		South Florida	W 63–56	9–5	Rec Hall; University Park, Pennsylvania
January 16		Pittsburgh	W 52–46	10–5	Rec Hall; University Park, Pennsylvania
January 18		at West Virginia	L 68–75	10–6	WVU Coliseum; Morgantown, WV
January 23		at Penn	L 44–58	10–7	The Palestra; Philadelphia, Pennsylvania
January 25		Syracuse	L 68–69	10–8	Rec Hall; University Park, Pennsylvania
January 27		Temple	W 53–50	11–8	Rec Hall; University Park, Pennsylvania
February 1		Bradley	L 42–59	11–9	Rec Hall; University Park, Pennsylvania
February 6		at Navy	W 62–54 ^{OT}	12–9	Halsey Field House
February 9		at Duquesne	W 74–69	13–9	Civic Arena; Pittsburgh, Pennsylvania
February 15		South Carolina	W 62–60	14–9	Rec Hall; University Park, Pennsylvania
February 17		at Niagara	L 80–92	14–10	Niagara Falls Convention Center
February 20		No. 12 Memphis State	L 46–52	14–11	Rec Hall; University Park, Pennsylvania
February 22		Westminster	W 64–50	15–11	Rec Hall; University Park, Pennsylvania
March 2		Cleveland State	L 61–66	15–12	Rec Hall; University Park, Pennsylvania
*Non-conference game. ^{#}Rankings from AP Poll. (#) Tournament seedings in parentheses.
