= 1981–82 Northern Illinois Huskies men's basketball team =

American college basketball season

1981–82 Northern Illinois Huskies men's basketball

MAC tournament champions

NCAA tournament, first round
- Conference: Mid American Conference
- Record: 16–14 (9–7 MAC)
- Head coach: John McDougal
- Home arena: Chick Evans Field House

1981–82 Mid-American Conference men's basketball standings
	Conf.				Overall
Team	W		L	PCT	W		L	PCT
Ball State	12	–	4	.750	17	–	11	.607
Bowling Green	10	–	6	.625	18	–	11	.621
Northern Illinois †	9	–	7	.563	16	–	14	.533
Eastern Michigan	8	–	8	.500	15	–	12	.556
Western Michigan	8	–	8	.500	15	–	14	.517
Ohio	8	–	8	.500	13	–	14	.481
Miami	8	–	8	.500	11	–	16	.407
Toledo	7	–	9	.438	15	–	11	.577
Kent State	6	–	10	.375	10	–	16	.385
Central Michigan	4	–	12	.250	10	–	16	.385
† 1982 MAC tournament winner Rankings from AP Poll

The 1981–82 Northern Illinois Huskies men's basketball team represented Northern Illinois University during the college basketball season of 1981–82. The team, led by head coach John McDougal, were members of the Mid American Conference (MAC) and played their homes game at the Chick Evans Field House. They finished the season 16–14, 9–7 in MAC play, to finish third in the regular season standings. The Huskies won the MAC tournament to receive an automatic bid to the 1982 NCAA tournament – the first tournament appearance in school history.

== Roster ==
1981–82 Northern Illinois Huskies men's basketball team
Players	Coaches
Pos. / # / Name / Height / Weight / Year / Hometown; C / 40 / Allen Rayhorn / 6 ft 9 in (2.06 m) / 202 lb (92 kg) / Sr / Rockford, Illinois	Head coach: John McDougal; Assistant coach(es) Legend: (C) Team captain; (S) Suspended; (I) Ineligible; (W) Walk-on; Injured; Current redshirt

== Schedule and results ==
Date time, TV	Rank^{#}	Opponent^{#}	Result	Record	Site city, state
Regular season
Nov 28, 1981*		at No. 9 Iowa	L 66–84	0–1	Iowa Field House; Iowa City, Iowa
Dec 12, 1981*		at Notre Dame	W 70–65	2–4	Joyce Center; Notre Dame, Indiana
Dec 30, 1981*		vs. No. 8 DePaul	L 46–55	3–6	
MAC Tournament
Mar 1, 1982*		Ohio; Quarterfinals	W 70–68	14–13	Chick Evans Fieldhouse; Dekalb, Illinois
Mar 2, 1982*		vs. Bowling Green State; Semifinals	W 67–66	15–13	Crisler Arena; Ann Arbor, Michigan
Mar 3, 1982*		vs. Ball State; Championship game	W 79–75	16–13	Crisler Arena; Ann Arbor, Michigan
NCAA Tournament
Mar 12, 1982*	(12 MW)	vs. (5 MW) Kansas State; First round	L 68–77	16–14	Reunion Arena; Dallas, Texas
*Non-conference game. ^{#}Rankings from AP poll. (#) Tournament seedings in parentheses. MW=Midwest.
