= Kevin O'Connor (basketball) =

American basketball executive

Kevin O'Connor (born c. 1947) is the former General Manager and a current Senior Basketball Advisor of the Utah Jazz. He took part in the drafting of Deron Williams in 2005. O'Connor said he learned how to develop character profiles on players from Jazz executive Scott Layden. O'Connor served as general manager from 1999 to 2012, and was succeeded by former San Antonio Spurs executive Dennis Lindsey.

O'Connor was born in the Bronx, and grew up in Staten Island, New York. He graduated from Monsignor Farrell High School in 1965 and is a member of its Hall of Fame. In 1969, he graduated from Belmont Abbey College, North Carolina, with a degree in economics and business. In his senior year, he captained the basketball team to a 21–5 record.

== Early career ==
Director of player personnel, Philadelphia 76ers (1997–99)
Regional scout Utah Jazz (1994–97)
Regional scout Nets (1990–94)
Regional scout Portland Trail Blazers
Regional scout Los Angeles Clippers
Assistant coach UCLA (1979–84)
Assistant coach Virginia Military Institute (1974–76)
Assistant coach Colorado (1976–79)
Assistant coach Virginia Tech (1972–74)
Served in U.S. Army (1969–71)
