= 1981–82 Cincinnati Bearcats men's basketball team =

American college basketball season

1981–82 Cincinnati Bearcats men's basketball
- Conference: Metro Conference (1975–1995)
- Record: 15–12 (4–8 Metro)
- Head coach: Ed Badger
- Home arena: Riverfront Coliseum

1981–82 Metro Conference men's basketball standings
	Conf.				Overall
Team	W		L	PCT	W		L	PCT
No. 9 Memphis State †	10	–	2	.833	23	–	4	.852
No. 20 Louisville	8	–	4	.667	23	–	10	.697
Tulane	8	–	4	.667	19	–	9	.679
Virginia Tech	7	–	5	.583	20	–	11	.645
Cincinnati	4	–	8	.333	15	–	12	.556
Florida State	4	–	8	.333	11	–	17	.393
Saint Louis	1	–	11	.083	6	–	21	.222
† 1982 Metro Conference tournament winner Rankings from AP Poll; *Memphis State vacated NCAA Tournament games due to NCAA sanctions. Disputed record (24–5)

The 1981–82 Cincinnati Bearcats men's basketball team represented the University of Cincinnati during the 1981–82 NCAA Division I men's basketball season. The Bearcats were led by head coach Ed Badger, as members of the Metro Conference.

== Schedule ==
Date time, TV	Rank^{#}	Opponent^{#}	Result	Record	Site city, state
November 28*		Bellarmine	W 85–72	1–0	Riverfront Coliseum; Cincinnati, Ohio
November 30*		Northern Kentucky	W 50–42	2–0	Riverfront Coliseum; Cincinnati, Ohio
December 4*		vs. Pepperdine	W 73–72	3–0	
December 5*		at Wichita State	L 67–87	3–1	Charles Koch Arena; Wichita, Kansas
December 12*		at Michigan State	W 56–45	4–1	Jenison Field House; East Lansing, Michigan
December 16*		Duquesne	W 79–60	5–1	Riverfront Coliseum; Cincinnati, Ohio
December 19*		Miami (OH)	W 69–62	6–1	Riverfront Coliseum; Cincinnati, Ohio
December 21*		at Bradley	W 75–73 ^{7OT}	7–1	Robertson Memorial Field House
December 28*		Colorado	W 87–76	8–1	Riverfront Coliseum; Cincinnati, Ohio
January 4		Tulane	L 58–60	8–2 (0–1)	Riverfront Coliseum; Cincinnati, Ohio
January 6*		at Dayton	W 77–73	9–2 (0–1)	UD Arena; Dayton, Ohio
January 9*		Cleveland State	W 68–64	10–2 (0–1)	Riverfront Coliseum; Cincinnati, Ohio
January 13		at Memphis State	L 75–107	10–3 (0–2)	Mid-South Coliseum; Memphis, Tennessee
January 16		at Louisville	L 56–74	10–4 (0–3)	Freedom Hall; Louisville, Kentucky
January 18*		Loyola (IL)	W 83–72	11–4 (0–3)	Riverfront Coliseum; Cincinnati, Ohio
January 23		Memphis	L 75–107	11–5 (0–4)	Riverfront Coliseum; Cincinnati, Ohio
January 27*		Xavier	L 51–53	11–6 (0–4)	
January 30		Saint Louis	L 59–62	11–7 (0–5)	Riverfront Coliseum; Cincinnati, Ohio
January 31		at Virginia Tech	L 64–76	11–8 (0–6)	Cassell Coliseum; Blacksburg, Virginia
February 6*		at Boston University	L 50–52	11–9 (0–6)	Case Gym; Boston, Massachusetts
February 8		at Tulane	L 39–53	11–10 (0–7)	Avron B. Fogelman Arena; New Orleans, Louisiana
February 13		Louisville	L 53–67	11–11 (0–8)	Riverfront Coliseum; Cincinnati, Ohio
February 15		Virginia Tech	W 87–81	12–11 (1–8)	Riverfront Coliseum; Cincinnati, Ohio
February 20		Florida State	W 84–83	13–11 (2–8)	Riverfront Coliseum; Cincinnati, Ohio
February 25		at Saint Louis	W 76–61	14–11 (3–8)	St. Louis Arena; St. Louis, Missouri
February 27		at Florida State	W 73–71	15–11 (4–8)	Tallahassee-Leon County Civic Center; Tallahassee, Florida
Metro Tournament
March 4	(5)	vs. (4) Virginia Tech; Quarterfinals	L 92–106	15–12 (4–8)	Mid-South Coliseum; Memphis, Tennessee
*Non-conference game. ^{#}Rankings from AP Poll. (#) Tournament seedings in parentheses. All times are in Eastern Time.
