= 1981–82 Washington State Cougars men's basketball team =

American college basketball season

1981–82 Washington State Cougars men's basketball
- Conference: Pacific-10
- Record: 16–14 (10–8 Pac-10)
- Head coach: George Raveling (10th season)
- Assistant coach: Len Stevens
- Home arena: Beasley Coliseum

1981–82 Pacific-10 Conference men's basketball standings
	Conf.				Overall
Team	W		L	PCT	W		L	PCT
No. 4 Oregon State	16	–	2	.889	25	–	5	.833
No. 19 UCLA	14	–	4	.778	21	–	6	.778
USC	13	–	5	.722	19	–	9	.679
Washington	11	–	7	.611	19	–	10	.655
Washington State	10	–	8	.556	16	–	14	.533
California	8	–	10	.444	14	–	13	.519
Arizona State	8	–	10	.444	13	–	14	.481
Oregon	4	–	14	.222	9	–	18	.333
Arizona	4	–	14	.222	9	–	18	.333
Stanford	2	–	16	.111	7	–	20	.259
As of April 15, 1982; Rankings from AP Poll

The 1981–82 Washington State Cougars men's basketball team represented Washington State University for the 1981–82 NCAA Division I men's basketball season. Led by tenth-year head coach George Raveling, the Cougars were members of the Pacific-10 Conference and played their home games on campus at Beasley Coliseum in Pullman, Washington.

The Cougars were 16–14 overall in the regular season and 10–8 in conference play, fifth in the standings. There was no conference tournament yet, which debuted five years later.

Washington State hosted the first two rounds in the West regional of the 48-team NCAA tournament at Beasley Coliseum. The highest seeds, conference champions #2 Oregon State and #3 Idaho, had both defeated WSU on the tartan court this season; they advanced and met in the Sweet Sixteen in Provo, Utah.
