= Dick Walters =

American former coach of the Evansville Purple Aces basketball team

Biographical details
- Born: 1946 or 1947 (age 78–79)

Coaching career (HC unless noted)
- 1971–1978: College of DuPage
- 1978–1985: Evansville

Head coaching record
- Overall: 114–87 (college); 202–56 (junior college)
- Tournaments: 0–1 (NCAA Division I)

Accomplishments and honors

Championships
- MCC regular season (1982); MCC tournament (1982)

Dick Walters (born 1946/1947) is an American former college basketball coach. He coached the Evansville Purple Aces men's basketball team from 1978 to 1985. Walters was hired after the entire 1977–78 Evansville team perished in a plane crash during the season in December 1977.

Walters is a graduate of Illinois State University and achieved a record of 202–56 in the junior college ranks at the College of DuPage prior to accepting the Evansville Purple Aces men's basketball job.

Following the Purple Aces NCAA appearance in 1982, Walters interviewed for the University of Wisconsin–Madison head coaching position but chose to remain at Evansville with a new five-year contract.

== Head coaching record ==
=== College ===
Record table
Season	Team	Overall	Conference	Standing	Postseason
Evansville Purple Aces (NCAA Division I independent) (1978–1979)
1978–79	Evansville	13–16			
Evansville Purple Aces (Midwestern Collegiate Conference) (1979–1985)
1979–80	Evansville	18–10	1–4	5th	
1980–81	Evansville	19–9	6–5	T–4th	
1981–82	Evansville	23–6	10–2	1st	NCAA Division I First Round
1982–83	Evansville	13–16	6–8	T–5th	
1983–84	Evansville	15–14	7–7	T–4th	
1984–85	Evansville	13–16	4–10	6th	
Evansville:		114–87	34–36		
Total:		114–87			
National champion Postseason invitational champion Conference regular season champion Conference regular season and conference tournament champion Division regular season champion Division regular season and conference tournament champion Conference tournament champion
