= 1981–82 Louisville Cardinals men's basketball team =

American college basketball season

1981–82 Louisville Cardinals men's basketball

NCAA Tournament Mideast Regional Champions

NCAA Men's Division I Tournament, Final Four
- Conference: Metro Conference (1975–1995)

Ranking
- Coaches: No. 20
- AP: No. 20
- Record: 23–10 (8–4 Metro)
- Head coach: Denny Crum (11th season)
- Assistant coaches: Jerry Jones; Wade Houston; Bobby Dotson
- Home arena: Freedom Hall

1981–82 Metro Conference men's basketball standings
	Conf.				Overall
Team	W		L	PCT	W		L	PCT
No. 9 Memphis State †	10	–	2	.833	23	–	4	.852
No. 20 Louisville	8	–	4	.667	23	–	10	.697
Tulane	8	–	4	.667	19	–	9	.679
Virginia Tech	7	–	5	.583	20	–	11	.645
Cincinnati	4	–	8	.333	15	–	12	.556
Florida State	4	–	8	.333	11	–	17	.393
Saint Louis	1	–	11	.083	6	–	21	.222
† 1982 Metro Conference tournament winner Rankings from AP Poll; *Memphis State vacated NCAA Tournament games due to NCAA sanctions. Disputed record (24–5)

The 1981–82 Louisville Cardinals men's basketball team represented the University of Louisville during the 1981-82 NCAA Division I men's basketball season, Louisville's 69th season of intercollegiate competition. The Cardinals competed in the Metro Conference and were coached by Denny Crum, who was in his eleventh season. The team played its home games at Freedom Hall.

Louisville defeated Alabama Birmingham 75–68 to win the NCAA tournament Mideast Regional and advance to the Final Four (their 5th) where they fell to eventual runner-up Georgetown 50–46. The Cardinals finished with a 23–10 (8–4) record.

== Roster ==
1981–82 Louisville Cardinals men's basketball team
Players
Coaches

Pos.	#	Name	Height	Weight	Year	Hometown
F/C	41	Wiley Brown	6 ft 8 in (2.03 m)	220 lb (100 kg)	Sr	Sylvester, Georgia
G	14	Greg Deuser	6 ft 0 in (1.83 m)	175 lb (79 kg)	Sr	New Albany, Indiana
G	5	Jerry Eaves	6 ft 4 in (1.93 m)	180 lb (82 kg)	Sr	Louisville, Kentucky
F	30	Manuel Forrest	6 ft 7 in (2.01 m)	200 lb (91 kg)	Fr	Louisville, Kentucky
G	4	Lancaster Gordon	6 ft 3 in (1.91 m)	185 lb (84 kg)	Fr	Jackson, Mississippi
G	25	James Jeter	6 ft 2 in (1.88 m)	160 lb (73 kg)	Fr	Louisville, Kentucky
C	33	Charles Jones	6 ft 8 in (2.03 m)	215 lb (98 kg)	So	Scooba, Mississippi
G/F	12	Kent Jones	6 ft 2 in (1.88 m)	182 lb (83 kg)	Fr	Scooba, Mississippi
F/C	22	Rodney McCray	6 ft 7 in (2.01 m)	220 lb (100 kg)	Jr	Mount Vernon, New York
F/C	21	Scooter McCray	6 ft 9 in (2.06 m)	215 lb (98 kg)	Jr	Mount Vernon, New York
G/F	45	Danny Mitchell	6 ft 6 in (1.98 m)	185 lb (84 kg)	Fr	Eckerty, Indiana
C	40	Marty Pulliam	6 ft 9 in (2.06 m)	225 lb (102 kg)	Sr	Harrodsburg, Kentucky
F	43	Derek Smith	6 ft 6 in (1.98 m)	205 lb (93 kg)	So	Hogansville, Georgia
G	20	Milt Wagner	6 ft 5 in (1.96 m)	185 lb (84 kg)	Fr	Camden, New Jersey
G/F	44	Poncho Wright	6 ft 5 in (1.96 m)	195 lb (88 kg)	Sr	Indianapolis, Indiana

Head coach

- Denny Crum (UCLA)

Assistant coach(es)

- Jerry Jones (Valparaiso)
- Wade Houston (Louisville)
- Bobby Dotson (Western Kentucky)

Legend

- (C) Team captain
- (S) Suspended
- (I) Ineligible
- (W) Walk-on
- Injured
- Current redshirt

== NCAA tournament ==
=== Mideast region ===
First round
8	Southwest Louisiana	57
9	Tennessee	61
5	Indiana	94
12	Robert Morris	62
6	Kentucky	44
11	Middle Tennessee State	50
7	N.C. State	51
10	Tennessee-Chattanooga	58

Second round
9	Tennessee	51
1	Virginia	54
4	UAB	80
5	Indiana	70
11	Middle Tennessee State	56
3	Louisville	81
2	Minnesota	62
10	Tennessee-Chattanooga	61

Regional semifinals
1	Virginia	66
4	UAB	68
3	Louisville	67
2	Minnesota	61

Regional finals
4	UAB	68
3	Louisville	75

=== Final four ===
National semifinals
E1	North Carolina	68
MW6	Houston	63
ME3	Louisville	46
W1	Georgetown	50

National championship game
E1	North Carolina	63
W1	Georgetown	62
