= Matt Doherty (basketball) =

American basketball coach (born 1962)

Biographical details
- Born: February 25, 1962 (age 64); East Meadow, New York, U.S.

Playing career
- 1980–1984: North Carolina
- Position: Small forward

Coaching career (HC unless noted)
- 1989–1992: Davidson (assistant)
- 1992–1999: Kansas (assistant)
- 1999–2000: Notre Dame
- 2000–2003: North Carolina
- 2005–2006: Florida Atlantic
- 2006–2012: SMU

Administrative career (AD unless noted)
- 2017–2019: Atlantic 10 (assoc. commish.)

Head coaching record
- Overall: 170–180
- Tournaments: 1–1 (NCAA Division I); 6–2 (NIT); 3–1 (CIT)

Accomplishments and honors

Championships
- As player: NCAA champion (1982); As coach: ACC regular season (2001)

Awards
- AP Coach of the Year (2001)

Matthew Francis Doherty (born February 25, 1962) is an American former college basketball coach best known for his time as head coach of the University of North Carolina Tar Heels men's basketball team. Prior to accepting the head coaching position at UNC, he spent one season as head coach of the University of Notre Dame Fighting Irish men's basketball program.

As a college player, Doherty started on the 1981–82 North Carolina Tar Heels men's basketball team, which on March 29, 1982, won the NCAA Division I men's basketball tournament, defeating the University of Georgetown Hoyas men's basketball team by a score of 63–62. At UNC, Doherty played under the legendary college coach Dean Smith, and started alongside future National Basketball Association stars James Worthy, Sam Perkins, Kenny Smith, Brad Daugherty and Michael Jordan.

Prior to being named the head coach at Notre Dame, Doherty served as an assistant coach first at Davidson, then at Kansas. After leaving UNC, Doherty would go on to become head coach of the Florida Atlantic Owls, and the SMU Mustangs.

Outside of coaching, Doherty has also served as a college basketball commentator and as an NBA scout. His broadcast roles have included serving as a color commentator for various high school and college programs including Davidson. Doherty was most recently the Atlantic 10 Conference's associate commissioner for men's college basketball, resigning in April, 2019. Doherty went on to his current role as an executive coach, keynote speaker and author of the book REBOUND: From Pain to Passion - Leadership Lessons Learned.

== Early years ==
Doherty was born in East Meadow, New York. In his teenage years, he went to high school at Holy Trinity DHS in Hicksville, New York. Bob McKillop was his coach during his first two years at Holy Trinity. Doherty was the first freshman to make the varsity team at Holy Trinity.

Doherty was on the 1980 Holy Trinity team that won the Class A New York state high school boys basketball championship.

While at Holy Trinity, Doherty was named to the second team of the Parade All-America Boys Basketball Team, in 1979. Doherty was also a McDonald's All-American, playing in the 1980 game.

In October 1979, Doherty committed to playing for the Tar Heels. Other schools tried to recruit Doherty before he could legally sign his letter of intent, but North Carolina basketball staffers checked on Doherty, calling and visiting him until he could sign his letter of intent.

== College career ==
=== Freshman season ===
Doherty was a reserve small forward during his freshman year. He played all but nine games in the first half of his freshman year because of a fractured left thumb. In the 28 games he played in his freshman year, Doherty had 67 assists and averaged six points and three rebounds per game. He played in the 1981 NCAA Division I Basketball Championship Game loss against Indiana.

=== Sophomore season ===
In the summer of 1981, Doherty played on the South team in the National Sports Festival.

Doherty didn't start during his freshman year in part because of Dean Smith's reluctance to start freshmen. By his sophomore year, Doherty was chosen as a starting forward. He appeared on the November 30, 1981 Sports Illustrated issue previewing the 1981–82 season, announcing that season's North Carolina team as the preseason number one team according to the AP Poll. Smith's other upperclassmen starters for that team--James Worthy, Sam Perkins, and Jimmy Black—also appeared on the cover with Smith. (Michael Jordan, one of Smith's few freshmen starters, was omitted from the cover because Smith didn't allow media coverage of freshmen players before they played their first game.)

Doherty made 71 of his 92 free throw attempts, converting .772 percent of his free throws; his free throw percentage was the best of any player on the 1981-82 team. He also had 105 assists and averaged 9.3 points and three rebounds per game. Doherty scored at crucial points of North Carolina's postseason; he made the three winning free-throws in North Carolina's victory against Virginia in the 1982 ACC men's basketball tournament, and he was one of the high scorers of the 1982 NCAA East Regional semifinal game against Alabama. He was also an ACC All-Tournament Second Team selection.

=== Junior season ===
Doherty led the 1982–83 team in assists, with 150. He averaged 10.5 points and 3.8 rebounds per game. Doherty was also named the team's most outstanding defensive player that season.

In the 1983 ACC men's basketball tournament quarterfinal against Clemson, Doherty scored 28 points, the most points he scored in an individual game during his college career. He made the ACC All-Tournament Second Team for the second consecutive year.

=== Senior season ===
Before his senior season, Doherty played on the 1983 United States Select team.

Doherty was a co-captain of the 1983–84 team, along with Perkins and Cecil Exum. Doherty was also the team's assist leader, with 124. He averaged 9.8 points and four rebounds per game.

In his last ACC Tournament in 1984, Doherty was named an All-ACC Tournament First Team selection. He also was on the ACC All-Academic team.

At North Carolina, Doherty was a four-year letterman. Doherty was the second person in ACC history to earn 1,000 points, 400 rebounds, and 400 assists over a collegiate career. In the four seasons Doherty played with North Carolina, the Tar Heels amassed a record of 117 wins and 21 losses and won the 1982 NCAA Division I men's basketball tournament.

Doherty was the 1984 recipient of the Jim Tatum Memorial Award, an award given by the Chancellor of the University of North Carolina at Chapel Hill that honors athletes who also participate in community activities.

Doherty graduated from UNC-Chapel Hill in 1984 with a degree in business administration.

== After college ==
After graduating from UNC-Chapel Hill, Doherty entered the 1984 NBA draft. He was drafted by the Cleveland Cavaliers in the sixth round, with the 119th overall pick. Doherty ended up being cut by the Cavaliers on September 25, 1984. Doherty never played in the NBA.

Doherty wanted nothing to do with basketball after getting cut. He worked as a bonds salesman on Wall Street for three years, but hated it. Doherty admitted to quitting his Wall Street job at the press conference held shortly after he was named head coach of Notre Dame.

Doherty moved to Charlotte, North Carolina, where he worked as an executive search consultant. Around the same time, Doherty did color commentary for North Carolina, Davidson, St. Francis (NY), and high schools in the Charlotte area.

== Assistant coaching career ==
Doherty started his coaching career with a Charlotte-based Amateur Athletic Union team, coaching alongside former multi-sport Tar Heel athlete Charles Waddell. Doherty coached Jeff McInnis before McInnis came to UNC-Chapel Hill.

In 1989, Doherty was hired as an assistant basketball coach at Davidson, where McKillop was the head coach. Doherty was an assistant coach at Davidson for three seasons.

In 1992, Doherty became an assistant coach at Kansas under Roy Williams, who had been an assistant to Smith during Doherty's years at North Carolina. Doherty was at Kansas for seven years. During Doherty's time at Kansas, the Jayhawks won four Big 8 and Big 12 titles and advanced to the NCAA Division I men's basketball tournament every year. Doherty was an active recruiter during his time at Kansas. Several of the players he coached there went on to play in the NBA, including, but not limited to, Paul Pierce, Drew Gooden, and Kirk Hinrich. Other Kansas players talked about how Doherty recruited them to the press. In an interview with the Lawrence Journal-World, T.J. Pugh mentioned that, on separate occasions, Doherty sent him a single match with the note "We think you and KU are a perfect match" as well as an air sickness bag with the note "We'll be sick if you don't pick Kansas" written on it. Raef LaFrentz, speaking to USA Today, mentioned Doherty drew him a cartoon called "Jayhawk Slammer," featuring a player dunking over several people.

== Coaching career ==
=== Notre Dame ===
On March 30, 1999, Doherty was named as the head coach of Notre Dame men's basketball, less than a month after John MacLeod resigned. Doherty had several offers to become a head coach, but at the advice of Roy Williams and Dean Smith he waited until he found a great fit and he felt Notre Dame was a great fit for an Irish Catholic kid from New York.

Doherty and his only Notre Dame team had hopes of reaching the 2000 NCAA Division I men's basketball tournament. But with a regular season record of 16–13 and a quarterfinal loss to Miami in the 2000 Big East men's basketball tournament, Doherty's Notre Dame team did not receive a bid for the NCAA tournament. Instead, they accepted an invitation to the 2000 National Invitation Tournament. Doherty's Notre Dame team reached the NIT finals, falling to Wake Forest. Doherty's Notre Dame team finished their season with a 22–15 record.

=== North Carolina ===
==== First season ====
Bill Guthridge decided to retire at the end of the 1999–2000 North Carolina basketball season, on June 30, 2000. North Carolina basketball staff interviewed Roy Williams for the head coaching job after Guthridge's retirement. Roy Williams was mistakenly named as head coach by the Herald-Sun of Durham, North Carolina, before he could decide on the North Carolina coaching job. Williams decided to stay at Kansas. Other coaches, including John Calipari, had interest in the coaching vacancy, but Guthridge and Smith insisted they were looking for a coach with ties to North Carolina's basketball program. George Karl, Larry Brown, Eddie Fogler, Jeff Lebo, and Randy Wiel, all North Carolina basketball alumni, applied for the vacancy. Karl, Brown, and Fogler later took their names out of consideration. Dick Baddour, then the athletic director of UNC-Chapel Hill, was set on hiring Doherty. Doherty was named head coach of North Carolina on July 11, 2000. Doherty decided to take the job after a phone call with Jordan earlier that day. Jordan told Doherty the North Carolina coaching job might go to someone who didn't play or coach at North Carolina.

Doherty asked if he could bring his own staff from Notre Dame with him to North Carolina, a request greenlighted by North Carolina's athletic director. Doherty brought his assistant coaches--Doug Wojcik, Fred Quartlebaum, and Bob MacKinnon—and his coordinator of basketball operations, David Cason, with him from Notre Dame. Doherty felt he was rewarding the loyalty of the people that worked with him at Notre Dame, and felt Smith would have done the same thing. Instead, Smith and North Carolina basketball staff at that time were upset Doherty replaced Guthridge's assistant coaches Phil Ford, Dave Hanners, and Pat Sullivan. Ford, Hanners, and Sullivan not only played for North Carolina (unlike Doherty's Notre Dame coaching staff), they were also involved in recruiting players prior to Doherty's arrival. Doherty later felt he was misled by North Carolina basketball staff. However, some coaches applauded Doherty for retaining his Notre Dame coaching staff when he became North Carolina's head coach. Two of Doherty's four administrative staff left only to work with Dean Smith and Bill Guthridge. Doherty ended up releasing another administrative staff member due to lack of loyalty. These moves created dissension with the program.

Doherty's first public appearance as North Carolina's head coach was at North Carolina's annual Midnight Madness event, then called "Midnight with Matt and the Tar Heels." Doherty received a standing ovation when he walked into Carmichael Auditorium in the team's warm-up clothing and shoes. He participated in some of the event's activities, including a three-point shooting contest and a 3 on 3 contest between the coaching staff and champions from UNC-Chapel Hill's intramural basketball teams.

Doherty's first season began with a game against Winthrop. Doherty also received a technical foul by marching on the court and stomping his feet, in an attempt to get his team's attention. Fans in attendance applauded Doherty's technical foul.

Doherty apologized for a loss against Kentucky. After the Kentucky loss, the Tar Heels went on an 18-game winning streak. During this streak, the Tar Heels won the 2000 Hardee's Tournament of Champions, held in the Charlotte Coliseum. Doherty, not pleased with the first half of the game against UMass, threw a chair in the Tar Heels' locker room at halftime. At a post-game press conference, Doherty said he needed to buy a new chair to replace the one he threw in the locker room.

Curry Kirkpatrick, covering Doherty for his February 12, 2001 column in ESPN The Magazine, included a quote Doherty made in a team huddle during the February 1, 2001 game against Duke in Durham, in which he mused that Duke had "the ugliest cheerleaders in the ACC." Doherty's comment did not spark outrage on Duke University's campus, but Doherty still issued an apology after the article came out.

Doherty received a technical foul during the March 4, 2001 game against Duke in Chapel Hill. Doherty motioned for crowd noise after receiving the technical foul.

Doherty's Tar Heels shared the 2000–01 ACC regular season title with Duke. Doherty was the first men's basketball coach to win a regular season championship title in the ACC in his first season. He was also the first coach to play for, and then coach, teams ranked number one in the AP Poll. After the regular season ended, Doherty was named the Associated Press's National Coach of the Year.

The Tar Heels made it to the final of the 2001 ACC men's basketball tournament, but lost in the final to Duke. Later, the Tar Heels won an at-large bid to the 2001 NCAA Division I men's basketball tournament, but were eliminated in the second round by Penn State. They finished their season with a 26–7 record. Michael Brooker, who was a fifth-year senior during Doherty's first year as North Carolina's head coach, blamed a collective feeling of hubris among the players as well as the players not listening to Doherty and his coaching staff for their losses toward the end of the season.

==== Second season ====
Doherty feared coaching his second season at North Carolina. Several of Doherty's best players from his first season were gone. The combination of the lack of depth and inexperienced freshmen in the back court resulted in the Tar Heels crumbling to a record of 8–20, the most losses in school history. It was North Carolina's first losing season since 1961–62, Smith's first year. They also suffered only their second losing record in ACC play at 4–12; the 12 losses were six more than they had previously suffered in conference play. They finished in a tie for seventh in conference play after never previously finishing worse than fourth (and 36 consecutive years of finishing no worse than third). They also missed postseason play altogether for the first time since 1967, including a then-record 27 straight appearances in the NCAA tournament.

The ACC Area Sports Journal published an article about Doherty after Boone's transfer. Sources close to the North Carolina basketball program, including then-current and former students, talked to the writer of the article, David Glenn, under anonymity. These sources felt Doherty could be a good coach, but Doherty's approach to his relationships between the players and himself needed to change. One source thought Doherty's coaching style wasn't constructive and his anger at various situations spilled over into his criticisms of players.

==== Third season ====
Doherty's third season started with the Tar Heels winning the 2002 Preseason NIT, defeating Roy Williams' Kansas in the process. Their five win run was the best start to a season since the 1998–99 season. After a game against Iona, Sean May broke his foot. Several losses, including a five-game losing streak, followed May's injury.

The regular season ended with North Carolina's first win over Duke since 2001. During the game, held in Chapel Hill, Doherty was involved in an altercation with Chris Collins, then an assistant coach for Duke.

Shortly after the regular season ended, the ACC Sports Journal published another piece by Glenn centered on continuing problems between Doherty and his players. A parent of a player cited in the piece did not trust Doherty and believed other players did not trust Doherty as well. The mother of David Noel told the Star-News Noel did not have problems with Doherty, but she heard other players were having problems with Doherty.

The Tar Heels accepted an invitation to the 2003 NIT. They lost in the quarterfinal to Georgetown. The Tar Heels finished their season with 19 wins and a then-second-most program high of 16 losses. (This record has been surpassed by the 17 losses from the 2009–10 season, and the 19 losses from the 2019–20 season.)

After the Georgetown loss, Baddour talked to the players and some parents. The meetings lasted five days. Reporters were stationed near the Smith Center for news about Doherty's future. In the meetings, six players told Baddour they were thinking about transferring. Baddour concluded he had no choice but to remove Doherty from his post.

On April 1, Doherty was told that he would not be allowed to return as head coach due to an irreparable rift with his players. A press conference was set for that day to announce his departure. Given the choice of resigning or being fired, Doherty chose to resign. The basketball staff had prepared announcements for a resignation or a firing, depending on Doherty's decision. While UNC basketball alumni were skeptical of Baddour's decision to give Doherty two options, Baddour convinced them Doherty's job prospects and financial situation would look better if Doherty was given the choice to resign. His resignation was announced at North Carolina's scheduled press conference. Doherty did not attend the press conference. His contract was bought out for $337,500.

In an interview with Jones Angell and Adam Lucas for the Carolina Insider podcast, Steve Kirshner, the senior associate athletic director of UNC Athletics, says he allowed the players to come to the press conference announcing Doherty's resignation. However, Kirshner didn't realize the players that attended the press conference were wearing street clothes until just before the press conference started. Kirshner felt the players’ clothing was misinterpreted in the press, sparking rumors the players had no respect for Doherty and forced him to resign.

The day after the resignation, Inside Carolina's Thad Williamson reported that UNC officials were very concerned about the lack of a respectful environment in the program. In part because of this, three scholarship players had transferred—an unusually high number for any college basketball program, especially for one of UNC's stature. Several more were threatening to leave if Doherty had been allowed to stay on. Doherty had reportedly been given a year to make things more harmonious if he wanted to keep his job.

Two days after his resignation, Doherty conducted an interview with Jay Bilas for ESPN. In the interview, Doherty stated his resignation was mishandled. Doherty claimed Baddour and his assistants failed to attend any of Doherty's practices. A spokesperson for UNC-Chapel Hill, speaking on behalf of Baddour, denied the claims. Jawad Williams defended Doherty after his resignation; he believed any collegiate basketball coach would have issues.

Doherty considered going back to Davidson to become an assistant coach again. Instead, he took the following year off, talking to Brown, Rick Carlisle, Don Nelson, Gregg Popovich, Tom Izzo, and Tommy Amaker about their coaching methods. He went to the Wharton School of Business and wrote a thesis about his professional and personal life. He also took classes at the Darden Graduate School of Business Administration and the Bell Leadership Institute in Chapel Hill. While attending business school, Doherty also wrote a column for Sporting News and did color commentary for ESPN, College Sports Television, and Carolinas Sports Entertainment Television. He also worked part-time as a scout for the New York Knicks.

==== Accusations by Rashad McCants ====
In an interview with ESPN, Rashad McCants claimed Doherty knew about fake classes that kept McCants eligible to play at North Carolina. Doherty denied the accusations on his Twitter account.

=== Florida Atlantic ===
Doherty was named head basketball coach of the Florida Atlantic Owls on April 18, 2005, taking over from Sidney Green, who was fired over a month earlier. Doherty was the fifth coach in FAU's history and the last coach to coach while FAU was in the Atlantic Sun Conference.

Hurricane Wilma damaged FAU Arena and forced Doherty's Owls team to practice at Bishop Moore High School and the Champions Sport Complex in Orlando, Florida. However, the Owls' season began on time, with a 74–78 loss to Colgate.

A one-hour reality show on Doherty's season with FAU, The Season: Florida Atlantic University, first aired on ESPN2 on January 30, 2006.

In Doherty's one year at FAU, the Owls achieved their best-ever conference record (14–6) and its third season winning record in school history.

While at FAU, Doherty appeared on the ESPNU show The U as a March Madness analyst.

=== SMU ===
After Jimmy Tubbs was fired for NCAA violations, the athletics department at Southern Methodist University began a search for Tubbs' replacement. The committee chose Doherty because of his recruiting abilities and his concern for his student athletes. Doherty was named head men's basketball coach at SMU on April 24, 2006.

While at SMU, Doherty held a lecture on his time as North Carolina's coach at the Cox School of Business, as a case study in business failure. He also assisted in fundraising and planning for Crum Basketball Center, a practice facility for the men's and women's basketball teams. The center opened in February 2008. Before Crum Basketball Center opened, Doherty held his practices in a church gym.

To generate interest in the basketball program, Doherty went to various fraternities and events on SMU's campus and hosted his weekly radio show at Ten Sports Grill in Downtown Dallas, off SMU's campus. He also started a blog, MustangHoopsBlog.com, which was hosted on SMU's athletics site. The idea to start the blog came from Mark Cuban.

Doherty's first year at SMU had some setbacks. He lost his best player, Bryan Hopkins, to eligibility. He had enough time to sign only one of his prospects, Cameron Spencer. However, later that season, Doherty achieved his one hundredth career victory as a coach with a win against Texas-Pan American. Doherty ended his first season at SMU with a 14–17 overall record and 11–3 non-conference record.

Doherty's fifth season with the Mustangs, in 2010–11, was his most successful season on the court. The Mustangs' 20–15 overall record was the first 20-win season the Mustangs had since 1999–2000. The Mustangs also accepted their first post-season bid in over a decade; they advanced to the semifinals of the 2011 CollegeInsider.com Postseason Tournament. They were defeated in the semifinals by eventual tournament champions Santa Clara.

After a 13–19 record set during the 2011–12 season, Doherty was fired from SMU on March 13, 2012. His overall record at SMU was 80–109. None of his SMU teams made it past the first rounds of the Conference USA men's basketball tournament. According to The Dallas Morning News, Doherty received $500,000 for the remaining year left on his contract. Doherty released a statement to the press, acknowledging he was let go because of his overall record at SMU.

== After coaching ==
Doherty was hired in October 2012 as a scout for the Indiana Pacers.

In 2013, Doherty called college basketball games for ESPNU and later appeared on Tournament Countdown: The Experts, part of ESPNU's post-season college basketball coverage.

In August 2017, Doherty was hired as the Atlantic 10 Conference's associate commissioner for men's basketball. He resigned in April 2019.

== Personal life ==
While Doherty was coaching at Davidson, he married Kelly Propst. They have two children, Tucker (born 1997) and Hattie (born 1999). Tucker played lacrosse at Bellarmine University and Hattie attended the University of North Carolina at Chapel Hill where she competed as a rower.

== Head coaching record ==
Record table
Season	Team	Overall	Conference	Standing	Postseason
Notre Dame Fighting Irish (Big East Conference) (1999–2000)
1999–00	Notre Dame	22–15	8–8	T–6th	NIT Runner-up
Notre Dame:		22–15 (.595)	8–8 (.500)		
North Carolina Tar Heels (Atlantic Coast Conference) (2000–2003)
2000–01	North Carolina	26–7	13–3	T–1st	NCAA Division I Second Round
2001–02	North Carolina	8–20	4–12	T–7th	
2002–03	North Carolina	19–16	6–10	T–6th	NIT quarterfinal
North Carolina:		53–43 (.552)	23–25 (.479)		
Florida Atlantic Owls (Atlantic Sun Conference) (2005–2006)
2005–06	Florida Atlantic	15–13	14–6	3rd	
Florida Atlantic:		15–13 (.536)	14–6 (.700)		
SMU Mustangs (Conference USA) (2006–2012)
2006–07	SMU	14–17	3–13	11th	
2007–08	SMU	10–20	4–12	11th	
2008–09	SMU	9–21	3–13	12th	
2009–10	SMU	14–17	7–9	7th	
2010–11	SMU	20–15	8–8	7th	CIT semifinal
2011–12	SMU	13–19	4–12	11th	
SMU:		80–109 (.423)	30–68 (.306)		
Total:		170–180 (.486)			
National champion Postseason invitational champion Conference regular season champion Conference regular season and conference tournament champion Division regular season champion Division regular season and conference tournament champion Conference tournament champion
