= 1982 NCAA Division I men's basketball championship game =

Men's college basketball tournament game

1982 NCAA Division I Men’s Basketball Tournament Championship Game
National championship game
| Georgetown Hoyas | North Carolina Tar Heels |
| Big East | ACC |
| (28–6) | (31–2) |
|---|---|
| 62 | 63 |
| Head coach: John Thompson | Head coach: Dean Smith |
- AP: 6
- Coaches: 7
- AP: 1
- Coaches: 1
| | 1st half | 2nd half | Total |
|---|---|---|---|
| Georgetown Hoyas | 32 | 30 | 62 |
| North Carolina Tar Heels | 31 | 32 | 63 |
- Date: March 29, 1982
- Venue: Louisiana Superdome, New Orleans, Louisiana
- MVP: James Worthy, North Carolina
- Favorite: North Carolina by 1.5
- Referees: John Dabrow, Bobby Dibler & Hank Nichols
- Attendance: 61,612

United States TV coverage
- Network: CBS
- Announcers: Gary Bender and Billy Packer
- Nielsen Ratings: 21.5

The 1982 NCAA Division I men's basketball championship game took place on Monday, March 29, between the North Carolina Tar Heels and Georgetown Hoyas at the Louisiana Superdome in New Orleans, Louisiana. The match-up was the final one of the forty-fourth consecutive NCAA tournament organized by the National Collegiate Athletic Association (NCAA) to crown a national champion for men's basketball at the Division I level.

Head coach John Thompson and the Georgetown Hoyas entered the game ranked sixth in the final AP Poll (released three weeks earlier), with an overall record of 28–6. The Hoyas were led by first-team All-American Eric Floyd and seven-foot (2.13 m) freshman Patrick Ewing. In the midst of a 15-game winning streak, the North Carolina Tar Heels entered the championship game at 31–2 after defeating the Houston Cougars in the national semifinal. The Dean Smith-led North Carolina Tar Heels were anchored by junior and first–team All-American James Worthy.

The game was televised by CBS across the United States, which attracted over 17 million viewers. Georgetown jumped out to an early 12–8 lead, with all eight of North Carolina's points coming from goaltending infractions by Ewing. The Hoyas entered halftime ahead 32–31. The teams traded the lead multiple times in the closing minutes of the second half. Following a turnover by Matt Doherty, Georgetown took the lead 62–61 courtesy of a jump shot from Floyd. During the ensuing possession, North Carolina freshman Michael Jordan hit a go-ahead basket with 15 seconds remaining to give the Tar Heels a one-point advantage.

The Tar Heels won their second NCAA men's basketball national championship, with their first coming in 1957. Worthy was named the Most Outstanding Player for his efforts throughout the tournament. After losing in his first three national title game appearances – something many had openly criticized him over – coach Smith won his first national championship as a head coach. Ewing helped lead the Hoyas back to the national title game in 1984 and 1985, where they won it all in 1984. Both talented freshmen, Ewing and Jordan, went on to become National Players of the Year before leaving college to play professional basketball.

== Background ==
=== Georgetown Hoyas ===
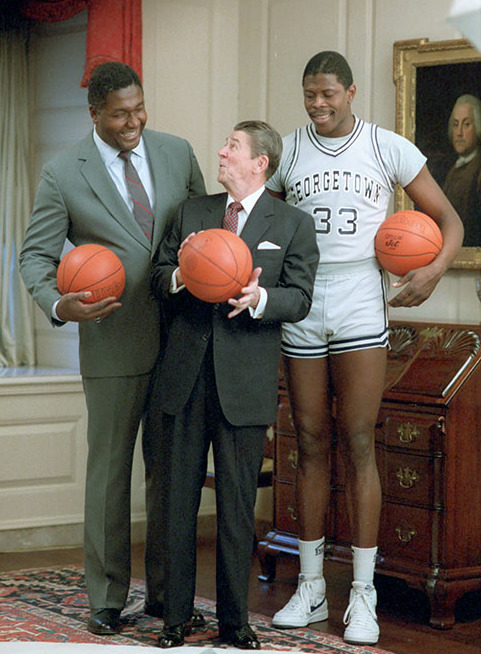
Georgetown coach John Thompson (left) managed to sign high-school basketball standout Patrick Ewing (right). Here, both pictured with President Ronald Reagan in November 1984

John Thompson was in the midst of his tenth season as head coach of the Georgetown Hoyas as the team entered the national championship game. Before the season, Thompson made headlines when he signed top recruit, Patrick Ewing over several other top name schools, along with Anthony Jones, Ralph Dalton, Elvado Smith, and Bill Martin. Georgetown was named by some voters as the number one team in the nation in the preseason polls due to its highly touted recruiting class. The Hoyas' starting lineup was Eric Smith, Eric Floyd, and Fred Brown as guards, Mike Hancock in the forward position, and Ewing at center.

The Georgetown Hoyas participated in the Great Alaska Shootout to start the 1981–82 season. The Hoyas lost their opening game to Southwestern Louisiana 70–61 after playing a sloppy game. After winning the following game against Alaska–Anchorage 77–67, the Hoyas lost 47–46 to Ohio State in their final tournament game. Georgetown then began a thirteen-game win streak, which was followed by losing three straight to three conference opponents. The Hoyas then finished the regular season with nine more wins and one loss, which was good enough to finish second in the Big East regular season standings. The Hoyas won their first two games of the Big East tournament by a collective margin of 29 points and advanced to the championship game against the Villanova Wildcats. The two teams were tied 33–33 at halftime, but the Hoyas changed their defense from zone to man-to-man to start the second half. This proved effective as they were able to force turnovers and shoot well from the field, which led them to win 72–54. The Georgetown Hoyas won the Big East tournament and also, a bid to the NCAA Tournament.

In the first round of the NCAA Tournament, Georgetown faced Wyoming and won 51–43. The Hoyas then beat the Fresno State Bulldogs by eighteen, after leading by five at halftime, to advance to the regional finals. Georgetown faced off against Oregon State in the regional final. In the game, the Hoyas shot very well from the field, setting the tournament record for field goal percentage in a game, 77.4%, en route to the 69–45 victory. In the national semifinal against Louisville, both teams shot very poorly. The two teams traded the lead several times throughout the first half, but after three minutes into the second half, Georgetown gained the lead and never relinquished it. The Hoyas used defense to maintain their lead and set the pace of the game, which they won 50–46. This was Georgetown's second appearance in the national championship game. They previously made it in 1943, where they lost to Wyoming.

=== North Carolina Tar Heels ===
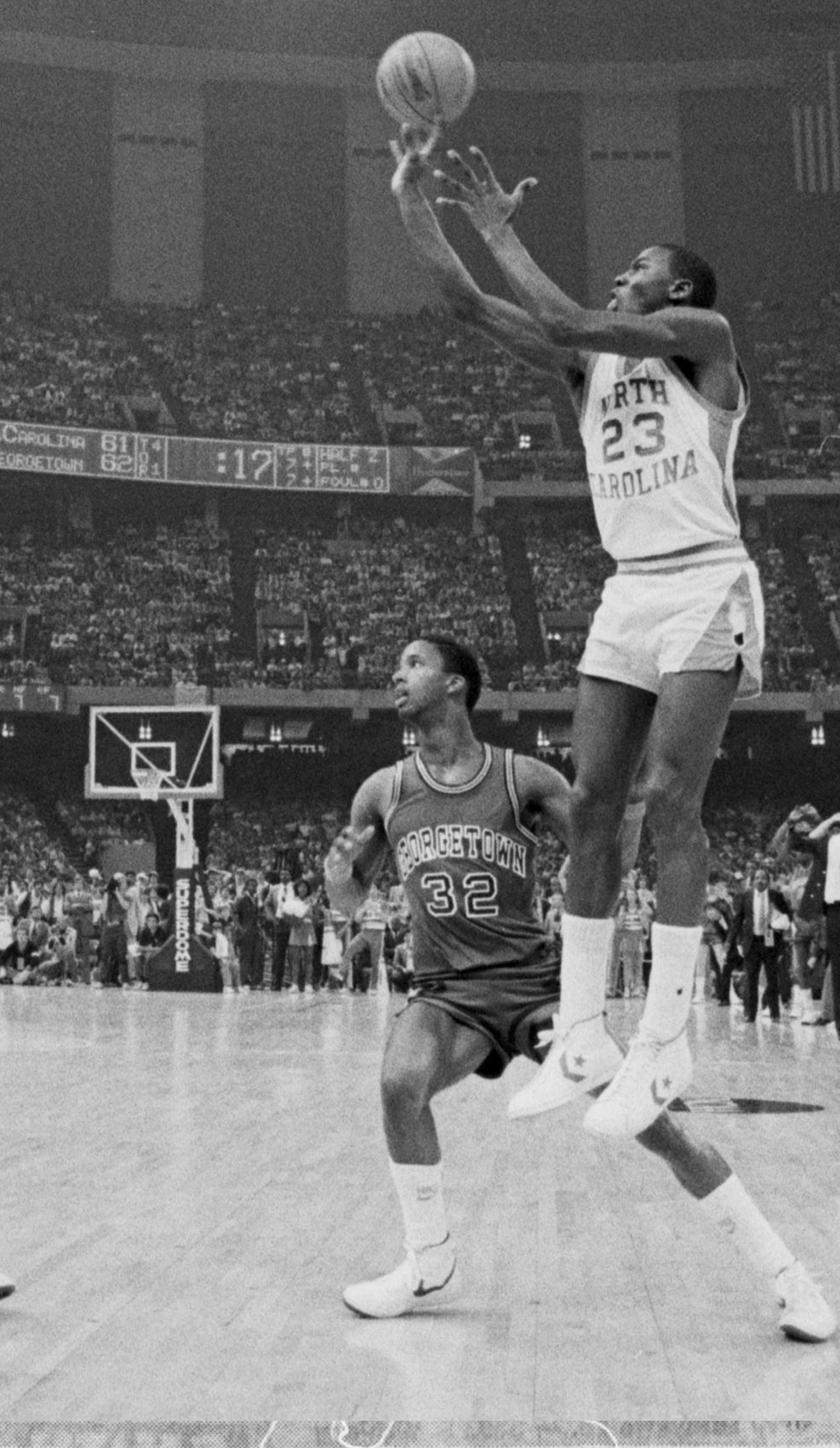
Jordan hitting the game winning shot over the University of Georgetown men's basketball team, led by Patrick Ewing, to win the game.

The North Carolina Tar Heels were coached by Dean Smith, who was in his twenty–first season as head coach of the Tar Heels. This was Smith's fourth national championship game appearance as the coach of North Carolina, after losing in 1968, 1977, and 1981. Coach Smith entered the 1981 regular season with what he called the "best class he ever had" to that point in his career with: Buzz Peterson, Warren Martin, Michael Jordan, Lynwood Robinson, and John Brownlee. His North Carolina team was named by many as the preseason number one and the favorite to win the national title. North Carolina's starting line up consisted of Jimmy Black and Jordan at the guard positions, Matt Doherty and James Worthy in at forward, and Sam Perkins as starting center.

North Carolina opened their 1981–82 campaign with a win against Kansas at a neutral site in Charlotte, North Carolina. After winning five more games, the Tar Heels entered the Cable Car Classic. Behind Perkins' 23 points, the Tar Heels managed to win the game, despite being taken to overtime. North Carolina advanced to the tournament final where the defeated Santa Clara. Wake Forest defeated North Carolina, who was playing without Perkins due to illness, to hand them their first loss of the season. The Tar Heels won three more games before losing to Virginia, where they trailed the whole game. North Carolina won the remaining games of its regular season. The team won the ACC tournament by narrowly defeating Virginia in tournament's championship game, 47–45.

North Carolina edged James Madison 52–50 in the first round of the NCAA Tournament. The Tar Heels beat Alabama in the succeeding round to advance to the regional final against Villanova. North Carolina advanced to the Final Four with a 70–60 over Villanova as each starter scored over ten points. In the national semifinal, North Carolina was pitted against Houston. The Tar Heels opened the game with a 14–0 run. Houston overcame the deficit and tied the game at 29 just a few minutes before the half. Coming out of halftime, North Carolina went on a 7–2 run and eventually won the game 68–63 after stalling for a significant period of time.

=== Team rosters ===
1981–82 Georgetown Hoyas roster
| No. | Name | Position | Height | Weight | Class |
|---|---|---|---|---|---|
| 10 | Kurt Kaull | G | 6-3 | 185 | Jr. |
| 11 | Anthony Jones | F | 6-6 | 185 | Fr. |
| 12 | Elvado Smith | G | 6-2 | 165 | Fr. |
| 20 | Fred Brown | G | 6-5 | 190 | So. |
| 21 | Eric Floyd | G | 6-3 | 170 | Sr. |
| 22 | Gene Smith | G | 6-2 | 190 | So. |
| 24 | Bill Martin | F | 6-7 | 190 | Fr. |
| 30 | Ron Blaylock | G | 6-3 | 185 | Sr. |
| 32 | Eric Smith | F | 6-5 | 185 | Sr. |
| 33 | Patrick Ewing | C | 7-0 | 220 | Fr. |
| 40 | Mike Hancock | F | 6-7 | 180 | Sr. |
| 42 | David Blue | F | 6-7 | 180 | Jr. |
| 50 | Ed Spriggs | F/C | 6-9 | 230 | Sr. |
| 52 | Ralph Dalton | F/C | 6-9 | 230 | Fr. |

1981–82 North Carolina Tar Heels roster
| No. | Name | Position | Height | Weight | Class |
|---|---|---|---|---|---|
| 4 | Lynwood Robinson | G | 6-1 | 176 | Fr. |
| 21 | Jimmy Black | G | 6-3 | 162 | Sr. |
| 22 | Buzz Peterson | G | 6-3½ | 165 | Fr. |
| 23 | Michael Jordan | G/F | 6-5 | 189 | Fr. |
| 24 | Jim Braddock | G | 6-2 | 171 | Jr. |
| 32 | John Brownlee | F/C | 6-10 | 215 | Fr. |
| 41 | Sam Perkins | F/C | 6-9 | 224 | So. |
| 43 | Jeb Barlow | F | 6-8 | 207 | Sr. |
| 44 | Matt Doherty | F | 6-8 | 210 | So. |
| 45 | Chris Brust | F/C | 6-9 | 231 | Sr. |
| 50 | Cecil Exum | F | 6-6 | 206 | So. |
| 51 | Timo Makkonen | C | 6-11½ | 202 | So. |
| 52 | James Worthy | F | 6-8 | 219 | Jr. |
| 54 | Warren Martin | C | 6-11 | 222 | Fr. |

=== Media coverage ===
In the days before the game was to be played there was significant coverage given to the two head coaches Smith and Thompson. The two had both served as coaches on the 1976 United States men's Olympic basketball team for the 1976 Summer Olympics in Montreal, Quebec, Canada. The two coaches first met in Washington D.C. while trying to recruit players from the same high school. Thompson was quoted saying that coach Smith "knows our philosophy and I know his philosophy." Smith talked of Thompson saying he was a personal friend of his and that he would maintain contact with him whether or not Thompson was still coaching.

The relationship between Georgetown's Floyd and North Carolina's Worthy also drew some attention from the media. The two players grew up in Gastonia, North Carolina together, where they went to the same church and competed in high school against each other. Worthy commented that his family lives around two to three miles away from Floyd's. It was noted that the two would likely not interact much while playing as they did not play the same position.

Both coaches told the media that they believed their respective teams should play far better than they did in the National semifinal games if they wanted to win the upcoming game. Coach Smith expressed concerns over Georgetown's shooting ability and feared that Floyd would come out shooting very well from the field. In addition, Smith noted that Ewing would play a large factor in the game because his defensive presence in the game limits second chance opportunities for Georgetown's opponents. Ken Rappoport of the Associated Press wrote of how North Carolina was a very disciplined team that takes only high-percentage shots.

== Venue ==
The Louisiana Superdome was chosen as the venue for the Final Four of the 1982 NCAA Division I men's basketball tournament. The Superdome was selected over Rupp Arena in Lexington, Kentucky. Throughout the 1970s, the NCAA had considered hosting the Final Four in a domed football stadium, and the 1982 Final Four was the first time the tournament was held in a domed football stadium since 1971, which was held in Houston's Astrodome.

== Route to the game ==
| Georgetown Hoyas (#1 West) | | Round | North Carolina Tar Heels (#1 East) |
|---|---|---|---|---|
| Opponent | Result | Regionals | Opponent | Result |
| Bye | | First round | Bye |
| #9 Wyoming Cowboys | Win 51–43 | Second round | #9 James Madison Dukes | Win 52–50 |
| #4 Fresno State Bulldogs | Win 58–40 | Regional semifinal | #4 Alabama Crimson Tide | Win 74–69 |
| #2 Oregon State Beavers | Win 69–45 | Regional final | #3 Villanova Wildcats | Win 70–60 |
| Opponent | Result | Final Four | Opponent | Result |
| Louisville Cardinals (Mideast #3) | Win 50–46 | National semifinal | Houston Cougars (#6 Midwest) | Win 68–63 |

== Broadcast ==
The national championship game was televised across the United States by CBS. CBS obtained the rights to broadcast the NCAA Tournament, after the tournament had been previously broadcast by NBC. A total of 17.52 million homes, 30% of the television audience, watched the game. The broadcast earned a 21.5 Nielsen Rating, the second highest for the NCAA national championship game at the time, after 1979.

== Starting lineups ==
| Georgetown | Position | North Carolina |
|---|---|---|
| Fred Brown | G | Michael Jordan |
| Eric Floyd | G | Jimmy Black |
| Eric Smith | F | Matt Doherty |
| Mike Hancock | F | † James Worthy |
| Pat Ewing | C | Sam Perkins |
† 1982 Consensus First Team All-American

== Game summary ==
The game began with a tip–off between Georgetown's Patrick Ewing and North Carolina's Sam Perkins, which was won by Georgetown. Ewing made the first shot of the game from the baseline. On defense, Ewing was called for goaltending four times to give North Carolina their first eight points. Georgetown coach John Thompson ordered Ewing to "make his presence known" on defense and to not worry about goaltending calls when attempting to block shots. North Carolina did not physically make a shot until 8:08 had passed, at which point the score was 12–10 in favor of Georgetown. Eric Floyd proceeded to score four consecutive baskets for the Hoyas, while Worthy made six shots for the Tar Heels to tie the score at 22–22. The score at halftime was 32–31 in favor of the Hoyas, with ten of North Carolina's points coming off five goaltending calls on Ewing.

Doherty in the double team, gives it back to Black with 20 seconds left to play. Goes back to Michael Jordan, jumper from out on the left – good! 63-62, 13, 12, 11, Georgetown with one timeout. Fred Brown looking – threw it away to Worthy! Worthy, 5 – the Tar Heels are going to win the national championship! (Color commentator Jim Heavner in the background: "Oh, Dean!") As the pass is intercepted by James Worthy!

— Woody Durham's radio call on the Tar Heel Sports Network during Jordan's game-winner and the subsequent possession

Bender: Doherty, to Black, the time eighteen...shot, Jordan! Michael Jordan! Packer: 14 seconds! Bender: Fred Brown... Packer: Look for Sleepy Floyd... Bender: Oh, he threw it to the wrong man, he threw it to Worthy! Packer: It's over! It's over! Bender: He's fouled by Eric Smith. Fred Brown, somehow or another, threw the ball into the hands of James Worthy!

— Gary Bender and Billy Packer's CBS call on Jordan's game-winner and the subsequent possession

The teams traded baskets for the majority of the second half, with the largest advantage being four points by Georgetown with over twelve minutes to go in the game. After five more minutes of game play, North Carolina managed to cut the lead to two, 56–54. The Tar Heels then obtained a single point lead with 5:50 to play and set up in their four corners offense, to run out the game clock. The Tar Heels were quickly fouled and Jimmy Black converted two free throws, while Fred Brown made two his own on the other end to bring the score to 59–58 in favor of North Carolina. With three and a half minutes left in the contest, Michael Jordan drove to the basket and made a shot off of the backboard to increase the Tar Heels' lead to three, 61–58. On Georgetown's following possession, Ewing made a jump shot to bring his team within one. North Carolina again set up in the four corners. While making an attempt to steal the ball from Matt Doherty, the Hoyas' Eric Smith was called for a foul. This sent Doherty to the line for a one-and-one, which he missed and Ewing got the rebound. Floyd then hit a twelve-foot jump shot with 57 seconds left to go to give Georgetown the lead, 62–61. Then, Jordan received a pass from Black and connected on a shot with fifteen seconds remaining in the game to give North Carolina a one-point lead on his famous game-winning shot. On the Hoyas' ensuing possession, Fred Brown mistakenly passed the ball away to Worthy, who proceeded to run out some of the clock before being fouled by Smith. Because the officials called an intentional foul, Worthy received two free throw attempts, both of which he missed. Floyd got the rebound and attempted a last second shot that also missed.

== Box score ==
CBS

March 29, 1982
8:12 pm EST

#W1 Georgetown Hoyas 62, #E1 North Carolina Tar Heels 63
Scoring by half: 32–31, 30–32
| Pts: Patrick Ewing 23; Rebs: Patrick Ewing 11; Asts: Fred Brown, Eric Floyd, Eric Smith 5 | Pts: James Worthy 28; Rebs: Michael Jordan 9 Asts: Jimmy Black 9 |

Louisiana Superdome, New Orleans, Louisiana
Attendance: 61,612
Referees: John Dabrow, Bobby Dibbler & Hank Nichols

Legend
| Pos | Position | FGM | Field goals made | FGA | Field goals attempted | FTM | Free throws made | FTA | Free throws attempted | Reb | Rebounds |
| Ast | Assists | Blk | Blocks | Stl | Steals | PF | Personal fouls | Pts | Points |

Georgetown Hoyas
| Player | Pos | FGM | FGA | FTM | FTA | Reb | Ast | Blk | Stl | PF | Pts |
| Fred Brown | G | 1 | 2 | 2 | 2 | 2 | 5 | 4 | 0 | 2 | 4 |
| Patrick Ewing | C | 10 | 15 | 3 | 3 | 11 | 1 | 4 | 2 | 3 | 23 |
| Eric Floyd | G | 9 | 17 | 0 | 0 | 3 | 5 | 2 | 0 | 4 | 18 |
| Mike Hancock | F/C | 0 | 2 | 0 | 0 | 0 | 0 | 1 | 0 | 0 | 0 |
| Tony Jones | F | 1 | 3 | 0 | 0 | 0 | 0 | 0 | 0 | 0 | 2 |
| Bill Martin | F | 0 | 2 | 0 | 0 | 0 | 0 | 1 | 0 | 0 | 0 |
| Eric Smith | G/F | 6 | 8 | 2 | 2 | 3 | 5 | 5 | 0 | 0 | 14 |
| Gene Smith | G | 0 | 0 | 0 | 0 | 0 | 0 | 1 | 0 | 0 | 0 |
| Ed Spriggs | C | 0 | 2 | 1 | 2 | 1 | 0 | 2 | 0 | 2 | 1 |
| Team totals | | 27 | 51 | 8 | 9 | 22 | 16 | 20 | 2 | 11 | 62 |

North Carolina Tar Heels
| Player | Pos | FGM | FGA | FTM | FTA | Reb | Ast | Blk | Stl | PF | Pts |
| Jimmy Black | G | 1 | 4 | 2 | 2 | 3 | 7 | 2 | 0 | 1 | 4 |
| Jim Braddock | G | 0 | 0 | 0 | 0 | 0 | 1 | 1 | 0 | 0 | 0 |
| Chris Brust | F/C | 0 | 0 | 1 | 2 | 1 | 1 | 1 | 0 | 0 | 1 |
| Matt Doherty | F | 1 | 3 | 2 | 3 | 3 | 1 | 0 | 0 | 0 | 4 |
| Michael Jordan | G | 7 | 13 | 2 | 2 | 9 | 2 | 2 | 0 | 2 | 16 |
| Sam Perkins | F/C | 3 | 7 | 4 | 6 | 7 | 1 | 2 | 1 | 0 | 10 |
| Buzz Peterson | G | 0 | 3 | 0 | 0 | 1 | 1 | 0 | 0 | 1 | 0 |
| James Worthy | F | 13 | 17 | 2 | 7 | 4 | 0 | 3 | 0 | 3 | 28 |
| Team totals | | 25 | 47 | 13 | 22 | 30 | 14 | 11 | 1 | 7 | 63 |

== Aftermath ==
His Airness. MJ. Air Jordan. Before Michael Jordan was any of these things, before he was the most recognizable athlete in the world, he was Mike Jordan, the freshman for North Carolina. Then he hit a game-winning shot in the 1982 national championship game, and Mike became Michael Jordan, who became all of the above.

— Powell Latimer in the Daily Tar Heel before Jordan's 2009 Hall of Fame induction

North Carolina's James Worthy was named the NCAA tournament's Most Outstanding Player for his performance during the course of the tournament. Along with that honor, Worthy and Eric Floyd were both named Consensus First–team All-Americans for the 1981–82 season, while Tar Heel Sam Perkins was a Consensus Second–team All-American. Despite losing the game, John Thompson was given the United States Basketball Writers Association's Coach of the Year.

Following the victory, Coach Smith received thousands of letters including the likes of boxer Sugar Ray Leonard and President of the United States Ronald Reagan, the latter of which invited the team to the White House. Smith's secretary Linda Woods told reporters that "[Smith] answers everything" and stated that they were "2,000 letters behind in our correspondance." The visit to the White House was declined as the travel fares were not included.

In the days leading up to the national championship game, North Carolina head coach Dean Smith was a focal point of the media over his record in national championship games. Smith had coached the North Carolina Tar Heels to six Final Fours and three national title games before the 1981–82 season, all of which resulted in the Tar Heels failing to win the tournament. Due to these losses, Smith had earned a reputation for not being able to win the "big game." When coach Smith won the national championship game against Georgetown, he silenced those who had criticized him before the game. Before retiring, coach Smith led the Tar Heels to one more national title victory in 1993.

The Georgetown Hoyas returned to the national championship game in 1984, where they faced off against the Houston Cougars and won 84–75. It was the first NCAA men's basketball national championship that Georgetown had won, along with the first that Thompson had won as head coach. Thompson embracing Brown in celebration after he ceremonially took each starter out of the game to give the bench players time in the championship game became an enduring image, as Thompson had had to console Brown after he had crucially thrown it away to Worthy in 1982. The following year, they again made it back to the national title game. This time, however, they lost to the eighth-seeded conference rival Villanova Wildcats.

The game featured two future National Players of the Year in Jordan and Ewing. The Sporting News named Jordan Player of the Year for the 1982–83 season. The following year, Jordan was the consensus National Player of the Year for the 1983–84 season, winning each of the player of the year awards that were given out. Ewing won four National Player of the Year awards for his efforts during the 1984–85 season. In addition, Worthy (2003), Ewing (2008), and Jordan (2009) were all enshrined in the Naismith Memorial Basketball Hall of Fame after illustrious NBA careers with the Los Angeles Lakers, New York Knicks and Chicago Bulls respectively including 9 NBA championships and were also all named to the NBA's 50 Greatest Players list in 1996 marking the league's 50th anniversary.
