= 1981–82 North Carolina Tar Heels men's basketball team =

American college basketball season

1981–82 North Carolina Tar Heels men's basketball

NCAA Tournament National Champion NCAA Division I regular season champions ACC tournament champions ACC regular season co-champions

National Championship Game, W 63–62 vs. Georgetown
- Conference: Atlantic Coast Conference

Ranking
- Coaches: No. 1
- AP: No. 1
- Record: 32–2 (12–2 ACC)
- Head coach: Dean Smith (21st season)
- Assistant coaches: Bill Guthridge (15th season); Eddie Fogler (11th season); Roy Williams (4th season)
- Home arena: Carmichael Auditorium

1981–82 ACC men's basketball standings
| | Conf. | | | | Overall |
| Team | W | | L | PCT | W | | L | PCT |
|---|---|---|---|---|---|---|---|---|
| No. 1 North Carolina † | 12 | – | 2 | .857 | 32 | – | 2 | .941 |
| No. 7 Virginia | 12 | – | 2 | .857 | 30 | – | 4 | .882 |
| No. 16 Wake Forest | 9 | – | 5 | .643 | 21 | – | 9 | .700 |
| No. 10 NC State | 7 | – | 7 | .500 | 22 | – | 10 | .688 |
| Maryland | 5 | – | 9 | .357 | 16 | – | 13 | .552 |
| Duke | 4 | – | 10 | .286 | 10 | – | 17 | .370 |
| Clemson | 4 | – | 10 | .286 | 14 | – | 14 | .500 |
| Georgia Tech | 3 | – | 11 | .214 | 10 | – | 16 | .385 |
† 1982 ACC tournament winner Rankings from AP poll

The 1981–82 North Carolina Tar Heels men's basketball team represented University of North Carolina. The team played its home games in Chapel Hill, North Carolina, and was a member of the Atlantic Coast Conference. Led by James Worthy, Sam Perkins, and freshman Michael Jordan, the Tar Heels won the National Championship. It was head coach Dean Smith's first title.

== Roster ==
1981–82 North Carolina Tar Heels men's basketball team
Players
Coaches

| Pos. | # | Name | Height | Weight | Year | Hometown |
|---|---|---|---|---|---|---|
| F | 43 | Jeb Barlow | 6 ft 8 in (2.03 m) | 206 lb (93 kg) | Sr | Fuquay-Varina, North Carolina |
| G | 21 | Jimmy Black | 6 ft 3 in (1.91 m) | 162 lb (73 kg) | Sr | Bronx, New York |
| G | 24 | Jim Braddock | 6 ft 2 in (1.88 m) | 171 lb (78 kg) | Jr | Chattanooga, Tennessee |
| F | 32 | John Brownlee | 6 ft 10 in (2.08 m) | 215 lb (98 kg) | Fr | Fort Worth, Texas |
| F | 45 | Chris Brust | 6 ft 9 in (2.06 m) | 231 lb (105 kg) | Sr | Babylon, New York |
| F | 44 | Matt Doherty | 6 ft 8 in (2.03 m) | 210 lb (95 kg) | So | East Meadow, New York |
| F | 50 | Cecil Exum | 6 ft 6 in (1.98 m) | 206 lb (93 kg) | So | Dudley, North Carolina |
| G | 23 | Michael Jordan | 6 ft 5 in (1.96 m) | 189 lb (86 kg) | Fr | Wilmington, North Carolina |
| C | 51 | Timo Makkonen | 6 ft 11 in (2.11 m) | 202 lb (92 kg) | So | Lahti, Finland |
| C | 54 | Warren Martin | 6 ft 11 in (2.11 m) | 220 lb (100 kg) | Fr | Axton, Virginia |
| C | 41 | Sam Perkins | 6 ft 9 in (2.06 m) | 224 lb (102 kg) | So | Latham, New York |
| G | 22 | Buzz Peterson | 6 ft 3 in (1.91 m) | 165 lb (75 kg) | Fr | Asheville, North Carolina |
| G | 4 | Lynwood Robinson | 6 ft 1 in (1.85 m) | 176 lb (80 kg) | Fr | Mount Olive, North Carolina |
| F | 52 | James Worthy | 6 ft 9 in (2.06 m) | 224 lb (102 kg) | Jr | Gastonia, North Carolina |

Head coach

- Dean Smith (Kansas)

Assistant coach(es)

- Bill Guthridge (Kansas State)
- Eddie Fogler (North Carolina)
- Roy Williams (North Carolina)

Legend

- (C) Team captain
- (S) Suspended
- (I) Ineligible
- (W) Walk-on
- Injured
- Current redshirt

== Player stats ==
| Player | Games | Minutes | Field goals | Three Pointers | Free Throws | Rebounds | Blocks | Steals | Assists | Points |
|---|---|---|---|---|---|---|---|---|---|---|
| James Worthy | 34 | 1178 | 203 | N/A | 126 | 215 | 8 | 52 | 82 | 532 |
| Michael Jordan | 34 | 1079 | 191 | N/A | 78 | 149 | 8 | 41 | 61 | 460 |
| Sam Perkins | 32 | 1141 | 174 | N/A | 109 | 250 | 53 | 33 | 35 | 457 |

== Schedule ==
| Date time, TV | Rank^{#} | Opponent^{#} | Result | Record | Site city, state |
Regular season
| November 28*; ESPN | No. 1 | vs. Kansas | W 74–67 | 1–0 | Charlotte Coliseum; Charlotte, NC |
| November 30* | No. 1 | vs. USC | W 73–62 | 2–0 | Greensboro Coliseum; Greensboro, NC |
| December 3* | No. 1 | No. 9 Tulsa | W 78–70 | 3–0 | Carmichael Auditorium; Chapel Hill, NC |
| December 12* | No. 1 | South Florida | W 75–39 | 4–0 | Carmichael Auditorium; Chapel Hill, NC |
| December 19* | No. 1 | vs. Rutgers | W 59–36 | 5–0 | Madison Square Garden; New York, NY |
| December 26*; NBC | No. 1 | vs. No. 2 Kentucky | W 82–69 | 6–0 | Brendan Byrne Arena; East Rutherford, NJ |
| December 28* | No. 1 | vs. Penn State; Cable Car Classic | W 56–50 ^{OT} | 7–0 | Toso Pavilion; Santa Clara, CA |
| December 29* | No. 1 | at Santa Clara | W 76–57 | 8–0 | Toso Pavilion; Santa Clara, CA |
| January 4* | No. 1 | William & Mary | W 64–40 | 9–0 | Carmichael Auditorium; Chapel Hill, NC |
| January 6 | No. 1 | Maryland | W 66–50 | 10–0 (1–0) | Cole Field House; College Park, MD |
| January 9 NBC | No. 1 | No. 2 Virginia | W 65–60 | 11–0 (2–0) | Carmichael Auditorium; Chapel Hill, NC |
| January 13 | No. 1 | No. 12 NC State; Rivalry | W 61–41 | 12–0 (3–0) | Reynolds Coliseum; Raleigh, NC |
| January 16 | No. 1 | Duke; Rivalry | W 73–63 | 13–0 (4–0) | Cameron Indoor Stadium; Durham, NC |
| January 21 | No. 1 | Wake Forest | L 48–55 | 13–1 (4–1) | Carmichael Auditorium; Chapel Hill, NC |
| January 23 | No. 1 | at Georgia Tech | W 66–54 | 14–1 (5–1) | Omni Coliseum; Atlanta, GA |
| January 27 | No. 2 | Clemson | W 77–72 | 15–1 (6–1) | Carmichael Auditorium; Chapel Hill, NC |
| January 30 | No. 2 | No. 17 NC State; Rivalry | W 58–44 | 16–1 (7–1) | Carmichael Auditorium; Chapel Hill, NC |
| February 3 | No. 2 | at No. 3 Virginia | L 58–74 | 16–2 (7–2) | University Hall; Charlottesville, VA |
| February 5* | No. 2 | vs. Furman; North-South Doubleheader | W 96–69 | 17–2 | Charlotte Coliseum; Charlotte, NC |
| February 6* | No. 2 | vs. The Citadel; North-South Doubleheader | W 67–46 | 18–2 | Charlotte Coliseum; Charlotte, NC |
| February 11 | No. 2 | Maryland | W 59–56 | 19–2 (8–2) | Carmichael Auditorium; Chapel Hill, NC |
| February 14* | No. 2 | vs. Georgia | W 66–57 | 20–2 | Greensboro Coliseum; Greensboro, NC |
| February 17 | No. 2 | at No. 14 Wake Forest | W 69–51 | 21–2 (9–2) | Greensboro Coliseum; Greensboro, NC |
| February 20 | No. 2 | at Clemson | W 55–49 | 22–2 (10–2) | Littlejohn Coliseum; Clemson, SC |
| February 24 | No. 2 | Georgia Tech | W 77–54 | 23–2 (11–2) | Carmichael Auditorium; Chapel Hill, NC |
| February 27 | No. 2 | Duke | W 84–66 | 24–2 (12–2) | Carmichael Auditorium; Chapel Hill, NC |
ACC tournament
| March 5* | (1) No. 1 | (8) Georgia Tech; Quarterfinals | W 55–39 | 25–2 | Greensboro Coliseum; Greensboro, NC |
| March 6* | (1) No. 1 | (4) NC State; Semifinals | W 58–46 | 26–2 | Greensboro Coliseum; Greensboro, NC |
| March 7* NBC | (1) No. 1 | (2) No. 3 Virginia; Championship | W 47–45 | 27–2 | Greensboro Coliseum; Greensboro, NC |
NCAA tournament
| March 13* no, CBS | (1 E) No. 1 | (9 E) James Madison; Second round | W 52–50 | 28–2 | Charlotte Coliseum (11,666); Charlotte, NC |
| March 19* | (1 E) No. 1 | (4 E) No. 13 Alabama; Sweet Sixteen | W 74–69 | 29–2 | Reynolds Coliseum; Raleigh, NC |
| March 21*; CBS | (1 E) No. 1 | (3 E) Villanova; Elite Eight | W 70–60 | 30–2 | Reynolds Coliseum; Raleigh, NC |
| March 27*; CBS | (1 E) No. 1 | (6 MW) Houston; Final Four | W 68–63 | 31–2 | Louisiana Superdome; New Orleans, LA |
| March 29*; CBS | (1 E) No. 1 | (1 W) No. 6 Georgetown; National Championship Game | W 63–62 | 32–2 | Louisiana Superdome; New Orleans, LA |
*Non-conference game. ^{#}Rankings from AP Poll. (#) Tournament seedings in parentheses. All times are in Eastern Time Rank in NCAA tournament indicates seed in the region, E-East region, M-Midwest region, W-West region.

== Awards and honors ==
- Michael Jordan, ACC Rookie of the Year
- James Worthy, NCAA basketball tournament Most Outstanding Player

== Team players drafted into the NBA ==
| Year | Round | Pick | Player | NBA club |
|---|---|---|---|---|
| 1982 | 1 | 1 | James Worthy | Los Angeles Lakers |
| 1982 | 3 | 59 | Jimmy Black | New Jersey Nets |
| 1982 | 6 | 131 | Chris Brust | Denver Nuggets |
| 1982 | 7 | 153 | Jeb Barlow | Denver Nuggets |
| 1983 | 5 | 107 | Jim Braddock | Denver Nuggets |
| 1984 | 1 | 3 | Michael Jordan | Chicago Bulls |
| 1984 | 1 | 4 | Sam Perkins | Dallas Mavericks |
| 1984 | 6 | 118 | Matt Doherty | Cleveland Cavaliers |
| 1984 | 9 | 194 | Cecil Exum | Denver Nuggets |
| 1985 | 7 | 147 | Buzz Peterson | Cleveland Cavaliers |
| 1986 | 4 | 78 | John Brownlee | Los Angeles Clippers |
| 1986 | 4 | 73 | Warren Martin | Cleveland Cavaliers |
