= 1981–82 Georgia Tech Yellow Jackets men's basketball team =

American college basketball season

1981–82 Georgia Tech Yellow Jackets men's basketball
- Conference: Atlantic Coast Conference
- Record: 10-16 (3-11 ACC)
- Head coach: Bobby Cremins (1st season)
- Assistant coaches: George Felton (1st season); Ben Jobe (1st season); Jimmy Hebron (1st season)
- Home arena: Alexander Memorial Coliseum

1981–82 ACC men's basketball standings
| | Conf. | | | | Overall |
| Team | W | | L | PCT | W | | L | PCT |
|---|---|---|---|---|---|---|---|---|
| No. 1 North Carolina † | 12 | – | 2 | .857 | 32 | – | 2 | .941 |
| No. 7 Virginia | 12 | – | 2 | .857 | 30 | – | 4 | .882 |
| No. 16 Wake Forest | 9 | – | 5 | .643 | 21 | – | 9 | .700 |
| No. 10 NC State | 7 | – | 7 | .500 | 22 | – | 10 | .688 |
| Maryland | 5 | – | 9 | .357 | 16 | – | 13 | .552 |
| Duke | 4 | – | 10 | .286 | 10 | – | 17 | .370 |
| Clemson | 4 | – | 10 | .286 | 14 | – | 14 | .500 |
| Georgia Tech | 3 | – | 11 | .214 | 10 | – | 16 | .385 |
† 1982 ACC tournament winner Rankings from AP poll

The 1981-82 Georgia Tech Yellow Jackets men's basketball team represented the Georgia Institute of Technology. Led by first-year head coach Bobby Cremins, the team finished the season with an overall record of 10-16 (3-11 ACC).

== Roster ==
1981–82 Georgia Tech Yellow Jackets men's basketball team
Players
Coaches

| Pos. | # | Name | Height | Weight | Year | Hometown |
|---|---|---|---|---|---|---|
| G | 22 | Scott Gardner | 6 ft 4 in (1.93 m) | 180 lb (82 kg) | Fr | Greenville, South Carolina |
| G | 20 | Brian Howard | 5 ft 10 in (1.78 m) | 160 lb (73 kg) | Fr | Rockville, Maryland |
| G | 44 | Stu Lyon | 6 ft 4 in (1.93 m) | 180 lb (82 kg) | Sr | Pittsburgh, Pennsylvania |
| C | 53 | Steve Neal | 7 ft 0 in (2.13 m) | 215 lb (98 kg) | RS Jr | Largo, Florida |
| G/F | 14 | Brook Steppe | 6 ft 5 in (1.96 m) | 195 lb (88 kg) | Sr |

Head coach

- Bobby Cremins (South Carolina)

Assistant coach(es)

Legend

- (C) Team captain
- (S) Suspended
- (I) Ineligible
- (W) Walk-on
- Injured
- Current redshirt
