= 1981–82 Duke Blue Devils men's basketball team =

American college basketball season

1981–82 Duke Blue Devils men's basketball
- Conference: Atlantic Coast Conference
- Record: 10–17 (4–10 ACC)
- Head coach: Mike Krzyzewski (2nd season)
- Assistant coach: Chuck Swenson
- Home arena: Cameron Indoor Stadium

1981–82 ACC men's basketball standings
| | Conf. | | | | Overall |
| Team | W | | L | PCT | W | | L | PCT |
|---|---|---|---|---|---|---|---|---|
| No. 1 North Carolina † | 12 | – | 2 | .857 | 32 | – | 2 | .941 |
| No. 7 Virginia | 12 | – | 2 | .857 | 30 | – | 4 | .882 |
| No. 16 Wake Forest | 9 | – | 5 | .643 | 21 | – | 9 | .700 |
| No. 10 NC State | 7 | – | 7 | .500 | 22 | – | 10 | .688 |
| Maryland | 5 | – | 9 | .357 | 16 | – | 13 | .552 |
| Duke | 4 | – | 10 | .286 | 10 | – | 17 | .370 |
| Clemson | 4 | – | 10 | .286 | 14 | – | 14 | .500 |
| Georgia Tech | 3 | – | 11 | .214 | 10 | – | 16 | .385 |
† 1982 ACC tournament winner Rankings from AP poll

The 1981–82 Duke Blue Devils men's basketball team represented Duke University. The team's head coach was Mike Krzyzewski and the team finished the season with an overall record of 10–17 and did not qualify for the NCAA tournament.

== Schedule ==
| Date time, TV | Rank^{#} | Opponent^{#} | Result | Record | Site city, state |
|---|---|---|---|---|---|
| November 28, 1981* | | Vanderbilt | L 75–76 ^{2OT} | 0–1 | Cameron Indoor Stadium; Durham, N.C. |
| December 2, 1981* | | La Salle | W 61–55 | 1–1 | Cameron Indoor Stadium; Durham, N.C. |
| December 5, 1981* | | Appalachian State | L 70–75 | 1–2 | Cameron Indoor Stadium; Durham, N.C. |
| December 9, 1981 | | at No. 5 Virginia | L 83–92 | 1–3 (0–1) | University Hall (9,000); Charlottesville, VA |
| December 12, 1981* | | at Princeton | L 55–72 | 1–4 | |
| December 22, 1981* | | East Carolina | W 70–57 | 2–4 | Cameron Indoor Stadium; Durham, N.C. |
| December 29, 1981* | | Davidson; Iron Duke Classic | L 73–75 | 2–5 | Cameron Indoor Stadium; Durham, N.C. |
| December 30, 1981* | | Auburn; Iron Duke Classic | W 72–71 | 3–5 | Cameron Indoor Stadium; Durham, N.C. |
| January 2, 1982* | | at No. 14 Louisville | L 61–99 | 3–6 | Freedom Hall; Louisville, KY |
| January 6, 1982* | | Rutgers | W 80–61 | 4–6 | Cameron Indoor Stadium; Durham, N.C. |
| January 9, 1982 | | Maryland | L 36–40 | 4–7 | Cameron Indoor Stadium; Durham, N.C. |
| January 13, 1982 | | at Wake Forest | L 48–58 | 4–8 | Greensboro Coliseum; Greensboro, N.C. |
| January 16, 1982 | | No. 1 North Carolina; Rivalry | L 63–73 | 4–9 | Cameron Indoor Stadium; Durham, N.C. |
| January 20, 1982 | | No. 14 NC State | W 49–48 | 5–9 | Cameron Indoor Stadium; Durham, N.C. |
| January 23, 1982 | | at Clemson | W 50–44 | 6–9 | Littlejohn Coliseum; Clemson, SC |
| January 27, 1982* | | vs. Holy Cross | W 66–60 | 7–9 | Brendan Byrne Arena; East Rutherford, N.J. |
| January 30, 1982 | | No. 3 Virginia | L 65–77 | 7–10 | Cameron Indoor Stadium (8,564); Durham, N.C. |
| February 3, 1982 | | Georgia Tech | W 47–46 | 8–10 | Cameron Indoor Stadium; Durham, N.C. |
| February 6, 1982 | | at Maryland | L 60–77 | 8–11 | Cole Field House; College Park, MD |
| February 8, 1982* | | UNC Wilmington | W 67–57 ^{1OT} | 9–11 | Cameron Indoor Stadium; Durham, N.C. |
| February 10, 1982* | | at Stetson | L 81–88 | 9–12 | |
| February 13, 1982 | | No. 16 Wake Forest | L 71–86 | 9–13 | Cameron Indoor Stadium; Durham, N.C. |
| February 16, 1982 | | at NC State | L 56–72 | 9–14 | Reynolds Coliseum; Raleigh, NC |
| February 20, 1982 | | at Georgia Tech | L 78–87 | 9–15 | Alexander Memorial Coliseum; Atlanta, GA |
| February 24, 1982 | | Clemson | W 73–72 ^{3OT} | 10–15 | Cameron Indoor Stadium; Durham, N.C. |
| February 27, 1982 | | at No. 2 North Carolina | L 66–84 | 10–16 | Carmichael Auditorium; Chapel Hill, NC |
| March 5, 1982 | | vs. No. 16 Wake Forest; ACC tournament | L 53–88 | 10–17 | Greensboro Coliseum; Greensboro, N.C. |
*Non-conference game. ^{#}Rankings from AP Poll. (#) Tournament seedings in parentheses. Source: Duke media guide
