= 1982 ACC men's basketball tournament =

- Classification: Division I
- Season: 1981–82
- Teams: 8
- Site: Greensboro Coliseum; Greensboro, North Carolina
- Champions: North Carolina (10th title)
- Winning coach: Dean Smith (9th title)
- MVP: James Worthy (North Carolina)
- Television: Metrosports, NBC (Championship Game)

1981–82 ACC men's basketball standings
	Conf.				Overall
Team	W		L	PCT	W		L	PCT
No. 1 North Carolina †	12	–	2	.857	32	–	2	.941
No. 7 Virginia	12	–	2	.857	30	–	4	.882
No. 16 Wake Forest	9	–	5	.643	21	–	9	.700
No. 10 NC State	7	–	7	.500	22	–	10	.688
Maryland	5	–	9	.357	16	–	13	.552
Duke	4	–	10	.286	10	–	17	.370
Clemson	4	–	10	.286	14	–	14	.500
Georgia Tech	3	–	11	.214	10	–	16	.385
† 1982 ACC tournament winner Rankings from AP poll

The 1982 Atlantic Coast Conference men's basketball tournament was held in Greensboro, North Carolina, at the Greensboro Coliseum from March 5–7. North Carolina defeated Virginia, 47–45, to win the championship. James Worthy of North Carolina was named the tournament MVP. Beginning with this tournament, the quarterfinals were played on Friday and the championship was held on Sunday. The finals continued to be held on Sunday until the 2015 tournament, which began with first-round games on Tuesday and ended with the final on Saturday night.

== Bracket ==
Quarterfinals; March 5
1	#1 North Carolina	55
8	Georgia Tech	39
4	NC State	40
5	Maryland	28
2	#3 Virginia	56
7	Clemson	54
3	#16 Wake Forest	88
6	Duke	53

Semifinals; March 6
1	#1 North Carolina	58
4	NC State	46
2	#3 Virginia	51^{OT}
3	#16 Wake Forest	49

Championship Game; March 7
1	#1 North Carolina	47
2	#3 Virginia	45
