= Timo Makkonen =

Finnish basketball player

Personal information
- Born: 25 June 1960 (age 65) Lahti, Finland
- Listed height: 6 ft 11 in (2.11 m)

Career information
- High school: Vance Academy (North Carolina), U.S.
- College: North Carolina (1980–1984)
- Position: Center

Career highlights
- NCAA champion (1982)

Timo Juhani Makkonen (born 25 June 1960) is a Finnish business man and former basketball player. Born in Finland, he played college basketball in the United States for the North Carolina Tar Heels where he won the NCAA championship in 1982.

== Early life ==
Makkonen grew up in Lahti, Finland, and started playing basketball at the age of 13 with Lahti NMKY. In 1978, he moved to the United States to attend Vance Academy at the behest of coach Al DePorter. During his senior season, he averaged 26 points and 14 rebounds, drawing the attention of numerous colleges.

== Basketball career ==
=== College career ===
After contemplating offers from Wake Forest and South Carolina, Makkonen chose the University of North Carolina at Chapel Hill. He redshirted his first year after coming down with mononucleosis which required him to be hospitalised two times. Over the next three seasons, Timo appeared in 41 games, all victories. In 1982, he won the NCAA championship with UNC.

=== National team career ===
Makkonen played for the Finland national U-18 team in 1978 and 1980. In August 1982, he played two games for the Finland senior national team against Saudi Arabia.

== Later life ==
Following his college career, Makkonen stepped away from basketball and went into business.
