= Carl Tacy =

American basketball coach (1932–2020)

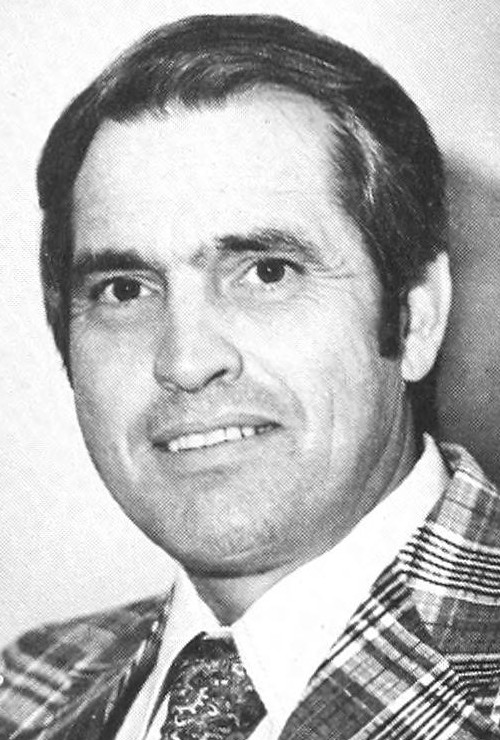
- Tacy, circa 1974

Biographical details
- Born: June 18, 1932; Huttonsville, West Virginia, U.S.
- Died: April 2, 2020 (aged 87); Winston-Salem, North Carolina, U.S.

Playing career
- 1951–1955: Davis & Elkins

Coaching career (HC unless noted)
- 1967–1970: Ferrum
- 1970–1971: Marshall (assistant)
- 1971–1972: Marshall
- 1972–1985: Wake Forest

Head coaching record
- Overall: 312–167 (.651)

Carl Tacy (June 18, 1932 – April 2, 2020) was a college basketball coach at Wake Forest University in North Carolina. He served as the head coach from 1972 to 1985 and compiled a 222–149 record, the second-most winning record at that time. Tacy's Demon Deacons defeated DePaul 73–71 in overtime in the NCAA Midwest Regional semifinals at St. Louis Arena on March 23, 1984 in the final game of Ray Meyer's coaching career. In 1985, he was inducted into the Wake Forest Hall of Fame. From 1971 to 1972, he served as the head basketball coach at Marshall University, where he compiled a 23–4 (.852) record.

== Head coaching record ==
Statistics overview
Season	Team	Overall	Conference	Standing	Postseason
Marshall Thundering Herd (Independent) (1971–1972)
1971–72	Marshall	23–4			NCAA University Division First Round
Marshall:		23–4 (.852)			
Wake Forest Demon Deacons (Atlantic Coast Conference) (1972–1985)
1972–73	Wake Forest	12–15	3–9	7th	
1973–74	Wake Forest	13–13	3–9	T–5th	
1974–75	Wake Forest	13–13	2–10	T–6th	
1975–76	Wake Forest	17–10	5–7	T–4th	
1976–77	Wake Forest	22–8	8–4	T–2nd	NCAA Division I Elite Eight
1977–78	Wake Forest	19–10	6–6	T–4th	
1978–79	Wake Forest	12–15	3–9	T–6th	
1979–80	Wake Forest	13–14	4–10	7th	
1980–81	Wake Forest	22–7	9–5	3rd	NCAA Division I Second Round
1981–82	Wake Forest	21–9	9–5	3rd	NCAA Division I Second Round
1982–83	Wake Forest	20–12	7–7	5th	NIT Semifinals
1983–84	Wake Forest	23–9	7–7	T–3rd	NCAA Division I Elite Eight
1984–85	Wake Forest	15–14	5–9	T–6th	NIT First Round
Wake Forest:		222–149 (.598)	71–97 (.423)		
Total:		245–153 (.616)			
