= 1981–82 Wake Forest Demon Deacons men's basketball team =

American college basketball season

1981–82 Wake Forest Demon Deacons men's basketball

NCAA tournament, Second round
- Conference: Atlantic Coast Conference
- Record: 21–9 (9–5 ACC)
- Head coach: Carl Tacy (10th season)
- Home arena: Winston-Salem Memorial Coliseum

1981–82 ACC men's basketball standings
	Conf.				Overall
Team	W		L	PCT	W		L	PCT
No. 1 North Carolina †	12	–	2	.857	32	–	2	.941
No. 7 Virginia	12	–	2	.857	30	–	4	.882
No. 16 Wake Forest	9	–	5	.643	21	–	9	.700
No. 10 NC State	7	–	7	.500	22	–	10	.688
Maryland	5	–	9	.357	16	–	13	.552
Duke	4	–	10	.286	10	–	17	.370
Clemson	4	–	10	.286	14	–	14	.500
Georgia Tech	3	–	11	.214	10	–	16	.385
† 1982 ACC tournament winner Rankings from AP poll

The 1981–82 Wake Forest Demon Deacons men's basketball team represented Wake Forest University as a member of the Atlantic Coast Conference during the 1981–82 NCAA Division I men's basketball season. Led by head coach Carl Tacy, the team finished the season with an overall record of 21–9 (9–5 ACC) and received a bid to the NCAA tournament.

== Roster ==
1981–82 Wake Forest Demon Deacons men's basketball team
Players
Coaches

Pos.	#	Name	Height	Weight	Year	Hometown
G	12	Danny Young	6 ft 3 in (1.91 m)	170 lb (77 kg)	Jr	Raleigh, North Carolina
G	15	Delaney Rudd	6 ft 2 in (1.88 m)	175 lb (79 kg)	Fr	Hollister, North Carolina
G	35	Guy Morgan	6 ft 8 in (2.03 m)	—	Sr	Virginia Beach, Virginia
F	54	Jim Johnstone	6 ft 11 in (2.11 m)	—	Sr
C	55	Anthony Teachey	6 ft 9 in (2.06 m)	210 lb (95 kg)	So	Goldsboro, North Carolina

Head coach

- Carl Tacy (Davis & Elkins)

Assistant coach(es)

Legend

- (C) Team captain
- (S) Suspended
- (I) Ineligible
- (W) Walk-on
- Injured
- Current redshirt

== Schedule and results ==
Date time, TV	Rank^{#}	Opponent^{#}	Result	Record	Site city, state
Regular Season
Nov 28, 1981*		at Richmond	L 61–64	0–1	Robins Center; Richmond, Virginia
Dec 12, 1981*		at Marquette	W 68–65	3–1	MECCA Arena (11,052); Milwaukee, Wisconsin
Dec 28, 1981*		vs. LSU; Sugar Bowl Tournament	L 64–70	5–2	New Orleans, Louisiana
Dec 29, 1981*		vs. Purdue; Sugar Bowl Tournament	W 76–68	6–2	New Orleans, Louisiana
Feb 27, 1982		at NC State	W 50–46	19–7 (9–5)	Reynolds Coliseum; Raleigh, North Carolina
ACC tournament
Mar 5, 1982*		vs. Duke; Quarterfinals	W 88–53	20–7	Greensboro Coliseum; Greensboro, North Carolina
Mar 6, 1982*		vs. No. 3 Virginia; Semifinals	L 49–51	20–8	Greensboro Coliseum; Greensboro, North Carolina
NCAA tournament
Mar 11, 1982*	No. 18	vs. Old Dominion; First round	W 74–57	21–8	Charlotte Coliseum; Charlotte, North Carolina
Mar 13, 1982*	No. 18	vs. No. 9 Memphis State; Second round	L 55–56	21–9	Charlotte Coliseum; Charlotte, North Carolina
*Non-conference game. ^{#}Rankings from AP Poll. (#) Tournament seedings in parentheses.
