= 1981–82 NC State Wolfpack men's basketball team =

American college basketball season

1981–82 NC State Wolfpack men's basketball

NCAA tournament, First Round
- Conference: Atlantic Coast Conference
- Record: 22–10 (7–7 ACC)
- Head coach: Jim Valvano (2nd season)
- Assistant coaches: Marty Fletcher (4th season); Ray Martin (2nd season); Benny McKaig (1st season)
- Home arena: Reynolds Coliseum

1981–82 ACC men's basketball standings
	Conf.				Overall
Team	W		L	PCT	W		L	PCT
No. 1 North Carolina †	12	–	2	.857	32	–	2	.941
No. 7 Virginia	12	–	2	.857	30	–	4	.882
No. 16 Wake Forest	9	–	5	.643	21	–	9	.700
No. 10 NC State	7	–	7	.500	22	–	10	.688
Maryland	5	–	9	.357	16	–	13	.552
Duke	4	–	10	.286	10	–	17	.370
Clemson	4	–	10	.286	14	–	14	.500
Georgia Tech	3	–	11	.214	10	–	16	.385
† 1982 ACC tournament winner Rankings from AP poll

The 1981–82 NC State Wolfpack men's basketball team represented North Carolina State University as a member of the Atlantic Coast Conference during the 1981–82 men's college basketball season. Led by second-year head coach Jim Valvano, the Wolfpack played their home games at Reynolds Coliseum in Raleigh, North Carolina. NC State finished with a .500 record in ACC play (7–7) and reached the semifinals of the ACC Tournament. The team received a bid to the NCAA tournament as No. 7 seed in the Mideast region. NC State was defeated by No. 10 seed Chattanooga in the opening round to finish the season with an overall record of 22–10.

== Roster ==
1981–82 NC State Wolfpack men's basketball team
Players
Coaches

Pos.	#	Name	Height	Weight	Year	Hometown
G	10	Max Perry	6 ft 1 in (1.85 m)	161 lb (73 kg)	Sr	Hanover, Indiana
G	12	Emmett Lay	6 ft 4 in (1.93 m)	188 lb (85 kg)	Sr	Tabor City, North Carolina
G	14	Phil Weber	6 ft 2 in (1.88 m)	179 lb (81 kg)	Jr	Northport, New York
G/F	15	Walter Proctor	6 ft 8 in (2.03 m)	212 lb (96 kg)	Fr	Southampton, New York
G	24	Terry Gannon	6 ft 1 in (1.85 m)	165 lb (75 kg)	Fr	Joliet, Illinois
G	25	Dereck Whittenburg	6 ft 1 in (1.85 m)	195 lb (88 kg)	Jr	Glenarden, Maryland
F	30	Harold Thompson	6 ft 5 in (1.96 m)	212 lb (96 kg)	So	Raeford, North Carolina
F	34	Quinton Leonard	6 ft 8 in (2.03 m)	210 lb (95 kg)	Jr	Louisburg, North Carolina
G	35	Sidney Lowe	6 ft 0 in (1.83 m)	195 lb (88 kg)	Jr	Washington, D.C.
F	40	Scott Parzych	6 ft 7 in (2.01 m)	221 lb (100 kg)	Sr	Lockport, Illinois
C	41	Thurl Bailey	6 ft 11 in (2.11 m)	212 lb (96 kg)	Jr	Washington, D.C.
F	42	Mike Warren	6 ft 7 in (2.01 m)	168 lb (76 kg)	Fr	Raleigh, North Carolina
F	43	Lorenzo Charles	6 ft 7 in (2.01 m)	226 lb (103 kg)	Fr	Brooklyn, New York
C	45	Cozell McQueen	6 ft 11 in (2.11 m)	204 lb (93 kg)	Fr	Bennettsville, South Carolina
C	52	Chuck Nevitt	7 ft 5 in (2.26 m)	220 lb (100 kg)	Sr	Marietta, Georgia

Head coach

- Jim Valvano (Rutgers)

Assistant coach(es)

- Marty Fletcher (Maryland)
- Ray Martin (Notre Dame)
- Benny McKaig (Wake Forest)

Legend

- (C) Team captain
- (S) Suspended
- (I) Ineligible
- (W) Walk-on
- Injured
- Current redshirt

== Schedule ==
Date time, TV	Rank^{#}	Opponent^{#}	Result	Record	Site city, state
November 28*		Campbell	W 68–53	1-0	Reynolds Coliseum; Raleigh, North Carolina
Nov 30, 1981*		at Davidson	W 76–55	2–0	Charlotte Coliseum; Charlotte, North Carolina
Dec 2, 1981*		Saint Francis (PA)	W 89–56	3–0	Reynolds Coliseum; Raleigh, North Carolina
Dec 5, 1981*		Saint Peter's	W 44–33	4–0	Reynolds Coliseum; Raleigh, North Carolina
Dec 9, 1981*		Appalachian State	W 66–38	5–0	Reynolds Coliseum; Raleigh, North Carolina
Dec 12, 1981		Maryland	W 74–53	6–0 (1–0)	Reynolds Coliseum; Raleigh, North Carolina
Dec 19, 1981*		UNC Wilmington	W 77–43	7–0	Reynolds Coliseum; Raleigh, North Carolina
Dec 27, 1981*	No. 20	vs. Michigan State; Rainbow Classic	W 67–46	8–0	Neil S. Blaisdell Center; Honolulu, Hawaii
Dec 28, 1981*	No. 20	vs. No. 3 Wichita State; Rainbow Classic	W 60–48	9–0	Neil S. Blaisdell Center; Honolulu, Hawaii
Dec 29, 1981*	No. 20	vs. Rice; Rainbow Classic Championship	L 47–51	9–1	Neil S. Blaisdell Center; Honolulu, Hawaii
Jan 2, 1982	No. 20	Clemson	W 75–59	10–1 (2–0)	Reynolds Coliseum; Raleigh, North Carolina
Jan 4, 1982*	No. 15	Southern Miss	W 46–45	11–1	Reynolds Coliseum; Raleigh, North Carolina
Jan 9, 1982	No. 15	at Georgia Tech	W 55–49	12–1 (3–0)	Alexander Memorial Coliseum; Atlanta, Georgia
Jan 13, 1982	No. 12	No. 1 North Carolina	L 41–61	12–2 (3–1)	Reynolds Coliseum; Raleigh, North Carolina
Jan 16, 1982	No. 12	at Wake Forest	W 52–50	13–2 (4–1)	Winston-Salem Memorial Coliseum; Winston-Salem, North Carolina
Jan 20, 1982	No. 14	at Duke	L 48–49	13–3 (4–2)	Cameron Indoor Stadium; Durham, North Carolina
Jan 23, 1982*	No. 14	East Carolina	W 63–53	14–3	Reynolds Coliseum; Raleigh, North Carolina
Jan 26, 1982	No. 17	Georgia Tech	W 49–40	15–3 (5–2)	Reynolds Coliseum; Raleigh, North Carolina
Jan 30, 1982	No. 17	at No. 2 North Carolina	L 44–58	15–4 (5–3)	Carmichael Auditorium; Chapel Hill, North Carolina
Feb 3, 1982		at Clemson	L 54–65	15–5 (5–4)	Littlejohn Coliseum; Clemson, South Carolina
Feb 5, 1982*		vs. The Citadel	W 54–44	16–5	Charlotte Coliseum; Charlotte, North Carolina
Feb 6, 1982*		vs. Furman	W 67–55	17–5	Charlotte Coliseum; Charlotte, North Carolina
Feb 10, 1982		No. 1 Virginia	L 36–39	17–6 (5–5)	Reynolds Coliseum; Raleigh, North Carolina
Feb 13, 1982*		at Notre Dame	W 62–42	18–6	Joyce Center; Notre Dame, Indiana
Feb 16, 1982		Duke	W 72–56	19–6 (6–5)	Reynolds Coliseum; Raleigh, North Carolina
Feb 20, 1982		at No. 1 Virginia	L 40–45	19–7 (6–6)	University Hall; Charlottesville, Virginia
Feb 22, 1982*		Loyola (MD)	W 80–52	20–7	Reynolds Coliseum; Raleigh, North Carolina
Feb 24, 1982		at Maryland	W 52–38	21–7 (7–6)	Cole Fieldhouse; College Park, Maryland
Feb 27, 1982		No. 18 Wake Forest	L 46–50	21–8 (7–7)	Reynolds Coliseum; Raleigh, North Carolina
ACC Tournament
March 5*		vs. Maryland; ACC tournament Quarterfinal	W 40–28	22–8	Greensboro Coliseum; Greensboro, NC
March 6*		vs. No. 1 North Carolina; ACC Tournament Semifinal	L 46–58	22–9	Greensboro Coliseum; Greensboro, NC
NCAA Tournament
March 12*	(7 ME)	vs. (10 ME) Chattanooga; NCAA tournament first round	L 51–58	22–10	Market Square Arena; Indianapolis, IN
*Non-conference game. ^{#}Rankings from AP poll. (#) Tournament seedings in parentheses. ME=Mideast.

== Rankings ==
Ranking movements Legend: ██ Increase in ranking ██ Decrease in ranking — = Not ranked RV = Received votes
	Week															
Poll	Pre	1	2	3	4	5	6	7	8	9	10	11	12	13	14	Final
AP	—	—	—	—	RV	20	15	12	14	17	—	—	—	—	—	—
Coaches	—	—	—	—	18	18	15	15	15	17	—	—	—	—	—	—
