= John Brownlee (basketball) =

American basketball player

Personal information
- Born: Fort Worth, Texas, U.S.
- Listed height: 6 ft 10 in (2.08 m)
- Listed weight: 230 lb (104 kg)

Career information
- High school: Southwest (Fort Worth, Texas)
- College: North Carolina (1981–1983); Texas (1984–1986)
- NBA draft: 1986: 4th round, 78th overall pick
- Drafted by: Los Angeles Clippers
- Position: Center
- Number: 32, 55

Career highlights
- NCAA champion (1982); SWC Player of the Year (1986); First-team All-SWC (1986); Third-team Parade All-American (1981)
- Stats at Basketball Reference

John Brownlee is an American former professional basketball player. Brownlee played college basketball for North Carolina (1981–1983) and Texas (1984–1986). He played professionally in France and Belgium.

== College ==
Brownlee played his first two years of college basketball at the University of North Carolina at Chapel Hill. He played just 13 games in his freshman year, averaging 0.7 points per game. In his sophomore season, however, he played 33 games and averaged 1.3 points per game as the designated back up to center Sam Perkins as the Tar Heels won the 1981–82 NCAA Men's Basketball championship. He then transferred to The University of Texas at Austin. He played 28 games in his third season of college basketball, averaging 13.8 points per game. In his final year, he took part in 31 games for the Longhorns and led the team in scoring with a 17.0 points per game average. This earned him the 1986 Southwest Conference Player of the Year.

== Professional career ==
Brownlee was selected in the fourth round (78th pick overall) of the 1986 NBA draft by the Los Angeles Clippers. During rookie-free agent camp, Brownlee suffered an injury when he dislocated his little finger during scrimmage. He never got his chance to play in the NBA. He then travelled overseas to France and Belgium to play professionally for 4 years.
