= 1981–82 Virginia Cavaliers men's basketball team =

American college basketball season

1981–82 Virginia Cavaliers men's basketball

ACC regular season co–champions

NCAA tournament, Sweet Sixteen
- Conference: Atlantic Coast Conference

Ranking
- Coaches: No. 3
- AP: No. 3
- Record: 30–4 (12–2 ACC)
- Head coach: Terry Holland (8th season)
- Assistant coaches: Craig Littlepage (6th season); Jim Larranaga (3rd season)
- Home arena: University Hall

1981–82 ACC men's basketball standings
	Conf.				Overall
Team	W		L	PCT	W		L	PCT
No. 1 North Carolina †	12	–	2	.857	32	–	2	.941
No. 7 Virginia	12	–	2	.857	30	–	4	.882
No. 16 Wake Forest	9	–	5	.643	21	–	9	.700
No. 10 NC State	7	–	7	.500	22	–	10	.688
Maryland	5	–	9	.357	16	–	13	.552
Duke	4	–	10	.286	10	–	17	.370
Clemson	4	–	10	.286	14	–	14	.500
Georgia Tech	3	–	11	.214	10	–	16	.385
† 1982 ACC tournament winner Rankings from AP poll

The 1981–82 Virginia Cavaliers men's basketball team represented University of Virginia and was a member of the Atlantic Coast Conference.

Virginia was the top seed in the Mideast region of the 48-team NCAA tournament, but was upset by two points in the Sweet Sixteen by the UAB Blazers, before a partisan crowd in Birmingham.

== Roster ==
1981–82 Virginia Cavaliers men's basketball team
Players
Coaches

Pos.	#	Name	Height	Weight	Year	Hometown
F	4	Jim Miller	6 ft 8 in (2.03 m)	—	Fr	Princeton, West Virginia
F	10	Craig Robinson	6 ft 8 in (2.03 m)	—	Jr	Montclair, New Jersey
G	11	Othell Wilson	6 ft 0 in (1.83 m)	—	So	Woodbridge, Virginia
F/C	12	Dean Carpenter	6 ft 9 in (2.06 m)	—	Sr	New Orleans
G	14	Ricky Stokes	5 ft 10 in (1.78 m)	—	So	Richmond, Virginia
G	21	Jim Runcie	6 ft 1 in (1.85 m)	—	Fr	Hyde Park, New York
G	24	Jeff Jones (C)	6 ft 4 in (1.93 m)	—	Sr	Owensboro, Kentucky
F	30	Kenton Edelin	6 ft 7 in (2.01 m)	—	So	Alexandria, Virginia
G	32	Doug Newburg	6 ft 2 in (1.88 m)	—	Jr	McLean, Virginia
G	33	Kenny Johnson	6 ft 0 in (1.83 m)	—	Fr	Baltimore
F	42	Peter MacBeth	6 ft 9 in (2.06 m)	—	Jr	Indialantic, Florida
G/F	45	Tim Mullen	6 ft 5 in (1.96 m)	—	Fr	Ridgewood, New Jersey
F	51	Dan Merrifield	6 ft 6 in (1.98 m)	—	Fr	Linwood, New Jersey
C	50	Ralph Sampson	7 ft 4 in (2.24 m)	—	Jr	Harrisonburg, Virginia

Head coach

- Terry Holland (Davidson)

Assistant coach(es)

- Craig Littlepage (Penn)
- Jim Larrañaga (Providence)

Legend

- (C) Team captain
- (S) Suspended
- (I) Ineligible
- (W) Walk-on
- Injured
- Current redshirt

== Schedule ==
Date time, TV	Rank^{#}	Opponent^{#}	Result	Record	Site (attendance) city, state
Regular season
Nov. 21*; TVS	No. 7	vs. BYU	W 63–61	1–0	Springfield Civic Center (8,808); Springfield, Massachusetts
Nov. 27*	No. 7	Fairfield	W 107–66	2–0	University Hall (9,000); Charlottesville, Virginia
Nov. 29*	No. 7	George Mason	W 76–57	3–0	University Hall (9,000); Charlottesville, Virginia
Dec. 2*	No. 5	Randolph–Macon	W 82–50	4–0	University Hall (9,000); Charlottesville, Virginia
Dec. 5*	No. 5	at VMI	W 76–49	5–0	Cameron Hall (4,460); Lexington, Virginia
Dec. 9	No. 5	Duke	W 92–83	6–0 (1–0)	University Hall (9,000); Charlottesville, Maryland
Dec. 19*	No. 5	at Chaminade	W 75–59	7–0 (1–0)	Neal S. Blaisdell Center (3,052); Laie, HI
Dec. 21*	No. 5	at BYU–Hawaii	W 118–84	8–0 (1–0)	Cannon Activities Center (1,739); Laie, HI
Dec. 29*	No. 3	vs. Richmond	W 74–43	9–0 (1–0)	Richmond Coliseum (10,716); Richmond, Virginia
Dec. 30*	No. 3	vs. James Madison	W 57–44	10–0 (1–0)	Richmond Coliseum (10,716); Richmond, Virginia
Jan. 2*	No. 3	James Madison	W 73–65	11–0 (1–0)	University Hall (9,000); Charlottesville, Virginia
Jan. 6*	No. 2	Notre Dame	W 87–54	12–0 (1–0)	Capital Centre (17,422); Landover, Maryland
Jan. 9	No. 2	at No. 1 North Carolina	L 60–65	12–1 (1–1)	Carmichael Arena (10,000); Chapel Hill, North Carolina
Jan. 12	No. 3	Maryland	W 45–40 ^{OT}	13–1 (2–1)	University Hall (9,000); Charlottesville, Virginia
Jan. 14*	No. 3	Wagner	W 99–67	14–1 (2–1)	University Hall (9,000); Charlottesville, Georgia
Jan. 16	No. 3	Georgia Tech	W 79–60	15–1 (3–1)	University Hall (9,000); Charlottesville, Virginia
Jan. 17	No. 3	Clemson	W 89–68	16–1 (4–1)	University Hall (5,000); Charlottesville, Virginia
Jan. 20*	No. 3	at George Washington	W 80–54	17–1 (4–1)	Charles E. Smith Center (5,000); Washington, D.C.
Jan. 24*	No. 3	at No. 17 Louisville	W 74–56	18–1 (4–1)	Freedom Hall (16,613); Louisville, Kentucky
Jan. 27	No. 3	at No. 18 Wake Forest	W 69–66	19–1 (5–1)	Greensboro Coliseum (15,867); Greensboro, North Carolina
Jan. 30	No. 3	at Duke	W 77–65	20–1 (6–1)	Cameron Indoor Stadium (8,564); Durham, North Carolina
Feb. 3	No. 3	No. 2 North Carolina	W 74–58	21–1 (7–1)	University Hall; Charlottesville, Virginia
Feb. 6*	No. 3	vs. Virginia Tech	W 80–66	22–1 (7–1)	Roanoke Civic Center (10,056); Roanoke, Virginia
Feb. 10	No. 1	at NC State	W 39–36	23–1 (8–1)	Reynolds Coliseum (12,400); Raleigh, North Carolina
Feb. 13	No. 1	at Clemson	W 56–54	24–1 (9–1)	Littlejohn Coliseum (11,000); Clemson, South Carolina
Feb. 15	No. 1	at Georgia Tech	W 56–52	25–1 (10–1)	Alexander Memorial Coliseum (6,939); Atlanta
Feb. 20	No. 1	NC State	W 45–40	26–1 (11–1)	University Hall (9,000); Charlottesville, Virginia
Feb. 24	No. 1	No. 18 Wake Forest	W 84–66	27–1 (12–1)	University Hall (9,000); Charlottesville, Virginia
Feb. 27	No. 1	at Maryland	L 46–47 ^{OT}	27–2 (12–2)	Cole Field House (14,500); College Park, Maryland
ACC Tournament
Mar. 5	(2) No. 3	vs. (7) Clemson; Quarterfinals	W 56–54	28–2	Greensboro Coliseum (15,875); Greensboro, North Carolina
Mar. 6	(2) No. 3	vs. (3) No. 16 Wake Forest; Semifinals	W 51–49	29–2	Greensboro Coliseum (16,034); Greensboro, North Carolina
Mar. 7	(2) No. 3	vs. (1) No. 1 North Carolina; Championship	L 45–47	29–3	Greensboro Coliseum (16,034); Greensboro, North Carolina
NCAA Tournament
Mar. 14	(1 ME) No. 3	vs. (9 ME) Tennessee; Second Round	W 54–51	30–3	Market Square Arena (15,000); Indianapolis
Mar. 18	(1 ME) No. 3	vs. (4 ME) No. 17 UAB; Sweet Sixteen	L 66–68	30–4	Birmingham–Jefferson Civic Center (16,754); Birmingham, Alabama
*Non-conference game. ^{#}Rankings from AP poll. (#) Tournament seedings in parentheses. All times are in Eastern time.

== Awards and honors ==
- Ralph Sampson, Adolph Rupp Trophy
- Ralph Sampson, Naismith College Player of the Year
- Ralph Sampson, USBWA College Player of the Year
- Ralph Sampson, John R. Wooden Award

== NBA draft ==
Year	Round	Pick	Player	NBA club
1982	4	77	Jeff Jones	Indiana Pacers
1983	1	1	Ralph Sampson	Houston Rockets
1983	3	68	Craig Robinson	Boston Celtics
1984	2	35	Othell Wilson	Golden State Warriors
