= 1981–82 NCAA Division I men's basketball rankings =

- Season: 1981–82
- NCAA Tournament: 1982
- Preseason No. 1: North Carolina
- NCAA Tournament Champions: North Carolina
NCAA Division I men's basketball rankings


The 1981–82 NCAA Division I men's basketball rankings was made up of two human polls, the AP Poll and the Coaches Poll, in addition to various other preseason polls.

== Legend ==
	Increase in ranking
	Decrease in ranking
	New to rankings from previous week
Italics	Number of first place votes
(#–#)	Win–loss record
т	Tied with team above or below also with this symbol

== AP Poll ==
The final writers' poll was released on Monday, March 8.

	Preseason	Week 1 Dec. 1	Week 2 Dec. 8	Week 3 Dec. 15	Week 4 Dec. 22	Week 5 Dec. 29	Week 6 Jan. 5	Week 7 Jan. 12	Week 8 Jan. 19	Week 9 Jan. 26	Week 10 Feb. 2	Week 11 Feb. 9	Week 12 Feb. 16	Week 13 Feb. 23	Week 14 Mar. 2	Final Mar. 9	
1.	North Carolina	North Carolina (1–0)	North Carolina (3–0)	North Carolina (4–0)	North Carolina (5–0)	North Carolina (6–0)	North Carolina (9–0)	North Carolina (12–0)	North Carolina (14–0)	Missouri (16–0)	Missouri (18–0)	Virginia (22–1)	Virginia (25–1)	Virginia (26–1)	North Carolina (24–2)	North Carolina (27–2) (47)	1.
2.	UCLA	Kentucky (1–0)	Kentucky (2–0)	Kentucky (4–0)	Kentucky (6–0)	Wichita State (7–0)	Virginia (11–0)	Missouri (11–0)	Missouri (14–0)	North Carolina (14–1)	North Carolina (16–1)	North Carolina (18–2)	North Carolina (20–2)	North Carolina (22–2)	DePaul (26–1)	DePaul (26–1) (10)	2.
3.	Kentucky	Louisville (0–0)	Louisville (2–0)	Louisville (4–0)	Wichita State (6–0)	Virginia (8–0)	Kentucky (8–1)	Virginia (12–1)	Virginia (16–1)	Virginia (18–1)	Virginia (20–1)	DePaul (20–1)	DePaul (23–1)	DePaul (24–1)	Virginia (27–2)	Virginia (29–3) (1)	3.
4.	Louisville	Wichita State (1–0)	Wichita State (3–0)	Wichita State (5–0)	Virginia (8–0)	Kentucky (6–1)	Missouri (9–0)	DePaul (12–1)	DePaul (15–1)	DePaul (16–1)	DePaul (18–1)	Missouri (19–1)	Missouri (21–1)	Oregon State (20–3)	Oregon State (22–3)	Oregon State (23–4) (1)	4.
5.	Georgetown	Virginia (3–0)	Virginia (5–0)	Virginia (6–0)	Minnesota (5–1)	Arkansas (7–0)	DePaul (11–1)	Iowa (10–1)	Minnesota (11–2)	Texas (14–0)	Iowa (15–2)	Iowa (17–2)	Oregon State (18–3)	Missouri (23–2)	Missouri (23–3)	Missouri (26–3)	5.
6.	Wichita State	Iowa (1–0)	Iowa (3–0)	Iowa (5–0)	Arkansas (6–0)	San Francisco (10–0)	Minnesota (8–1)	Kentucky (9–2)	Iowa (11–2)	Iowa (13–2)	Minnesota (14–3)	Oregon State (16–3)	Tulsa (18–4)	West Virginia (23–1)	Idaho (24–2)	Georgetown (26–6)	6.
7.	Virginia	DePaul (0–0)	DePaul (2–0)	DePaul (4–0)	San Francisco (7–0)	Missouri (7–0)	Iowa (8–1)	San Francisco (13–1)	Texas (13–0)	Kentucky (12–3)	San Francisco (19–2)	Tulsa (16–3)	Iowa (18–3)	Kentucky (19–5)	Minnesota (20–5)	Minnesota (22–5)	7.
8.	DePaul	UCLA (1–1)	Minnesota (3–0)	Minnesota (4–0)	Louisville (5–1)	DePaul (7–1)	San Francisco (11–1)	Georgetown (13–2)	Idaho (15–0)	Oregon State (14–2)	Alabama (16–2)	Arkansas (16–3)	Minnesota (17–4)	Tulsa (19–4)	Georgetown (23–6)	Idaho (26–2)	8.
9.	Iowa	Tulsa (1–0)	UAB (3–0)	Arkansas (5–0)	Missouri (6–0)	Minnesota (5–1)	Wichita State (10–2)	Arkansas (10–1)	Kentucky (10–3)	San Francisco (17–2)	Kentucky (14–4)	Minnesota (15–4)	West Virginia (21–1)	Idaho (23–2)	West Virginia (24–2)	Memphis State (23–4)	9.
10.	Minnesota	Minnesota (0–0)	Indiana (2–0)	San Francisco (5–0)	Iowa (6–1)	Iowa (6–1)	Tulsa (9–1)	Houston (11–1)	Tulsa (13–2)	Minnesota (12–3)	Oregon State (15–3)	Alabama (17–3)	Kentucky (17–5)	Memphis State (19–3)	Tulsa (21–5)	Tulsa (24–5)	10.
11.	Tulsa	UAB (2–0)	Arkansas (3–0)	Missouri (5–0)	Indiana (6–1)	Indiana (6–1)	Arkansas (8–1)	Minnesota (9–2)	San Francisco (15–2)	Idaho (16–1)	Tulsa (15–3)	West Virginia (19–1)	Idaho (21–2)	Iowa (19–4)	Iowa (20–5)	Fresno State (26–2)	11.
12.	Indiana	Indiana (1–0)	San Francisco (3–0)	Tulsa (5–1)	Alabama (7–0)	Alabama (7–0)	Louisville (8–2)	NC State (13–1)	Oregon State (12–2)	Arkansas (13–2)	Texas (14–3)	Kentucky (15–5)	Memphis State (18–3)	Georgetown (21–6)	Fresno State (24–2)	Arkansas (23–5)	12.
13.	Wake Forest	Arkansas (1–0)	Missouri (3–0)	Indiana (4–1)	DePaul (5–1)	Tulsa (7–1)	Georgetown (11–2)	Alabama (11–1)	Georgetown (14–3)	Alabama (14–2)	Wake Forest (14–4)	Idaho (19–2)	Georgetown (20–5)	Minnesota (18–5)	Memphis State (21–4)	Alabama (23–6)	13.
14.	UAB	San Francisco (1–0)	Tulsa (2–1)	Alabama (5–0)	Tulsa (6–1)	Louisville (6–2)	Houston (10–1)	Idaho (13–0)	NC State (14–2)	Kansas State (14–2)	Arkansas (15–3)	Memphis State (16–3)	Wake Forest (17–5)	Fresno State (22–2)	Arkansas (21–5)	West Virginia (26–3)	14.
15.	Missouri	BYU (2–1)	UNLV (4–0)	Southwestern Louisiana (8–0)	UCLA (4–2)	Oregon State (6–1)	NC State (11–1)	Oregon State (10–2)	Arkansas (11–2)	Tennessee (13–3)	Idaho (17–2)	Kansas State (16–4)	Fresno State (20–2)	Arkansas (19–5)	Kentucky (20–6)	Kentucky (22–7)	15.
16.	Georgia	Missouri (0–0)	Alabama (4–0)	UAB (3–1)	Oregon State (5–1)	UCLA (5–2)	Alabama (9–1)	Wichita State (11–3)	Alabama (12–2)	Tulsa (13–3)	Tennessee (14–4)	Wake Forest (15–5)	San Francisco (21–4)	San Francisco (23–4)	Wake Forest (19–7)	Iowa (20–7)	16.
17.	LSU	Alabama (1–0)	UCLA (2–2)	UCLA (3–2)	Georgetown (7–2)	Georgetown (8–2)	Oregon State (9–2)	Louisville (10–3)	Louisville (11–4)	NC State (15–3)	Fresno State (17–1)	San Francisco (19–4)	Arkansas (18–5)	Alabama (19–5)	Kansas State (20–6)	UAB (23–5)	17.
18.	Arkansas	UNLV (2–0)	Southwestern Louisiana (5–0)	Villanova (5–0)	Houston (7–1)	Houston (7–1)	Idaho (11–0)	Tulsa (10–2)	Kansas State (12–2)	Wake Forest (13–3)	West Virginia (17–1)	Fresno State (18–2)	Kansas State (17–5)	Wake Forest (18–6)	Alabama (20–6)	Wake Forest (20–8)	18.
19.	Notre Dame	Notre Dame (1–0)	Oregon State (2–0)	Georgetown (5–2)	UAB (5–2)	Villanova (7–1)	UCLA (6–4)	Texas (10–0)	Houston (11–3)	Fresno State (15–1)	Kansas State (14–4)	Washington (17–3)	Alabama (17–5)	Tennessee (18–6)	UCLA (19–6)	UCLA (21–6)	19.
20.	Alabama	Georgetown (1–2)	Georgetown (3–2)	Oregon State (3–1)	Villanova (6–1)	NC State (7–0)	St. John's (9–1)	Virginia Tech (10–1)	Tennessee (11–3)	Villanova (13–3)	Memphis State (14–3)	Georgetown (18–5)	Indiana (14–7)	UCLA (18–5)	UAB (23–5)	Louisville (20–9)	20.
	Preseason	Week 1 Dec. 1	Week 2 Dec. 8	Week 3 Dec. 15	Week 4 Dec. 22	Week 5 Dec. 29	Week 6 Jan. 5	Week 7 Jan. 12	Week 8 Jan. 19	Week 9 Jan. 26	Week 10 Feb. 2	Week 11 Feb. 9	Week 12 Feb. 16	Week 13 Feb. 23	Week 14 Mar. 2	Final Mar. 9	
		Dropped: Wake Forest; Georgia; LSU	Dropped: BYU; Notre Dame	Dropped: UNLV	Dropped: Southwestern Louisiana	Dropped: UAB	Dropped: Indiana (6–3); Villanova	Dropped: UCLA; St. John's	Dropped: Wichita State; Virginia Tech	Dropped: Louisville; Houston; Tennessee	Dropped: NC State; Villanova	Dropped: Texas (14–5); Tennessee	Dropped: Washington	Dropped: Kansas State (18–6); Indiana	Dropped: San Francisco; Tennessee (18–8)	Dropped: Kansas State (21–7)	

== UPI Poll ==
The final coaches' poll was released on Monday, March 8.

	Preseason	Week 2 Dec. 8	Week 3 Dec. 15	Week 4 Dec. 22	Week 5 Dec. 29	Week 6 Jan. 5	Week 7 Jan. 12	Week 8 Jan. 19	Week 9 Jan. 26	Week 10 Feb. 2	Week 11 Feb. 9	Week 12 Feb. 16	Week 13 Feb. 23	Week 14 Mar. 2	Final Mar. 9	
1.	North Carolina	North Carolina (3–0)	North Carolina (4–0)	North Carolina (5–0)	North Carolina (6–0)	North Carolina (9–0)	North Carolina (12–0)	North Carolina (14–0)	Missouri (16–0)	Missouri (18–0)	Virginia (22–1)	Virginia (25–1)	Virginia (26–1)	North Carolina (24–2)	North Carolina (27–2) (38)	1.
2.	UCLA	Kentucky (2–0)	Kentucky (4–0)	Kentucky (6–0)	Virginia (8–0)	Virginia (11–0)	Virginia (12–1)	Missouri (14–0)	North Carolina (14–1)	North Carolina (16–1)	North Carolina (16–1)	North Carolina (20–2)	North Carolina (22–2)	DePaul (26–1)	DePaul (26–1) (4)	2.
3.	Kentucky	Louisville (2–0)	Louisville (4–0)	Virginia (8–0)	Kentucky (6–1)	Kentucky (8–1)	Missouri (11–0)	Virginia (16–1)	Virginia (18–1)	DePaul (18–1)	DePaul (20–1)	DePaul (23–1)	DePaul (24–1)	Virginia (27–2)	Virginia (29–3)	3.
4.	Louisville	Virginia (5–0)	Wichita State (5–0)	Wichita State (6–0)	Wichita State (7–0)	DePaul (11–1)	DePaul (12–1)	DePaul (15–1)	DePaul (16–1)	Virginia (20–1)	Missouri (19–1)	Missouri (21–1)	Oregon State (20–3)	Oregon State (22–3)	Oregon State (23–4)	4.
5.	Georgetown	Iowa (3–0)	Iowa (5–0)	Minnesota (5–1)	DePaul (7–1)	Missouri (9–0)	Iowa (10–1)	Texas (13–0)	Texas (14–0)	Iowa (15–2)	Iowa (17–2)	Oregon State (18–3)	Missouri (23–2)	Missouri (23–3)	Missouri (26–3)	5.
6.	Virginia	Wichita State (3–0)	Virginia (6–0)	Arkansas (6–0)	Arkansas (7–0)	Minnesota (8–1)	Kentucky (9–2)	Minnesota (11–2) т	Iowa (13–2)	Minnesota (14–3)	Oregon State (16–3)	Iowa (18–3)	West Virginia (23–1)	Idaho (24–2)	Minnesota (22–5)	6.
7.	Wichita State	DePaul (2–0)	DePaul (4–0)	Indiana (6–1)	Missouri (7–0)	Iowa (8–1)	Georgetown (13–2)	Iowa (11–2) т	Oregon State (14–2)	Oregon State (15–3)	Tulsa (16–3)	Tulsa (18–4)	Iowa (19–4)	Minnesota (20–5)	Georgetown (26–6)	7.
8.	Iowa	Indiana (2–0)	Arkansas (5–0)	San Francisco (7–0)	San Francisco (10–0)	Louisville (8–2)	San Francisco (13–1)	Idaho (15–0)	Kentucky (12–3)	San Francisco (19–2)	Minnesota (15–4)	Minnesota (17–4)	Idaho (23–2)	Georgetown (23–6)	Idaho (26–2)	8.
9.	DePaul	Minnesota (3–0)	Minnesota (4–0)	Louisville (5–1)	Iowa (6–1)	Georgetown (11–2)	Minnesota (9–2)	Kentucky (10–3)	Minnesota (12–3)	Kentucky (14–4)	Kentucky (15–5)	Kentucky (17–5)	Kentucky (19–5)	Fresno State (24–2)	Memphis State (23–4)	9.
10.	Minnesota	Arkansas (3–0)	Missouri (5–0)	Missouri (6–0)	Indiana (6–1)	San Francisco (11–1)	Arkansas (10–1)	Oregon State (12–2)	Idaho (16–1)	Alabama (16–2)	Arkansas (16–3)	West Virginia (21–1)	Tulsa (19–4)	Iowa (20–5)	Fresno State (26–2)	10.
11.	Indiana	Missouri (3–0)	Indiana (4–1)	Iowa (6–1)	Minnesota (5–1)	Arkansas (8–1)	Idaho (13–0)	Georgetown (14–3)	Arkansas (13–2)	Texas (14–3)	Alabama (17–3)	Idaho (21–2)	Georgetown (21–6)	Memphis State (21–4)	Tulsa (24–5)	11.
12.	Tulsa	UAB (3–0)	San Francisco (5–0)	DePaul (5–1)	Oregon State (6–1)	Wichita State (10–2)	Houston (11–1)	Tulsa (13–2)	San Francisco (17–2)	Tulsa (15–3)	Idaho (19–2)	Georgetown (20–5)	Fresno State (22–2)	Kentucky (20–6)	Alabama (23–6)	12.
13.	Georgia	UNLV (4–0)	Louisiana-Lafayette (8–0)	Georgetown (7–2)	Louisville (6–2)	Idaho (11–0)	Louisville (10–3)	San Francisco (15–2)	Kansas State (14–2)	Fresno State (17–1)	West Virginia (19–1)	Memphis State (18–3)	Memphis State (19–3)	West Virginia (24–2)	Arkansas (23–5)	13.
14.	Wake Forest	San Francisco (3–0)	Tulsa (5–1)	Alabama (7–0)	Alabama (7–0)	Tulsa (9–1)	Oregon State (10–2)	Arkansas (11–2)	Alabama (14–2)	Arkansas (15–3)	Kansas State (16–4)	Fresno State (20–2)	Minnesota (18–5)	Tulsa (21–5)	Kentucky (22–7)	14.
15.	Missouri	Oregon State (2–0)	Alabama (5–0)	Oregon State (5–1)	Georgetown (8–2)	NC State (11–1)	NC State (13–1)	NC State (14–2)	Tennessee (13–3)	Idaho (17–2)	San Francisco (19–4)	Alabama (17–5)	Arkansas (19–5)	Arkansas (21–5)	Wyoming (23–5)	15.
16.	San Francisco	Tulsa (2–1)	Villanova (5–0)	Tulsa (6–1)	Tulsa (7–1)	Houston (10–1)	Alabama (11–1)	Kansas State (12–2)	Tulsa (13–3)	Wake Forest (14–4)	Fresno State (18–2)	Kansas State (17–5)	Alabama (19–5)	Kansas State (20–6)	Iowa (20–7)	16.
17.	UAB	Louisiana-Lafayette (5–0)	Georgetown (5–2)	Houston (7–1)	Houston (7–1)	Alabama (9–1)	Wichita State (11–3)	Alabama (12–2)	NC State (15–3)	Tennessee (14–4)	Georgetown (18–5)	Arkansas (18–5)	San Francisco (23–4)	Wyoming (20–6)	West Virginia (26–3)	17.
18.	LSU	Villanova (3–0)	Georgia (3–1)	NC State (7–0)	NC State (7–0)	St. John's (9–1)	Texas (10–0)	Louisville (11–4)	Fresno State (15–1)	Kansas State (14–4)	Memphis State (16–3)	Wake Forest (17–5)	Tennessee (18–6)	Wake Forest (19–7) т	Kansas State (21–7)	18.
19.	Arkansas	Alabama (4–0)	UAB (3–1)	Kansas (5–2)	Villanova (7–1)	Oregon State (9–2)	Tulsa (10–2)	Villanova (12–2)	Villanova (13–3)	West Virginia (17–1)	Wake Forest (15–5)	San Francisco (21–4)	Kansas State (18–6)	Louisville (18–8) т	Wake Forest (20–8)	19.
20.	UNLV	UCLA (2–2)	UC Irvine (6–0)	Villanova (6–1)	Wake Forest (6–1)	Indiana (6–3)	Kansas State (10–2)	Fresno State (13–1)	Wake Forest (13–3)	Georgetown (16–5)	Wyoming (17–5)	Tennessee (16–6)	Wake Forest (18–6)	Pepperdine (20–6) т Tennessee (18–8) т	Louisville (20–9)	20.
	Preseason	Week 2 Dec. 8	Week 3 Dec. 15	Week 4 Dec. 22	Week 5 Dec. 29	Week 6 Jan. 5	Week 7 Jan. 12	Week 8 Jan. 19	Week 9 Jan. 26	Week 10 Feb. 2	Week 11 Feb. 9	Week 12 Feb. 16	Week 13 Feb. 23	Week 14 Mar. 2	Final Mar. 9	
		Dropped: Georgetown (3–2); Georgia; Wake Forest; LSU	Dropped: UNLV; Oregon State; UCLA	Dropped: Louisiana-Lafayette; Georgia; UAB; UC Irvine	Dropped: Kansas	Dropped: Villanova; Wake Forest	Dropped: St. John's; Indiana	Dropped: Houston (11–3); Wichita State	Dropped: Georgetown; Louisville	Dropped: NC State; Villanova	Dropped: Texas; Tennessee	Dropped: Wyoming	None	Dropped: Alabama (20–6); San Francisco	Dropped: Pepperdine; Tennessee	
