= 1982 NCAA Division I men's basketball tournament =

Edition of USA college basketball tournament

- Season: 1981–82
- Teams: 48
- Finals site: Louisiana Superdome, New Orleans, Louisiana
- Champions: North Carolina Tar Heels (2nd title, 6th title game, 9th Final Four)
- Runner-up: Georgetown Hoyas (2nd title game, 2nd Final Four)
- Semifinalists: Houston Cougars (3rd Final Four); Louisville Cardinals (5th Final Four)
- Winning coach: Dean Smith (1st title)
- MOP: James Worthy (North Carolina)
- Attendance: 427,251
- Top scorer: Rob Williams (Houston) (88 points)

The 1982 NCAA Division I men's basketball tournament involved 48 schools playing in single-elimination play to determine the national champion of men's NCAA Division I college basketball. The 44th annual edition of the tournament began on March 11, 1982, and ended with the championship game on March 29 in the Louisiana Superdome in New Orleans, Louisiana. A total of 47 games were played.

North Carolina, coached by Dean Smith, won the national title with a 63–62 victory in the final game over Georgetown, coached by John Thompson. James Worthy of North Carolina was named the Tournament's Most Outstanding Player.

This tournament was the first to eliminate the national third-place game, which had been held every year since the 1946 tournament. It was also the first tournament to be televised by CBS after it acquired the broadcasting rights from NBC. Gary Bender and Billy Packer (also from NBC Sports) called the Final Four and National Championship games. In addition, it was the first tournament to include the word "Men's" in its official title, as the NCAA began sponsoring national championships in women's sports (including basketball) in the 1981–82 school year.

This was the last NCAA tournament to grant automatic bids to the winners of ECAC regional tournaments for Northeastern Division I independents organized by the Eastern College Athletic Conference, a loose sports federation of Northeastern colleges and universities. The practice had begun with the 1975 tournament to ensure that Northeastern independents would not be excluded, but was discontinued when all remaining Northeastern independents formed new conferences or joined existing ones after this season.

For the first time since 1966, the tournament field did not include UCLA.

== Championship game ==
The 1982 NCAA Division I Men's Championship Game was between the Georgetown Hoyas and the North Carolina Tar Heels. Both teams had Hall of Fame coaches, Dean Smith for the Tar Heels and John Thompson for the Hoyas. As for players, five future NBA All-Stars were included between the two sides—the Hoyas featured center Patrick Ewing and Eric "Sleepy" Floyd, while the Tar Heels answered with forward James Worthy, forward and center Sam Perkins, and young guard Michael Jordan. This also marked the only NCAA championship game to feature three of the NBA 50 Greatest Players (Jordan, Ewing and Worthy) chosen in 1996 on the occasion of the NBA's 50th anniversary.

The championship matchup was tightly contested throughout, with no team ever leading by more than a few points, and 15 lead changes in the game overall. With slightly over a minute to go, Floyd scored to put Georgetown on top, 62–61. During the ensuing timeout, Smith predicted that Georgetown would heavily guard Worthy and Perkins and drew up a play that would work the ball around to Jordan and then met Jordan's eyes and told him to not be afraid to shoot if he was open. When the ball was worked around, Jimmy Black found Jordan on the left wing, and he rose and hit a jumper with 17 seconds to go to put Carolina back on top, 63–62. Georgetown did not call timeout but immediately pushed the ball up the court. However, guard Fred Brown mistook Carolina's James Worthy for a teammate and passed the ball right to his opponent. Worthy was fouled by Eric Smith with two seconds to go. He missed both free throws, but with no timeouts left (Georgetown coach John Thompson, in a questionable move, used his last one before Worthy's free throws rather than save it to set up a final play) the Hoyas' last desperation shot fell short. On the other hand, Dean Smith's decision to draw up a play for Jordan, rather than Worthy or Perkins, is often regarded as a brilliant coaching move.

His Airness. MJ. Air Jordan. Before Michael Jordan was any of these things, before he was the most recognizable athlete in the world, he was Mike Jordan, the freshman for North Carolina. Then he hit a game-winning shot in the 1982 national championship game, and Mike became Michael Jordan, who became all of the above.

— Powell Latimer in the Daily Tar Heel before Jordan's 2009 Hall of Fame induction

Aside from the dramatic finish in the final minute, the 1982 NCAA championship game is today primarily remembered as being the stage on which several eventual basketball legends were introduced to a national audience, particularly North Carolina's Jordan and Georgetown's Ewing, both 19-year-old freshmen at the time of this game. Both had outstanding games - Jordan with 16 points including the game-winner, and Ewing with 23 points and 10 rebounds (but also a few goaltends on blocks that John Thompson supported for intimidation purposes). Jordan and Ewing would go on to have more memorable clashes in the National Basketball Association with the Chicago Bulls and New York Knicks respectively, and both would be inducted into the Hall of Fame. For Jordan's part, his game-winner is often seen as the launching point of his career - the moment that gave him the confidence to become one of the greatest basketball players of all time, in no small part due to his clutch performance. Jordan has said multiple times that before he would take game-winning shots with the Bulls, he would sometimes think back to his shot in the 1982 game that propelled North Carolina past Georgetown.

The best player of the 1982 title game, and a third player in this game who would eventually be inducted to the Pro Basketball Hall of Fame, was Carolina's James Worthy. Worthy scored a game-high 28 points, showing the blazing speed and some of the same authoritative drives to the basket that later became familiar sights during his career with the Los Angeles Lakers during the 1980s. Beyond these three players, two other noticeable players of the 1980s and early 90s appeared in this 1982 game: Georgetown's Sleepy Floyd, who went on to an All-Star career in the NBA (including a still-standing record for most points in a quarter and in a half for a playoff game) and Carolina's Sam Perkins, who distinguished himself over a durable NBA career lasting 17 seasons.

== Schedule and venues ==
1982 sites for first and second round games
1983 Regionals (blue) and Final Four (red)

The following are the sites that were selected to host each round of the 1982 tournament:

First and Second Rounds

- March 11 and 13
  - East Region
    - Charlotte Coliseum, Charlotte, North Carolina (Host: University of North Carolina at Charlotte)
  - Mideast Region
    - Memorial Gymnasium, Nashville, Tennessee (Host: Vanderbilt University)
  - Midwest Region
    - Mabee Center, Tulsa, Oklahoma (Host: Oral Roberts University)
  - West Region
    - Dee Glen Smith Spectrum, Logan, Utah (Host: Utah State University)
- March 12 and 14
  - East Region
    - Nassau Veterans Memorial Coliseum, Uniondale, New York (Host: Hofstra University)
  - Mideast Region
    - Market Square Arena, Indianapolis, Indiana (Hosts: Butler University, Midwestern City Conference)
  - Midwest Region
    - Reunion Arena, Dallas, Texas (Host: Southwest Conference)
  - West Region
    - Beasley Coliseum, Pullman, Washington (Host: Washington State University)

Regional semifinals and finals (Sweet Sixteen and Elite Eight)

- March 18 and 20
  - Mideast Regional, BJCC Coliseum, Birmingham, Alabama (Host: Southeastern Conference)
  - West Regional, Marriott Center, Provo, Utah (Host: Brigham Young University)
- March 19 and 21
  - East Regional, Reynolds Coliseum, Raleigh, North Carolina (Host: North Carolina State University)
  - Midwest Regional, The Checkerdome, St. Louis, Missouri (Host: Missouri Valley Conference)

National semifinals and championship (Final Four and championship)

- March 27 and 29
  - Louisiana Superdome, New Orleans, Louisiana (Host: Tulane University)

== Teams ==
| Region | Seed | Team | Coach | Conference | Finished | Final Opponent | Score |
East
| East | 1 | North Carolina | Dean Smith | ACC | Champion | 1 Georgetown | W 63–62 |
| East | 2 | Memphis State (Vacated) | Dana Kirk | Metro | Sweet Sixteen | 3 Villanova | L 70–66 |
| East | 3 | Villanova | Rollie Massimino | Big East | Regional Runner-up | 1 North Carolina | L 70–60 |
| East | 4 | Alabama | Wimp Sanderson | SEC | Sweet Sixteen | 1 North Carolina | L 74–69 |
| East | 5 | St. John's | Lou Carnesecca | Big East | Round of 32 | 4 Alabama | L 69–68 |
| East | 6 | Saint Joseph's | Jim Boyle | East Coast | Round of 48 | 11 Northeastern | L 63–62 |
| East | 7 | Wake Forest | Carl Tacy | ACC | Round of 32 | 2 Memphis State | L 56–55 |
| East | 8 | Ohio State | Eldon Miller | Big Ten | Round of 48 | 9 James Madison | L 55–48 |
| East | 9 | James Madison | Lou Campanelli | ECAC South | Round of 32 | 1 North Carolina | L 52–50 |
| East | 10 | Old Dominion | Paul Webb | ECAC South | Round of 48 | 7 Wake Forest | L 74–57 |
| East | 11 | Northeastern | Jim Calhoun | ECAC North | Round of 32 | 3 Villanova | L 76–72 |
| East | 12 | Penn | Bob Weinhauer | Ivy League | Round of 48 | 5 St. John's | L 66–56 |
Mideast
| Mideast | 1 | Virginia | Terry Holland | ACC | Sweet Sixteen | 4 UAB | L 68–66 |
| Mideast | 2 | Minnesota | Jim Dutcher | Big Ten | Sweet Sixteen | 3 Louisville | L 67–61 |
| Mideast | 3 | Louisville | Denny Crum | Metro | National semifinals | 1 Georgetown | L 50–46 |
| Mideast | 4 | UAB | Gene Bartow | Sun Belt | Regional Runner-up | 3 Louisville | L 75–68 |
| Mideast | 5 | Indiana | Bob Knight | Big Ten | Round of 32 | 4 UAB | L 80–70 |
| Mideast | 6 | Kentucky | Joe B. Hall | SEC | Round of 48 | 11 Middle Tennessee State | L 50–44 |
| Mideast | 7 | NC State | Jim Valvano | ACC | Round of 48 | 10 Chattanooga | L 58–51 |
| Mideast | 8 | Southwestern Louisiana | Bobby Paschal | Southland | Round of 48 | 9 Tennessee | L 61–57 |
| Mideast | 9 | Tennessee | Don DeVoe | SEC | Round of 32 | 1 Virginia | L 54–51 |
| Mideast | 10 | Chattanooga | Murray Arnold | Southern | Round of 32 | 2 Minnesota | L 62–61 |
| Mideast | 11 | Middle Tennessee State | Stan Simpson | Ohio Valley | Round of 32 | 3 Louisville | L 81–56 |
| Mideast | 12 | Robert Morris | Matthew Furjanic Jr. | ECAC Metro | Round of 48 | 5 Indiana | L 94–62 |
Midwest
| Midwest | 1 | DePaul | Ray Meyer | Independent | Round of 32 | 8 Boston College | L 82–75 |
| Midwest | 2 | Missouri | Norm Stewart | Big Eight | Sweet Sixteen | 6 Houston | L 79–78 |
| Midwest | 3 | Tulsa | Nolan Richardson | Missouri Valley | Round of 32 | 6 Houston | L 78–74 |
| Midwest | 4 | Arkansas | Eddie Sutton | Southwest | Round of 32 | 5 Kansas State | L 65–64 |
| Midwest | 5 | Kansas State | Jack Hartman | Big Eight | Sweet Sixteen | 8 Boston College | L 69–65 |
| Midwest | 6 | Houston | Guy Lewis | Southwest | National semifinals | 1 North Carolina | L 68–63 |
| Midwest | 7 | Marquette | Hank Raymonds | Independent | Round of 32 | 2 Missouri | L 73–69 |
| Midwest | 8 | Boston College | Tom Davis | Big East | Regional Runner-up | 6 Houston | L 99–92 |
| Midwest | 9 | San Francisco | Peter Barry | West Coast | Round of 48 | 8 Boston College | L 70–66 |
| Midwest | 10 | Evansville | Dick Walters | Midwestern City | Round of 48 | 7 Marquette | L 67–62 |
| Midwest | 11 | Alcorn State | Davey Whitney | SWAC | Round of 48 | 6 Houston | L 94–84 |
| Midwest | 12 | Northern Illinois | John McDougal | Mid-American | Round of 48 | 5 Kansas State | L 77–68 |
West
| West | 1 | Georgetown | John Thompson | Big East | Runner Up | 1 North Carolina | L 63–62 |
| West | 2 | Oregon State | Ralph Miller | Pacific-10 | Regional Runner-up | 1 Georgetown | L 69–45 |
| West | 3 | Idaho | Don Monson | Big Sky | Sweet Sixteen | 2 Oregon State | L 60–42 |
| West | 4 | Fresno State | Boyd Grant | Pacific Coast | Sweet Sixteen | 1 Georgetown | L 58–40 |
| West | 5 | West Virginia | Gale Catlett | Eastern | Round of 32 | 4 Fresno State | L 50–46 |
| West | 6 | Iowa | Lute Olson | Big Ten | Round of 32 | 3 Idaho | L 69–67 |
| West | 7 | Pepperdine | Jim Harrick | West Coast | Round of 32 | 2 Oregon State | L 70–51 |
| West | 8 | Wyoming | Jim Brandenburg | WAC | Round of 32 | 1 Georgetown | L 51–43 |
| West | 9 | USC | Stan Morrison | Pacific-10 | Round of 48 | 8 Wyoming | L 61–58 |
| West | 10 | Pittsburgh | Roy Chipman | Eastern | Round of 48 | 7 Pepperdine | L 99–88 |
| West | 11 | Northeast Louisiana | Mike Vining | Trans America | Round of 48 | 6 Iowa | L 70–63 |
| West | 12 | North Carolina A&T | Don Corbett | MEAC | Round of 48 | 5 West Virginia | L 102–72 |

== Bracket ==
* – Denotes overtime period

=== East region ===
First round
8 | Ohio State | 48
9 | James Madison | 55
5 | St. John's | 66
12 | Penn | 56
6 | Saint Joseph's | 62
11 | Northeastern | 63
7 | Wake Forest | 74
10 | Old Dominion | 57

Second round
9 | James Madison | 50
1 | North Carolina | 52
4 | Alabama | 69
5 | St. John's | 68
11 | Northeastern | 72***
3 | Villanova | 76
2 | Memphis State# | 56
7 | Wake Forest | 55

Regional semifinals Friday, March 19
1 | North Carolina | 74
4 | Alabama | 69
3 | Villanova | 70
2 | Memphis State# | 66

Regional Finals; Sunday, March 21
1 | North Carolina | 70
3 | Villanova | 60

# - Memphis State was forced to vacate its NCAA tournament appearance after a massive gambling scandal and a criminal investigation into head coach Dana Kirk. Unlike forfeiture, a vacated game does not result in the other school being credited with a win, only with Memphis removing the wins from its own record.

=== Midwest region ===
First round
8 | Boston College | 70
9 | San Francisco | 66
5 | Kansas State | 77
12 | Northern Illinois | 68
6 | Houston | 94
11 | Alcorn State | 84
7 | Marquette | 67
10 | Evansville | 62

Second round
8 | Boston College | 82
1 | DePaul | 75
4 | Arkansas | 64
5 | Kansas State | 65
6 | Houston | 78
3 | Tulsa | 74
2 | Missouri | 73
7 | Marquette | 69

Regional semifinals Friday, March 19
8 | Boston College | 69
5 | Kansas State | 65
6 | Houston | 79
2 | Missouri | 78

Regional Finals; Sunday, March 21
8 | Boston College | 92
6 | Houston | 99

=== Mideast region ===
First round
8 | Southwest Louisiana | 57
9 | Tennessee | 61
5 | Indiana | 94
12 | Robert Morris | 62
6 | Kentucky | 44
11 | Middle Tennessee State | 50
7 | NC State | 51
10 | Chattanooga | 58

Second round
9 | Tennessee | 51
1 | Virginia | 54
4 | UAB | 80
5 | Indiana | 70
11 | Middle Tennessee State | 56
3 | Louisville | 81
2 | Minnesota | 62
10 | Chattanooga | 61

Regional semifinals Thursday, March 18
1 | Virginia | 66
4 | UAB | 68
3 | Louisville | 67
2 | Minnesota | 61

Regional Finals; Saturday, March 20
4 | UAB | 68
3 | Louisville | 75

=== West region ===
First round
8 | Wyoming | 61
9 | USC | 58
5 | West Virginia | 102
12 | North Carolina A&T | 72
6 | Iowa | 70
11 | Northeast Louisiana | 63
7 | Pepperdine | 99
10 | Pittsburgh | 88

Second round
8 | Wyoming | 43
1 | Georgetown | 51
4 | Fresno State | 50
5 | West Virginia | 46
6 | Iowa | 67*
3 | Idaho | 69
2 | Oregon State | 70
7 | Pepperdine | 51

Regional semifinals Thursday, March 18
1 | Georgetown | 58
4 | Fresno State | 40
3 | Idaho | 42
2 | Oregon State | 60

Regional Finals; Saturday, March 20
1 | Georgetown | 69
2 | Oregon State | 45

=== Final Four ===
National semifinals Saturday, March 27
E1 | North Carolina | 68
MW6 | Houston | 63
ME3 | Louisville | 46
W1 | Georgetown | 50

National Final; Monday, March 29
E1 | North Carolina | 63
W1 | Georgetown | 62

== Announcers ==
- Gary Bender and Billy Packer – First round at Logan, Utah (Wyoming–USC); Second Round at Logan, Utah (Georgetown–Wyoming, Fresno State–West Virginia); Second Round at Indianapolis, Indiana (Virginia–Tennessee, Minnesota–Chattanooga); East Regional semifinal (North Carolina–Alabama) at Raleigh, North Carolina; East Regional Final at Raleigh, North Carolina; Mideast Regional Final at Birmingham, Alabama; Final Four at New Orleans, Louisiana
- Frank Glieber and Steve Grote – Second Round at Nashville, Tennessee (Louisville–Middle Tennessee State, UAB–Indiana); Second Round at Dallas, Texas (DePaul–Boston College, Arkansas–Kansas State); West Regional semifinal (Georgetown–Fresno State) at Provo, Utah; Midwest Regional Final at St. Louis, Missouri; West Regional Final at Provo, Utah
- Jim Thacker and Bill Raftery – East Regional semifinal (Villanova–Memphis State) at Raleigh, North Carolina
- Tom Hammond and Larry Conley – Mideast Regional semifinals at Birmingham, Alabama
- Fred White and Gary Thompson – Midwest Regional semifinals at St. Louis, Missouri
- Larry Zimmer and Irv Brown – West Regional semifinal (Oregon State–Idaho) at Provo, Utah
- Jim Thacker and Bill Foster – First round at Charlotte, North Carolina (Ohio State–James Madison, Wake Forest–Old Dominion); Second Round at Charlotte, North Carolina (North Carolina–James Madison, Memphis State–Wake Forest); Second Round at Uniondale, New York (Villanova–Northeastern, Alabama–St. John's)
- Verne Lundquist and Dale Brown – Second Round at Tulsa, Oklahoma (Tulsa–Houston, Missouri–Marquette)
- Irv Brown and George Raveling – Second Round at Pullman, Washington (Idaho–Iowa, Oregon State–Pepperdine)
- Tim Ryan and Irv Brown – First round at Pullman, Washington (Iowa–Northeast Louisiana)

== See also ==
- 1982 NCAA Division II men's basketball tournament
- 1982 NCAA Division III men's basketball tournament
- 1982 NCAA Division I women's basketball tournament
- 1982 NCAA Division II women's basketball tournament
- 1982 NCAA Division III women's basketball tournament
- 1982 National Invitation Tournament
- 1982 National Women's Invitation Tournament
- 1982 NAIA Division I men's basketball tournament
- 1982 NAIA Division I women's basketball tournament
