= Sam Perkins =

American basketball player (born 1961)

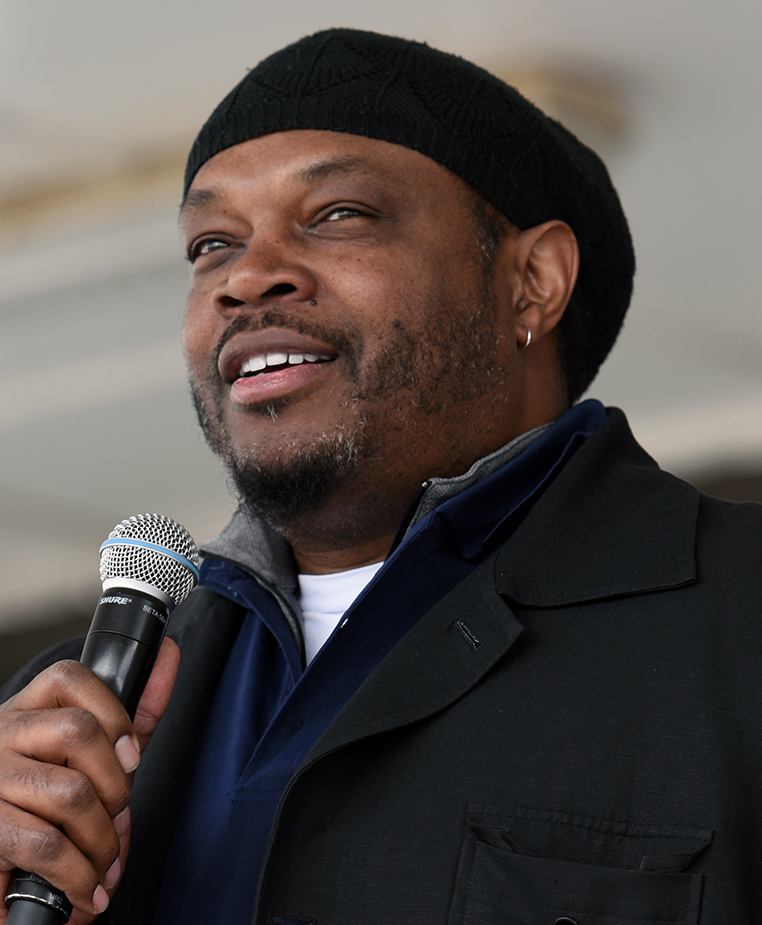
- Perkins in 2016

Personal information
- Born: June 14, 1961 (age 65) Brooklyn, New York, U.S.
- Listed height: 6 ft 9 in (2.06 m)
- Listed weight: 260 lb (118 kg)

Career information
- High school: Samuel J. Tilden (Brooklyn, New York); Shaker (Latham, New York)
- College: North Carolina (1980–1984)
- NBA draft: 1984: 1st round, 4th overall pick
- Drafted by: Dallas Mavericks
- Playing career: 1984–2001
- Position: Power forward / center
- Number: 41, 44, 14

Career history
- 1984–1990: Dallas Mavericks
- 1990–1993: Los Angeles Lakers
- 1993–1998: Seattle SuperSonics
- 1999–2001: Indiana Pacers

Career highlights
- NBA All-Rookie First Team (1985); NCAA champion (1982); 2× Consensus first-team All-American (1983, 1984); Consensus second-team All-American (1982); 3× First-team All-ACC (1982–1984); ACC tournament MVP (1981); ACC Rookie of the Year (1981); No. 41 honored by North Carolina Tar Heels; USA Basketball Male Athlete of the Year (1984); First-team Parade All-American (1980); McDonald's All-American (1980)

Career NBA statistics
- Points: 15,324 (11.9 ppg)
- Rebounds: 7,666 (6.0 rpg)
- Blocks: 933 (0.7 bpg)
- Stats at NBA.com
- Stats at Basketball Reference
- Collegiate Basketball Hall of Fame
Medals
Men's basketball
Representing United States
Olympic Games
Gold medal – first place	1984 Los Angeles	Team competition
Pan American Games
Gold medal – first place	1983 Caracas	Team competition
FIBA U19 World Championship
Gold medal – first place	1979 Salvador	Team competition

Samuel Bruce Perkins (born June 14, 1961) is an American former professional basketball player and executive. Perkins was a three-time college All-American, was a member of the 1982 national champion North Carolina Tar Heels, and won a gold medal with the 1984 United States men's Olympic basketball team. Perkins played professionally in the National Basketball Association (NBA) for 17 seasons.

== Early life ==
Perkins was born in Brooklyn, New York, and attended Samuel J. Tilden High School. He later attended and graduated from Shaker High School in Latham, New York. He was named large-school high school player of the year by the New York State Sportswriters Association in 1980, and was also named to the 35 Greatest Boys McDonald's All Americans team.

== College career ==
Perkins attended the University of North Carolina, playing basketball for the North Carolina Tar Heels from 1980 to 1984 and graduating with his class. He was named ACC Rookie of the Year in 1981 and starred alongside future NBA Hall of Famers James Worthy and Michael Jordan on the Tar Heels' 1982 NCAA championship team. He was a three-time All-American, three-time first-team All-ACC, and named the 1984 USA Basketball Male Athlete of the Year. Perkins finished his collegiate basketball career as the Tar Heels' all-time leader in rebounds and blocked shots and as the second-highest scorer in team history. Perkins was a co-captain of the gold medal-winning 1984 United States men's Olympic basketball team.

== Professional career ==
Perkins was chosen by the Dallas Mavericks as the fourth overall pick in the 1984 NBA draft, and went on to play as a power forward and center in the NBA from 1984 to 2001 with Dallas, the Los Angeles Lakers, Seattle SuperSonics, and Indiana Pacers. He was named to the NBA All-Rookie First Team in 1985, and scored a career-high 45 points on April 12, 1990. Perkins tied an NBA record on January 15, 1997, by making eight three-pointers without a miss. He appeared in three NBA Finals: in 1991 (with the Lakers), in 1996 (with the SuperSonics), and in 2000 (with the Pacers). All three Finals were lost to teams coached by Phil Jackson. In game one of the 1991 NBA Finals, Perkins made a game-winning three-point shot to defeat the Chicago Bulls. He was known by the nicknames "Sleepy Sam", "Big Smooth", and "The Big Easy".

== Post-retirement activities ==
In 2002, Perkins was named to the ACC 50th Anniversary men's basketball team as one of the fifty greatest players in Atlantic Coast Conference history.

In 2008, Perkins was named vice president of player relations for the Indiana Pacers. That September, he was inducted into the New York City Basketball Hall of Fame. Perkins held his position with the Pacers until 2010.

In 2011, Perkins traveled to South Sudan as a SportsUnited Sports Envoy for the U.S. Department of State. In this capacity, he worked with Dikembe Mutombo to lead a series of basketball clinics and team-building exercises with 50 youth and 36 coaches. This helped contribute to the State Department's mission to remove barriers and create a world in which individuals with disabilities enjoy dignity and full inclusion in society.

Perkins was named to the National Collegiate Basketball Hall of Fame in 2018.

Perkins at his camp in 2019

Perkins runs a summer camp for Chapel Hill, North Carolina, youth that focuses on developing the basic skills of basketball.

== Personal life ==
Perkins was raised a Jehovah's Witness. During his professional career, he stood away from his line of teammates for the national anthem due to his faith.

== NBA career statistics ==
Legend
GP	Games played	GS	Games started	MPG	Minutes per game
FG%	Field goal percentage	3P%	3-point field goal percentage	FT%	Free throw percentage
RPG	Rebounds per game	APG	Assists per game	SPG	Steals per game
BPG	Blocks per game	PPG	Points per game	**Bold**	Career high
*	Led the league

=== Regular season ===
Year	Team	GP	GS	MPG	FG%	3P%	FT%	RPG	APG	SPG	BPG	PPG
1984–85	Dallas	**82**	42	28.3	.471	.250	.820	7.4	1.6	.8	.8	11.0
1985–86	Dallas	80	79	32.8	.503	.333	.814	8.6	1.9	.9	**1.2**	15.4
1986–87	Dallas	80	**80**	33.6	.482	.352	.828	7.7	1.8	**1.4**	1.0	14.8
1987–88	Dallas	75	75	33.3	.450	.167	.822	8.0	1.6	1.0	.7	14.2
1988–89	Dallas	78	77	36.7	.464	.184	.833	**8.8**	1.6	1.0	**1.2**	15.0
1989–90	Dallas	76	70	35.1	.493	.214	.778	7.5	2.3	1.2	.8	15.9
1990–91	L.A. Lakers	76	66	34.3	.495	.281	.821	7.4	1.5	.9	1.1	13.5
1991–92	L.A. Lakers	63	63	**37.0**	.450	.217	.817	**8.8**	2.2	1.0	1.0	**16.5**
1992–93	L.A. Lakers	49	49	32.4	.459	.172	.829	7.7	**2.6**	.8	1.0	13.7
1992–93	Seattle	30	13	25.4	**.511**	**.452**	.795	4.8	.9	.7	1.0	12.1
1993–94	Seattle	81	41	26.8	.438	.367	.801	4.5	1.4	.8	4	12.3
1994–95	Seattle	**82***	37	28.7	.466	.397	.799	4.9	1.6	.9	.5	12.7
1995–96	Seattle	**82**	20	26.5	.408	.355	.793	4.5	1.5	1.0	.6	11.8
1996–97	Seattle	81	4	24.4	.439	.395	.817	3.7	1.3	.9	.6	11.0
1997–98	Seattle	81	0	20.7	.416	.392	.789	3.1	1.4	.8	.4	7.2
1998–99	Indiana	48	0	16.4	.400	.389	.717	2.9	.5	.3	.3	5.0
1999–00	Indiana	81	0	20.0	.417	.408	.825	3.6	.8	.4	.4	6.6
2000–01	Indiana	64	41	15.6	.381	.345	**.842**	2.6	.6	.5	.3	3.8
Career		1,286	757	28.5	.459	.362	.811	6.0	1.5	.9	.7	11.9

=== Playoffs ===
Perkins has the distinction of having the fourth-most playoff games appeared in without having been on a team that won the NBA Championship. The only players with more playoff appearances and zero rings, as of the 2025–26 NBA season, are Hall of Fame Utah Jazz teammates Karl Malone and John Stockton and current player James Harden.

Year	Team	GP	GS	MPG	FG%	3P%	FT%	RPG	APG	SPG	BPG	PPG
1985	Dallas	4	4	**42.3**	.490	.250	.765	**12.8**	2.8	.5	.3	**18.8**
1986	Dallas	10	10	34.7	.429	.250	.767	8.3	2.4	.9	**1.4**	14.9
1987	Dallas	4	4	17.0	.500	.000	.696	8.5	1.3	1.0	.3	17.0
1988	Dallas	17	17	33.6	.451	.143	.803	6.6	1.8	**1.5**	1.0	13.5
1990	Dallas	3	3	39.3	.444	.000	.765	7.3	2.7	1.0	.7	15.0
1991	L.A. Lakers	19	**19**	39.6	**.548**	.367	.761	8.3	1.7	.8	**1.4**	17.7
1993	Seattle	19	17	32.9	.436	.380	.873	7.0	1.9	1.0	1.3	14.4
1994	Seattle	5	0	28.2	.333	.429	.882	7.2	.8	.8	.4	9.8
1995	Seattle	4	1	35.3	.438	.455	**1.000**	7.8	**3.3**	.8	1.3	13.5
1996	Seattle	21	1	31.1	.459	.368	.754	4.3	1.7	.7	.3	12.3
1997	Seattle	12	6	28.3	.337	.311	.862	4.4	1.3	1.0	1.0	8.4
1998	Seattle	10	1	21.0	.381	.417	.600	3.2	1.4	.3	.5	5.4
1999	Indiana	13	0	11.2	.514	**.458**	.667	1.9	.5	.0	.2	4.1
2000	Indiana	**23**	0	18.1	.324	.348	.905	3.2	.4	.2	.3	4.8
2001	Indiana	3	0	6.3	.250	.250	–	1.3	.0	.0	.0	1.7
Career		167	83	28.7	.444	.363	.785	5.6	1.5	.7	.8	11.1

== See also ==
- List of NCAA Division I men's basketball players with 2,000 points and 1,000 rebounds
- List of National Basketball Association career games played leaders
