= Fresno State Bulldogs men's basketball statistical leaders =

The Fresno State Bulldogs men's basketball statistical leaders are individual statistical leaders of the Fresno State Bulldogs men's basketball program in various categories, including points, assists, blocks, rebounds, and steals. Within those areas, the lists identify single-game, single-season, and career leaders. The Bulldogs represent Fresno State University in the NCAA's Pac-12 Conference.

Fresno State began competing in intercollegiate basketball in 1955.

The NCAA did not officially record assists as a stat until the 1983–84 season, and blocks and steals until the 1985–86 season, but Fresno State's record books includes players in these stats before these seasons. These lists are updated through the end of the 2021–22 season.

== Scoring ==
Career
Rk	Player	Points	Seasons
1	Marvelle Harris	2031	2012–13 2013–14 2014–15 2015–16
2	Melvin Ely	1951	1998–99 1999–00 2000–01 2001–02
3	Wilbert Hooker	1739	1988–89 1989–90 1990–91 1991–92
4	Terrance Roberson	1690	1996–97 1997–98 1998–99 1999–00
5	Carl Ray Harris	1584	1990–91 1991–92 1993–94
6	Deshon Taylor	1482	2016–17 2017–18 2018–19
7	Jervis Cole	1479	1985–86 1986–87 1987–88 1988–89
8	Bernard Thompson	1452	1980–81 1981–82 1982–83 1983–84
9	Tod Bernard	1426	1989–90 1990–91 1991–92
10	Orlando Robinson	1415	2019–20 2020–21 2021–22

Season
Rk	Player	Points	Season
1	Marvelle Harris	725	2015–16
2	Orlando Robinson	700	2021–22
3	Carl Ray Harris	694	1993–94
4	Courtney Alexander	684	1998–99
5	Courtney Alexander	669	1999–00
6	Melvin Ely	653	2001–02
7	Kendric Brooks	640	1995–96
8	Lucius Harris	597	1969–70
9	Jerry Pender	588	1970–71
	Kevin Olekaibe	588	2011–12

Single game
Rk	Player	Points	Season	Opponent
1	Kevin Olekaibe	43	2011–12	Seattle
	Jemarl Baker	43	2022–23	Chicago State
3	Marvelle Harris	40	2014–15	Nevada
4	Marvelle Harris	37	2015–16	UNLV
	Deshon Taylor	37	2018–19	San Jose State
6	Quinton Hosley	35	2005–06	Nevada
7	Marvelle Harris	34	2015–16	Utah State
	Braxton Huggins	34	2018–19	San Jose State
	Orlando Robinson	34	2021–22	Wyoming
10	Braxton Huggins	33	2018–19	Utah State
	Orlando Robinson	33	2020–21	Wyoming
	Jake Heidbreder	33	2025–26	New Orleans

== Rebounds ==
Career
Rk	Player	Rebounds	Seasons
1	Melvin Ely	924	1998–99 1999–00 2000–01 2001–02
2	Larry Abney	771	1997–98 1998–99 1999–00
3	Nate Grimes	742	2016–17 2017–18 2018–19 2019–20
4	Orlando Robinson	719	2019–20 2020–21 2021–22
5	Gary Alcorn	712	1956–57 1957–58
6	Len Brown	706	1955–56 1956–57 1957–58
7	Lee Mayberry	704	1991–92 1992–93 1993–94
8	Derrick Barden	670	1985–86 1986–87 1987–88 1988–89
9	Terrance Roberson	642	1996–97 1997–98 1998–99 1999–00
10	Héctor Hernández	631	2004–05 2005–06 2006–07 2007–08

Season
Rk	Player	Rebounds	Season
1	Larry Abney	402	1999–00
2	Tremaine Fowlkes	359	1997–98
3	Gary Alcorn	358	1956–57
4	Gary Alcorn	354	1957–58
5	Lee Mayberry	284	1993–94
6	Dominic McGuire	314	2006–07
7	Larry Henricksen	303	1969–70
8	Orlando Robinson	301	2021–22
9	Nate Grimes	286	2018–19
10	Quinton Hosley	284	2006–07

Single game
Rk	Player	Rebounds	Season	Opponent
1	Dreike Bouldin	23	2004–05	Louisiana Tech
2	Greg Smith	20	2010–11	Nevada
3	Nate Grimes	19	2018–19	New Mexico
	Wilson Jacques	19	2025–26	San Jose State
5	Orlando Robinson	18	2021–22	Long Island
6	Quinton Hosley	17	2005–06	Utah State
	Nate Grimes	17	2017–18	Cal State Monterey Bay
8	Quinton Hosley	16	2006–07	Idaho
	Greg Smith	16	2010–11	Hawaii
	Nate Grimes	16	2018–19	San Diego State
	Orlando Robinson	16	2020–21	New Mexico
	Enoch Boakye	16	2023–24	UC Santa Barbara

== Assists ==
Career
Rk	Player	Assists	Seasons
1	Kevin Bell	599	2004–05 2005–06 2006–07 2007–08
2	Dominick Young	598	1994–95 1995–96 1996–97
3	Isaiah Hill	505	2020–21 2021–22 2022–23 2023–24
4	Chris Herren	465	1996–97 1997–98 1998–99
5	Demetrius Porter	454	1997–98 1998–99 1999–00 2000–01
6	Mitch Arnold	420	1981–82 1982–83 1983–84 1984–85
7	Marvelle Harris	396	2012–13 2013–14 2014–15 2015–16
8	Steven Shepp	395	2009–10 2010–11 2011–12
9	Brian Santiago	354	1992–93 1993–94
10	Wilbert Hooker	344	1988–89 1989–90 1990–91 1991–92

Season
Rk	Player	Assists	Season
1	Rafer Alston	240	1997–98
2	Brian Santiago	223	1993–94
3	Dominick Young	211	1996–97
4	Dave Barnett	208	1990–91
5	Demetrius Porter	206	1999–00
6	Tito Maddox	200	2000–01
7	Dominick Young	197	1994–95
8	Isaiah Hill	193	2023–24
9	Dominick Young	190	1995–96
10	Kevin Bell	187	2007–08

Single game
Rk	Player	Assists	Season	Opponent
1	Kevin Bell	13	2006–07	Cal Poly
2	Kevin Bell	11	2005–06	Buffalo
	Kevin Bell	11	2006–07	Boise State
	Steven Shepp	11	2011–12	Hawaii
	Steven Shepp	11	2011–12	Nevada
6	Tito Maddox	10	2000–01	California
	Kevin Bell	10	2005–06	San Francisco
	Kevin Bell	10	2006–07	New Mexico
	Dominic McGuire	10	2006–07	Georgia
	Kevin Bell	10	2007–08	Montana State
	Steven Shepp	10	2009–10	San Jose State
	Tyler Johnson	10	2010–11	Seattle
	Steven Shepp	10	2011–12	Texas-San Antonio
	Marvelle Harris	10	2014–15	Saint Katherine
	Marvelle Harris	10	2015–16	New Mexico
	Deshon Taylor	10	2018–19	Air Force
	Isaiah Hill	10	2022–23	Chicago State
	Isaiah Hill	10	2023–24	Utah State
	Isaiah Hill	10	2023–24	Air Force
	Isaiah Hill	10	2023–24	San Jose State

== Steals ==
Career
Rk	Player	Steals	Seasons
1	Dominick Young	227	1994–95 1995–96 1996–97
2	Marvelle Harris	207	2012–13 2013–14 2014–15 2015–16
3	Dominick Young	199	1997–98 1998–99 1999–00 2000–01
4	Wilbert Hooker	182	1988–89 1989–90 1990–91 1991–92
5	Terrance Roberson	173	1996–97 1997–98 1998–99 1999–00
6	Mike Mitchell	167	1985–86 1986–87 1987–88
7	Bernard Thompson	151	1980–81 1981–82 1982–83 1983–84
	Kevin Bell	151	2004–05 2005–06 2006–07 2007–08
9	Donald Mason	148	1978–79 1979–80 1980–81 1981–82
	Travis Demanby	148	1999–00 2000–01 2001–02 2002–03

Season
Rk	Player	Steals	Season
1	Dominick Young	81	1994–95
2	Marvelle Harris	76	2015–16
3	Dominick Young	74	1995–96
4	Dominick Young	72	1996–97
5	Jaron Hopkins	71	2016–17
6	Rafer Alston	70	1997–98
7	Bijou Baly	68	1989–90
8	Dave Barnett	66	1990–91
9	Mike Mitchell	65	1986–87
	Demetrius Porter	65	1999–00
	Marvelle Harris	65	2014–15

Single game
Rk	Player	Steals	Season	Opponent
1	Kevin Bell	9	2006–07	Hawaii
2	Quinton Hosley	7	2005–06	New Mexico State
	Jaron Hopkins	7	2017–18	Weber State
4	Quinton Hosley	6	2005–06	Oregon State
	Paul George	6	2009–10	BYU
	Paul George	6	2009–10	UC Davis
	Steven Shepp	6	2009–10	Hawaii
	Julien Lewis	6	2014–15	San Jose State
	Marvelle Harris	6	2015–16	San Diego State
	Cullen Russo	6	2015–16	Utah
	Jaron Hopkins	6	2016–17	Drake
	Zaon Collins	6	2024–25	UC Santa Barbara
	Elijah Price	6	2024–25	New Mexico

== Blocks ==
Career
Rk	Player	Blocks	Seasons
1	Melvin Ely	361	1998–99 1999–00 2000–01 2001–02
2	Karachi Edo	148	2013–14 2014–15 2015–16 2016–17
3	Mustafa El-Sayad	140	2000–01 2001–02 2002–03 2003–04 2004–05
4	Derrick Barden	132	1985–86 1986–87 1987–88 1988–89
5	Rahsaan Smith	130	1994–95 1995–96 1996–97
6	Nate Grimes	129	2016–17 2017–18 2018–19 2019–20
7	Rod Higgins	122	1978–79 1979–80 1980–81 1981–82
8	Lee Mayberry	117	1991–92 1992–93 1993–94
9	Dominic McGuire	114	2006–07
10	Noel Felix	110	1999–00 2000–01 2001–02 2002–03

Season
Rk	Player	Blocks	Season
1	Dominic McGuire	114	2006–07
2	Melvin Ely	92	1999–00
3	Melvin Ely	91	1998–99
4	Melvin Ely	90	2000–01
5	Melvin Ely	88	2001–02
6	Avondre Jones	75	1997–98
7	Alex Davis	72	2013–24
8	Rahsaan Smith	71	1995–96
9	Mustafa El-Sayad	70	2004–05
10	Dimitri Lambrecht	59	1990–91

Single game
Rk	Player	Blocks	Season	Opponent
1	Mustafa El-Sayad	11	2004–05	Buffalo
2	Dominic McGuire	10	2006–07	San Diego
3	Mustafa El-Sayad	7	2004–05	Tulsa
	Dominic McGuire	7	2006–07	Creighton
	Dominic McGuire	7	2006–07	Idaho
	Dominic McGuire	7	2006–07	Boise State
7	Dominic McGuire	6	2006–07	Louisiana Tech
	Robert Upshaw	6	2012–13	Washington State
	Alex Davis	6	2013–14	Siena
	Alex Davis	6	2014–15	San Diego State
