= 1980–81 UC Irvine Anteaters men's basketball team =

American college basketball season

1980–81 UC Irvine Anteaters men's basketball

KOA tournament champions
- Conference: Pacific Coast Athletic Association
- Record: 17–10 (9–5 PCAA)
- Head coach: Bill Mulligan (1st season)
- Assistant coach: Bob Shermerhorn
- Home arena: Crawford Hall

1980–81 Pacific Coast Athletic Association men's basketball standings
	Conf.				Overall
Team	W		L	PCT	W		L	PCT
Fresno State†	12	–	2	.857	25	–	4	.862
San Jose State	10	–	4	.714	21	–	9	.700
UC Irvine	9	–	5	.643	17	–	10	.630
Long Beach State	9	–	5	.643	15	–	13	.536
Utah State	5	–	9	.357	12	–	16	.429
UC Santa Barbara	5	–	9	.357	11	–	16	.407
Pacific	4	–	10	.286	14	–	13	.519
Cal State Fullerton	2	–	12	.143	4	–	23	.148
† 1981 PCAA tournament winner

The 1980–81 UC Irvine Anteaters men's basketball team represented the University of California, Irvine during the 1980–81 NCAA Division I men's basketball season. The Anteaters were led by first year head coach Bill Mulligan and played their home games at the Crawford Hall. They were members of the Pacific Coast Athletic Association. They finished the season 17–10 and 9–5 in PCAA play.

== Previous season ==
The 1979–80 Anteaters finished the season with a record of 9–18 and 1–13 in PCAA play. They anteaters were invited to the PCAA tournament where they lost in the first round against the Long Beach State 49ers. Coach Tim Tift announced his resignation as coach of the anteaters with 6 games remaining in the season. Saddleback College coach Bill Mulligan was announced as the new coach on March 1.

== Off-season ==
=== Incoming transfers ===
Name	Pos.	Height	Weight	Year	Hometown	Notes
Ray Donnelly	F	6'6"	N/A	Jr.	N/A	Transfer from Arizona
Kevin Fuller	G	6'3"	N/A	Jr.	N/A	Junior College transfer from Long Beach City College(CA)
Leonard Johnson	G	6'3"	N/A	Jr.	N/A	Transfer from Utah
Kevin Magee	F	6'8"	N/A	Jr.	Gary, Indiana	Junior college transfer from Saddleback College(CA)
Grant Taylor	F	6'8"	N/A	Jr.	N/A	Junior College transfer from Cypress College(CA)
Randy Whieldon	G	6'4"	N/A	Jr.	N/A	Junior College transfer from Saddleback College(CA)
Jason Works	G	5'10"	N/A	Jr.	N/A	Junior College transfer from Los Angeles City College

=== 1980 recruiting class ===
College recruiting (1980)
Name	Hometown	School	Height	Weight	Commit date
Ben McDonald; F	N/A	Long Beach Poly (CA)	6 ft 8 in (2.03 m)	N/A	
Ben McDonald; F	Recruit ratings: No ratings found				
Curtis Crossley; F	N/A	Eastridge High School (IL)	6 ft 7 in (2.01 m)	N/A	
Curtis Crossley; F	Recruit ratings: No ratings found				
Overall recruit ranking:
Note: In many cases, Scout, Rivals, 247Sports, On3, and ESPN may conflict in their listings of height and weight.; In these cases, the average was taken. ESPN grades are on a 100-point scale.; Sources:

== Roster ==
1980–81 UC Irvine Anteaters men's basketball team
Players
Coaches

Pos.	#	Name	Height	Weight	Year	Hometown
F		Don Barnes	6 ft 7 in (2.01 m)	—	So
G		Robbie Beal	6 ft 3 in (1.91 m)	—	Jr
G		Louis Bremond	6 ft 0 in (1.83 m)	—	Jr
G		Kevin Fuller	6 ft 3 in (1.91 m)	—	Jr
F		Scott Hartman	6 ft 8 in (2.03 m)	—	Jr
F		Kevin Magee	6 ft 8 in (2.03 m)	—	Jr	Gary, Indiana
F		Ben McDonald	6 ft 8 in (2.03 m)	—	Fr	Torrance, California
F		Grant Taylor	6 ft 8 in (2.03 m)	—	Jr
G		Randy Whieldon	6 ft 4 in (1.93 m)	—	Jr
G		Jason Works	5 ft 10 in (1.78 m)	—	Jr
F		Rainer Wulf	6 ft 6 in (1.98 m)	—	Jr

Head coach

Bill Mulligan

Assistant coach(es)

- Bob Shermerhorn

Legend

- (C) Team captain
- (S) Suspended
- (I) Ineligible
- (W) Walk-on
- Injured
- Current redshirt

Roster
Last update: July 24, 2017

== Schedule ==
Date time, TV	Rank^{#}	Opponent^{#}	Result	Record	Site (attendance) city, state
Non-Conference Season
November 28, 1980*		VMI	W 125–96	1–0	Crawford Hall (1,348); Irvine, CA
December 6, 1980*		at UNLV	L 95–124	1–1	Las Vegas Convention Center (6.380); Winchester, NV
December 11, 1980*		Chicago Circle	W 98–61	2–1	Crawford Hall (1,294); Irvine, CA
December 13, 1980*		at Stanford	L 84–98	2–2	Maples Pavilion (2,393); Stanford, CA
December 15, 1980*		Western Washington	W 110–82	3–2	Crawford Hall (831); Irvine, CA
December 19, 1980*		vs. San Francisco; Golden Gate Invitational	L 83–93	3–3	War Memorial Gymnasium (3,695); San Francisco, CA
December 20, 1980*		vs. Miami(OH); Golden Gate Invitational	L 99–109	3–4	War Memorial Gymnasium (4,295); San Francisco, CA
December 22, 1980*		UMKC	W 110–71	4–4	Crawford Hall (924); Irvine, CA
December 29, 1980*		vs. No. 11 Texas A&M; KOA Classic	W 91–74	5–4	MetraPark Arena (5,625); Billings, MT
December 30, 1980*		vs. Montana; KOA Classic	W 65–63 ^{OT}	6–4	MetraPark Arena (4,673); Billings, MT
January 3, 1981*		Portland State	W 90–64	7–4	Crawford Hall (1,543); Irvine, CA
January 10, 1981*		San Diego	W 108–62	8–4	Crawford Hall (1,611); Irvine, CA
Conference Season
January 15, 1981		Cal State Fullerton	W 99–84	9–4 (1–0)	Crawford Hall (1,676); Irvine, CA
January 17, 1981		UC Santa Barbara	W 65–56	10–4 (2–0)	Crawford Hall (1,608); Irvine, CA
January 22, 1981		at Pacific	W 88–72	11–4 (3–0)	Stockton Memorial Civic Auditorium (3,059); Stockton, CA
January 24, 1981		at Fresno State	L 51–64	11–5 (3–1)	Selland Arena (6,530); Fresno, CA
January 29, 1981		at Long Beach State	L 59–70	11–6 (3–2)	Long Beach Arena (6,147); Long Beach, CA
January 31, 1981		Long Beach State	L 78–82	11–7 (3–3)	Crawford Hall (1,719); Irvine, CA
February 5, 1981		San Jose State	W 90–78	12–7 (4–3)	Crawford Hall (1,421); Irvine, CA
February 7, 1981		Utah State	W 117–110 ^{2OT}	13–7 (5–3)	Crawford Hall (1,557); Irvine, CA
February 12, 1981		at Utah State	W 101–99	14–7 (6–3)	Smith Spectrum (6,477); Logan, UT
February 14, 1981		at San Jose State	W 50–49	15–7 (7–3)	Spartan Gym (2,412); San Jose, CA
February 19, 1981		Fresno State	L 55–70	15–8 (7–4)	Crawford Hall (1,663); Irvine, CA
February 21, 1981		Pacific	W 90–82	16–8 (8–4)	Crawford Hall (1,472); Irvine, CA
February 26, 1981		at UC Santa Barbara	L 66–67	16–9 (8–5)	UC Santa Barbara Events Center (2,274); Santa Barbara, CA
February 28, 1981		at Cal State Fullerton	W 75–69	17–9 (9–5)	Titan Gym (2,912); Fullerton, CA
PCAA tournament
March 5, 1981		vs. Utah State; Quarterfinals	L 90–93	17–10	Anaheim Convention Center (6,269); Anaheim, CA
*Non-conference game. ^{#}Rankings from AP Poll. (#) Tournament seedings in parentheses. All times are in Pacific Time.

== Awards and honors ==
- Kevin Magee
  - AP First Team All-American
  - PCAA Player of the Year
  - PCAA First Team All-Conference
- Ben McDonald
  - PCAA Freshman of the Year
  - PCAA All-Freshman Team
