= Melvin Johnson III =

American basketball player (born 1990)

Yakima Sun Kings
- Position: Shooting guard / small forward
- League: North American Premier Basketball

Personal information
- Born: May 20, 1990 (age 36) Dallas, Texas, U.S.
- Listed height: 6 ft 6 in (1.98 m)
- Listed weight: 170 lb (77 kg)

Career information
- High school: Christian Life Center (Humble, Texas)
- College: UTSA (2009–2012); Arkansas State (2013–2014)
- NBA draft: 2014: undrafted
- Playing career: 2014–present

Career history
- 2014–2015: Delaware 87ers
- 2015: Reno Bighorns
- 2015–2016: Raptors 905
- 2016: Texas Legends
- 2016: Maine Red Claws
- 2016: Grand Rapids Drive
- 2018: Yakima Sun Kings

Career highlights
- Third-team All-Sun Belt (2014); Third-team All-Southland (2012); Southland Freshman of the Year (2010)

Melvin Johnson III (born May 20, 1990) is an American professional basketball player for the Yakima SunKings of the North American Premier Basketball. He played college basketball for UTSA and Arkansas State.

== High school career ==
Johnson attended Christian Life Center Academy in Humble, Texas under coach Carlos Wilson. He averaged 23.0 points and 4.5 rebounds per game as a senior and led his team to the 2009 National Association of Christian Athletes (NACA) Boys Elite Division I National Basketball Championship, earning NACA All-Tournament Team recognition.

== College career ==
In his freshman season at UTSA, Johnson played in 28 games and averaged 7.7 points and 1.7 rebounds per game, while shooting 38.9% from the field, 42.5% from three-point range, and 86.5% from the free throw line. He subsequently won the Southland Freshman of the Year award. As a sophomore, he played in 34 games (21 starts) and averaged 14.9 points and 3.5 rebounds per game, while shooting 41.7% from the field, 37% from three-point range, and 85.9% from the free throw line. He subsequently earned All-Southland Honorable Mention honors after the season. As a junior, he played in 30 games (22 starts) and averaged 13.1 points, 3.4 rebounds and 1.2 assists per game, while shooting 46.3% from the field, 43.4% from three-point range, and 83.9% from the free throw line. He subsequently earned third-team All-Southland honors after the season.

In June 2012, Johnson transferred to Arkansas State University to play for the Red Wolves. Due to NCAA transfer regulations, he was forced to sit out the 2012–13 season.

As a senior at Arkansas State, Johnson was a key contributor for the Red Wolves. He averaged 15.2 points, 4.4 rebounds and 1.3 assists per game, while shooting 47.3% from the field, 47.8% from three-point range, and 75.9% from the free throw line. He subsequently earned third-team All-Sun Belt honors after the season.

== Professional career ==
=== 2014–15 season ===
On November 1, 2014, Johnson was selected by the Santa Cruz Warriors with the 13th overall pick in the 2014 NBA Development League Draft. He was later traded to the Delaware 87ers on draft night. On January 21, 2015, he was traded by the 87ers to the Reno Bighorns in exchange for Joonas Caven. He played out the 2014–15 season with Reno, and in 37 D-League games during the season (21 for Delaware, 16 for Reno), he averaged 9.7 points and 2.6 rebounds per game.

=== 2015–16 season ===
On October 31, 2015, Johnson was selected by new franchise Raptors 905 in the third round of the 2015 NBA Development League Draft. On November 14, he made his debut for Raptors 905 in an 83–80 loss to the Fort Wayne Mad Ants, recording 12 points, one rebound and one steal in 20 minutes.

On March 4, 2016, Johnson was traded by Raptors 905 to the Texas Legends in exchange for a 2016 fourth-round draft pick. The next day, he made his debut for Texas in a 127–117 loss to the Los Angeles D-Fenders, recording nine points, three rebounds and an assist in seven minutes off the bench. On March 10, he was waived by the Legends.

On March 16, Johnson was acquired by the Maine Red Claws. He managed just one game for Maine before being waived by the team on March 29. Three days later, he was acquired by the Grand Rapids Drive. The next day, he made his debut for Grand Rapids in a 107–106 loss to the Sioux Falls Skyforce, recording 11 points, three rebounds and one steal in 24 minutes.

== Personal life ==
Johnson is the son of Melvin Jr. and Latricia Johnson, and has two sisters. He majored in business administration.
