= 1981–82 UC Irvine Anteaters men's basketball team =

American college basketball season

1981–82 UC Irvine Anteaters men's basketball

Champion Holiday Classic Champions
- Conference: Pacific Coast Athletic Association
- Record: 23–7 (10–4 PCAA)
- Head coach: Bill Mulligan (2nd season)
- Assistant coaches: Bob Schermerhorn; Mike Bokosky; Herb Livsey
- Home arena: Crawford Hall

1981–82 Pacific Coast Athletic Association men's basketball standings
	Conf.				Overall
Team	W		L	PCT	W		L	PCT
No. 11 Fresno State†	13	–	1	.929	27	–	3	.900
UC Irvine	10	–	4	.714	23	–	7	.767
Cal State Fullerton	9	–	5	.643	18	–	14	.563
San Jose State	7	–	7	.500	13	–	13	.500
Long Beach State	7	–	7	.500	12	–	16	.429
UC Santa Barbara	5	–	9	.357	10	–	16	.385
Pacific	3	–	11	.214	7	–	20	.259
Utah State	2	–	12	.143	4	–	23	.148
† 1982 PCAA tournament winner

The 1981–82 UC Irvine Anteaters men's basketball team represented the University of California, Irvine during the 1981–82 NCAA Division I men's basketball season. The Anteaters were led by second year head coach Bill Mulligan and played their home games at the Crawford Hall. They were members of the Pacific Coast Athletic Association. They finished the season 23–7 and 10–4 in PCAA play.

== Previous season ==
Under first year coach Bill Mulligan, the 1979–80 Anteaters archived their first winning season as a division 1 program with a record of 17–10 and was 3rd in conference play with a record of 9–5. The anteaters averaged 86.4 points per game and led the country in scoring.

== Off-season ==
=== Incoming transfers ===
Name	Pos.	Height	Weight	Year	Hometown	Notes
Curtis Crossley	F	6'7"	220	So.	N/A	Junior College transfer from Saddleback College
Don Kapener	N/A	N/A	N/A	Jr.	N/A	Transfer from San Diego
Bob Thornton	C	6'8"	N/A	Jr.	N/A	Junior College transfer from Saddleback College

=== 1981 recruiting class ===
College recruiting (1981)
Name	Hometown	School	Height	Weight	Commit date
John Barkey; G	N/A	Troy High School (CA)	5 ft 10 in (1.78 m)	N/A	
John Barkey; G	Recruit ratings: No ratings found				
Mark Spinn; F	N/A	Corona del Mar High School (CA)	6 ft 7 in (2.01 m)	N/A	
Mark Spinn; F	Recruit ratings: No ratings found				
Rick Ciaccio; F	N/A	Newport Harbor High School (CA)	6 ft 9 in (2.06 m)	N/A	
Rick Ciaccio; F	Recruit ratings: No ratings found				
Overall recruit ranking:
Note: In many cases, Scout, Rivals, 247Sports, On3, and ESPN may conflict in their listings of height and weight.; In these cases, the average was taken. ESPN grades are on a 100-point scale.; Sources:

== Roster ==
1981–82 UC Irvine Anteaters men's basketball team
Players
Coaches

Pos.	#	Name	Height	Weight	Year	Hometown
G		John Barkey	5 ft 10 in (1.78 m)	—	Fr
F		Rick Ciaccio	6 ft 9 in (2.06 m)	—	Fr
F		Curtis Crossley	6 ft 7 in (2.01 m)	—	So
G		Kevin Fuller	6 ft 3 in (1.91 m)	—	Sr
G		Leonard Johnson	6 ft 3 in (1.91 m)	—	Jr
C	44	Kevin Magee	6 ft 8 in (2.03 m)	—	Sr	Gary, Indiana
F		Ben McDonald	6 ft 8 in (2.03 m)	—	So	Torrance, California
C		Bob Thornton	6 ft 8 in (2.03 m)	—	So
G		Randy Whieldon	6 ft 4 in (1.93 m)	—	Sr
F		Rainer Wulf	6 ft 7 in (2.01 m)	—	Sr
C		Grant Taylor	6 ft 8 in (2.03 m)	—	Sr

Head coach

Bill Mulligan

Assistant coach(es)

- Bob Shermerhorn
- Mike Bokosky
- Herb Livsey

Legend

- (C) Team captain
- (S) Suspended
- (I) Ineligible
- (W) Walk-on
- Injured
- Current redshirt

Roster
Last update: July 30, 2017

== Schedule ==
Date time, TV	Rank^{#}	Opponent^{#}	Result	Record	Site (attendance) city, state
Non-Conference Season
November 28, 1981*		at Oregon	W 90–84	1–0	McArthur Court (6,6652); Eugene, OR
November 30, 1981*		at Chico State	W 118–79	2–0	Art Acker Gymnasium (2,500); Chico, CA
December 3, 1981*		Boise State	W 84–72	3–0	Crawford Hall (1,403); Irvine, CA
December 6, 1981*		at San Diego	W 78–66	4–0	USD Sports Center (2,500); San Diego, CA
December 10, 1981*		Hawaii-Hilo	W 116–70	5–0	Crawford Hall (1,472); Irvine, CA
December 12, 1981*		No. 15 UNLV	W 82–70	6–0	Anaheim Convention Center (6,959); Anaheim, CA
December 15, 1981*		Loyola Marymount	W 91–80	7–0	Crawford Hall (1,549); Irvine, CA
December 18, 1981*		vs. Eastern Michigan; Champion Holiday Classic	W 76–59	8–0	Dahlberg Arena (5,300); Missoula, MT
December 19, 1981*		vs. Montana; Champion Holiday Classic	W 46–44	9–0	Dahlberg Arena (6,154); Missoula, MT
December 28, 1981*		vs. Arizona State; Milwaukee Classic	L 73–88	9–1	Milwaukee Arena (10,214); Milwaukee, WI
December 29, 1981*		vs. East Tennessee State; Milwaukee Classic	W 77–75	10–1	Milwaukee Arena (10,652); Milwaukee, WI
January 6, 1982*		Drury	W 107–71	11–1	Crawford Hall (1,494); Irvine, CA
Conference Season
January 14, 1982		Cal State Fullerton	W 50–49	12–1 (1–0)	Crawford Hall (1,676); Irvine, CA
January 16, 1982		UC Santa Barbara	W 65–62	13–1 (2–0)	Crawford Hall (1,591); Irvine, CA
January 21, 1982		at Pacific	W 71–64	14–1 (3–0)	Alex G. Spanos Center (3,727); Stockton, CA
January 23, 1982		at Utah State	W 71–68	15–1 (4–0)	Smith Spectrum (6,674); Logan, UT
January 28, 1982		at Long Beach State	W 78–68	16–1 (5–0)	Long Beach Arena (5,396); Long Beach, CA
January 30, 1982		Long Beach State	W 78–68	17–1 (6–0)	Anaheim Convention Center (5,479); Anaheim, CA
February 4, 1982		San Jose State	L 57–58	17–2 (6–1)	Crawford Hall (1,578); Irvine, CA
February 7, 1982		Fresno State	L 49–55 ^{OT}	17–3 (6–2)	Long Beach Arena (8,456); Long Beach, CA
February 11, 1982		at San Jose State	W 68–61	18–3 (7–2)	San Jose Civic Auditorium (2,900); San Jose, CA
February 13, 1982		at Fresno State	L 58–71	18–4 (7–3)	Selland Arena (6,530); Fresno, CA
February 18, 1982		Pacific	W 92–70	19–4 (8–3)	Crawford Hall (1,329); Irvine, CA
February 20, 1982		Utah State	W 104–72	20–4 (9–3)	Crawford Hall (1,594); Irvine, CA
February 25, 1982		at Cal State Fullerton	L 62–68 ^{3OT}	20–5 (9–4)	Titan Gym (3,096); Fullerton, CA
February 27, 1982		at UC Santa Barbara	W 79–77	21–5 (10–4)	UC Santa Barbara Events Center (4,100); Santa Barbara, CA
PCAA tournament
March 3, 1982	(2)	vs. (7) Utah State; Quarterfinals	W 90–64	22–5	Anaheim Convention Center (5,400); Anaheim, CA
March 4, 1982	(2)	vs. (3) Cal State Fullerton; Semifinals	L 61–64	22–6	Anaheim Convention Center (7,433); Anaheim, CA
NIT
March 12, 1982*		vs. San Diego State; First Round	W 70–69	23–6	San Diego Sports Arena (8,114); San Diego, CA
March 16, 1982*		at Oklahoma; Second Round	L 77–880	23–7	Lloyd Noble Center (11,187); Norman, OK
*Non-conference game. ^{#}Rankings from AP Poll. (#) Tournament seedings in parentheses. All times are in Pacific Time.

== Awards and honors ==
- Kevin Magee
  - AP First Team All-American
  - USBWA First Team All-American
  - NABC Second Team All-American
  - PCAA Player of the Year
  - PCAA First Team All-Conference
- Ben McDonald
  - PCAA Second Team All-Conference

== Team players drafted into the NBA ==
Round	Pick	Player	NBA Club
2	39	Kevin Magee	Phoenix Suns
10	215	Grant Taylor	Portland Trail Blazers
10	219	Randy Whieldon	Golden State Warriors
