= 2007 WAC men's basketball tournament =

Men's Basketball tournament of WAC 2007

- Classification: Division I
- Season: 2006–07
- Teams: 9
- Site: Pan American Center; Las Cruces, New Mexico
- Champions: New Mexico State (1st title)
- Winning coach: Reggie Theus (1st title)
- MVP: Justin Hawkins (New Mexico State)

2006–07 WAC men's basketball standings
	Conf.				Overall
Team	W		L	PCT	W		L	PCT
No. 15 Nevada	14	–	2	.875	29	–	5	.853
New Mexico State †	11	–	5	.688	25	–	9	.735
Fresno State	10	–	6	.625	22	–	10	.688
Utah State	9	–	7	.563	23	–	12	.657
Hawaii	8	–	8	.500	18	–	13	.581
Boise State	8	–	8	.500	17	–	14	.548
Louisiana Tech	7	–	9	.438	10	–	20	.333
San Jose State	4	–	12	.250	5	–	25	.167
Idaho	1	–	15	.063	4	–	27	.129
† 2007 WAC tournament winner Rankings from AP poll

The 2007 WAC men's basketball tournament was March 6–10 in the Pan American Center in Las Cruces, New Mexico. The winners of the tournament were the second-seeded New Mexico State Aggies, the host team. Regular season champion #10 Nevada was upset in the semifinals by Utah State.

In the NCAA tournament, New Mexico State was seeded #13 in the East region and lost in the first round; Nevada was the #7 seed in the South region and advanced to the second round.

Fresno State and Utah State made the National Invitation Tournament (NIT), but both lost road games in the first round.

== Bracket ==
First round Tuesday, March 6
8	San Jose State	49
9	Idaho	50

Quarterfinals; Thursday, March 8
1	#10 Nevada	88
9	Idaho	56
4	Utah State	73
5	Hawaii	70
2	New Mexico State	77
7	Louisiana Tech	70
3	Fresno State	73
6	Boise State	77

Semifinals; Friday, March 9
1	#10 Nevada	77
4	Utah State	79
2	New Mexico State	88
6	Boise State	69

Final; Saturday, March 10
4	Utah State	70
2	New Mexico State	72
