= 1981 Pacific Coast Athletic Association men's basketball tournament =

- Classification: Division I
- Season: 1980–81
- Teams: 7
- Site: Anaheim Convention Center; Anaheim, CA
- Champions: Fresno State (1st title)
- Winning coach: Boyd Grant (1st title)
- MVP: Sid Williams (Fresno State)
- Pacific Coast Athletic Association men's basketball tournaments

1980–81 Pacific Coast Athletic Association men's basketball standings
	Conf.				Overall
Team	W		L	PCT	W		L	PCT
Fresno State†	12	–	2	.857	25	–	4	.862
San Jose State	10	–	4	.714	21	–	9	.700
UC Irvine	9	–	5	.643	17	–	10	.630
Long Beach State	9	–	5	.643	15	–	13	.536
Utah State	5	–	9	.357	12	–	16	.429
UC Santa Barbara	5	–	9	.357	11	–	16	.407
Pacific	4	–	10	.286	14	–	13	.519
Cal State Fullerton	2	–	12	.143	4	–	23	.148
† 1981 PCAA tournament winner

The 1981 Pacific Coast Athletic Association men's basketball tournament (now known as the Big West Conference men's basketball tournament) was held March 5–7 at the Anaheim Convention Center in Anaheim, California.

Top-seeded Fresno State topped defending champions San José State in the title game, 52–48, to win the Bulldogs' first PCAA/Big West men's basketball tournament.

The Bulldogs, in turn, received a bid to the 1981 NCAA tournament, their first-ever appearance.

== Format ==
The format remained the same as 1979, with seven teams in the field. PCAA member UC Santa Barbara did not participate.

Withseven teams participating, the top-seeded team was given a bye into the semifinals while the remaining six teams were entered into the first round and seeded based on regular season conference records.

== Bracket ==
First round Thursday, March 5
5	Utah State	93
4	UC Irvine	90
3	Long Beach State	83
6	Pacific	77
7	Cal State Fullerton	54
2	San José State	63

Semifinals; Friday, March 6
1	Fresno State	71
5	Utah State	57
3	Long Beach State	50
2	San Jose State	64

Championship; Saturday, March 7
1	Fresno State	52
2	San Jose State	48
