= 2006–07 Nevada Wolf Pack men's basketball team =

American college basketball season

2006–07 Nevada Wolf Pack men's basketball

WAC Regular season champion

NCAA tournament, second round
- Conference: Western Athletic Conference

Ranking
- Coaches: No. 21
- AP: No. 15
- Record: 29–5 (14–2 WAC)
- Head coach: Mark Fox (3rd season)
- Home arena: Lawlor Events Center

2006–07 WAC men's basketball standings
	Conf.				Overall
Team	W		L	PCT	W		L	PCT
No. 15 Nevada	14	–	2	.875	29	–	5	.853
New Mexico State †	11	–	5	.688	25	–	9	.735
Fresno State	10	–	6	.625	22	–	10	.688
Utah State	9	–	7	.563	23	–	12	.657
Hawaii	8	–	8	.500	18	–	13	.581
Boise State	8	–	8	.500	17	–	14	.548
Louisiana Tech	7	–	9	.438	10	–	20	.333
San Jose State	4	–	12	.250	5	–	25	.167
Idaho	1	–	15	.063	4	–	27	.129
† 2007 WAC tournament winner Rankings from AP poll

The 2006–07 Nevada Wolf Pack men's basketball team represented the University of Nevada, Reno during the 2006–07 NCAA Division I men's basketball season. The Wolf Pack, led by head coach Mark Fox, played their home games at the Lawlor Events Center on their campus in Reno, Nevada as members of the Western Athletic Conference (WAC).

After finishing atop the conference regular season standings, Nevada lost in the championship game of the WAC tournament, and received an at-large bid to the NCAA tournament as No. 7 seed in the South Region. The Wolf Pack defeated No. 10 seed Creighton in the opening round before losing to No. 2 seed Memphis in the second round. The team finished with a record of 29–5 (14–2 WAC).

== Roster ==
2006–07 Nevada Wolf Pack men's basketball team
Players
Coaches

Pos.	#	Name	Height	Weight	Year	Previous school	Hometown
G	11	Ramon Sessions	6 ft 3 in (1.91 m)	190 lb (86 kg)	Jr	Myrtle Beach	Myrtle Beach, SC
F	22	Nick Fazekas	6 ft 11 in (2.11 m)	235 lb (107 kg)	Sr	Ralston Valley	Arvada, CO
F	34	JaVale McGee	7 ft 0 in (2.13 m)	237 lb (108 kg)	Fr	Hales Franciscan	Flint, MI

Head coach

- Trent Johnson (Boise State)

Assistant coach(es)

Legend

- (C) Team captain
- (S) Suspended
- (I) Ineligible
- (W) Walk-on
- Injured
- Current redshirt

Roster

== Schedule and results ==
Date time, TV	Rank^{#}	Opponent^{#}	Result	Record	Site city, state
Regular season
Nov 10, 2006*	No. 24	Alaska Anchorage	W 85–62	1–0	Lawlor Events Center; Reno, Nevada
Nov 15, 2006*	No. 24	at Oregon State	W 75–47	2–0	Gill Coliseum; Corvallis, Oregon
Nov 18, 2006*	No. 24	Arkansas-Pine Bluff	W 82–63	3–0	Lawlor Events Center; Reno, Nevada
Nov 21, 2006*	No. 21	UC Irvine	W 83–64	4–0	Lawlor Events Center; Reno, Nevada
Nov 25, 2006*	No. 21	at Santa Clara	W 78–70	5–0	Leavey Center; Santa Clara, California
Nov 29, 2006*	No. 24	at Louisiana-Lafayette	W 86–74	6–0	Cajundome; Lafayette, Louisiana
Dec 3, 2006*	No. 24	vs. California	W 77–71	7–0	SAP Center; Anaheim, California
Dec 9, 2006*	No. 20	UNLV	L 49–58	7–1	Lawlor Events Center; Reno, Nevada
Dec 12, 2006*	No. 25	Saint Mary's	W 76–58	8–1	Lawlor Events Center; Reno, Nevada
Dec 16, 2006*	No. 25	Pacific	W 60–53	9–1	Lawlor Events Center; Reno, Nevada
Dec 22, 2006*	No. 25	at Akron	W 73–71	10–1	James A. Rhodes Arena; Akron, Ohio
Dec 28, 2006*	No. 24	Maine	W 89–69	11–1	Lawlor Events Center; Reno, Nevada
Dec 30, 2006*	No. 24	vs. Gonzaga; Battle in Seattle	W 82–74	12–1	KeyArena; Seattle, Washington
Feb 14, 2007	No. 11	San Jose State	W 68–60	23–2	Lawlor Events Center; Reno, Nevada
Feb 17, 2007*	No. 11	Northern Iowa	W 79–64	24–2	Lawlor Events Center; Reno, Nevada
Feb 22, 2007	No. 11	at Idaho	W 84–68	25–2	Cowan Spectrum; Moscow, Idaho
Feb 24, 2007	No. 11	at Boise State	W 95–81	26–2	Taco Bell Arena; Boise, Idaho
Mar 1, 2007	No. 10	at Utah State	L 77–79 ^{OT}	26–3	Dee Glen Smith Spectrum; Logan, Utah
Mar 3, 2007	No. 10	New Mexico State	W 69–65	27–3	Lawlor Events Center; Reno, Nevada
WAC tournament
Mar 8, 2007*	No. 10	vs. Idaho; Quarterfinals	W 88–56	28–3	Pan American Center; Las Cruces, New Mexico
Mar 9, 2007*	No. 10	vs. Utah State; Semifinals	L 77–79	28–4	Pan American Center; Las Cruces, New Mexico
NCAA tournament
Mar 16, 2007*	(7 S) No. 15	vs. (10 S) Creighton; First Round	W 77–71 ^{OT}	29–4	New Orleans Arena; New Orleans, Louisiana
Mar 18, 2007*	(7 S) No. 15	vs. (2 S) No. 5 Memphis; Second Round	L 62–78	29–5	New Orleans Arena; New Orleans, Louisiana
*Non-conference game. (#) Tournament seedings in parentheses. S=South. All times are in Pacific Time.

== Awards and honors ==
- Nick Fazekas – WAC Player of the Year
- Mark Fox – WAC Coach of the Year
