= 2006–07 Idaho Vandals men's basketball team =

American college basketball season

2006–07 Idaho Vandals men's basketball
- Conference: Western Athletic Conference
- Record: 4–27 (1–15 WAC)
- Head coach: George Pfeifer (1st season)
- Assistant coach: Leroy Washington
- Home arena: Cowan Spectrum

2006–07 WAC men's basketball standings
| | Conf. | | | | Overall |
| Team | W | | L | PCT | W | | L | PCT |
|---|---|---|---|---|---|---|---|---|
| No. 15 Nevada | 14 | – | 2 | .875 | 29 | – | 5 | .853 |
| New Mexico State † | 11 | – | 5 | .688 | 25 | – | 9 | .735 |
| Fresno State | 10 | – | 6 | .625 | 22 | – | 10 | .688 |
| Utah State | 9 | – | 7 | .563 | 23 | – | 12 | .657 |
| Hawaii | 8 | – | 8 | .500 | 18 | – | 13 | .581 |
| Boise State | 8 | – | 8 | .500 | 17 | – | 14 | .548 |
| Louisiana Tech | 7 | – | 9 | .438 | 10 | – | 20 | .333 |
| San Jose State | 4 | – | 12 | .250 | 5 | – | 25 | .167 |
| Idaho | 1 | – | 15 | .063 | 4 | – | 27 | .129 |
† 2007 WAC tournament winner Rankings from AP poll

The 2006–07 Idaho Vandals men's basketball team represented the University of Idaho during the 2006–07 NCAA Division I men's basketball season. Members of the Western Athletic Conference (WAC), the Vandals were led by first-year head coach George Pfeifer and played their home games on campus at Cowan Spectrum in Moscow, Idaho.

The Vandals were 3–26 overall in the regular season and 1–15 in conference play, ninth in the standings.

Riding a twelve-game losing streak after a loss to San Jose State, Idaho drew the eighth seed Spartans again two days later in the play-in round of the conference tournament in Las Cruces, New Mexico, and won by a point. Two days later in the quarterfinal, top-seeded #10 Nevada defeated the Vandals by 32 points.

== Postseason result ==
| Date time, TV | Opponent | Result | Record | Site (attendance) city, state |
WAC Tournament
| Tue, March 6; 6:30 pm | vs. (8) San Jose State; First round | W 50–49 | 4–26 | Pan American Center; Las Cruces, New Mexico |
| Thu, March 8; 11:00 am | vs. No. 10 (1) Nevada; Quarterfinal | L 56–88 | 4–27 | Pan American Center; Las Cruces, New Mexico |
*Non-conference game. ^{#}Rankings from AP poll. (#) Tournament seedings in parentheses. All times are in Pacific time.
