= Reggie Theus =

American basketball player and coach (born 1957)

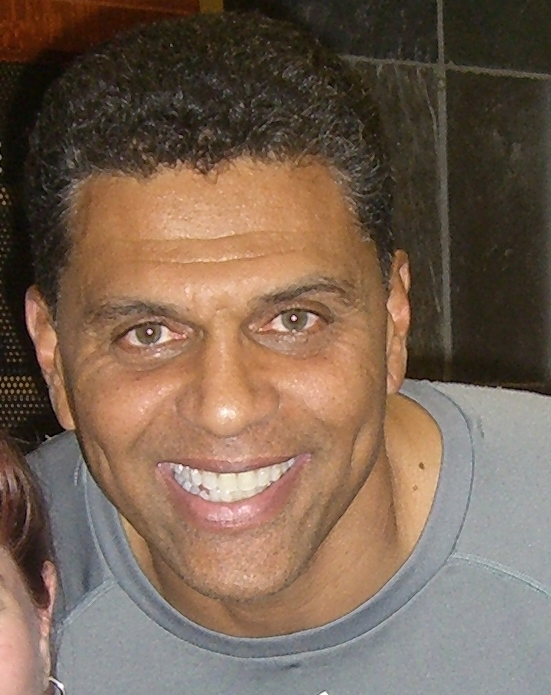
- Theus in 2008

Bethune-Cookman Wildcats
- Title: Head coach / Athletic director
- League: Southwestern Athletic Conference

Personal information
- Born: October 13, 1957 (age 69) Inglewood, California, U.S.
- Listed height: 6 ft 6 in (1.98 m)
- Listed weight: 190 lb (86 kg)

Career information
- High school: Inglewood (Inglewood, California)
- College: UNLV (1975–1978)
- NBA draft: 1978: 1st round, 9th overall pick
- Drafted by: Chicago Bulls
- Playing career: 1978–1993
- Position: Shooting guard / point guard
- Number: 24

Career history

Playing
- 1978–1984: Chicago Bulls
- 1984–1988: Kansas City / Sacramento Kings
- 1988–1989: Atlanta Hawks
- 1989–1990: Orlando Magic
- 1990–1991: New Jersey Nets
- 1991–1992: Ranger Varese
- 1993: Aris

Coaching
- 2002: Las Vegas Slam
- 2003–2005: Louisville (assistant)
- 2005–2007: New Mexico State
- 2007–2008: Sacramento Kings
- 2009–2011: Minnesota Timberwolves (assistant)
- 2012–2013: Los Angeles D-Fenders
- 2013–2018: Cal State Northridge
- 2021–present: Bethune–Cookman

Career highlights
- As player: 2× NBA All-Star (1981, 1983); NBA All-Rookie First Team (1979); No. 23 retired by UNLV Runnin' Rebels; As coach: WAC tournament champion (2007); SWAC regular season champion (2026); SWAC Coach of the Year (2026)

Career NBA statistics
- Points: 19,015 (18.5 ppg)
- Rebounds: 3,349 (3.3 rpg)
- Assists: 6,453 (6.3 apg)
- Stats at NBA.com
- Stats at Basketball Reference

Reginald Wayne Theus (THEE-us; born October 13, 1957) is an American basketball coach and former player. He played 13 seasons in the National Basketball Association (NBA), where he was a two-time NBA All-Star. He is currently the men's basketball head coach and athletic director at Bethune–Cookman. He was the head coach for the NBA's Sacramento Kings and in college with the New Mexico State Aggies and the Cal State Northridge Matadors men's teams. He was also an assistant coach for the Louisville Cardinals under Rick Pitino.

== Early life ==
Theus was one of four children of Felix and Willie Mae Theus. His parents divorced when he was four. His father had a janitorial business and died before Reggie's senior year in high school. For a brief period, Reggie ran his father's business after his death. Theus attended Inglewood High School in Inglewood, California. Growing up, he also attended Monroe Middle School in Inglewood. As a senior at Inglewood, Theus averaged 28.6 points and 15.5 rebounds per game.

== College career ==
Theus played college basketball at UNLV for head coach Jerry Tarkanian from 1975 to 1978. In three seasons with the Runnin' Rebels, Theus averaged 12.9 points, 4.4 assists and 4.3 rebounds per game. Theus, who became one of the best players to ever don a UNLV uniform, shot 81 percent from the free-throw line for his career while amassing 1,177 points (21st on UNLV's all-time scoring list), 401 assists and 389 rebounds in just 91 collegiate games.

As a sophomore, Theus helped lead UNLV into the national spotlight as the Rebels went 29–3, advancing to the school's first Final Four in Atlanta. Despite losing by a single point to North Carolina in the semifinals, UNLV defeated UNC Charlotte in the third-place game and set NCAA single-season records for most points in a season (3,426), most 100-point games (23) and most consecutive 100-point games (12). Theus averaged 14.5 points, 4.5 rebounds and 4.3 assists per game while shooting 81.8 percent from the free-throw line and 49.7 percent from the field as a sophomore.

As a junior, Theus was named a second team All-American after averaging 18.9 points, 6.8 rebounds and 4.5 assists per game.

In 1989, Theus was inducted into the UNLV Athletic Hall of Fame and in 1997, he became one of only eight players in school history to have his number retired by the Rebels.

== Professional career ==
=== Chicago Bulls ===
After attending UNLV and having a successful college career, Theus was selected by the Chicago Bulls with the 9th pick of the 1978 NBA draft.

A 6'7" guard, Theus averaged 16.3 points per game during his first season and was the runner-up for the 1979 NBA Rookie of the Year Award. He was second on the team in scoring behind Artis Gilmore, a future Naismith Memorial Basketball Hall of Fame inductee. Paired in the backcourt with fellow UNLV alumnus Ricky Sobers, Theus followed his rookie campaign with a sophomore season in which he averaged 20.2 points and 6.3 assists for the 1979–1980 Bulls.

He garnered the nickname "Rush Street Reggie" while playing in Chicago for owning an apartment on that street and having an active social life around that area, being frequently spotted at the city night spots.

In 1981, Theus appeared in his first All-Star Game as the Bulls were 45–37 and made the 1981 NBA Playoffs. The Bulls won their first round series, defeating the New York Knicks 2 games to 0, with Theus scoring 37 points with 11 assists in the 115–114 Bulls win in the final game. The Bulls faced the Boston Celtics in the next round and were swept 4–0 as the Celtics went on to win the NBA Championship. Theus was the leading scorer in game 3 with 26 points, and he averaged 19.8 points and 6.3 assists over the six playoff games.

In 1982–1983, Theus averaged a career high 23.8 points per game as the Bulls leading scorer, but the Bulls finished 28–54.

Newly hired Bulls coach Kevin Loughery decided to bench Theus for the first half of the 1983–1984 season. On February 14, 1984, Theus was traded to the Kansas City Kings for Steve Johnson and three second-round draft picks, a move that saddened many Chicago fans who enjoyed Theus' enthusiasm and energy; however, this indirectly freed up a spot for a shooting guard on the Bulls, part of a series of events that eventually led to their drafting of Michael Jordan that off-season. The Bulls finished 27–55. Theus played for five coaches in five and a half seasons in Chicago: Jerry Sloan (1979–1982), Phil Johnson (1982), Rod Thorn (1982), Paul Westhead (1982–1983), and Kevin Loughery (1983–1984).

Theus averaged 18.8 points and 5.6 assists in 441 games in Chicago.

=== Kansas City/Sacramento Kings ===
Theus continued his impressive play with the Kansas City Kings and Kansas City won 12 of their first 17 games after Theus joined the team. He averaged 16.4 points and 8.0 assists in 30 games with the Kings, as the Kings qualified for the playoffs under Coach Phil Johnson, who had coached Theus in Chicago in 1982.

In the 1984–85 season, the Kings moved to Sacramento, California. In the 1985–86 season, Theus averaged 18.3 points and a career high 9.6 assists as the Kings made the playoffs again, losing to the Hakeem Olajuwon and Ralph Sampson and the Houston Rockets 3–0 in the first round, as Theus averaged 15.0 points and 6.3 assists in the series.

Over his four seasons with the Kings, Theus became a key scorer and distributor, averaging 18.8 points and 8.1 assists in 346 games with the Kings.

=== Later career ===
On June 27, 1988, Theus was traded by the Kings to the Atlanta Hawks with a third-round pick for Randy Wittman and a first-round pick. He averaged 15.8 points and 4.7 assists for the Hawks in 1988–89, playing in the backcourt with Doc Rivers and alongside Hall of Famers Dominique Wilkins and Moses Malone. Theus helped the Hawks go 52–30 and advance to the playoffs.

On June 15, 1989, the expansion Orlando Magic, picked him from the Hawks in the expansion draft. The expansion Magic struggled, finishing 18–64. Theus averaged 18.9 points and 5.4 assists with the Magic.

The New Jersey Nets traded a second-round pick to acquire Theus on June 25, 1990. In 1990–1991 he averaged a team-leading 18.6 points along with 4.7 assists for the 26–56 Nets. Theus' NBA career ended after his Nets season.

Theus had career totals of 19,015 points and 6,453 assists, averaging 18.5 and 6.3 in 1026 NBA games.

He played one season in Italy for Ranger Varese before retiring from basketball altogether in 1992. He also played along with Aris in the Greek Cup Final in 1993. In that game he scored 9 points.

Theus is one of only two players in league history listed at 6 ft 6 or taller to tally more than 750 assists in an NBA season (788 in 1985–86), the other player is NBA legend Magic Johnson.

In 1994 he joined Magic Johnson's All-Stars, a touring team that played against overseas and CBA teams.

== Coaching career ==
=== College ===
In 2005, Theus was hired by the New Mexico State Aggies as the head coach of the men's basketball team after the retirement of head coach Lou Henson. In his first season, Theus turned the Aggies from a 6–24 squad in 2004–05 to a 16–14 team in the 2005–06 season – matching the fifth best turn-around for a Division-I men's basketball team. In his second year as head coach, Theus led NMSU to their 17th NCAA tournament, their first tournament appearance since 1999, and coached NMSU to its 14th conference tournament title which earned them an automatic bid into the NCAA tournament.

Theus was named the head coach of California State University Northridge in 2013. In his first season with the Matadors he led them to a 17–18 record, but managed to reach the Big West Conference Finals, where they lost to Cal Poly San Luis Obispo. On March 6, 2018, Cal State Northridge parted ways with Theus after a 44–107 record.

On July 7, 2021, Theus was named head men's basketball coach and athletic director at Bethune–Cookman.

=== NBA ===
On June 19, 2007, Theus was hired by the Maloof brothers and guaranteed three years as head coach of the Sacramento Kings. He noted his hiring as coach had brought his career to "full circle", as he once played in the NBA with the Kings. Marvin Menzies succeeded him as head coach at New Mexico State. On December 15, 2008, Theus was fired by the Kings and the team announced that their assistant coach Kenny Natt would lead the team in the interim period. Theus was an assistant coach with the Minnesota Timberwolves under head coach Kurt Rambis from 2009 to 2011.

Theus became the head coach of the Los Angeles D-Fenders of the NBA D-League in October 2012.

== Honors ==
- 2 × NBA All-Star (1981, 1983)
- NBA All-Rookie First Team (1979)
- In 1989 Theus was inducted into the UNLV Athletics Hall of Fame.
- No. 23 retired by UNLV in 1997.
- In 2014, his Number 23 jersey was retired by Inglewood

== Acting and broadcasting career ==
Theus hosted various talk shows in Sacramento, Orlando and Atlanta.

For several years Theus served as a studio analyst for Turner Sports and the Los Angeles Lakers.

Theus was one of the original panelists on The Best Damn Sports Show Period.

Theus portrayed a high school basketball coach named Bill Fuller in the TNBC Saturday morning sitcom Hang Time from 1995 to 1997.

Theus did in-game color commentary and was the pre-game co-host for "SlamBall" for the 2002 season.

Theus provided the commentary for the video game NBA Live 2000

Theus made cameos in the films Book of Love, Forget Paris and Like Mike.

Theus called Pac-12 basketball with Barry Tompkins on Fox Sports Net.

== Personal life ==
Theus is married to former TV model Elaine Hobson.

Theus has a son, baseball player Brennen Davis, with Jakki Davis-Dollak, a long-jumper at the University of Washington. Davis says that Theus is "not a part of [his] life."

== NBA career statistics ==
Legend
GP	Games played	GS	Games started	MPG	Minutes per game
FG%	Field goal percentage	3P%	3-point field goal percentage	FT%	Free throw percentage
RPG	Rebounds per game	APG	Assists per game	SPG	Steals per game
BPG	Blocks per game	PPG	Points per game	**Bold**	Career high

=== Regular season ===
Year	Team	GP	GS	MPG	FG%	3P%	FT%	RPG	APG	SPG	BPG	PPG
1978–79	Chicago	**82**	–	33.6	.480	–	.761	2.8	5.2	1.1	0.2	16.3
1979–80	Chicago	**82**	–	**36.9**	.483	.267	.838	**4.0**	6.3	1.4	0.2	20.2
1980–81	Chicago	**82**	–	34.4	**.495**	.200	.809	3.5	5.2	1.5	0.2	18.9
1981–82	Chicago	**82**	**82**	34.6	.469	.250	.808	3.8	5.8	1.1	0.2	18.4
1982–83	Chicago	**82**	81	34.8	.478	.231	.801	3.7	5.9	**1.7**	0.2	**23.8**
1983–84	Chicago	31	5	19.4	.388	.200	.778	1.5	4.6	0.7	0.1	8.7
1983–84	Kansas City	30	30	29.9	.438	.148	.751	2.8	7.0	1.0	0.3	15.8
1984–85	Kansas City	**82**	80	31.0	.487	.132	.863	3.3	8.0	1.2	0.2	16.4
1985–86	Sacramento	**82**	**82**	35.6	.480	.171	.827	3.7	**9.6**	1.4	0.2	18.3
1986–87	Sacramento	79	76	36.4	.472	.218	**.867**	3.4	8.8	1.0	0.2	20.3
1987–88	Sacramento	73	73	36.3	.470	.271	.831	3.2	6.3	0.8	0.2	21.6
1988–89	Atlanta	**82**	**82**	30.7	.466	.293	.851	3.0	4.7	1.3	0.2	15.8
1989–90	Orlando	76	71	30.9	.439	.248	.853	2.9	5.4	0.8	0.2	18.9
1990–91	New Jersey	81	81	36.5	.468	**.361**	.851	2.8	4.7	1.0	**0.4**	18.6
Career		1,026	743	33.7	.471	.252	.826	3.3	6.3	1.2	0.2	18.5
All-Star		2	1	13.5	.333	–	–	1.0	2.0	1.0	0.0	4.0

=== Playoffs ===
Year	Team	GP	GS	MPG	FG%	3P%	FT%	RPG	APG	SPG	BPG	PPG
1981	Chicago	**6**	–	**38.7**	**.444**	**.222**	.860	3.5	**6.3**	1.5	0.0	**19.8**
1984	Kansas City	3	–	27.0	.395	.000	**.900**	**3.7**	5.3	**1.7**	0.0	14.3
1986	Sacramento	3	3	34.0	.391	.000	.750	2.7	**6.3**	1.0	**0.7**	15.0
1989	Atlanta	5	**5**	25.4	.368	.000	.750	1.4	4.8	0.2	0.0	7.4
Career		17	8	31.9	.410	.133	.831	2.8	5.7	1.1	0.1	14.4

== Head coaching record ==
=== College ===
Record table
Season	Team	Overall	Conference	Standing	Postseason
New Mexico State Aggies (Western Athletic Conference) (2005–2007)
2005–06	New Mexico State	16–14	10–6	T–4th	
2006–07	New Mexico State	25–9	11–5	2nd	NCAA Division I First round
New Mexico State:		41–23 (.641)	21–11 (.656)		
Cal State Northridge Matadors (Big West Conference) (2013–2018)
2013–14	Cal State Northridge	17–18	7–9	5th	
2014–15	Cal State Northridge	9–24	4–12	8th	
2015–16	Cal State Northridge	10–20	5–11	T–6th	
2016–17	Cal State Northridge	11–19	7–9	6th	
2017–18	Cal State Northridge	6–24	3–13	9th	
Cal State Northridge:		53–105 (.335)	26–54 (.325)		
Bethune–Cookman Wildcats (Southwestern Athletic Conference) (2021–present)
2021–22	Bethune–Cookman	9–21	7–11	10th	
2022–23	Bethune–Cookman	12–20	8–10	7th	
2023–24	Bethune–Cookman	17–17	11–7	5th	CBI First Round
2024–25	Bethune–Cookman	17–16	13–5	3rd	
2025–26	Bethune–Cookman	17–15	14–4	1st	
2026–27	Bethune–Cookman	0–0	0–0		
Bethune-Cookman:		72–89 (.447)	53–37 (.589)		
Total:		166–217 (.433)			
National champion Postseason invitational champion Conference regular season champion Conference regular season and conference tournament champion Division regular season champion Division regular season and conference tournament champion Conference tournament champion

=== NBA ===
Legend
Regular season	G	Games coached	W	Games won	L	Games lost	W–L %	Win–loss %
Playoffs	PG	Playoff games	PW	Playoff wins	PL	Playoff losses	PW–L %	Playoff win–loss %

Team	Year	G	W	L	W–L%	Finish	PG	PW	PL	PW–L%	Result
Sacramento	2007–08	82	38	44	.463	4th in Pacific	—	—	—	—	Missed Playoffs
Sacramento	2008–09	24	6	18	.250	(fired)	—	—	—	—	—
Career		106	44	62	.415		—	—	—	—	

=== D-League ===
Team	Year	G	W	L	W–L%	Finish	PG	PW	PL	PW–L%	Result
Los Angeles	2012–13	50	21	29	.420	3rd in West	—	—	—	—	Missed Playoffs
Career		50	21	29	.420		—	—	—	—	

== See also ==
- List of NBA career assists leaders
- List of NBA career turnovers leaders
