= 1981–82 Long Beach State 49ers men's basketball team =

American college basketball season

1981–82 Long Beach State 49ers men's basketball
- Conference: Pacific Coast Athletic Association
- Record: 12–16 (7–7 PCAA)
- Head coach: Tex Winter (4th season)
- Assistant coach: Bob Gottlieb (1st season)
- Home arena: Long Beach Arena

1981–82 Pacific Coast Athletic Association men's basketball standings
	Conf.				Overall
Team	W		L	PCT	W		L	PCT
No. 11 Fresno State†	13	–	1	.929	27	–	3	.900
UC Irvine	10	–	4	.714	23	–	7	.767
Cal State Fullerton	9	–	5	.643	18	–	14	.563
San Jose State	7	–	7	.500	13	–	13	.500
Long Beach State	7	–	7	.500	12	–	16	.429
UC Santa Barbara	5	–	9	.357	10	–	16	.385
Pacific	3	–	11	.214	7	–	20	.259
Utah State	2	–	12	.143	4	–	23	.148
† 1982 PCAA tournament winner

The 1981–82 Long Beach State 49ers men's basketball team represented the Long Beach State University in the 1981–82 NCAA Division I men's basketball season. the 49ers Led by fourth year head coach Tex Winter and they finished season with a record of 12-16, 7-7.

== Roster ==
1981–82 Long Beach State 49ers men's basketball team
Players	Coaches
Pos. / # / Name / Height / Weight / Year / Hometown; F / 20 / Craig Hodges / 6 ft 3 in (1.91 m) / 190 lb (86 kg) / Sr / Park Forest, Illinois	Head coach: Tex Winter; Assistant coach(es): Bob Gottlieb; Legend: (C) Team captain; (S) Suspended; (I) Ineligible; (W) Walk-on; Injured; Current redshirt

== Schedule and results ==
Date time, TV	Rank^{#}	Opponent^{#}	Result	Record	Site (attendance) city, state
Non-conference regular season
Nov 30, 1981*		Weber State	W 75–67	1–0	Long Beach Arena; Long Beach, California
Dec 4, 1981*		vs. Vanderbilt	L 70–72	1–1	
Dec 5, 1981*		vs. New Mexico State	W 85–70	2–1	
Dec 8, 1981*		No. 4 Wichita State	L 71–94	2–2	Long Beach Arena; Long Beach, California
Dec 12, 1981*		USC	L 66–74	2–3	Long Beach Arena; Long Beach, California
Dec 21, 1981*		Texas Tech	L 71–83	2–4	Long Beach Arena; Long Beach, California
Dec 22, 1981*		at San Diego State	L 84–92	2–5	San Diego Sports Arena; San Diego, California
Dec 28, 1981*		at Idaho State	L 72–79	2–6	Holt Arena; Pocatello, Idaho
Dec 30, 1981*		at Boise State	W 85–73	3–6	Bronco Gymnasium; Boise, Idaho
Jan 2, 1982*		at No. 9 Minnesota	L 67–75	3–7	Williams Arena; Minneapolis, Minnesota
Jan 9, 1982*		Pepperdine	W 80–78	4–7	Long Beach Arena; Long Beach, California
PCAA regular season
Jan 14, 1982		UC Santa Barbara	L 59–71	4–8 (0–1)	Long Beach Arena; Long Beach, California
Jan 16, 1982		Cal State Fullerton	W 59–56	5–8 (1–1)	Long Beach Arena; Long Beach, California
Jan 21, 1982		at Utah State	L 82–90	5–9 (1–2)	Dee Glen Smith Spectrum; Logan, Utah
Jan 23, 1982		at Pacific	L 58–60	5–10 (1–3)	Alex G. Spanos Center; Stockton, California
Jan 28, 1982		UC Irvine	L 68–78	5–11 (1–4)	Long Beach Arena (5,396); Long Beach, California
Jan 30, 1982		at UC Irvine	L 59–71	5–12 (1–5)	Crawford Hall (5,479); Irvine, California
Jan 31, 1982*		at UNLV	L 61–97	5–13 (1–5)	Las Vegas Convention Center; Winchester, Nevada
Feb 4, 1982		No. 17 Fresno State	W 45–42 ^{OT}	6–13 (2–5)	Long Beach Arena; Long Beach, California
Feb 6, 1982		San Jose State	W 47–45	7–13 (3–5)	Long Beach Arena; Long Beach, California
Feb 11, 1982		at No. 18 Fresno State	L 45–54	7–14 (3–6)	Selland Arena; Fresno, California
Feb 13, 1982		at San Jose State	W 57–56	8–14 (4–6)	San Jose Civic Auditorium; San Jose, California
Feb 19, 1982		Utah State	W 73–54	9–14 (5–6)	Long Beach Arena; Long Beach, California
Feb 20, 1982		Pacific	W 83–69	10–14 (6–6)	Long Beach Arena; Long Beach, California
Feb 25, 1982		at UC Santa Barbara	W 79–76	11–14 (7–6)	The Thunderdome; Santa Barbara, California
Feb 27, 1982		Cal State Fullerton	L 76–77	11–15 (7–7)	Long Beach Arena; Long Beach, California
PCAA Tournament
Mar 4, 1982	(5)	vs. (4) San Jose State; First round	W 71–68	12–15 (7–7)	Anaheim Convention Center; Anaheim, California
Mar 5, 1982	(5)	vs. (1) No. 12 Fresno State; Semifinals	L 55–76	12–16 (7–7)	Anaheim Convention Center; Anaheim, California
*Non-conference game. ^{#}Rankings from AP Poll. (#) Tournament seedings in parentheses. All times are in Pacific Time.

== Team players drafted into the NBA ==
Round	Pick	Player	NBA club
3	48	Craig Hodges	San Diego Clippers
4	81	Dino Gregory	Washington Bullets
