= 1982 Pacific Coast Athletic Association men's basketball tournament =

- Classification: Division I
- Season: 1981–82
- Teams: 7
- Site: Anaheim Convention Center; Anaheim, CA
- Champions: Fresno State (2nd title)
- Winning coach: Boyd Grant (2nd title)
- MVP: Donald Mason (Fresno State)
- Pacific Coast Athletic Association men's basketball tournaments

1981–82 Pacific Coast Athletic Association men's basketball standings
	Conf.				Overall
Team	W		L	PCT	W		L	PCT
No. 11 Fresno State†	13	–	1	.929	27	–	3	.900
UC Irvine	10	–	4	.714	23	–	7	.767
Cal State Fullerton	9	–	5	.643	18	–	14	.563
San Jose State	7	–	7	.500	13	–	13	.500
Long Beach State	7	–	7	.500	12	–	16	.429
UC Santa Barbara	5	–	9	.357	10	–	16	.385
Pacific	3	–	11	.214	7	–	20	.259
Utah State	2	–	12	.143	4	–	23	.148
† 1982 PCAA tournament winner

The 1982 Pacific Coast Athletic Association men's basketball tournament (now known as the Big West Conference men's basketball tournament) was held March 4–6 at the Anaheim Convention Center in Anaheim, California.

Top-seeded defending champions Fresno State defeated Cal State Fullerton in the title game, 69–57, to win the Bulldogs' second PCAA/Big West men's basketball tournament.

Fresno State, in turn, received a bid to the 1982 NCAA tournament, the program's second-ever appearance.

== Format ==
The format remained the same as the 1981 tournament, with seven teams in the field. PCAA member UC Santa Barbara did not participate.

With seven teams participating, the top-seeded team was given a bye into the semifinals while the remaining six teams were entered into the first round and seeded based on regular season conference records.

== Bracket ==
First round Thursday, March 4
5	Long Beach State	71
4	San José State	68
3	Cal State Fullerton	64
6	Pacific	52
7	Utah State	64
2	UC Irvine	90

Semifinals; Friday, March 5
1	#12 Fresno State	76
5	Long Beach State	55
3	Cal State Fullerton	62
2	UC Irvine	61

Championship; Saturday, March 6
1	#12 Fresno State	69
3	Cal State Fullerton	57
