= 2006–07 New Mexico State Aggies men's basketball team =

American college basketball season

2006–07 New Mexico State Aggies men's basketball

WAC Tournament champions

NCAA Tournament, Round of 64
- Conference: Western Athletic Conference
- Record: 25–9 (11–5 WAC)
- Head coach: Reggie Theus
- Home arena: Pan American Center

2006–07 WAC men's basketball standings
	Conf.				Overall
Team	W		L	PCT	W		L	PCT
No. 15 Nevada	14	–	2	.875	29	–	5	.853
New Mexico State †	11	–	5	.688	25	–	9	.735
Fresno State	10	–	6	.625	22	–	10	.688
Utah State	9	–	7	.563	23	–	12	.657
Hawaii	8	–	8	.500	18	–	13	.581
Boise State	8	–	8	.500	17	–	14	.548
Louisiana Tech	7	–	9	.438	10	–	20	.333
San Jose State	4	–	12	.250	5	–	25	.167
Idaho	1	–	15	.063	4	–	27	.129
† 2007 WAC tournament winner Rankings from AP poll

The 2006–07 New Mexico State Aggies men's basketball team represented New Mexico State University in the 2006–07 college basketball season. This was the second season for head coach Reggie Theus. The Aggies played their home games at Pan American Center and competed in the Western Athletic Conference. They finished the season 25–9, 11–5 in WAC play. They won the 2007 WAC men's basketball tournament to earn the conference's automatic bid to the 2007 NCAA Division I men's basketball tournament. They earned a 13 seed in the East Region where they were defeated by 4 seed Texas, and superstar freshman Kevin Durant, in the opening round.

== Roster ==
2006–07 New Mexico State Aggies men's basketball team
Players
Coaches

Pos.	#	Name	Height	Weight	Year	Hometown
G	1	Justin Hawkins	6 ft 5 in (1.96 m)	204 lb (93 kg)	Jr	Anaheim, California
G	22	Jonathan Gibson	6 ft 2 in (1.88 m)	180 lb (82 kg)	Fr	West Covina, California

Head coach

- Reggie Theus

Assistant coach(es)

Legend

- (C) Team captain
- (S) Suspended
- (I) Ineligible
- (W) Walk-on
- Injured
- Current redshirt

== Schedule and results ==
Date time, TV	Rank^{#}	Opponent^{#}	Result	Record	Site (attendance) city, state
Regular Season
Nov 14, 2006*		Pacific	W 76–74	1–0	Pan American Center (7,989); Las Cruces, New Mexico
Nov 17, 2006*		at Loyola Marymount	L 69–71	1–1	Gersten Pavilion (3,570); Los Angeles, California
Nov 19, 2006*		at No. 15 Arizona	L 87–102	1–2	McKale Center (13,650); Tucson, Arizona
Feb 17, 2007*		Ohio	W 77–72	20–6	Pan American Center (9,100); Las Cruces, New Mexico
Mar 3, 2007		at No. 10 Nevada	L 65–69	22–8 (11–5)	Lawlor Events Center (11,462); Reno, Nevada
WAC Tournament
Mar 8, 2007*		Louisiana Tech; Quarterfinals	W 77–70	23–8	Pan American Center (11,532); Las Cruces, New Mexico
Mar 9, 2007*		Boise State; Semifinals	W 88–69	24–8	Pan American Center (11,553); Las Cruces, New Mexico
Mar 10, 2007*		Utah State; Championship game	W 72–70	25–8	Pan American Center (11,948); Las Cruces, New Mexico
NCAA Tournament
Mar 16, 2007*	(13 E)	vs. (4 E) No. 11 Texas; First Round	L 67–79	25–9	Spokane Arena (11,551); Spokane, Washington
*Non-conference game. ^{#}Rankings from AP Poll. (#) Tournament seedings in parentheses.
