= 2014 NBA Development League draft =

General information
- Sport: Basketball
- Date: November 1, 2014
- Location: via Cisco WebEx Meeting Center at 3:30 PM (EDT)

Overview
- League: NBA
- First selection: Robert Covington, Grand Rapids Drive

The 2014 NBA Development League draft was the 14th draft of the National Basketball Association Development League (NBDL). The draft was held on November 1, 2014, just before the 2014–15 season.

== Key ==
Pos.	G	F	C
Position	Guard	Forward	Center

^	Denotes player who has been selected to (an) NBA Development League All-Star Game(s)
*	Denotes player who has been selected to (an) NBA Development League All-Star Game(s) and was also selected in an NBA draft
†	Denotes player who was also selected in an NBA Draft

== Draft ==
=== First round ===
Pick	Player	Pos.	Nationality	Team	College
1	Robert Covington	F	United States	Grand Rapids Drive	Tennessee State
2	Elliot Williams^{†}	G	United States	Santa Cruz Warriors	Memphis
3	Erik Murphy^{†}	F	Finland	Austin Spurs	Florida
4	Carrick Felix^{†}	G	United States	Santa Cruz Warriors	Arizona State
5	Ben Hansbrough	G	United States	Grand Rapids Drive	Notre Dame
6	Miloš Milisavljević	G	Serbia	Texas Legends	Serbia
7	Tre Bussey	G	United States	Idaho Stampede	Georgia Southern
8	Robert Vaden^{†}	G	United States	Bakersfield Jam	UAB
9	Marquis Teague^{†}	G	United States	Oklahoma City Blue	Kentucky
10	Joonas Cavén	F	Finland	Reno Bighorns	Finland
11	Brady Heslip	G	Canada	Reno Bighorns	Baylor
12	Michael Dunigan	C	United States	Canton Charge	Oregon
13	Melvin Johnson III	G	United States	Santa Cruz Warriors	Arkansas State
14	Chane Behanan	F	United States	Rio Grande Valley Vipers	Louisville
15	Fuquan Edwin	F	United States	Sioux Falls Skyforce	Seton Hall
16	Damien Wilkins	G	United States	Iowa Energy	Georgia
17	Eloy Vargas	F	Dominican Republic	Los Angeles D-Fenders	Kentucky
18	Justin Jackson	F	United States	Rio Grande Valley Vipers	Cincinnati

=== Second round ===
Pick	Player	Pos.	Nationality	Team	College
1	D. J. Seeley	G	United States	Delaware 87ers	Cal State Fullerton
2	Daniel Coursey	F	United States	Erie Bayhawks	Mercer
3	Andre Emmett^{†}	G	United States	Fort Wayne Mad Ants	Texas Tech
4	Asauhn Dixon-Tatum	C	United States	Maine Red Claws	Auburn
5	Omondi Amoke	F	United States	Grand Rapids Drive	Cal State Fullerton
6	Nick Barbour	G	United States	Texas Legends	High Point
7	John Bohannon	C	United States	Erie Bayhawks	UTEP
8	Naadir Tharpe	G	United States	Los Angeles D-Fenders	Kansas
9	Yuki Togashi	G	Japan	Santa Cruz Warriors	Japan
10	Joseph Bertrand	G	United States	Westchester Knicks	Illinois
11	Tristan Spurlock	F	United States	Canton Charge	UCF
12	Jamal Jones	G	United States	Delaware 87ers	Texas A&M
13	TrayVonn Wright	F	United States	Santa Cruz Warriors	North Dakota State
14	Tristan Carey	G	United States	Rio Grande Valley Vipers	Longwood
15	Michael Williams	G	United States	Sioux Falls Skyforce	Cal State Fullerton
16	Manny Atkins	F	United States	Sioux Falls Skyforce	Georgia State
17	Sebastian Koch	G	Germany	Delaware 87ers	Elon
18	Quinton Doggett	F	United States	Idaho Stampede	Southern

=== Third round ===
Pick	Player	Pos.	Nationality	Team	College
1	Shaun Pruitt	F	United States	Grand Rapids Drive	Illinois
2	Lenzelle Smith, Jr.	G	United States	Erie Bayhawks	Ohio State
3	Omari Johnson	F	Jamaica	Maine Red Claws	Oregon State
4	David Stockton	G	United States	Maine Red Claws	Gonzaga
5	Devon Moore	G	United States	Delaware 87ers	JMU
6	George Beamon	G	United States	Oklahoma City Blue	Manhattan
7	Ryan Sypkens	G	United States	Idaho Stampede	UC Davis
8	Keith Wright	F	United States	Austin Spurs	Harvard
9	Dane Miller	G	United States	Oklahoma City Blue	Rutgers
10	Chadrack Lufile	F	Canada	Sioux Falls Skyforce	Wichita State
11	Kammeon Holsey	F	United States	Grand Rapids Drive	Georgia Tech
12	Kodi Augustus	F	United States	Idaho Stampede	Mississippi State
13	Dominic Waters	G	United States	Grand Rapids Drive	Portland State
14	Tyrone White	F	United States	Rio Grande Valley Vipers	Cal State Bakersfield
15	Xavier Munford^{^}	G	United States	Maine Red Claws	Rhode Island
16	Mike McCall Jr.	G	United States	Iowa Energy	Saint Louis
17	Ray Turner	F	United States	Los Angeles D-Fenders	Texas A&M
18	Titus Rubles	F	United States	Fort Wayne Mad Ants	Cincinnati

=== Fourth round ===
Pick	Player	Pos.	Nationality	Team	College
1	Kenny Hall	F	United States	Delaware 87ers	Tennessee
2	Brian Oliver	F	United States	Reno Bighorns	Seton Hall
3	Donte Poole	G	United States	Austin Spurs	Murray State
4	Luke Loucks	G	United States	Maine Red Claws	Florida State
5	Renaldo Woolridge	F	United States	Grand Rapids Drive	USC
6	Anthony Veeren	G	United States	Texas Legends	Texas-Arlington
7	Marcus Hall	G	United States	Fort Wayne Mad Ants	Colorado
8	Michael Haynes	F	United States	Bakersfield Jam	Fordham
9	Jonathan Mitchell	F	United States	Oklahoma City Blue	Rutgers
10	Todd Mayo	G	United States	Westchester Knicks	Marquette
11	Ravern Johnson	G	United States	Reno Bighorns	Mississippi State
12	Kevin Foster	G	United States	Reno Bighorns	Santa Clara
13	Tymell Murphy	F	United States	Canton Charge	FIU
14	Duke Mondy	G	United States	Rio Grande Valley Vipers	Oakland
15	Matt Hezekiah	F	United States	Sioux Falls Skyforce	South Carolina
16	Marcus Melvin	F	United States	Iowa Energy	North Carolina State
17	Charles Hinkle	F	United States	Los Angeles D-Fenders	American
18	Stephen Madison	F	United States	Fort Wayne Mad Ants	Idaho

=== Fifth round ===
Pick	Player	Pos.	Nationality	Team	College
1	LaQuentin Miles	G	United States	Delaware 87ers	Central Arkansas
2	Kevin Anderson	G	United States	Erie Bayhawks	Richmond
3	Corey Raji	F	Nigeria	Austin Spurs	Boston College
4	Joshua Freelove	G	United States	Maine Red Claws	Buffalo
5	Kelsey Barlow	G	United States	Grand Rapids Drive	UIC
6	Luis Jacobo	F	Dominican Republic	Texas Legends	IPFW
7	Nick Covington	G	United States	Idaho Stampede	Oklahoma City
8	DeShone McClure	G	United States	Texas Legends	Central Arkansas
9	Michael Porrini	G	United States	Oklahoma City Blue	Kent State
10	AJ Ussery	C	United States	Westchester Knicks	Point Loma
11	Joel Wright	F	United States	Idaho Stampede	Texas State
12	Kevin Thompson	F	United States	Canton Charge	Morgan State
13	Marcus Bell	C	United States	Santa Cruz Warriors	Cal State Stanislaus
14	Jarvis Threatt	G	United States	Rio Grande Valley Vipers	Delaware
15	Ashton Gibbs	G	United States	Sioux Falls Skyforce	Pittsburgh
16	Anthony Stover	C	United States	Iowa Energy	UCLA
17	Jordan Burris	G	United States	Los Angeles D-Fenders	Cal State San Bernardino
18	Stefan Bonneau	G	United States	Fort Wayne Mad Ants	C.W. Post

=== Sixth Round ===
Pick	Player	Pos.	Nationality	Team	College
1	Brandon Goode	C	United States	Delaware 87ers	Norfolk State
2	Travis Betran	G	United States	Erie Bayhawks	Austin Peay
3	Joe Mitchell	G	United States	Austin Spurs	Friends
4	Moses Sundufu	G	United States	Grand Rapids Drive	St. Mary's
5	Jerrell Sanders	F	United States	Grand Rapids Drive	Ferris State
6	Arron Mollet	G	United States	Texas Legends	Notre Dame de Namur
7	Shane Gibson	G	United States	Idaho Stampede	Sacred Heart
8	Mohamed Tangara	F	Mali	Bakersfield Jam	Chaminade
9	Amadou Mbodji	F	Senegal	Oklahoma City Blue	Jacksonville State
10	Sherrod Wright	G	United States	Westchester Knicks	George Mason
11	Dwayne Mitchell^	G	United States	Westchester Knicks	Louisiana-Lafayette
12	Kevin Olekaibe	G	United States	Canton Charge	UNLV
13	Greg Howard	G	United States	Santa Cruz Warriors	Walsh
14	Austin Witter	F	United States	Rio Grande Valley Vipers	North Carolina A&T
15	Chris McNealy	G	United States	Sioux Falls Skyforce	UC Irvine
16	Malik Smith	G	United States	Iowa Energy	Minnesota
17	Bill Clark	G	United States	Bakersfield Jam	Duquesne
18	Marcus Simmons	G	United States	Fort Wayne Mad Ants	USC

=== Seventh Round ===
Pick	Player	Pos.	Nationality	Team	College
1	Marcus Goode	C	United States	Erie Bayhawks	Marshall
2	Mfon Udofia	G	United States	Austin Spurs	Georgia Tech
3	Tyrrel Tate	F	United States	Idaho Stampede	Fayetteville State
4	Ricardo Barbosa	G	Brazil	Bakersfield Jam	Brazil
5	Kevin Tiggs	G	United States	Westchester Knicks	East Tennessee State
6	Keith Chamberlain	F	United States	Reno Bighorns	Grinnell
7	Deilvez Yearby	F	United States	Canton Charge	IPFW
8	Brandon Provost	G	United States	Iowa Energy	UTPA
9	Sammy Yeager	F	United States	Los Angeles D-Fenders	Cal State Fullerton
10	Kyrie Sutton	F	United States	Fort Wayne Mad Ants	Binghamton

=== Eighth Round ===
Pick	Player	Pos.	Nationality	Team	College
1	Justin Simmons	G	United States	Erie Bayhawks	Nebraska-Omaha
2	Cory Dixon	F	United States	Austin Spurs	New Orleans
3	John Petrucelli	F	United States	Bakersfield Jam	Molloy
4	Raymond Cowels	G	United States	Reno Bighorns	Santa Clara
