= Renaldo Woolridge =

American basketball player (born 1990)

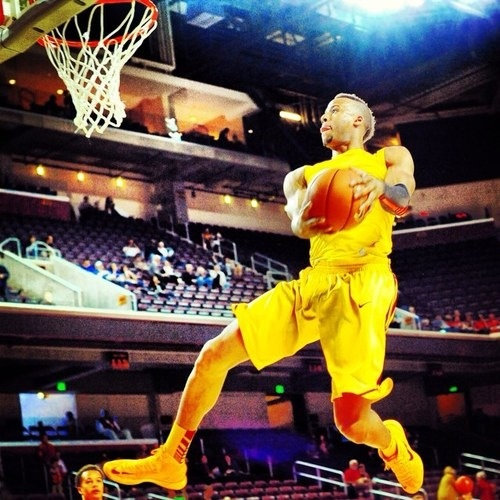

Personal information
- Born: March 22, 1990 (age 36) Los Angeles, California
- Listed height: 6 ft 9 in (2.06 m)
- Listed weight: 225 lb (102 kg)

Career information
- High school: Harvard-Westlake (Los Angeles, California)
- College: Tennessee (2008–2012); USC (2012–2013)
- NBA draft: 2013: undrafted
- Playing career: 2013–2015
- Position: Small forward

Career history
- 2014: Metalac Valjevo
- 2014–2015: Grand Rapids Drive
- Stats at Basketball Reference

Renaldo James Woolridge (born March 22, 1990) is an American former professional basketball player. He is also a musical recording artist who goes by the name "Swiperboy." He played college basketball at Tennessee and USC. He played professionally in the NBA Development League and overseas in Serbia.

== High school career ==
Woolridge is a graduate of Harvard-Westlake School in Los Angeles where he was a two-time league MVP and earned first-team all-state honors following his junior and senior seasons. As a senior in 2007–08, he averaged 23 points and 11 rebounds per game.

== College career ==
In his freshman season at Tennessee, Woolridge saw action in 32 of UT's 34 games while making six starts. He served primarily as a backup small forward in very limited playing time, averaging 8.8 minutes, 2.6 points and 1.3 rebounds per game.

In his sophomore season, Woolridge saw action in 28 games with 10 starts while averaging 3.4 points and 2.9 rebounds in 13.0 minutes per game, mostly playing as a backup power forward. Woolridge scored 14 points and 8 rebounds in the fairytale upset win over the then #1 ranked Kansas Jayhawks which was broadcast on CBS

In his true junior season, Woolridge managed just eight games due to an ankle injury and subsequently redshirted the 2010–11 season.

In his redshirted junior season, Woolridge played in 25 games for Tennessee, making four starts and averaging 4.3 points and 3.3 rebounds while playing 13.6 minutes per game. Had a season-high 17 points against 2012 NCAA Champion Kentucky Wildcats, including 5 three-pointers in a row in Rupp Arena. In May 2012, he graduated from Tennessee with a B.A. in Sociology.

Woolridge entered graduate school at USC in the summer of 2012, where he completed his redshirt senior season.

== Professional basketball career ==
After going undrafted in the 2013 NBA draft, Woolridge joined the Los Angeles Lakers for the 2013 NBA Summer League. On September 6, 2013, he signed with Bilbao Basket of Spain. On January 24, 2014, he signed with Metalac Valjevo of Serbia for the rest of the 2013–14 season.

In July 2014, Woolridge re-joined the Los Angeles Lakers for the 2014 NBA Summer League. On November 1, 2014, he was selected by the Grand Rapids Drive in the fourth round of the 2014 NBA Development League Draft.

On October 31, 2015, Woolridge was reacquired by the Grand Rapids Drive. However, following an injury, he was waived on November 11.

On April 1, 2016, Woolridge was acquired by the Westchester Knicks. On November 10, 2016, he parted ways with the Knicks before appearing in a game for them.

== Personal life ==
Woolridge is the second of three children born to Pat Jackson Woolridge and the late Orlando Woolridge, who played collegiately at Notre Dame, where he earned All-American honors before enjoying a 13-year NBA career, including two seasons with the Lakers. His brother, Zach, played basketball at Princeton (2005–2008) and graduated with a degree in Operations Research and Financial Engineering, while his sister, Tiana, played college volleyball and also graduated from Princeton. She is a student at UCSF School of Medicine.

Woolridge is also a hip hop artist/writer/producer who performs under the moniker of "SB Babyy" and as a freshman, founded his own independent record label called Swiperboy Entertainment.

== Musical career ==
Woolridge is also a musical recording artist who performs under the moniker "Swiperboy" aka "SB". While in college, he founded his own independent record label called Swiperboy Entertainment, "SBYZ" in short. In 2009, he made the anthem for the University of Tennessee football program as a part of Eric Berry's Heisman campaign. The song/video went viral online and was played at every home football game in Neyland Stadium during the 2009 season. In 2010, Woolridge was featured on ABC's Race to March Madness which spotlighted his niche as the first ever college basketball player and recording artist. Throughout his time in college, he wrote, recorded and performed songs for both the University of Tennessee and the University of Southern California. In 2011, he was spotlighted on yahoo receiving national attention for his song "USA Troops" which praised the efforts of the USA soldiers. In 2013, his song "Fight On (We Play to Rise)" was played at USC sporting events, including in the Galen Center and Los Angeles Memorial Coliseum for USC Football games. He then performed that song at USC's Spring Festival that was headlined by Big Sean. In 2014, Woolridge created the anthem for his NBA Development League team the Grand Rapids Drive which played as they entered the court during home games for the 2014–15 season. He has numerous songs and mixtapes available online, as well as multiple projects available for purchase on iTunes. His most recent release is an EP called "Any Volunteers?" which is currently available on iTunes, Spotify, Rhapsody and more.
