= Boyd Grant =

American basketball player and coach (1933–2020)

Biographical details
- Born: August 17, 1933; Idaho, U.S.
- Died: August 17, 2020 (aged 87); Salt Lake City, Utah, U.S.

Playing career
- 1954–1955: Snow College
- 1955–1957: Colorado State

Coaching career (HC unless noted)
- 1959–1961: Mountain View HS
- 1961–1972: Colorado State (assistant)
- 1972–1974: Kentucky (assistant)
- 1974–1977: College of Southern Idaho
- 1977–1986: Fresno State
- 1987–1991: Colorado State

Head coaching record
- Overall: 368–126

Accomplishments and honors

Championships
- NJCAA National Championship (1976); NIT (1983); 3 SWAC regular season (1975–1977); 3 PCAA regular season (1978, 1981, 1982); 3 PCAA tournament (1981, 1982, 1984); 2 WAC regular season (1989, 1990)

Awards
- 3× PCAA Coach of the Year (1978, 1981, 1982)

John Boyd "Tiny" Grant (August 17, 1933 – August 17, 2020) was an American college basketball coach for Fresno State and Colorado State.

Hailing from American Falls, Idaho, Grant played junior college basketball at Snow College in Utah for Jim Williams, then followed Williams when he became head coach at Colorado State (CSU). Following his graduation, Grant became coach of Mountain View High School in Wyoming before rejoining Williams at CSU as an assistant in 1961. Grant spent 12 seasons there before moving to Joe B. Hall's staff at Kentucky for two years. He was hired as head coach of the NJCAA's College of Southern Idaho (CSI) in 1974.

Grant proved highly successful in three seasons at CSI. His teams compiled a record of 93–6, won 49 consecutive games and won the 1976 NJCAA national championship (after playing in the final the previous year). His success landed him his first NCAA Division I job in 1977 as Fresno State hired him to replace Ed Gregory. Grant coached Fresno State for nine seasons, compiling a record of 194–74 and guiding the Bulldogs to three NCAA tournament appearances and the 1983 National Invitation Tournament title. He resigned following the 1985–86 season.

Grant returned to coaching in 1987 as head coach at his alma mater, Colorado State. He coached for four seasons, compiling an 81–46 record and NCAA Tournament appearances in 1989 and 1990. Grant retired from coaching in 1991.

Grant died on August 17, 2020, after suffering a stroke two days before.

== Head coaching record ==
=== NJCAA ===
Record table
Season	Coach	Overall	Conference	Standing	Postseason
College of Southern Idaho (SWAC) (1974–1977)
1974–75	College of Idaho	27–3	–		NJCAA Runner up
1975–76	College of Idaho	34–1	–		NJCAA Championship
1976–77	College of Idaho	32–2	–		NJCAA Participant
College of Southern Idaho:		93–6 (.939)	– (–)		
Total:		93–6 (.939)			
National champion Postseason invitational champion Conference regular season champion Conference regular season and conference tournament champion Division regular season champion Division regular season and conference tournament champion Conference tournament champion

=== NCAA ===
Record table
Season	Coach	Overall	Conference	Standing	Postseason
Fresno State (Pacific Coast Athletic Association) (1977–1986)
1977–78	Fresno State	21–6	11–3	T–1st	
1978–79	Fresno State	16–12	9–5	T–2nd	
1979–80	Fresno State	17–7	8–4	3rd	
1980–81	Fresno State	25–4	12–2	1st	NCAA Division I First Round
1981–82	Fresno State	27–3	13–1	1st	NCAA Division I Sweet Sixteen
1982–83	Fresno State	25–10	9–7	4th	NIT champions
1983–84	Fresno State	25–8	13–5	3rd	NCAA Division I First Round
1984–85	Fresno State	23–9	15–3	2nd	NIT Quarterfinal
1985–86	Fresno State	15–15	8–10	6th	
Fresno State:		194–74 (.724)	98–40 (.710)		
Colorado State (Western Athletic Conference) (1987–1991)
1987–88	Colorado State	22–13	8–8	T–5th	NIT Final Four
1988–89	Colorado State	23–10	12–4	1st	NCAA Division I Second Round
1989–90	Colorado State	21–9	11–5	T–1st	NCAA Division I First Round
1990–91	Colorado State	15–14	6–10	T–7th	
Colorado State:		81–46 (.638)	37–27 (.578)		
Total:		275–120 (.696)			
National champion Postseason invitational champion Conference regular season champion Conference regular season and conference tournament champion Division regular season champion Division regular season and conference tournament champion Conference tournament champion
