= 1981–82 Fresno State Bulldogs men's basketball team =

American college basketball season

1981–82 Fresno State Bulldogs men's basketball

PCAA Regular season champion PCAA tournament champion

NCAA tournament, Sweet Sixteen
- Conference: Pacific Coast Athletic Association Conference
- Record: 27–3 (13–1 PCAA)
- Head coach: Boyd Grant (5th season)
- Home arena: Selland Arena

1981–82 Pacific Coast Athletic Association men's basketball standings
	Conf.				Overall
Team	W		L	PCT	W		L	PCT
No. 11 Fresno State†	13	–	1	.929	27	–	3	.900
UC Irvine	10	–	4	.714	23	–	7	.767
Cal State Fullerton	9	–	5	.643	18	–	14	.563
San Jose State	7	–	7	.500	13	–	13	.500
Long Beach State	7	–	7	.500	12	–	16	.429
UC Santa Barbara	5	–	9	.357	10	–	16	.385
Pacific	3	–	11	.214	7	–	20	.259
Utah State	2	–	12	.143	4	–	23	.148
† 1982 PCAA tournament winner

The 1981–82 Fresno State Bulldogs men's basketball team represented California State University, Fresno during the 1981–82 NCAA Division I men's basketball season. This was head coach Boyd Grant's fifth season at Fresno State. The Bulldogs played their home games at Selland Arena and were members of the Pacific Coast Athletic Association. They finished the season 27–3, 13–1 in PCAA play to win the conference regular season title. They defeated Cal State Fullerton to win the PCAA tournament and earn the conference's automatic bid to the NCAA tournament. The Bulldogs lost in the Sweet Sixteen to eventual runner-up Georgetown, 58–40.

== Roster ==
1981–82 Fresno State Bulldogs men's basketball team
Players
Coaches

Pos.	#	Name	Height	Weight	Year	Previous school	Hometown
F	22	Rod Higgins	6 ft 7 in (2.01 m)	195 lb (88 kg)	RS Sr	Thornton Township	Harvey, Illinois
F	34	Bernard Thompson	6 ft 6 in (1.98 m)	200 lb (91 kg)	RS So	South Mountain HS	Phoenix, Arizona

Head coach

- Boyd Grant (Colorado State)

Assistant coach(es)

Legend

- (C) Team captain
- (S) Suspended
- (I) Ineligible
- (W) Walk-on
- Injured
- Current redshirt

Roster

== Schedule and results ==
Date time, TV	Rank^{#}	Opponent^{#}	Result	Record	Site city, state
Exhibition
Nov ?, 1981*		University of Victoria	W 49–45	0–0	Selland Arena (4,958); Fresno, California
Regular season
Nov 27, 1981*		Oklahoma City; Sun Met Classic	W 68–48	1–0	Selland Arena (6,530); Fresno, California
Nov 28, 1981*		Nevada; Sun Met Classic	W 64–52	2–0	Selland Arena (6,530); Fresno, California
Nov 30, 1981*		Saint Martin's	W 60–31	3–0	Selland Arena (6,460); Fresno, California
Dec 5, 1981*		at Air Force	W 45–37	4–0	Clune Arena; Colorado Springs, Colorado
Dec 11, 1981*		vs. Ole Miss; Bayou Classic	W 46–44	5–0	Blackham Coliseum; Lafayette, Louisiana
Dec 12, 1981*		at No. 18 Southwestern Louisiana; Bayou Classic	L 51–57	5–1	Blackham Coliseum; Lafayette, Louisiana
Dec 18, 1981*		Northern Illinois	W 81–56	6–1	Selland Arena; Fresno, California
Dec 21, 1981*		UC Davis	W 75–43	7–1	Selland Arena; Fresno, California
Dec 28, 1981*		New Mexico State	W 48–41	8–1	Selland Arena; Fresno, California
Jan 4, 1982*		Lamar	W 56–36	9–1	Selland Arena; Fresno, California
Jan 7, 1982*		Pepperdine	W 63–46	10–1	Selland Arena; Fresno, California
Jan 14, 1982		Pacific	W 74–40	11–1 (1–0)	Selland Arena; Fresno, California
Jan 16, 1982		Utah State	W 71–50	12–1 (2–0)	Selland Arena; Fresno, California
Jan 21, 1982		at UC Santa Barbara	W 40–38	13–1 (3–0)	The Thunderdome; Santa Barbara, California
Jan 23, 1982		at Cal State Fullerton	W 43–40	14–1 (4–0)	Titan Gym; Fullerton, California
Jan 28, 1982		San Jose State	W 63–45	15–1 (5–0)	Selland Arena; Fresno, California
Jan 30, 1982		at San Jose State	W 47–36	16–1 (6–0)	San Jose Civic Auditorium; San Jose, California
Feb 4, 1982		at Long Beach State	L 42–45 ^{OT}	16–2 (6–1)	Long Beach Arena; Long Beach, California
Feb 6, 1982		vs. UC Irvine	W 55–49 ^{OT}	17–2 (7–1)	Long Beach Arena (8,456); Long Beach, California
Feb 27, 1982		at Utah State	W 73–61	24–2 (13–1)	Dee Glen Smith Spectrum; Logan, Utah
PCAA Tournament
Mar 5, 1982*	(1) No. 12	vs. (5) Long Beach State; Semifinals	W 76–55	25–2	Anaheim Convention Center; Anaheim, California
Mar 6, 1982*	(1) No. 12	vs. (3) Cal State Fullerton; Championship game	W 69–57	26–2	Anaheim Convention Center; Anaheim, California
NCAA Tournament
Mar 13, 1982*	(4 W) No. 11	vs. (5 W) No. 14 West Virginia; Second round	W 50–46	27–2	Dee Glen Smith Spectrum; Logan, Utah
Mar 18, 1982*; 10:40 pm, CBS	(4 W) No. 11	vs. (1 W) No. 6 Georgetown; West Regional semifinal – Sweet Sixteen	L 40–58	27–3	Marriott Center (15,237); Provo, Utah
*Non-conference game. ^{#}Rankings from AP Poll. (#) Tournament seedings in parentheses. W=West. All times are in Pacific Time.

== NBA draft ==
Round	Pick	Player	NBA club
2	31	Rod Higgins	Chicago Bulls
