= Kevin Olekaibe =

American basketball player

Free agent
- Position: Point guard

Personal information
- Born: July 28, 1992 (age 34) Oakland, California, U.S.
- Listed height: 6 ft 2 in (1.88 m)
- Listed weight: 180 lb (82 kg)

Career information
- High school: Cimarron-Memorial (Las Vegas, Nevada)
- College: Fresno State (2010–2013); UNLV (2013–2014)
- NBA draft: 2014: undrafted
- Playing career: 2014–present

Career history
- 2014–2018: Canton Charge
- 2018–2019: Long Island Nets
- 2019: Westchester Knicks

Career highlights
- Second-team All-WAC (2012)

Kevin Olekaibe (born July 28, 1992) is an American professional basketball player who last played for the Westchester Knicks of the NBA G League. He played college basketball for Fresno State University and the University of Nevada, Las Vegas (UNLV).

== High school ==
In his final year at Cimarron-Memorial High School, Olekaibe averaged 35.6 points, 6.8 rebounds, 4.8 assists and 3.6 steals per game. He shot 50% from the field, 37% percent from beyond the three-point line, and 81% from the free-throw line. He also scored at least 50 points twice and 40 points nine times during his senior season. Olekaibe graduated in 2010 as the school's all-time leading scorer with 1,779 points and made the school's honor roll.

== College career ==
=== Fresno State ===
Olekaibe enrolled at Fresno State in 2010. During his first season, he played in 30 out of 31 games including 19 starts. He averaged 12.0 points, 1.9 rebounds, and 1.3 assists in his first season with the Bulldogs. Olekaibe shot 38.6% from the field, 32.8% from the three, and 76.7% from the free-throw line. In his second season at Fresno State, Olekaibe started in all 33 games and averaged 17.8 points, 3.2 rebounds, 1.2 assists, and 1.3 steals. In a game against Arizona State, Olekaibe scored 21 points in the second half to bring his total to 30 and hit the game-winning three-pointer to notch a win for the Bulldogs. In a game against Seattle on February 23, 2012, Olekaibe set a Fresno State record when he scored 43 points. He was also named to the All-WAC Second Team in his sophomore year. In his third, and what proved to be final, season with the Bulldogs, Olekaibe played in all 30 games including 24 starts. For the season, he averaged 8.3 points, 2.1 rebounds, 1.3 assists, and 1.1 steals per game. He also shot 34.7% from the field, 34.4% from the three, and 83.3% from the free-throw line. He scored 1,169 points while at Fresno State.

=== University of Nevada, Las Vegas ===
For the 2013–14 season, Olekaibe transferred to UNLV. The NCAA approved a waiver applied by the school to allow Olekaibe to play for the team immediately. In his debut, he started in the place of injured Bryce Dejean-Jones and scored 17 points. He started in 32 of the team's 33 games and averaged 10.2 points, 2.3 rebounds, 2.3 assists, and 0.7 steals per game while shooting 38.3% from the field, 35.7% from the three, and 73.6% from the free-throw line. Olekaibe graduated in 2014.

=== College statistics ===
Year	Team	GP	GS	MPG	FG%	3P%	FT%	RPG	APG	SPG	BPG	PPG
2010–11	Fresno State	30	19	25.1	.386	.328	.767	1.9	1.8	1.2	.2	12.0
2011-12	Fresno State	33	33	36.5	.338	.797	.643	3.2	1.2	1.3	.1	17.8
2012-13	Fresno State	30	24	24.9	.347	.344	.833	2.1	1.3	1.1	.1	8.3
2013-14	UNLV	33	32	30.6	.383	.357	.736	2.3	2.1	.7	.1	10.2
Career		126	108	29.5	.373	.342	.784	2.4	1.5	1.1	.1	12.2

== Professional career ==
=== Canton Charge (2014–2018) ===
After going undrafted in 2014, Olekaibe played one game for the Milwaukee Bucks's Summer League team and recorded one point in one minute. The NBA Development League's Canton Charge selected Olekaibe in the sixth round of the 2014 NBA Development League Draft, where he has been playing since. Olekaibe participated in the 2015 NBA D-League Slam Dunk Contest., On February 14, 2018, he scored a career high 33 against the Delaware 87ers.

=== Long Island Nets (2018–2019) ===
On December 30, 2018, Olekaibe signed with the Long Island Nets with a roster hardship exception. On January 25, 2019, Olekaibe was re-signed by the Long Island Nets.

== Personal life ==
Olekaibe was born to Benson and Esther Olekaibe, who are originally from Nigeria. His older brothers, Ike and Emmanuel both played college basketball. Ike was a two-time All-American at Purdue and Emmanuel played for Southwestern Oregon Community College and Everest College. Olekaibe has four other siblings: Victoria, Ruth, John, and Kenneth.
