= Rahsaan Smith =

American basketball player

Rahsaan Smith (born August 11, 1973) is an American professional basketball player. He is 2.08 m (6 ft 10 in) in height and he weighs 106 kg (234 lb). He plays the center position. His last team was Galgos de Tijuana of the Mexican League.

== College career ==
After spending two years at Merritt College, Smith moved to Fresno State University in 1994 and stayed there three years.

== Professional career ==
Besides playing professional basketball in Mexico, Smith has played in Germany (Bayer Leverkusen), the United States (Yakima Sun Kings, Southern California Surf), Argentina (CS Independiente de General Pico, Quilmes Mar del Plata), Saudi Arabia (Al-Ittihad) and Poland (Brok Czarni Slupsk).

== Accomplishments ==
Besides winning the CBA title in 2000, Smith was named MVP of the Saudi Arabian league in 2001.
