= Nate Grimes =

American basketball player

Keravnos
- Position: Power forward
- League: Cyprus Basketball Division A

Personal information
- Born: May 1, 1996 (age 30) Las Vegas, Nevada, U.S.
- Listed height: 6 ft 8 in (2.03 m)
- Listed weight: 227 lb (103 kg)

Career information
- High school: Desert Pines (Las Vegas, Nevada); Quality Education Academy (Winston-Salem, North Carolina)
- College: Fresno State (2016–2020)
- NBA draft: 2020: undrafted
- Playing career: 2020–present

Career history
- 2020–2021: Kobrat
- 2021–2022: Kangoeroes Basket Mechelen
- 2022: BG Göttingen
- 2022–2023: Hapoel Eilat
- 2023: Sigal Prishtina
- 2023: Iwate Big Bulls
- 2024: Golden Eagle Ylli
- 2024–2025: Assigeco Piacenza
- 2025: Borneo Hornbills
- 2025: El Calor de Cancún
- 2025–2026: Körmend
- 2026–present: Keravnos

Career highlights
- 2× Third-team All-Mountain West (2019, 2020)

Nathanial Paul Grimes (born May 1, 1996) is an American professional basketball player for Keravnos of the Cyprus Basketball Division A. He played college basketball for the Fresno State Bulldogs.

== Early life ==
Grimes began his high school career at Desert Pines High School in Las Vegas, Nevada. For his senior season, Grimes transferred to Quality Education Academy in Winston-Salem, North Carolina, with whom in 24 games he averaged 13.6 points, 9.3 rebounds, 1.7 steals, and 1.4 assists per game. In September 2014, he committed to play college basketball at Fresno State over offers from Boise State, Iowa, San Francisco, Utah State, Washington State and Wichita State.

== College career ==
Grimes redshirted his freshman season. He averaged 1.7 points and 1.8 rebounds per game as a redshirt freshman. As a sophomore, Grimes averaged 4.6 points, 5.4 rebounds, and 1.1 blocks (7th in the conference) per game. He was third in the country in total rebounds per minute (0.44 rebounds per minute played).

He averaged 11.8 points, 9.2 rebounds per game (3rd in the conference), and 1.7 blocks per game (2nd), while leading the conference with a two-point .625 field goal percentage, as a junior. On January 25, 2020, Grimes was suspended for one game for conduct detrimental to the team.

As a senior, he averaged 11.5 points and 10.2 rebounds per game (3rd in the conference), while leading the conference with 1.6 blocks per game. Grimes was named to the Third Team All-Mountain West by the media. On March 16, 2020, Grimes was arrested and charged on suspicion of inflicting corporal injury to a spouse/cohabitant.

== Professional career ==
On September 24, 2020, Grimes signed his first professional contract with Kobrat of the Korisliiga. He averaged 16.7 points, 12.6 rebounds and 1.7 assists per game.

On June 30, 2021, Grimes signed with Kangoeroes Basket Mechelen of the BNXT League. He averaged 18.0 points, 11.9 rebounds, 1.4 steals, and 1.0 block per game in eight games.

On February 19, 2022, Grimes signed with BG Göttingen of the Basketball Bundesliga. In 16 games he averaged 6.1 points, 5.2 rebounds, 0.5 blocks, and 16.5 minutes per game.

On August 4, 2022, he signed with Hapoel Eilat of the Israeli Basketball Premier League. Grimes joined Sigal Prishtina of the Kosovo Basketball League on February 6, 2023.

On July 10, 2023, Grimes signed with Iwate Big Bulls of the Japanese B.League. On November 17, his contract was terminated.

On July 22, 2024, Grimes signed with the Assigeco Piacenza of the Serie A2. On January 16, 2025, his contract was terminated. On March 9, he signed with the Borneo Hornbills of the Indonesian Basketball League (IBL), replacing Devondrick Walker.
