= 1980–81 Fresno State Bulldogs men's basketball team =

American college basketball season

1980–81 Fresno State Bulldogs men's basketball

PCAA Regular season champion PCAA tournament champion

NCAA tournament, Second round
- Conference: Pacific Coast Athletic Association Conference
- Record: 25–4 (12–2 PCAA)
- Head coach: Boyd Grant (4th season)
- Home arena: Selland Arena

1980–81 Pacific Coast Athletic Association men's basketball standings
	Conf.				Overall
Team	W		L	PCT	W		L	PCT
Fresno State†	12	–	2	.857	25	–	4	.862
San Jose State	10	–	4	.714	21	–	9	.700
UC Irvine	9	–	5	.643	17	–	10	.630
Long Beach State	9	–	5	.643	15	–	13	.536
Utah State	5	–	9	.357	12	–	16	.429
UC Santa Barbara	5	–	9	.357	11	–	16	.407
Pacific	4	–	10	.286	14	–	13	.519
Cal State Fullerton	2	–	12	.143	4	–	23	.148
† 1981 PCAA tournament winner

The 1980–81 Fresno State Bulldogs men's basketball team represented California State University, Fresno during the 1980–81 NCAA Division I men's basketball season. This was head coach Boyd Grant's fourth season at Fresno State. The Bulldogs played their home games at Selland Arena and were members of the Pacific Coast Athletic Association. They finished the season 25–4, 12–2 in PCAA play to win the conference regular season statute title. They defeated San Jose State to win the PCAA tournament and earn the conference's automatic bid to the NCAA tournament. The Bulldogs were upset in the opening round by Northeastern, 55–53.

== Roster ==
1980–81 Fresno State Bulldogs men's basketball team
Players
Coaches

Pos.	#	Name	Height	Weight	Year	Previous school	Hometown
F	22	Rod Higgins	6 ft 7 in (2.01 m)	195 lb (88 kg)	RS Jr	Thornton Township	Harvey, Illinois
F	34	Bernard Thompson	6 ft 6 in (1.98 m)	200 lb (91 kg)	RS Fr	South Mountain HS	Phoenix, Arizona
F		Pete Verhoeven	6 ft 9 in (2.06 m)	—	RS Sr

Head coach

- Boyd Grant (Colorado State)

Assistant coach(es)

Legend

- (C) Team captain
- (S) Suspended
- (I) Ineligible
- (W) Walk-on
- Injured
- Current redshirt

Roster

== Schedule and results ==
Date time, TV	Rank^{#}	Opponent^{#}	Result	Record	Site city, state
Regular season
Nov 28, 1980*		Air Force	W 55–40	1–0	Selland Arena; Fresno, California
Nov 29, 1980*		Portland State	W 96–65	2–0	Selland Arena; Fresno, California
Dec 1, 1980*		at Arizona	W 77–65	3–0	McKale Center; Tucson, Arizona
Dec 6, 1980*		at Boise State	W 65–40	4–0	Bronco Gym; Boise, Idaho
Dec 9, 1980*		Arizona	W 70–60	5–0	Selland Arena; Fresno, California
Dec 20, 1980*		Mississippi State	W 58–45	6–0	Selland Arena; Fresno, California
Dec 29, 1980*		at Northern Illinois	W 71–59	7–0	Chick Evans Field House; DeKalb, Illinois
Dec 31, 1980*		at Kansas State	L 39–47	7–1	Ahearn Field House; Manhattan, Kansas
PCAA Tournament
Mar 6, 1981*		vs. Utah State; Semifinals	W 71–57	20–3	Anaheim Convention Center; Anaheim, California
Mar 7, 1981*		vs. San Jose State; Championship game	W 52–48	25–3	Anaheim Convention Center; Anaheim, California
NCAA Tournament
Mar 13, 1981*	(6 W)	vs. (11 W) Northeastern; First round	L 53–55	25–4	Special Events Center; El Paso, Texas
*Non-conference game. ^{#}Rankings from AP Poll. (#) Tournament seedings in parentheses. W=West.

== NBA draft ==
Round	Pick	Player	NBA club
4	85	Peter Verhoeven	Portland Trail Blazers
