= Pan American Center =

Arena in New Mexico, United States

- "Pandemonium Center"
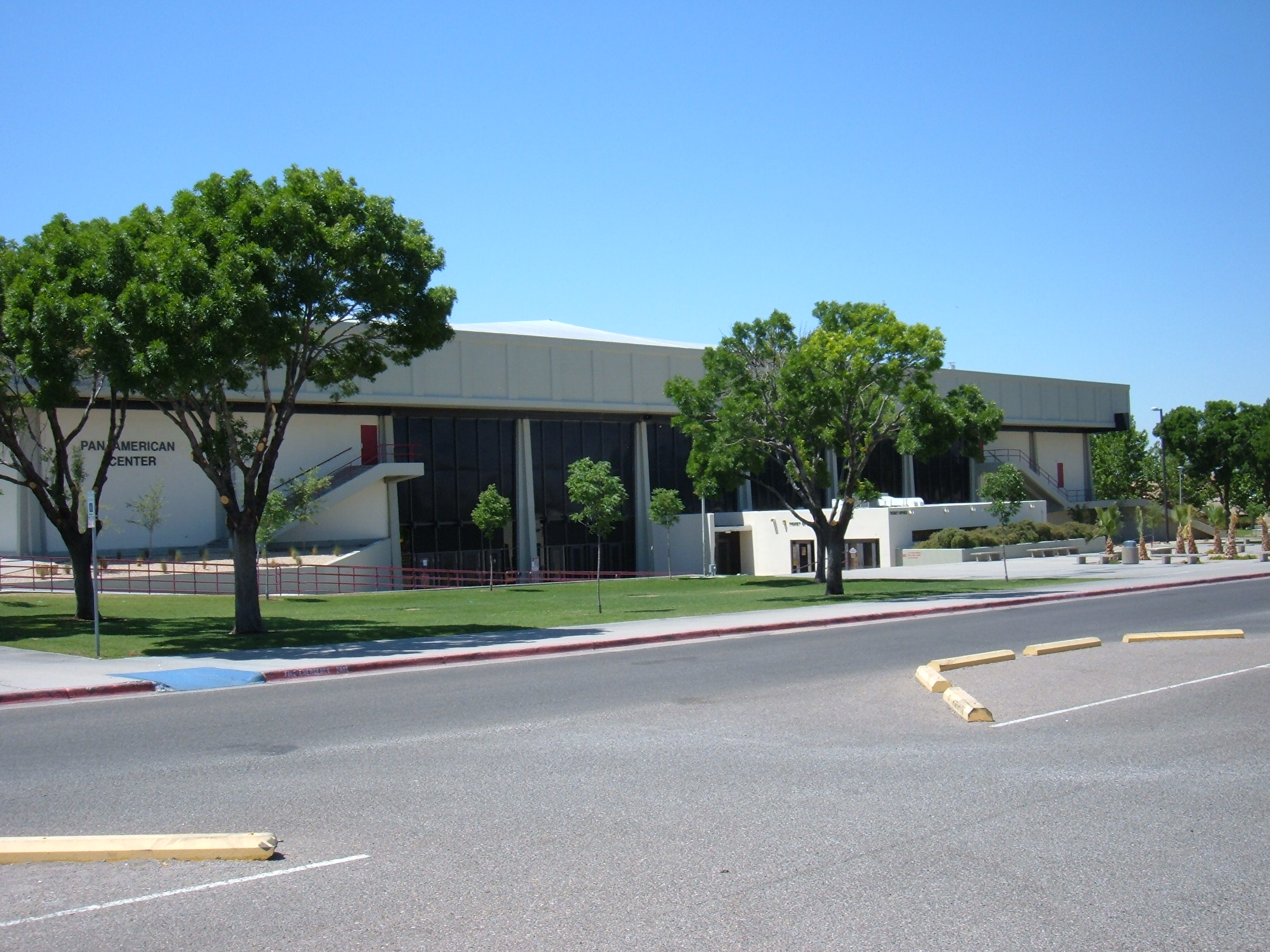
- Interactive map of Pan American Center
- Location: 1810 East University Avenue, Las Cruces, NM 88003
- Coordinates: 32°17′2.40″N 106°44′31.92″W
- Owner: New Mexico State University
- Operator: New Mexico State University
- Capacity: 12,482 (current); 13,071 (pre-renovation)
- Surface: Maple Parquet court (basketball); Taraflex (volleyball, 2023-present)

Construction
- Opened: November 30, 1968
- Cost: $3.5 million
- Architects: W.C. Kruger and Associates (original); SMPC Architects and HOK Sport/Venue/Event (renovation)

Tenant
- New Mexico State Aggies (NCAA) (1968–present)

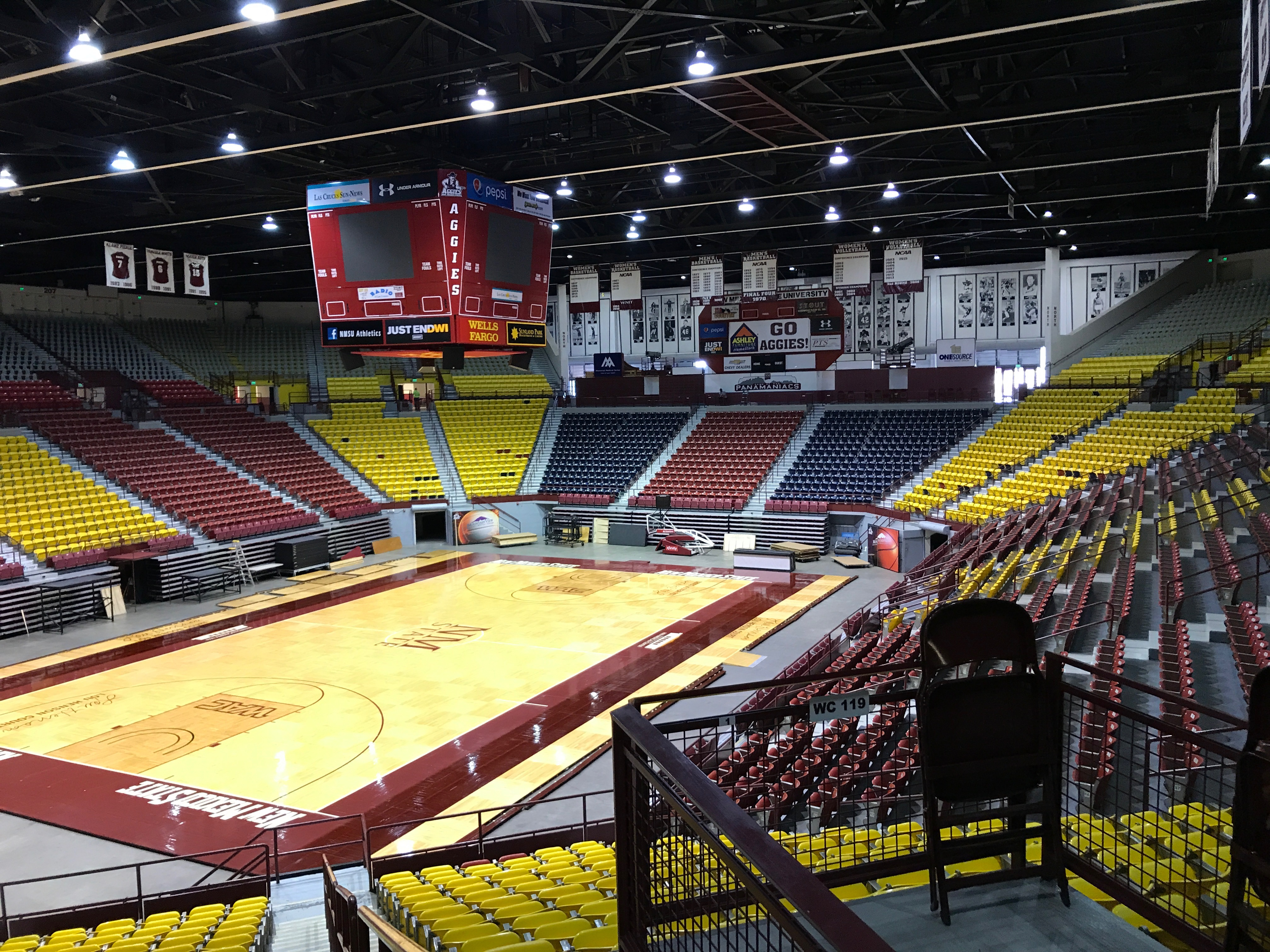
Lou Henson Court in the Pan American Center

Pan American Center is a multi–purpose arena in Las Cruces, New Mexico, located on the campus of New Mexico State University. The arena has a current seating capacity of 12,515 people.

The arena serves as home of the New Mexico State Aggies men's and women's basketball and women's volleyball teams. The arena hosted games of the NCAA men's basketball tournament in 1969 and 1972, as well as the 2007 and 2008 Western Athletic Conference men's and women's basketball tournaments and 2007, 2016, and 2021 WAC volleyball tournaments.

== Predecessor Facilities ==
New Mexico A&M's first gymnasium was housed on the upper floor of what came to be known as the Armory, built in 1911 as one of several early campus buildings designed by Trost & Trost. That building still stands today and is now part of the Music Center, housing faculty offices and practice rooms.

In 1938 Williams Gymnasium was constructed north of Quesenberry Field, then home of the Aggie football team, and would serve as Aggie basketball's home for the next thirty years. Williams Gym would later be renamed Williams Hall and renovated to house the art department in 1972. The structure would ultimately be demolished January 2020 after the art department had moved into the newly built Devasthali Hall the previous year.

== Construction ==
By the late 1950s, the need for a new and larger on-campus arena at what was then New Mexico A&M had become evident. Williams Gymnasium had become too small as the school and its athletic programs grew. After Las Cruces High School opened a new campus less than one mile from A&M's campus in 1957, the Aggies began to play many of their home games in the high school's new 3,000–seat gymnasium, including an NCAA Tournament game against Idaho State in 1959.

When alumnus Lou Henson returned to the school—which by then had been renamed New Mexico State—as head coach in 1966 and quickly began building the basketball program into a perennial NCAA tournament participant, the push for a new facility began in earnest. In 1967, the New Mexico State Legislature approved a $22 million capital outlay program that included provisions for a new arena at NMSU (the same bill also funded construction of NMSU's student union building). Construction of the arena cost $3.5 million and the building was inaugurated on November 30, 1968, with a 95–89 victory over Colorado State. The facility's name was suggested by former NMSU vice president Paul Rader for its location just off Interstate 25, also known as the Pan American Highway.

== History ==
The university's investment paid quick dividends as the Aggies won their first ten games in the new building before falling to archrival New Mexico on January 29. The Aggies wouldn't lose again on the Pan Am's parquet floor until dropping the 1971–72 season opener to Angelo State, snapping an amazing 34–game home winning streak over the course of three seasons. During the Pan Am's first three seasons NMSU compiled a gaudy 44–1 record within its friendly confines. The Aggies qualified for their third consecutive NCAA Tournament in the building's inaugural year and hosted BYU in an opening round matchup at the Pan Am on March 8, 1969 – a 74–62 Aggie victory. The next year saw the most successful season in school history to date as the "Amazin' Aggies" advanced to the NCAA Final Four before falling to eventual national champion UCLA in the national semifinal. Three days later the Aggies bounced back to defeat St. Bonaventure in the now–defunct Consolation game to finish the season third in the nation.

Although the phenomenal success enjoyed by the Aggies during the arena's first few seasons would not continue, the Pan Am would continue to establish a reputation as an extremely difficult place to play. Since 1968 the Aggies have compiled four undefeated seasons at home while only twice having a losing home record. NMSU's women's basketball team has also compiled a pair of undefeated home seasons in the building. The Pan Am has seen home winning streaks of more than 25 games on three separate occasions – twice by the men's basketball team (34 games from 1968 to 1971 and 29 games from 1989 to 1991) and once by the women's basketball team (38 games from 1986 to 1988). Among the most memorable games in the Pan Am's history are NMSU's heartbreaking 91–89 overtime loss to Larry Bird's #2–ranked Indiana State squad on February 2, 1979 (the then-undefeated Sycamores' closest call until losing to Michigan State in that year's legendary national title game); a 72–64 win over New Mexico on December 15, 1990, that saw an all–time record 14,845 fans squeeze into the arena, a nationally televised 83–82 upset of #7–ranked eventual national champion UNLV on January 8, 1990, and the Aggies' thrilling 72–70 defeat of Utah State in the 2007 WAC tournament championship game that clinched the Aggies' seventeenth NCAA Tournament appearance.

During the Aggies' run of success in the early 1990s the Pan Am became known as one of the toughest venues in the nation for visiting teams. The often–raucous crowds led Dick Vitale to nickname the building the "Pandemonium Center" and refer to the student section as the "Panamaniacs." Vitale named the building the Big West Conference's toughest venue in the 1998 and 1999 editions of Dick Vitale's College Basketball Preview.

== Playing floor ==
Throughout its history the Pan American Center has featured a distinctive parquet–style playing floor, making it one of only a handful of NCAA venues to feature a parquet floor. The court was named in honor of former long-time head coach Lou Henson in 2001.

The original floor was installed in 1968 and served until being damaged in a flood inside the arena in 1986. Following the flood a new floor was acquired and installed during the 1986–87 season. This floor served through the end of the 2011 volleyball season and basketball preseason exhibition games. A new parquet floor, the arena's third, was dedicated prior to the 2011–12 men's basketball regular season home opener against UTEP on November 19, 2011. That floor was irreparably damaged in the summer of 2021 when a steam pipe burst inside the building, leading to excess humidity levels which caused the floor to warp and rendering it unplayable. After a temporary, non-parquet floor was used for the 2021-22 volleyball and basketball seasons a new parquet floor, the building's fourth, was installed in the summer of 2022. A new Taraflex overlay floor for volleyball was installed in spring 2023 and first used during the team's spring exhibition season that year.

== 2006–07 renovation ==
In 2005, the New Mexico State Legislature approved funding for a $23 million renovation of the Pan American Center. Included in the renovation was the construction of a new annex at the building's south end housing new locker room facilities, a practice court, athletic and special events offices, and support facilities. Additionally, the older part of the arena was thoroughly renovated, more than tripling the number of restrooms and concession facilities in the building and adding a new, larger concourse around the circumference of the arena. The renovations caused a brief throwback to the 1960s pre–Pan Am era, as several events (most notably virtually the entire 2006 home volleyball schedule) were moved to Las Cruces High School, as NMSU lacks another facility on campus that could accommodate any significant number of fans. The LCHS arrangement proved a very beneficial one in terms of on-court success as the volleyball Aggies compiled the first undefeated home season in school history while playing all but two home matches at LCHS, including an epic 5-game upset of Hawaii that ended its eight–year WAC winning streak.

Although the renovation was scheduled for completion by the beginning of the 2006–07 basketball season construction delays caused the renovation to drag on throughout the season, though the men's and women's basketball teams were still able to play their home schedules in the building. Most controversially, the access tunnel linking the new locker rooms in the annex to the arena floor was not completed until February, forcing both the Aggies and the opposition, along with the referees, to enter the arena via the stands for much of the season. Due to the building's layout, opposing teams had to enter and leave the court through the student section behind the south goal, causing several visiting teams (particularly WAC opponents) to publicly complain about the arrangement. The new tunnel was first used for the January 31 game against Boise State. The renovations were ultimately completed just in time for the start of the 2007 WAC Tournament, with finishing touches being applied in the final days before the event began.

== 2022 renovation ==
In 2022, an anonymous 2.9 million dollar philanthropic donation was given to the NMSU foundation to fund the creation of suites as well as premium club seating on the north end of Pan American Center. The new suite seating will seat 32 guests. Construction began in March 2022 and was finished in the winter of 2022.

== Other events ==
In addition to its extensive history as a collegiate basketball venue, the Pan American Center has been a host to a wide variety of concerts and special events in its five decades of service. The list of entertainers to have performed at the Pan Am includes Metallica, Rod Stewart, Van Halen, Bon Jovi, Garth Brooks, Whitney Houston, Elton John, Prince, George Strait, Tina Turner, U2, and Carrie Underwood.

Among the other notable events held in the arena are the 1996 Miss Teen USA pageant, presidential speeches (including a campaign stop by George W. Bush in 2004), and multiple professional boxing and wrestling events, including the nationally televised professional boxing debut of NFL star Ed "Too Tall" Jones in 1979. The arena also hosts the university's annual fall and spring commencement ceremonies.

== See also ==
- List of NCAA Division I basketball arenas
