= The Last Dance (miniseries) =

2020 sports documentary miniseries

- Promotional poster
- Genre: Television documentary Miniseries
- Directed by: Jason Hehir
- Composer: Thomas Caffey
- Country of origin: United States
- Original language: English
- No. of seasons: 1
- No. of episodes: 10

Production
- Producers: Michael Tollin; Jon Weinbach; Peter Guber; Curtis Polk; Estee Portnoy; Andy Thompson; Gregg Winik; Connor Schell; John Dahl; Jason Hehir; Nina Krstic; Matt Maxson; Jacob Rogal
- Cinematography: Thomas McCallum; Vincent Guglielmina; Michael Winik; Peter Winik
- Editors: Chad Beck; Devin Concannon; Abhay Sofsky; Ben Sozanski
- Camera setup: Single-camera
- Running time: 48–50 minutes
- Production companies: ESPN Films; Netflix; Mandalay Sports Media; Jump 23; NBA Entertainment

Original release
- Network: ESPN
- Release: April 19 – May 17, 2020

The Last Dance is a 2020 American sports television documentary miniseries co-produced by ESPN Films and Netflix. Directed by Jason Hehir, the series revolves around Michael Jordan's career, with particular focus on the 1997–98 season, his final season with the Chicago Bulls. The series features exclusive footage from a film crew with an all-access pass to the Bulls, and interviews of many NBA personalities, including Jordan's teammates (Scottie Pippen, Dennis Rodman, Steve Kerr) and then-Bulls head coach Phil Jackson.

The Last Dance aired on ESPN from April 19 to May 17, 2020, in the United States, while its episodes were released on Netflix internationally the day after their American airings; beginning on May 23, two episodes were aired back-to-back on ESPN's corporate partner ABC. ESPN2 aired an alternate version of the series intended for family viewing, which removed most of the profanity heard in the episodes. The series became available on Netflix in the United States on July 19, 2020.

The series was met with critical acclaim, with praise for its directing and editing, and also for the timing of the release—during the initial weeks of quarantine during the COVID-19 pandemic when viewers were struggling to find entertainment. The Last Dance won the Primetime Emmy Award for Outstanding Documentary or Nonfiction Series at the 72nd Primetime Emmy Awards.

However, The Last Dance received heavy criticism from many of Jordan’s former Bulls teammates, who disputed the series's accuracy and focus on Jordan. Much of the hostility stemmed from the expectation that the documentary would center exclusively on the 1997–98 Bulls season rather than be an account of Jordan's life and career. The series's creators were also accused of portraying multiple key players of that era in an unfairly negative fashion while being excessively deferential to Jordan.

== Synopsis ==
The docuseries gives an account of Michael Jordan's career and the Chicago Bulls, using never-before aired footage from the 1997–98 Bulls season, his final season with the team.

== Interviews ==
This is the list of the 90 persons interviewed for the documentary, listed by air time.

- Michael Jordan
- Steve Kerr
- Phil Jackson
- Scottie Pippen
- Jerry Reinsdorf
- David Aldridge
- Dennis Rodman
- B. J. Armstrong
- Mark Vancil
- Reggie Miller
- Michael Wilbon
- Andrea Kremer
- John Paxson
- Sam Smith
- Horace Grant
- Rick Telander
- Ahmad Rashad
- Tim Grover
- Rod Thorn
- Deloris Jordan
- Bill Wennington
- Doug Collins
- David Falk
- Isiah Thomas
- Magic Johnson
- Toni Kukoč
- Will Perdue
- Barack Obama (as former Chicago resident)
- J. A. Adande
- George Koehler
- Brian McIntyre
- Bob Costas
- Todd Boyd
- Larry Bird
- John Salley
- Gary Payton
- David Stern
- Ann Kerr
- James Worthy
- Joe O'Neil
- Roy Johnson
- Chip Schaefer
- Kobe Bryant
- Tim Hallam
- Jalen Rose
- Charley Rosen
- Charles Barkley
- John Stockton
- Roy Williams
- Tisher Lett
- Willow Bay
- Carmen Electra
- Bill Cartwright
- Jud Buechler
- Jim Stack
- Mike Barnett
- Scott Burrell
- Terry Francona
- Brendan Malone
- Danny Ainge
- Howard White
- Melissa Isaacson
- Ronnie Martin
- Rod Higgins
- Glen Rice
- Patrick Ewing
- Ronnie Jordan
- Hannah Storm
- Steve East
- Larry Jordan
- Billy Pippen
- Fred Lynch
- Buzz Peterson
- Sidney Moncrief
- Nas
- Ron Harper
- John A. Hefferon
- Bill Clinton (as former Arkansas Governor)
- Pat Riley
- Adam Silver
- Marcus Jordan
- Joe Kleine
- Charles Oakley
- Jasmine Jordan
- Justin Timberlake
- Billy Packer
- Ron Coley
- Joe Pytka
- Kevin Loughery
- Jeffrey Jordan

== Episodes ==
Episodes of The Last Dance
No.	Title	Directed by	Original release date	U.S. viewers (millions)
1	"Episode I"	Jason Hehir	April 19, 2020	5.73
Flashbacks chronicle Michael Jordan's college and early NBA days. The Bulls make a preseason trip to Paris amid tension with GM Jerry Krause.
2	"Episode II"	Jason Hehir	April 19, 2020	5.12
Scottie Pippen rises to become one of the NBA's best players. An injury early in Jordan's career shows distrust with Bulls management.
3	"Episode III"	Jason Hehir	April 26, 2020	5.31
Dennis Rodman's attitude and energy help the team win, but bring the drama off the court. The Bulls struggle to overcome the Pistons in the late '80s.
4	"Episode IV"	Jason Hehir	April 26, 2020	4.86
Phil Jackson's unique philosophy and demeanor take the Bulls to the next level. The team finally gets past Detroit and earns a shot at an NBA title, which is a dream matchup against Magic Johnson and the Lakers.
5	"Episode V"	Jason Hehir	May 3, 2020	4.91
From Air Jordan and Be Like Mike to the 1992 NBA Finals and the Olympic dream team, Jordan becomes a global cultural icon unlike any other. This episode was dedicated to Kobe Bryant as he was featured in the 1998 All-Star game. He died in January 2020.
6	"Episode VI"	Jason Hehir	May 3, 2020	4.44
A revealing book and scrutiny of his gambling put a dent in Jordan's reputation, but he remains focused on winning a third straight title in 1993.
7	"Episode VII"	Jason Hehir	May 10, 2020	4.41
Crushed by the death of his father, a mentally exhausted Jordan retires in 1993 – to play baseball. The Bulls move on with Pippen in the lead role.
8	"Episode VIII"	Jason Hehir	May 10, 2020	4.16
Jordan's return energizes the Bulls, the city and the NBA, but a playoff loss in 1995 fuels him to work harder than ever to get back on top; this is rewarded with their fourth NBA championship over Seattle in 1996, after a record-breaking 72-win season.
9	"Episode IX"	Jason Hehir	May 17, 2020	5.02
The Bulls face stiff challenges to their reign in 1997 against Utah and in 1998 versus Indiana. Role player Steve Kerr makes his mark on the dynasty. Jordan struggles as his bodyguard Gus Lett is diagnosed with cancer.
10	"Episode X"	Jason Hehir	May 17, 2020	4.59
Battered and exhausted, the Bulls conclude their "Last Dance" with a sixth championship. Jordan, Jackson, and others reflect on the end of their dynasty.

== Production and release ==
The Last Dance features interviews and never-released footage from the 1997–98 Chicago Bulls season. Over 500 hours of all-access footage was filmed and used to create the 10-part documentary series. According to Adam Silver (now NBA Commissioner, but then the head of NBA Entertainment), Jordan allowed the filming with the agreement that the footage would only be used with his direct permission. After many years, and many refusals from Jordan, he agreed in 2016 to a documentary proposal from Mike Tollin.

ESPN and Netflix announced their joint production of the 10-part documentary series in May 2018, with the official teaser trailer being released on December 25, 2018. The release date was pushed back to June 2020 after another trailer was released in December 2019. However, because of the impact of the COVID-19 pandemic, ESPN released the final trailer on March 31, 2020 and moved the premiere to April 19, 2020, releasing the following statement:

As society navigates this time without live sports, viewers are still looking to the sports world to escape and enjoy a collective experience. We've heard the calls from fans asking us to move up the release date for this series, and we’re happy to announce that we’ve been able to accelerate the production schedule to do just that. This project celebrates one of the greatest players and dynasties ever, and we hope it can serve as a unifying entertainment experience to fill the role that sports often play in our lives, telling a story that will captivate everyone, not just sports fans.

The series was released weekly from April 19, 2020 to May 17, 2020, with two episodes airing each Sunday. Outside of the United States, the episodes were released on Netflix the day after their ESPN airing. ESPN2 aired a censored version of the documentary alongside the ESPN broadcast. The censored version was also aired on ABC. Jordan made a $25 million donation to Friends of the Children, a nonprofit organization, from funds raised based on the creation of the miniseries.

According to Hehir, Jordan refused to film interviews in his home to maintain privacy. The interviews were filmed in three houses, one rented by the production and two others which were homes of friends of the production. The fifth episode is dedicated to Kobe Bryant, who died in a helicopter crash on January 26, 2020. Bryant's interview was featured in the episode's opening.

== Reception ==
=== Critical response ===
On review aggregator Rotten Tomatoes, the series holds an approval rating of 97% based on 62 reviews, with an average rating of 8.85/10. The website's critics consensus reads: "A compelling and comprehensive portrait of one of basketball's great teams, The Last Dance's blend of archival footage and candid interviews confirms there's nobody quite like Mike or the team he led to victory." Metacritic, which uses a weighted average, assigned the series a score of 91 out of 100 based on 12 critics, indicating "universal acclaim".

Writing for Consequence of Sound, Robert Daniels gave The Last Dance a perfect score, calling the series "beautifully composed and edited together" and a "pulsating celebration of greatness." Similarly, Alex Pattle of The Independent praised director Jason Hehir, writing that "Hehir's fear of being formulaic fosters a compelling freshness, and his ability to subtly segue between tones ensures Jordan's auras of magnetism and intensity are highlighted at the appropriate moments", while Brian Lowry of CNN gave the series five stars out of five, saying that "it's a very, very deep dive, but for fans who will eat this stuff up, it hits all the right notes."

The Chicago Sun-Times's Richard Roeper gave the series three and a half stars out of four, writing that "while some might question whether even one of the great team sports dynasties of all time merits such a lengthy treatment, if anything each episode left me wanting more. Not only were the Bulls a team for the ages, they also gave us a sports soap opera for the ages." Daniel Fienberg of The Hollywood Reporter gave the series a positive review, writing that "it's a tremendously engaging, ridiculously fun assemblage of spectacular basketball footage and reasonably introspective interviews with almost everybody you'd hope to hear from on the subject." Writing for The New York Times, Wesley Morris wrote that "Hehir has this trick where any time someone says something debatable or controversial or simply worthy of running by [Michael] Jordan, he hands him an iPad and makes him watch what was said. And every time Hehir does it, Jordan turns the reaction into gold. He's an incredulous Zeus in these moments, lightning bolts falling from his toga as he laughs, zapping lesser gods."

Conversely, filmmaker Ken Burns criticized Michael Jordan's involvement in the production of the series, saying that "if you are there influencing the very fact of it getting made, it means that certain aspects that you don't necessarily want in aren't going to be in [...] and that's not the way you do good journalism." Specifically, Burns pointed to Jordan's production company, Jump 23, being listed as a partner in the series. Hehir would respond to such speculations stating "I ran into zero stop signs in the editorial process. Michael was involved, but in a distant satellite-level while making it. He never came close to the editing room and only received cuts as they were about to go on air. I think Michael is above the fray when it comes to what he wants in and out.”

=== Criticism by former teammates ===
The Last Dance drew positive reactions from active NBA players, impressed by Jordan's accomplishments, and thankful for the series providing much-needed entertainment in the initial quarantine period of the COVID-19 pandemic. However, the other Chicago Bulls players on the Last Dance team who personally experienced all of the events that took place in the docu-series publicly disagreed with much of the docu-series' version of events, and placed the blame on Jordan for molding questionable narratives.

Scottie Pippen was reportedly "wounded and disappointed" by his portrayal in the series, although he did not make any public remarks during the documentary's airing. Pippen later denied any rift between himself and Jordan over the documentary; however, he told Jordan he was not pleased with the docuseries and considered it to be "about Michael trying to uplift himself”.

Pippen would go on to aggressively criticize Jordan in the following years. In 2021, he wrote an autobiography, Unguarded, which gives his own perspective on the Bulls' dynasty. In the book, he is highly critical of Jordan, calling him selfish, hypocritical and insensitive. In other interviews, Pippen also stated that he thought Kobe Bryant and LeBron James were greater basketball players than Jordan, and said that when Jordan first played for the Bulls, he was a “horrible” player and had poor shot selection.

Horace Grant said that The Last Dance was edited to favor Jordan, remarking that the series was "entertaining, but we know [...] that about 90% of it [was] BS in terms of the realness of it"; he also denied Jordan's accusation that Grant was the source for The Jordan Rules and agreed that Pippen was portrayed unfairly.

Grant also explained on Bill Cartwright's podcast that he initially planned to decline the interview offer, as he was not a member of the Last Dance team. However, after much persistence by the production crew, Grant finally "reluctantly" conceded to interview because he wanted to reminisce about his days as an NBA star. He then said he took an outspoken stance about his disdain for the documentary because he wanted to defend his character and did not agree with the veracity of Jordan's version of events. Grant then doubled down on Jordan by expressing his frustrations about Jordan and the docu-series in a lengthy phone call with Shannon Sharpe.

Cartwright, an assistant coach on the Last Dance team, and also the starting center on the Bulls’ first three-peat team, was reportedly unimpressed with the series, dismissing it as pure entertainment, and said that the series was "really one guy's perspective of what happened." Cartwright also explained in another interview that Jordan had been framing an inaccurate image to the public, and called his play-acting “silly.”

Craig Hodges, a member of the first two championship seasons with the Bulls, said he felt disappointed about not getting an opportunity to be interviewed for the documentary, and further criticized Jordan for discussing the team's use of cocaine during the 1980s, which was also another subject that was not related to the Last Dance season. On the issue of cocaine use, Hodges remarked, "I was thinking about the brothers who [were on the team] with you who have to explain [what happened] to their families”.

Some expressed disappointment over the omission of starting center Luc Longley in the series, including Longley himself. In 2021, an episode of the documentary series Australian Story, titled "Luc Longley and the missing chapter of The Last Dance", was released with Longley's response, including interviews with ex-teammates such as Pippen and Jordan. The documentary was a success in its own right.

Following the positive reception of Longley’s documentary, the Bulls organization released an additional feature documentary on a key member of the Last Dance team, sixth man Toni Kukoč. The documentary was titled “The Waiter”, paying tribute to Kukoč’s nickname acquired in his native country of Croatia.

Others also expressed disappointment in the lack of coverage of another starter on the Last Dance team, point guard Ron Harper. Harper was only included for a few seconds, talking about his time playing for the Cleveland Cavaliers in 1989 when he expressed disagreement with his coach for not assigning him to defend Jordan during The Shot, but never was shown discussing his role in the Bulls' second three-peat. Harper had started all 82 games during the Last Dance season.

There was also criticism for the series' over-emphasis on Steve Kerr, a minor player on the Bulls' last championship team. Those critics alleged that the reasoning behind Kerr's over-emphasis was linked to his recent success as the head coach of the Golden State Warriors. Some compared it to a scenario where ESPN did a documentary on the 1970s Pittsburgh Steelers and placed Tony Dungy (who like Kerr had a successful head coaching career but a lesser playing career) in the same company as Joe Greene, Franco Harris, and Jack Lambert. Kerr himself admitted that the series emphasized him more than what was needed, and also did not condone the absence of Longley and Harper in the series.

Some came to the defense of former Bulls general manager Jerry Krause, accusing Jordan of intentionally delaying the start of the production until Krause died in 2017 in order to prevent him from being able to explain his own version of events. Sports Illustrated questioned Jordan's narrative expressed in the series, called him “cruel”, and said that Krause deserved better treatment.

=== US ratings ===
For the 2019–20 television season, the show tied for fifth among adults 18–49 in the Nielsen ratings with This Is Us, averaging a 2.9 rating and 15 share. It also placed 55th in total viewership, averaging 6.71 million viewers. Variety dubbed the show's performance a "consolation prize" for ESPN given the network's struggle to find live sports. The series also became ESPN's most-watched documentary.

The Last Dance : U.S. viewers per episode (millions)

Viewership and ratings per episode of The Last Dance
No.	Title	Air date	Timeslot (ET)	Rating (18–49)	Viewers (millions)	DVR (18–49)	DVR viewers (millions)	Total (18–49)	Total viewers (millions)	Ref.
1	"Episode I"	April 19, 2020	Sunday 9:00 p.m.	2.6	5.73	0.6	1.51	3.2	7.25	
2	"Episode II"	April 19, 2020	Sunday 10:00 p.m.	2.3	5.17	0.7	1.62	3.0	6.73	
3	"Episode III"	April 26, 2020	Sunday 9:00 p.m.	2.3	5.31	0.8	1.68	3.1	6.99	
4	"Episode IV"	April 26, 2020	Sunday 10:00 p.m.	2.1	4.86	0.9	2.04	3.1	6.90	
5	"Episode V"	May 3, 2020	Sunday 9:00 p.m.	2.1	4.91	0.8	1.78	2.8	6.68	
6	"Episode VI"	May 3, 2020	Sunday 10:00 p.m.	1.9	4.44	0.9	2.00	2.7	6.43	
7	"Episode VII"	May 10, 2020	Sunday 9:00 p.m.	1.9	4.41	0.9	1.88	2.8	6.29	
8	"Episode VIII"	May 10, 2020	Sunday 10:00 p.m.	1.8	4.16	1.0	2.23	2.8	6.39	
9	"Episode IX"	May 17, 2020	Sunday 9:00 p.m.	2.1	5.02	0.8	1.75	2.8	6.77	
10	"Episode X"	May 17, 2020	Sunday 10:00 p.m.	1.9	4.59	0.9	1.98	2.7	6.57	

=== Accolades ===
Accolades for The Last Dance
Award	Date of ceremony	Category	Recipient(s)	Result	Ref.
AAFCA Awards	August 22, 2020	Best Documentary	The Last Dance	Won (Note: Tied with Atlanta’s Missing and Murdered: The Lost Children)	
American Cinema Editors Awards	April 17, 2021	Best Edited Documentary (Non-Theatrical)	Chad Beck, Devin Concannon, Abhay Sofsky and Ben Sozanski (for "Episode 1")	Won	
Cinema Eye Honors	March 9, 2021	Outstanding Broadcast Series	The Last Dance	Nominated	
Cinema Eye Honors	March 9, 2021	Outstanding Editing in a Broadcast Film or Series	Chad Beck, Devin Concannon, Abhay Sofsky and Ben Sozanski	Nominated	
Creative Arts Emmy Awards	September 14, 2020	Outstanding Documentary or Nonfiction Series	Jason Hehir, Michael Tollin, Estee Portnoy, Curtis Polk, Connor Schell, Gregg Winik and Andrew Thompson	Won	
Creative Arts Emmy Awards	September 14, 2020	Outstanding Directing for a Documentary/Nonfiction Program	Jason Hehir (for "Episode 7")	Nominated	
Creative Arts Emmy Awards	September 14, 2020	Outstanding Picture Editing for a Nonfiction Program	Chad Beck, Devin Concannon, Abhay Sofsky and Ben Sozanski (for "Episode 1")	Nominated	
Golden Reel Awards	April 16, 2021	Outstanding Achievement in Sound Editing – Non-Theatrical Documentary	Keith Hodne (for "Episode 1")	Nominated	
NAACP Image Awards	March 22–27, 2021	Outstanding Documentary – Television	The Last Dance	Won	
Producers Guild of America Awards	March 24, 2021	Outstanding Producer of Non-Fiction Television	The Last Dance	Won	
TCA Awards	September 14, 2020	Outstanding Achievement in News and Information	The Last Dance	Won	

== See also ==
- Flu Game shoes
- Last Dance shoes
