= Flu Game shoes =

Shoes worn by Michael Jordan in 1997

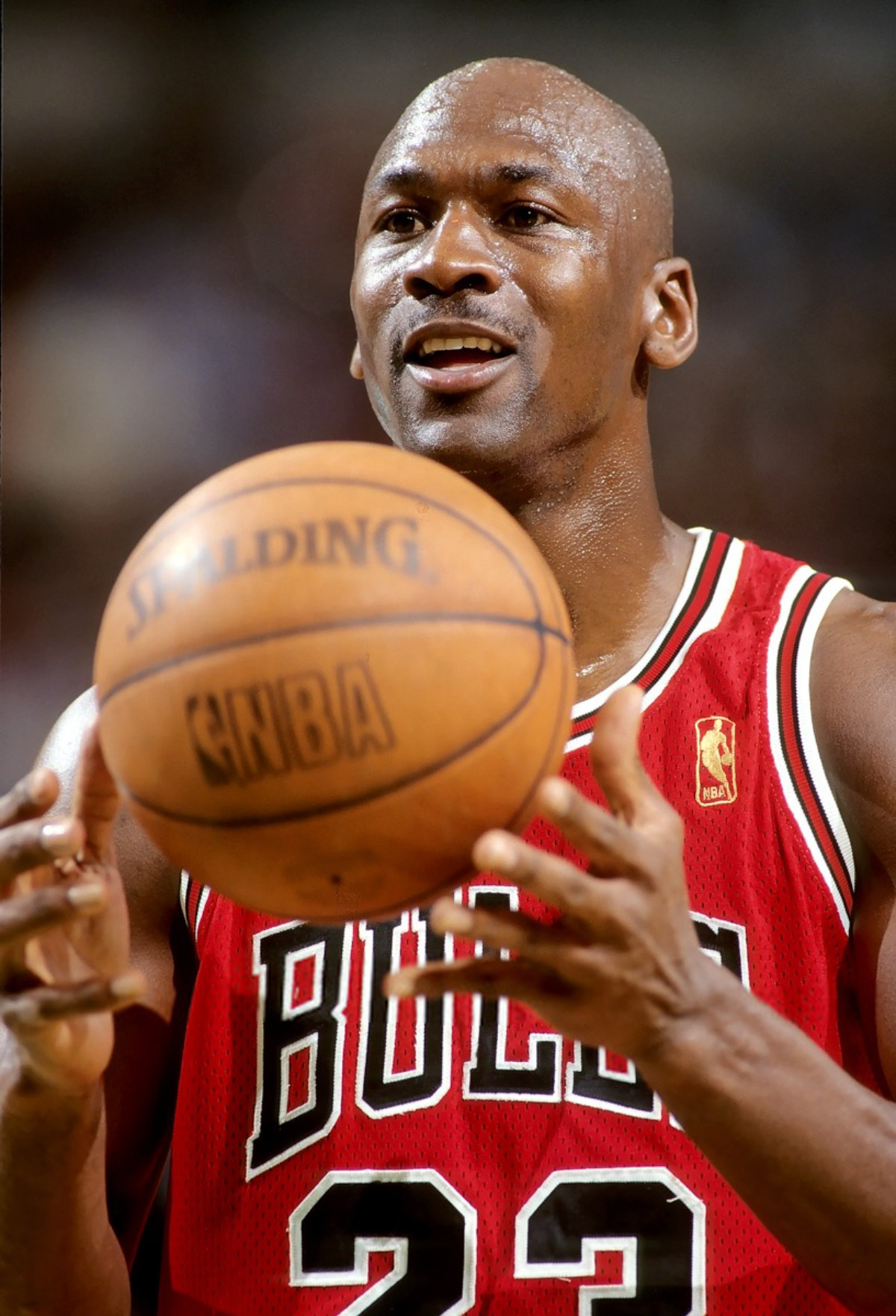
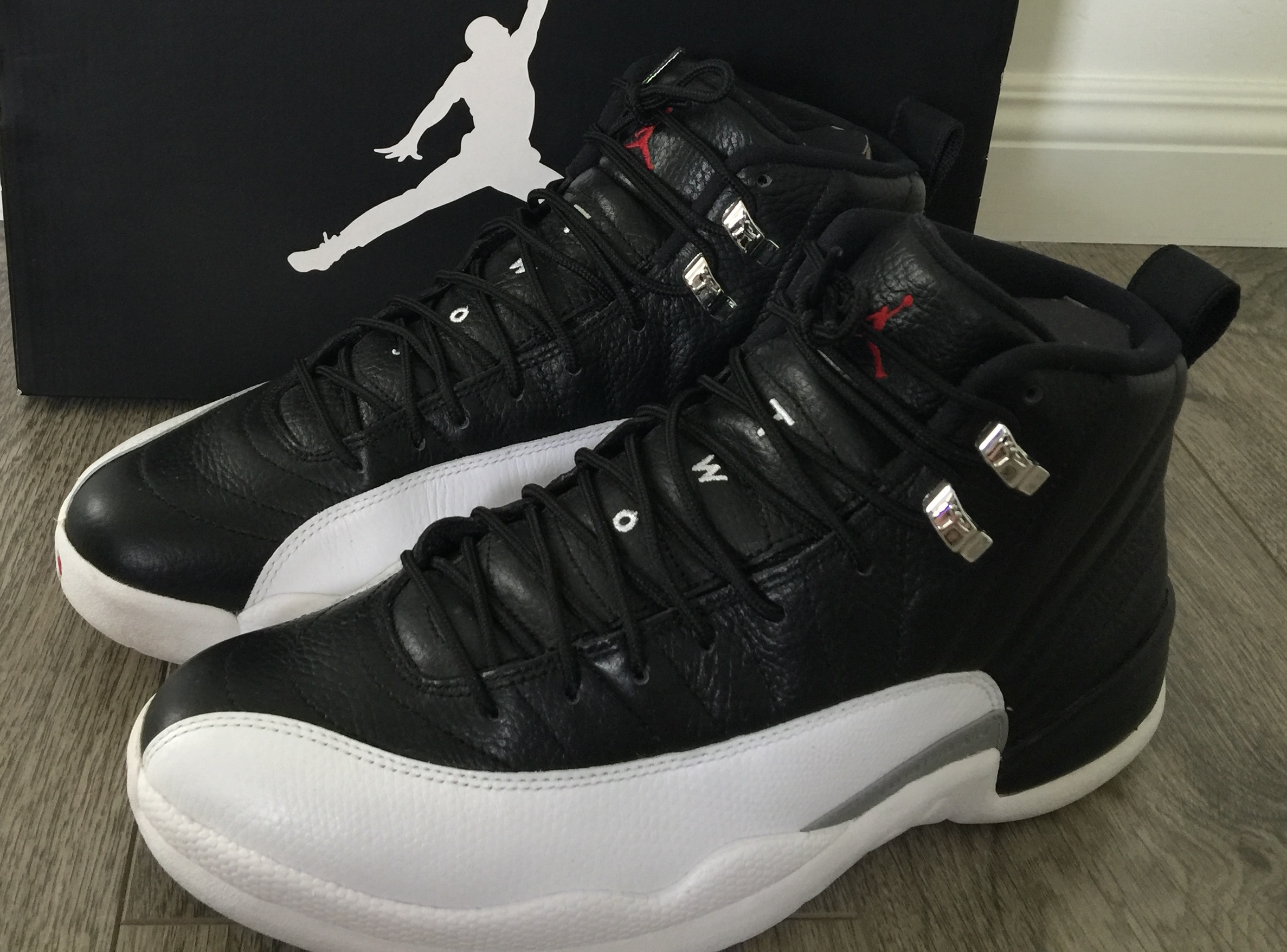
Michael Jordan in 1997, and a pair of Nike Air Jordan XII. The actual shoes are black and red.

The Flu Game shoes are black and red size 13 Nike Air Jordan XII worn by Michael Jordan in game five of the 1997 NBA Finals, commonly called The Flu Game. The game was between Michael Jordan's Chicago Bulls and the Utah Jazz. It was reported that Jordan had the flu before and during the game. Later, it was revealed that he was suffering from food poisoning.

Michael Jordan gave the shoes to a ball boy from the Utah Jazz after the game. The shoes were stored in a bank vault for 15 years and sold at auction for over US$104,000 in 2013. They were sold at auction a second time in June 2023 for US$1.38 million.

== Background ==
Before Game 5 of the 1997 NBA Finals Michael Jordan became ill. He participated in the game despite his illness, and the game became known as "The Flu Game". Jordan played 44 minutes in the game and finished with 38 points, 7 rebounds and 5 assists. With 25 seconds left, Jordan made a 3-point-game-winning basket. The Bulls went on to win the NBA Finals in game 6. The shoes that Jordan wore in game 5 became known as the "Flu Game shoes", though it was later revealed in The Last Dance that Jordan was suffering from food poisoning during the game.

The shoes are size 13 Nike Air Jordan XII in black and red.

== History of ownership ==
After the game, Michael Jordan gave the signed shoes to Utah Jazz's ball boy Preston Truman. The ball boy asked Jordan, "Are you doing anything with your shoes after the game?" Jordan asked, "Why, you want them?" Truman told Jordan he would be honored.

Truman held onto the shoes for fifteen years, keeping them in a Utah bank safe deposit box. He claims to have turned down an offer for US$11,000. In 2013, Truman offered the shoes for sale through Grey Flannel Auctions, and the bidding began at US$5,000 before realizing a sale price of US$104,765. The sale price of the shoes was a record price for game worn shoes at the time. On June 14, 2023, the shoes were auctioned for a second time, this time on the auction site Goldin. The bidding was started at US$500,000; after two weeks on the auction site, the price exceeded US$1,000,000. The shoes eventually realized a sale price of US$1.38 million. Another pair of Michael Jordan's game worn shoes, called the "Last Dance shoes", sold for US$2.238M. The shoes were also previously owned by Preston Truman.
