= Second Generation (advertisement) =

Television advertisement introducing Nike shoe

- The free throw line dunk at 0:35
- Agency: Wieden+Kennedy
- Client: Nike, Inc.
- Language: English
- Running time: 60 seconds
- Product: Air Jordan XXI
- Release date: February 2006
- Slogan: Let your game speak
- Directed by: Brian Beletic
- Music by: Jonathan Elias, David Wittman
- Starring: Michael Jordan
- Production company: Smuggler
- Country: United States

"Second Generation" (Note: The ad is also listed as "2nd Generation"; its tagline is "Let your game speak".) is a 2006 television advertisement introducing Nike's Air Jordan XXI brand of basketball shoes. The ad depicts signature moves from Michael Jordan's NBA career, recreated in the present day by twelve young basketball players around the world. Included are moments from the 1989, 1991, 1992, and 1998 NBA playoffs and the iconic 1988 slam dunk.

The ad was produced by Smuggler and directed by Brian Beletic for the advertising agency Wieden+Kennedy. Casting began in November 2005, filming took place in January 2006, and the ad debuted on television that February. Advertising publications gave favorable reviews to "Second Generation", although it did not win major awards.

== Production ==
The ad was conceived by the agency Wieden+Kennedy. Copywriters Derek Barnes and Paul Renner were in a shopping mall when they noticed many of the youths around them wearing Air Jordan shoes, despite Jordan having retired in 2003: "Just one look around the food court, you knew kids still waved his flag." The creative directors were Kevin Proudfoot and Todd Waterbury. Waterbury explained, "We thought of the fact that a version of him is alive in everyone that loves basketball. And there are moments in Jordan's career where you just say the move, or the game, and people who love the man, and love the sport, immediately can imagine that scene. Here, we were just taking advantage of those incredible moments."

Wieden+Kennedy hired Brian Beletic to direct the ad. W+K art director Jesse Coulter said of choosing Beletic, "He gets it. He brings the flavor." The music was composed by Jonathan Elias and David Wittman of Elias Arts.

Casting calls were held in three U.S. cities. A November 2005 ad put out by Ulysses Terrero and T&T Casting asked for "[BOYS] All ethnicities, ages 13-21, with amazing basketball skills – amazing enough to recreate some of Michael Jordan's greatest moments on the basketball court." Some 350 young basketball players auditioned over eight days; Beletic recalls the process as "an absurd amount of casting". The main challenge was in finding players who could match Jordan's jumping ability; the toughest shots were cast for older players. Casting was also complicated by the amateurism rules of the National Collegiate Athletic Association (NCAA): anyone who might play college basketball in the future couldn't appear in the ad.

Filming took place in Los Angeles in January 2006. The action is set in the present day, across the world; various scenes take place in Africa, China, Chicago, and New York City. Each scene is a few seconds long, depicting a young basketball player recreating a famous Jordan moment in slow motion. The actors were not shown footage of the moves they were performing; rather, their performances were based on their own memories. The staff then "fine-tuned" the scenes for accuracy.

== Sequence ==
The ad opens on a young man dribbling in place. The music starts with a simple ostinato C–G–B♭–C line played by a muted synth bass. At 0:05, a young man wags his tongue while dribbling. This is a signature move of Jordan's. At 0:09, a player drives to the basket with his tongue hanging out. He recreates a moment from the 1991 NBA Finals, game 2: Jordan scored a layup after switching hands in midair to avoid Sam Perkins of the Los Angeles Lakers.

The music starts growing in complexity, adding violins and a new bass line as a piano takes over the ostinato. At 0:13, the camera shows a young man chewing gum. At 0:15, a young man spreads his arms in a defensive stance. His jersey is colored red, yellow, and black to evoke Africa. At 0:21, an Asian boy palms the basketball. At 0:22, a young woman shoots a fall away jumper.

The music adds a second violin line and a snare drum cadence. At 0:25, a young man performs a "rock the cradle" slam dunk. At 0:29, a young man recreates Jordan's free throw line dunk from the 1988 NBA All-Star Game Slam Dunk Contest. This is the only shot where the original scenery is imitated. The set colors match the colors of the Chicago Stadium, and the crowd is spaced out in the same way as the crowd during Jordan's dunk; they nevertheless wear modern clothes, as the ad is set in the present. The intent is that by this point, the viewer is aware of the significance of each shot. Waterbury said, "We built the action in a way so that it created tension in the spot. As the commercial continues to build, the viewer will recognize scene after scene after scene."

At 0:35, the camera cuts to the aftermath of The Shot. A young man jumps in the air and pumps his fist as another young man in an opposing jersey sinks to the floor. The moment is from the 1989 NBA Playoffs, when Jordan hit a game-winning jump shot over Cleveland Cavaliers guard Craig Ehlo. At 0:38 is Jordan's last shot with the Chicago Bulls, after a crossover dribble past Utah Jazz guard Bryon Russell at the end of Game 6 of the 1998 NBA Finals. These scenes are musically punctuated with a bass drum roll and a cymbal crash. Finally, at 0:44 a young man shrugs after hitting a shot, as Jordan shrugged after scoring six three-point field goals in the first half of Game 1 of the 1992 NBA Finals against the Portland Trail Blazers.

The rhythm of the music pauses for two beats. It resumes at a calmer level as the camera shows Jordan in street clothes, watching from the sideline. Jordan is shown for just two seconds, smiling and nodding. Waterbury said of this shot, "We wanted to make sure that, through this commercial, people understood Michael's role as a mentor and a coach. His nod of approval at the end is his way of saying, 'Go.'" The camera cuts back to the young player; the tagline "LET YOUR GAME SPEAK" is shown, and the scene fades to black with the "XXI" logo and then the "Jumpman" logo.

== Reception ==
The ad received positive reviews from advertising publications. It listed by Adweek as the "Ad of the Day" and as one of the "Best Spots of February 2006". SHOOT named the ad their "Top Spot of the Week". ESPN's Darren Rovell wrote that "it deserves to be considered at the top of the list" of Jordan's more than 400 commercials. Creativity called the ad "impeccably executed", and Boards called it "so rich in detail that it entices in an instant". Second Generation did not win any major industry awards. Another Nike/W+K/Smuggler effort in August 2006, Pretty starring Maria Sharapova, would fare much better in that category.

On February 27, 2006, an anonymous Jordan fan uploaded a breakdown of the ad on YouTube, showing it side by side with the original footage. In an interview, Beletic commented on this video: "It is pretty awesome to watch."
