= Sir the Baptist =

- Also known as: Sir William James Baptist
- Born: James Haven Stovall
- Origin: Chicago, Illinois
- Genres: Hip hop; R&B; Pop; Gospel
- Years active: 2015–present
- Labels: Atlantic Records, Warner Music Group, Gaither Music Group, tymple
- Website: sirthebaptist.com

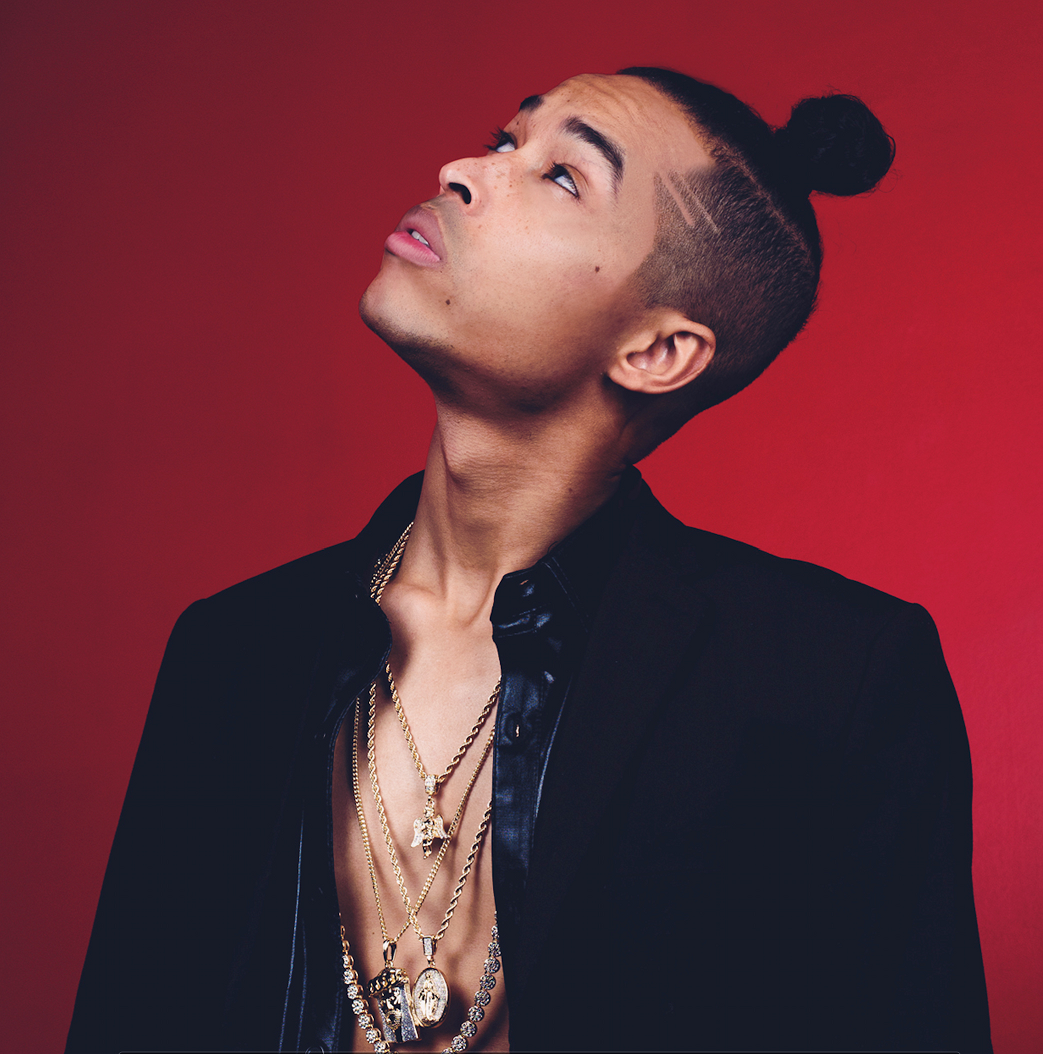
Sir The Baptist press photo from Atlantic Records, 2017

William James Stovall, better known by his stage name Sir the Baptist, is an American artist and songwriter. He has worked as producer and writer on two GRAMMY Award-winning albums, two GMA Dove Awards winners, two Stellar Awards winners a BMI Award as songwriter, and is BET Award-nominated artist.

== Early life and ancestry ==
Sir the Baptist was born James Haven Stovall and raised in the Bronzeville neighborhood on Chicago's South Side as the 20th child of the late family patriarch James Benton Stovall. His father was born in 1924 on the land his family farmed and owned slaves; he later became a traveling pastor and Christian apologist, during the Great Migration, founding the Bright Star Church of God in Christ in Chicago. His mother Patricia Ann Harris, is a transatlantic missionary from roots of Sierra Leone who served communities in 17 countries with Baptist as he toured America and Europe.

== Career ==
=== Stage name ===
His name, "Baptist" was adopted as a ceremonial name deriving from his father's occupation as a Baptist preacher. His name, Sir, was ascribed during his parochial school years at Leo Catholic High School. Sir practiced ritualistic baptisms at music festivals in America and at 22 shows across Europe.

Baptist worked as Director of Digital Marketing and Media for McDonald's campaigns at Leo Burnett Company, Inc. His work ranged from digital marketing, to writing music scores for a film that featured Meghan Markle, to jingles with Ira Antelis (Be Like Mike). After a dispute over the ownership to his publishing rights with the agency, he became homeless, and drove for Lyft until he signed a deal with Atlantic Records/Warner Music Group in New York City with Craig Kallman, Julie Greenwald and Michael Kyser.

Baptist's conversion to Christianity was due to a marijuana experience, and that his debut release Saint or Sinner was a blueprint to the urban Christian believers. He has toured Europe with Nelly, Mary J. Blige, and August Alsina.

=== Artist collaborations ===
Baptist has collaborated with musical artists Anthony Hamilton, Donald Lawrence, Kierra Sheard, Killer Mike, Twista, Michelle Williams, Tony Bennett, Pharrell Williams, Musiq Soulchild, Brandy Norwood, Estelle, Tori Kelly, Elle Varner, D.C. Young Fly.

=== Brand partnerships ===
Baptist has partnered with companies, agencies, and lifestyle brands Facebook, Apple, Google, Lexus, Glenfiddich, Samsung, McDonald's, W Hotels, Lyft, WeWork, Toyota, Tidal, Yeti, Converse, Vans, Macy's, The Chicago Bears, The Recording Academy, VH1 Save the Music Foundation, Fat Tire and Pandora.

== Discography ==
=== Singles ===
- Creflo Almighty Dollar (feat. Twista & ChurchPpl) – 2015
- Wake Up – 2015
- Raise Hell (feat. ChurchPpl) – 2015
- What We Got (feat. Donald Lawrence & ChurchPpl) – 2016
- Movin – 2017
- He Heard My Cry – 2018
- I Still Love You – 2019
- Me & God – 2019
- Bossa Nova – 2019
- Switched Partners – 2019
- Kingdom Come – 2019
- Can't Help Myself (feat. Saint Ashleey, Estelle, MC Lyte, Syleena Johnson, Ann Nesby, & Boys & Girls Clubs of the Gulf Coast) – 2020
- Scream & Shout – 2020
- Jesus In The Ghetto (feat. Anthony Hamilton) – 2021
- Adam & Eve'n (feat. Saint Ashleey) – 2021

=== Albums ===
- Saint or Sinner – 2017, Atlantic Records
- Godfidence: Kingdom Bae – 2020, tymple
- The Baptist – 2024, tymple

== Awards ==
Year	Award	Category	Nominee	Result
2016	BET Hip Hop Awards	Impact Track of the Year	"Raise Hell"	Nominated
2019	GMA Dove Awards	Traditional Gospel Recorded Song of the Year	"Deliver Me "	Winner
2019	GMA Dove Awards	Traditional Gospel Album of the Year	"Goshen"	Winner
2020	GRAMMY Awards	Best Gospel Album	"Goshen"	Nominated
2020	Stellar Awards	Song of the Year	"Deliver Me (This Is My Exodus)"	Winner
2020	Stellar Awards	Producer of the Year	"Goshen"	Nominated
2020	Stellar Awards	Urban/Inspirational Single of Performance of the Year	"Deliver Me (This Is My Exodus)"	Winner
2021	GRAMMY Awards	Best Gospel Album	Kierra	Nominated
2021	GMA Dove Awards	Contemporary Gospel Album of the Year	Kierra	Nominated
2021	NAACP Image Awards	Outstanding Gospel/Christian Album	Kierra	Nominated
2021	GMA Dove Awards	Contemporary Album of the Year	Kierra	Winner
2021	BMI Trailblazers of Gospel Awards	Song of the Year	"Deliver Me (This Is My Exodus)"	Winner
2023	GRAMMY Awards	Best Roots Gospel Album	The Urban Hymnal	Winner
2023	GRAMMY Awards	Best Spoken Word Poetry Album	The Poet Who Sat By The Door	Winner
2025	GRAMMY Awards	Best Gospel Performance/Song	"Church Doors"	Nominated

== Political views ==
Baptist supported Hillary Clinton in the 2016 United States presidential election. In August 2016, Baptist taunted a Donald Trump impersonator on stage for his Afropunk Festival performance in Brooklyn. He has also been quoted saying that Donald Trump is "way out of touch" with the African American community. Baptist has partnered with the Boys and Girls Clubs of America, VH1 Save the Music, and Global Citizen.
