= Be Like Mike =

1991 Gatorade commercial featuring Michael Jordan

- A frame from Be Like Mike, depicting Michael Jordan playing basketball with a child.
- Agency: Bayer Bess Vanderwarker
- Client: Quaker
- Language: English
- Media: Television
- Running time: 60 seconds
- Product: Gatorade
- Release date: August 8, 1991
- Slogan: Be Like Mike. Drink Gatorade.
- Music by: Ira Antelis, Steve Shafer
- Starring: Michael Jordan
- Country: United States

Be Like Mike is a television advertisement for Gatorade starring American professional basketball player Michael Jordan. Created by advertising agency Bayer Bess Vanderwarker, it features various children and adults playing basketball with Jordan, set to a song with lyrics about wishing one could be like the basketball player.

As the first Gatorade commercial to feature Jordan, the concept for Be Like Mike originated from advertisement executive Bernie Pitzel. Pitzel was inspired by the song "I Wanna Be Like You" from the Disney film The Jungle Book, but failed to secure the rights to use it. Instead, he wrote lyrics and hired Ira Antelis and Steve Shafer to compose the song that would become the background music for the advertisement.

Originally broadcast on August 8, 1991, the commercial was warmly received by the public. While the advertisement did not drastically improve sales for Gatorade, it helped to further portray Jordan as a likable superstar, endearing him to children who wished to emulate his play. In subsequent years, the advertisement has been cited as one of the best sports commercials ever.

== Sequence ==
The commercial begins with footage of Jordan during Game 2 of the 1991 NBA Finals against the Los Angeles Lakers, where he performs a difficult layup by moving the basketball from his right hand to his left while in midair. Following another NBA highlight featuring one of Jordan's slam dunks, the commercial cuts to a black child attempting a dunk with his tongue out like Jordan. Subsequent cuts feature children of various ages and ethnicities trying to imitate his moves from NBA footage shown earlier. We also see video clips of Jordan having fun while playing basketball with the children outside.

To contrast, the ad also contains various clips of Jordan playing basketball in an indoor gymnasium with men. He is also shown smiling and laughing while drinking Gatorade with them. While Jordan is shown playing basketball seriously, the commercial also contains a shot of him laughing as he loses control of the basketball.

Throughout the commercial, an upbeat pop song described as "world music" plays, with both adults and children singing lyrics about them wishing that they could play basketball like Jordan:

Sometimes I dream
That he is me
You've got to see that's how I dream to be
I dream I move, I dream I groove
Like Mike
If I could be like Mike

Near the end of the advertisement, footage is shown of The Shot, a famous basketball play in which Jordan makes a buzzer beater shot over Craig Ehlo to defeat the Cleveland Cavaliers in the playoffs. The commercial ends with a shot of Jordan, smiling with a cup of Gatorade, as he turns away from the camera. It then transitions to a black background, with the slogan "Be like Mike. Drink Gatorade." written in all caps white text.

== Production ==
=== Background ===
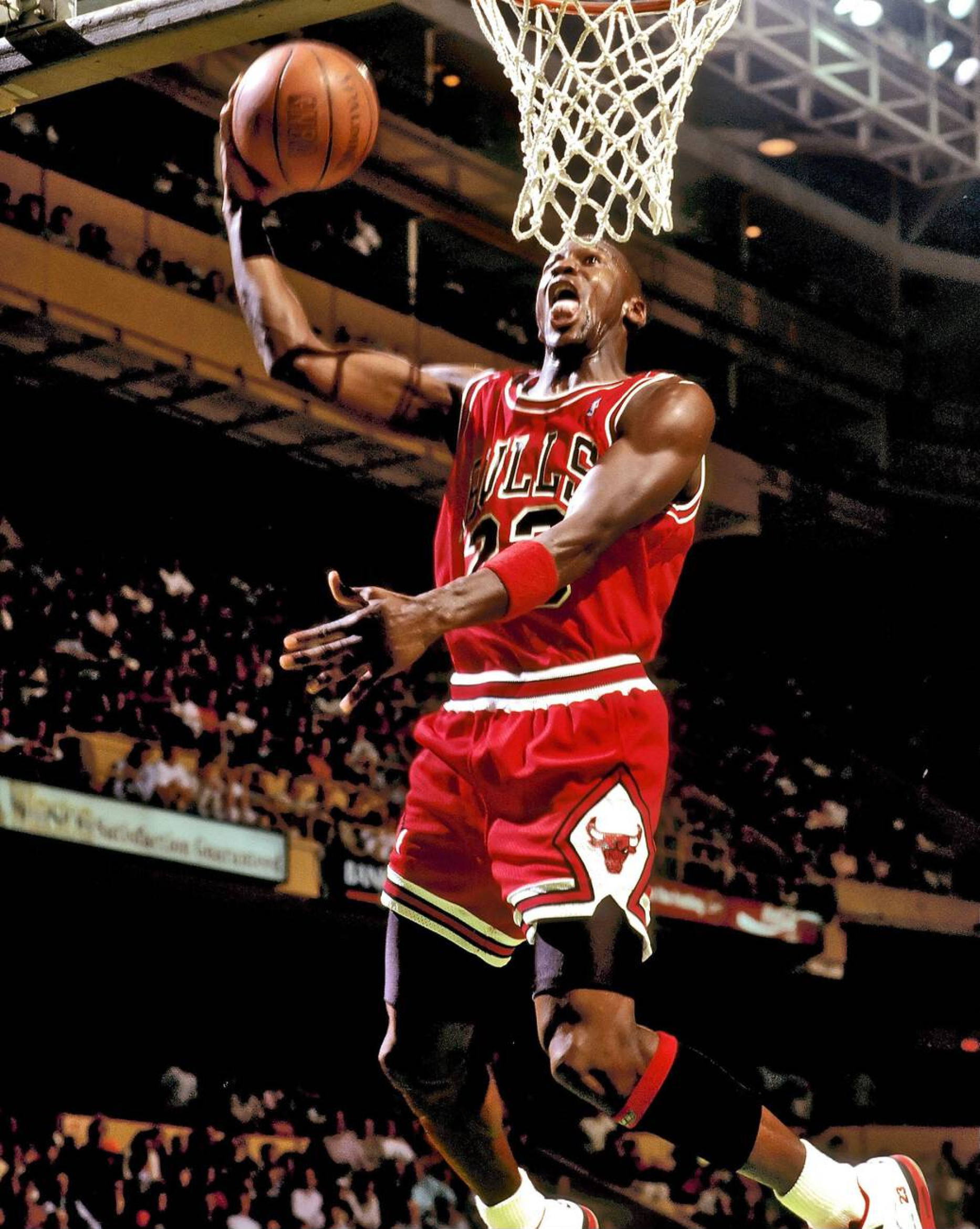
Michael Jordan in 1987

Be Like Mike was created by advertising agency Bayer Bess Vanderwarker, which had been doing advertisements for Gatorade since 1983. After being purchased by the Quaker Oats Company in its acquisition of Stokely-Van Camp that same year, Quaker slowly grew Gatorade from a regional drink brand into a national powerhouse. Seeing an opportunity to market Gatorade to the general public, they ran daytime television and print advertisements outside of sports-related media to great success. In its first eleven months under Quaker, Gatorade sales jumped from $83 million to $120 million. By 1989, Gatorade was making $450 million in annual sales out of the $475 million comprising the sports drink market at the time. As competitors like Powerade and Mountain Dew Sport began to appear on shelves, Quaker introduced more varieties like Gatorade Light and Free Style to attract people interested in lighter versions of their beverage. It also began to increase their budget for marketing, spending around $30 million by 1990.

One of the marketing campaigns that Quaker used to propel sales during this period of growth was their "Thirst Aid" television campaign. The campaign was used from 1984 to 1990, and consisted of a jingle written by songwriter Joe Lubinsky that stated, "Gatorade is thirst aid, for that deep down body thirst." However, in December 1990, federal judge Prentice Marshall ruled that Quaker had infringed on a trademark for "Thirst Aid" held by Sands, Taylor & Wood, which had acquired the trademark in 1973. Marshall forced Quaker to pay Sands, Taylor & Wood $24.7 million in damages on top of legal fees and interest, and Quaker lost the ability to use the trademark in its advertising.

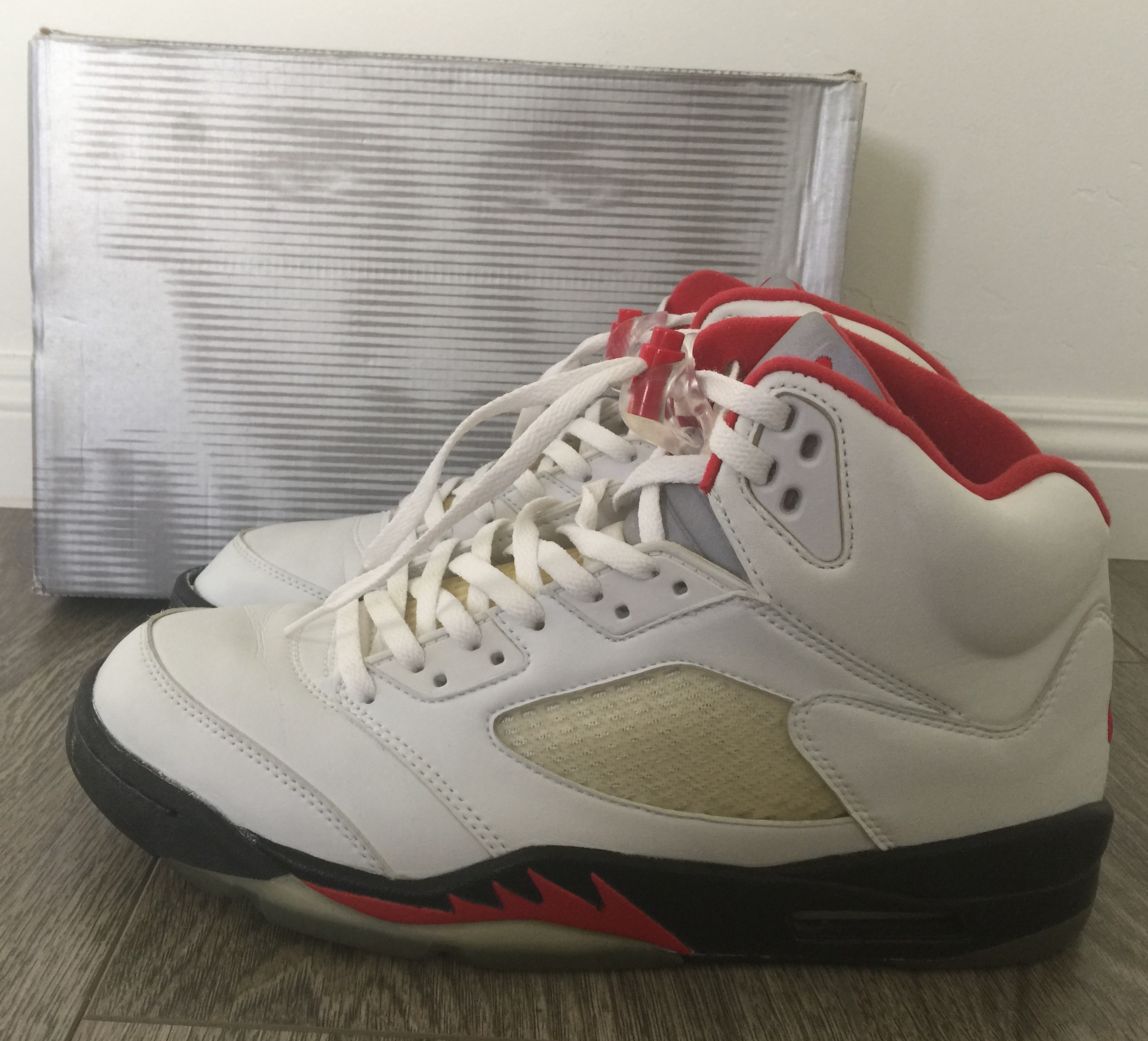
Jordan had several other sponsorship deals with companies like Nike, which had released the Air Jordan V in 1990.

With new competitors wanting Gatorade's market share, and a higher marketing budget – yet being unable to reuse their previous work – Quaker needed a new advertising campaign. They were interested in the emerging trend of using athletes to market their product: between 1983 and 1987, athlete endorsement earnings quadrupled to $500 million per year. However, this was new territory for Quaker. The company had not included an athlete spokesperson in their American Gatorade promotions before, and had only used tennis players Jennifer Capriati and Ivan Lendl to market the drink overseas.

Bill Schmidt, a Gatorade sports marketing director, was interested in enlisting Jordan to be a spokesperson for their brand. The basketball player won his second Most Valuable Player award for the 1990–91 NBA season, and would go on to help the Chicago Bulls win their first championship in June 1991. Jordan also had many sponsorship deals with other companies like Nike, General Mills, and McDonald's, making him an attractive prospect for Gatorade. Quaker had previously made an attempt to convince Jordan to be their Gatorade spokesperson in 1985, but did not have the budget to do so at the time. He ended up signing an agreement to represent Coca-Cola the same year.

In February 1991 however, Schmidt met with Jordan's agent, David Falk, in Charlotte to discuss the possibility of a sponsorship deal. After negotiations, they were able to agree on a 10-year, $13.5 million Gatorade sponsorship for Jordan, who was under contract with Coca-Cola until July 31 of that year. Executives at the Chicago-based Quaker were happy that they were able to sponsor a star athlete who played for the same city. However, there were worries about whether the company was straying from their team-oriented values by signing an individual athlete to a sponsorship deal. Gatorade executive Cindy Alston recalled, "I think a lot of people were saying, 'We love Michael Jordan at a Chicago-based company,' but there was a lot of angst about getting it right."

=== Conception and production ===
For Jordan's first Gatorade commercial, Bayer Bess Vanderwarker produced a draft version featuring highlights of him dunking. Midway through production, and after the draft had been approved, the ad agency convinced one of its former advertising executives, Bernie Pitzel, to come back and work on the project. However, Pitzel was disappointed with the commercial after watching it, as he felt it too closely resembled Jordan's advertisements for Nike.

Given three days to produce an alternative, Pitzel came up with an idea to use the song "I Wanna Be Like You" from the 1967 film The Jungle Book. He pitched the song with revised lyrics and an arrangement by Chicago musician Cliff Coleman. However, discussions with Disney to license the song broke down after Disney asked for more money than Gatorade was willing to pay. According to Pitzel, Disney wanted $350,000 for Gatorade to be able to use the song commercially for five weeks, and additionally requested that the lyrics could not be changed to include the phrase "be like Mike". Faced with a looming deadline, Pitzel sat down at a restaurant and wrote the lyrics to Be Like Mike in four hours. He then faxed the lyrics to four different music companies, ultimately deciding on songwriters Ira Antelis and Steve Shafer to create the music. Antelis recalled composing the melody in about fifteen minutes, stating, "I thought I would make more of a song out of it, take the 'Be Like Mike' and really make it the chorus." With the help of music producer Bonny Dolan, the songwriters got eight singers to sing on the recording presented to Gatorade executives at the American Club in Kohler, Wisconsin. The executives liked the commercial and approved it, though they had some concerns over whether Jordan would be comfortable with being called "Mike" instead of "Michael". The basketball player ultimately did not mind, saying, "You can call me Mike, Michael or Air. I'll get used to it."

With the concept approved, Pitzel arranged for several extras to be filmed playing basketball with Jordan on a local basketball court. Many of these extras, including Pitzel's own son Nathan, were the children of Quaker executives. The commercial was shot in various locations throughout Chicago, including Cabrini–Green, Lincoln Park, and North Avenue Beach.

== Release ==
Be Like Mike was aired on August 8, 1991, after Gatorade announced their sponsorship with Jordan during a press conference on the same date. It was released alongside an eight-page foldout print advertisement in the August 12th issue of Sports Illustrated. The television commercial also began appearing in movie theaters the following week. Seeing the commercial's popularity, Gatorade released the song in November 1991 on A&M Records as a single on cassette tape for $4.95. The cassette contains three versions of the song: the original track from the commercial, an R&B version, and a "Bonus Beat Mix". Both new versions feature a rap verse by Jay Johnson. The single sold 100,000 copies, with its proceeds donated to the Michael Jordan Foundation.

The following year, Gatorade expanded Be Like Mike into a multimedia campaign, including updated packaging with different images of Jordan on each of its flavors. The company also offered a sweepstakes of the same name to promote the 1992 Summer Olympics. Following Jordan's 1993 retirement from the NBA and subsequent signing to Minor League Baseball, Gatorade chose to move away from using the jingle for American commercials. Schmidt confirmed the following year that the company would restructure their marketing around Jordan's new occupation, stating, "People in the U.S. realize that Michael has retired. Our U.S. ads have to reflect what Michael is doing now."

== Public reception ==
Be Like Mike became popular amongst the general public. By including scenes of him playing basketball with children who copy his moves, Quaker was able to portray Jordan as an endearing, "down-to-earth basketball megastar" who children want to emulate. Calling him by the shortened name "Mike" added to the "everyman" quality of this persona. Using Jordan's star power, the ad implied that if people wanted to gain his abilities and success in sports, they would need to drink Gatorade. Reflecting on Jordan's ability to transcend racial divides through his commercials, journalist Touré commented, "The moment where you have a Michael Jordan ad where lots of little white kids are saying, 'I want to be like Mike.' That is an extraordinary, watershed moment. I don't think that was happening before."

Quaker had hoped that their commercial would help sell more of the drink; chief executive officer William Smithburg had declared, "Michael is perfect to represent Gatorade. His positive international image will help Gatorade further build its market." However, while Be Like Mike was effective at convincing fans of Jordan to try Gatorade, it did not particularly translate to increased profits. Quaker executives reasoned that the commercial did not convey the efficacy of the drink to his fans, and as a result changed their commercials to feature clips of Jordan sweating, to greater success. However, by signing Jordan to a sponsorship deal in the first place, Quaker was able to prevent him from re-signing with Coca-Cola and potentially endorsing Gatorade's rival product, Powerade.

== Legacy ==
"Be Like Mike" is cited as one of the most memorable advertisements in sports marketing. In a retrospective, ESPN.com described the advertisement as "one of the most famous commercials of all time". In an earlier article from 2003, they rated it as the greatest commercial starring Jordan, stating that "millions of people still have the 'Be Like Mike' jingle stuck in their head so many years later." Be Like Mike also placed first in both The Washington Post's ranking of Jordan's top 23 commercials, as well as the list of greatest sports commercials ranked by USA Today subsidiary, For The Win. The Athletic also highlighted the ad as one of the best NBA commercials. When asked, Pitzel was grateful that the negotiations with Disney were unsuccessful, stating, "If we had used music from The Jungle Book, the advertisement would have been forgotten."

A new version of Be Like Mike returned for the 1998 NBA All-Star Game in February of that year. Created by FCB, the new commercial featured celebrities singing along to the lyrics. Soccer player Mia Hamm, WNBA player Sheryl Swoopes, and sportscasters Chris Berman and Ahmad Rashad take part in singing, along with music artists John Popper and Take 6. Marvin the Martian, Bugs Bunny and Larry Bird (who had an intense rivalry with Jordan) also make appearances, with the latter speaking, "I'm not gonna sing."

As part of its 50th anniversary celebrations in 2015, Gatorade re-aired a digitally remastered version of the commercial during NBA All-Star Weekend. The updated version ends by displaying the hashtag #BeLikeMike. They later released three new commercials based on the original. For the 25th anniversary of the commercial's release in 2017, Gatorade and Air Jordan collaborated to release the "Be Like Mike" collection. This collection included shoes, clothes, and accessories that featured Gatorade branding. The two companies worked with Foot Locker to create an advertising campaign called "Bold Like Kawhi" for the 2017 holiday season, in which basketball player Kawhi Leonard performs various activities after being gifted a pair of Air Jordan basketball shoes in a Gatorade colorway. In a press release, Leonard stated that "being part of a holiday campaign that pays homage to the original 'Be Like Mike' Gatorade ad is really special."

In 2020, during the airing of the documentary miniseries The Last Dance on ESPN about the 1997–98 Chicago Bulls season, Gatorade aired an updated version of the commercial featuring many of the same highlights but interspersed with videos of modern basketball players Zion Williamson, Elena Delle Donne and Jayson Tatum.

== See also ==
- "Hey Kid, Catch!", Coca-Cola advertisement featuring football player "Mean" Joe Greene
