= Nike Air Monarch =

Line of shoes by Nike

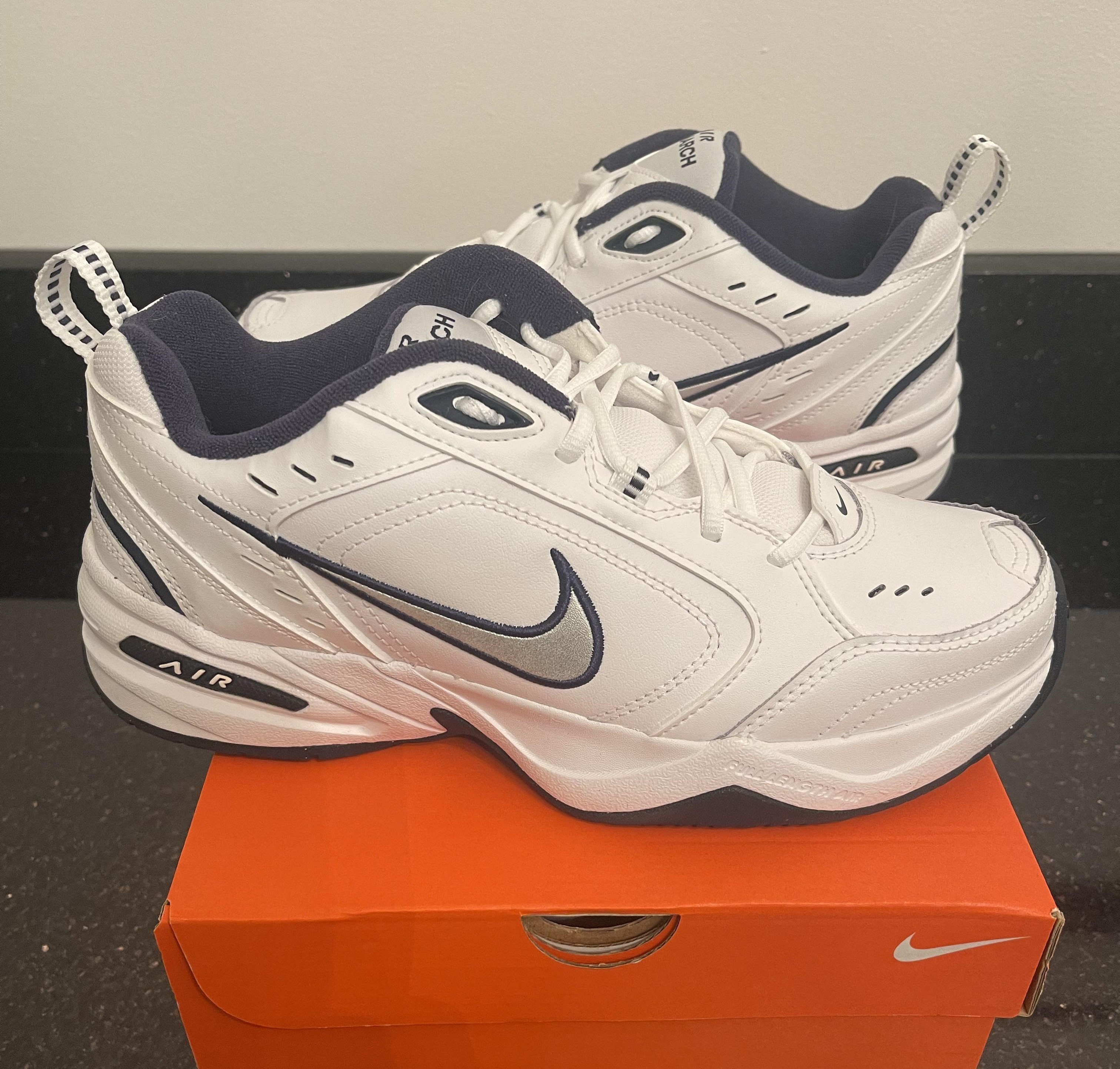
- A pair of Air Monarch IV sneakers
- Type: Sneakers
- Inventor: Nike
- Manufacturer: Nike
- Available: Yes

Nike Air Monarch is a series of shoes made by Nike, Inc. designed to be worn for everyday use. The popularity of the shoe among older dads has led to the shoe being known as the "dad shoe".

== Overview ==
The company saw that it was losing market share with older male consumers to other companies and wanted to release a new shoe that would appeal to this demographic. The idea for the design was to create something that was seen as vital to everyday life like food. Many of the designers at Nike went to theme parks to watch the men in what they did as well as ask for their input on the design. The popularity of the shoe among older dads has led to the shoe being known as the "dad shoe".

== Models ==
=== Air Monarch I ===
The first model featured a leather upper with a chunky design to offer comfort along with a lot of cushioning inside the shoe and tongue.

=== Air Monarch II ===
The second iteration of the shoe was designed by Jason Mayden who would later become the director for the Air Jordan brand. He decided to keep the overall same design and only make small changes. Changes made to the shoe included the internal construction, added traction patterns and a pivot point in the outsole for rotation, and textures in areas that wrinkled in the previous version. The shoe also had its own unique version of the Swoosh logo.

=== Air Monarch III ===
The third model was released in 2005. It featured full length Nike Air in the outsole as well as added herringbone traction.

=== Air Monarch IV ===
Released in 2009, the shoe featured changes to the design to make it look faster and added perforations.
