= Jerry Krause =

American sports executive (1939–2017)

- Krause at the 2001 NBA Draft

Personal information
- Born: April 6, 1939 Chicago, Illinois, U.S.
- Died: March 21, 2017 (aged 77) Chicago, Illinois, U.S.

Career information
- High school: Taft (Chicago, Illinois)
- College: Bradley

Career highlights
- As executive: 6× NBA champion (1991–1993, 1996–1998); 2× NBA Executive of the Year (1988, 1996)
- Basketball Hall of Fame

Jerome Richard Krause (April 6, 1939 – March 21, 2017) was an American sports scout and executive who was the general manager of the Chicago Bulls in the National Basketball Association (NBA) from 1985 to 2003.

His tenure with the Bulls included their six NBA championships between 1991 and 1998, led by superstar players Michael Jordan and Scottie Pippen. Krause received the NBA Executive of the Year Award in 1988 and 1996. He was posthumously inducted into the Basketball Hall of Fame in 2017. His career in sports included positions as a scout or general manager for the Baltimore Bullets, Chicago White Sox, and the Chicago Bulls.

== Early life ==
Krause was born in 1939 to a Jewish family and grew up in Chicago. His parents operated a deli and then a shoe store. Krause played high school baseball as a catcher at Taft High School in Chicago and attended Bradley University.

Krause began evaluating basketball and baseball talent as a high school student. He worked as a copy boy in the sports department of the Chicago American during his teenage years. Krause was obsessed with sports and was nicknamed "J. G. Taylor Krause" after J. G. Taylor Spink, the editor of The Sporting News. He had wanted to become a sportswriter when he was young but realised he was "just a hack" at writing and instead possessed a talent for scouting. Krause turned down a staff position at the Chicago American so he could become a scout.

== Early career ==
After college, Krause worked as a go-fer for Philip K. Wrigley, the owner of the Chicago Cubs. He then worked as a scout and in public relations for the Baltimore Bullets. Early on, Krause gained a reputation of being able to spot talent. He advocated for the Bullets to draft Jerry Sloan and Earl Monroe.

While with the Bullets, Krause urged the team to pick North Dakota forward Phil Jackson in the 1967 NBA draft. The Bullets did not draft him, but Krause continued to keep in touch during Jackson's playing career and into his first years as a coach. Their relationship flourished during the 1970s and 1980s. While Jackson was coaching the Albany Patroons in the Continental Basketball Association, Krause once called him to ask for an analysis of the league's players, which Jackson provided in detail.

Krause was a scout for the Chicago Bulls from their inaugural season in 1966 until 1971 when he had conflicts with head coach Dick Motta. He also scouted for the Phoenix Suns, Philadelphia 76ers and Los Angeles Lakers.

On June 1, 1976, Krause was hired as the director of player personnel for the Bulls. One week into his role, he allegedly offered Ray Meyer the position of head coach but then denied it. The job instead went to Ed Badger who was not Krause's choice to fill the vacancy. Krause wanted to select Robert Parish in the 1976 NBA draft but Bulls owner Arthur Wirtz refused to negotiate with Parish's agent and instead drafted Scott May. On August 31, Krause resigned after three months in the role over apparent policy disagreements with Badger.

Krause also worked as a baseball scout. He worked in the 1970s for the Cleveland Indians, Oakland Athletics, Seattle Mariners, and Chicago White Sox. He once worked as the general manager of a farm team for the Indians. While working for the Mariners, Krause continued to scout part-time for the Lakers. As a White Sox scout, he played a role in the signing of Ozzie Guillén and Kenny Williams, who would lead the White Sox to a World Series championship in 2005 as manager and general manager, respectively. He scouted for the White Sox until 1984.

== Chicago Bulls GM ==
On March 26, 1985, Krause was hired by Jerry Reinsdorf as the vice president of basketball operations for the Bulls.

=== Coaching staff ===
Krause's first hire with the Bulls was longtime personal friend Tex Winter. Krause hired Winter as an assistant bench coach. Krause urged Winter to teach all of the Bulls players, especially Michael Jordan, the Triangle Offense. Winter had learned the triangle offense as a college player at USC under then head coach Sam Barry, and later used it to successfully guide Kansas State to a number one ranking. At the end of the 1988-1989 NBA season, Krause fired then-head coach Doug Collins and replaced him with assistant coach Phil Jackson. Even though Collins had guided the Bulls to the Eastern Conference Finals, this was largely because Collins would not let Winter do as Krause had instructed. Jackson managed to convince Jordan to give up the individual scoring plays that had become his trademark and try Winter’s system, where all five players on the floor were threats to score.

Krause made strength coach Al Vermeil one of his first hires, and the Bulls became one of the first NBA teams to embrace weight training for players. Krause gave scouting and management opportunities to African-Americans when this was not the norm. Karen Stack Umlauf, originally hired as a secretary for Krause, was soon writing scouting reports on potential draftees and working out players were signed for the Bulls, and eventually promoted to director of basketball operations, making her one of the few women to be deeply involved in basketball-centric duties.

=== Building the 1991–93 roster ===
At the time Krause took over as general manager, he already had on the team Michael Jordan and John Paxson — two of the five players who would become key parts of the team that would win three consecutive championships from 1991 to 1993. Krause made a number of moves that began building the foundation for future success. He turned over the Bulls roster and built up a collection of draft picks, although the moves in 1985 and 1986 were not particularly noteworthy. Krause planned to select tall forward Brad Sellers in the 1986 NBA draft. Sellers, Krause reasoned, handled the ball very well for a big man, and also had a solid outside jumper. Jordan, on the other hand, pushed management to take Johnny Dawkins, a two-way guard from Duke. It looked as though Krause would take Dawkins even as late as the morning of the draft; the coaches and players had made it clear that they wanted him and not Sellers, and Krause did not particularly have a problem with Dawkins' game. The Bulls' head coach at the time, Doug Collins, even told Duke coach Mike Krzyzewski the night before the draft that the team would pick Dawkins. However, Krause picked Sellers anyway, and spent the summer trying to sell him to Jordan. Jordan went after Sellers mercilessly in practice, and Sellers was traded after three seasons.

It was in the 1987 NBA draft that Krause drafted power forward Horace Grant and traded draft pick Olden Polynice, a center, for Seattle's 1st Round draft pick — Scottie Pippen, a small forward. The two were, along with Jordan, cornerstones of the Bulls' 1991–1993 championship teams. The 1988 draft failed to yield much, as first-round pick Will Perdue failed to develop as hoped.

In 1988, Krause traded power forward Charles Oakley to the New York Knicks for center Bill Cartwright. Jordan initially despised the trade, as Oakley was Jordan's best friend on the team, and as Jordan and Oakley learned of the trade while they were on their way to Las Vegas to see a Mike Tyson fight. Cartwright turned out to be everything the Bulls needed, however, providing a presence in the middle for all three Bulls championships from 1991 to 1993. Perhaps most importantly, Cartwright proved to be the league's best center at defending Patrick Ewing, the key player on the New York Knicks who were the Bulls' most important early-1990s conference rival. Jordan later acknowledged that Krause had made the correct move in trading Oakley for Cartwright. Krause, one of the few members of the Bulls organization to say "no" to Jordan, also clashed with Jordan repeatedly (notably in 1986 over calling Jordan "property" in limiting playing minutes after return from an injury), such that Jordan allegedly referred to Krause as "Crumbs" in mocking Krause’s physical appearance and his seeming need to be one of the guys on the team bus. While Jordan was the public face of the NBA as its superstar, Krause was fiercely secretive and non-communicative with the local media.

By 1988, the Bulls had assembled their starting five players (guards Jordan and Paxson, forwards Pippen and Grant, and center Cartwright) for the team that would reach five consecutive Eastern Conference finals from 1989 to 1993 and win three consecutive NBA championships from 1991 to 1993. Krause was named NBA Executive of the Year in 1988. In 1989 and 1990, Krause added depth to the roster. The Bulls picked Stacey King and B. J. Armstrong in the 1989 NBA draft and later signed undrafted big man Scott Williams. Krause nonetheless was disliked by the entire Bulls locker room, while Jackson was enormously popular, such as Krause believed that Jackson took too much credit for the Bulls dynasty.

=== Building the 1996–98 roster ===
The first retirement of Jordan, following the 1993 NBA season, brought massive change to the Chicago Bulls roster. The 1993–94 Bulls were composed entirely of Krause's acquisitions, including several minimum salary players. Just before Jordan announced his retirement, Krause persuaded 1990 draft pick Toni Kukoč to buy himself out of his European contract and join the Bulls. Despite losing Jordan, the Bulls won 55 games during the season, just two less than the season before. In the playoffs, the Bulls lost to the heavily favored New York Knicks in seven games in the second round.

During the 1993–94 NBA season, Stacey King was traded to the Minnesota Timberwolves in exchange for 7'2" center Luc Longley. Longley's emergence for the Bulls during the 1994–95 season made Will Perdue expendable. Just before the start of the 1995–96 season, Perdue was traded to the San Antonio Spurs for Dennis Rodman.

After Jordan returned to the NBA, the Bulls won a then-NBA record 72 games in the 1995–1996 season, and Krause was named Executive of the Year for the second time. The next year, they tied the then second best-ever NBA record with 69 wins and repeated as champions.

=== 1997–98 season ===
Krause and head coach Phil Jackson had been friends for years, but their relationship was, in Jackson's opinion, shattered early in the 1990s after Chicago Tribune reporter Sam Smith (whom Krause despised) published a book on the 1991 title team, The Jordan Rules. The book detailed the tension that already existed between Krause and the players, and ultimately drove a wedge between Krause and Jackson. Regardless of the success Jackson had as head coach of the Bulls, the tension between Jackson and Krause grew in the succeeding years, and by the 1997–98 season, was especially high, illustrated by several incidents. During the summer of 1997, Krause's stepdaughter married. All of the Bulls assistant coaches and their wives were invited to the wedding, as was Tim Floyd, then the head coach at Iowa State, whom Krause was openly courting as Jackson's successor (and who would eventually succeed Jackson). Jackson and his then wife, June, were not even told of the wedding, much less invited, only finding out about the event when the wife of Cartwright, who by that time had become a Bulls assistant, asked June what she would be wearing to the reception.

After contentious negotiations between Jackson and the Bulls in that same period, Jackson was signed for the 1997–98 season only. Krause announced the signing in what Chicago media widely considered to be a mean-spirited manner, emphasizing that Jackson would not be rehired even if the Bulls won the 1997–98 title. That triggered an argument between Jackson and Krause in which Jackson essentially told Krause that he seemed to be rooting for the other side and not the Bulls. At that point, Krause told Jackson, "I don't care if it's 82-and-0 this year, you're fucking gone." Krause was widely quoted as saying, "Players and coaches don't win championships; organizations win championships." The statement particularly offended Michael Jordan. However, Krause said that his original phrasing was "Players and coaches alone don't win championships; organizations win championships."

Although most of the narrative suggested that Jackson was forced out as head coach, Jackson had actually declined a long-term offer from owner Jerry Reinsdorf in 1998. Jackson himself held to a theory that "a coach loses the attention of his players after seven years", being taught by his father Charles, a traveling Pentecostal minister that, "You can only stay in one place five years and then your message starts falling on deaf ears." During Jackson's sixth season as head coach, he told Krause and Reinsdorf that he would only return after his contract expired in 1996 if the team cut loose every player from the first three-peat, including Pippen. Though Jordan did return to basketball after major-league baseball was halted by a strike, only he (having confided to Reinsdorf that he would only play for Jackson) and Pippen remained for the second string of championships. Jordan retired after the 1997-98 season because he was "burned out" shouldering an increasing burden for the team due to Pippen's absence and "babying Rodman". Reinsdorf, while offering Jackson the opportunity to return the following year as head coach, made it clear that the team would have to go into a rebuild because other than Jordan the rest of the players were at the end of the productive years and they would be too expensive to re-sign. Jackson refused by saying that he didn't want to coach a bad team and left after his contact expired, initially vowing never to coach again, but after he took a year off he decided to give it another chance with the Los Angeles Lakers. Longtime friend of Krause and Bulls assistant coach Tex Winter, who was the architect of the triangle offense, stayed with the Bulls for another full season, leaving the organization in the summer of 1999, when Phil Jackson was hired to coach the Lakers. Krause said that he had not spoken to Jackson since. When Jordan was inducted into the Hall of Fame in 2009, Krause was not in attendance. Krause said he would not attend the ceremony over the Hall of Fame's refusal to induct Winter. Krause and Jackson briefly put their differences aside when Winter was finally inducted two years later. The two shook hands before the ceremony and conducted themselves in a cordial manner during Winter's segment.

=== Struggles with rebuilding ===
After the 1998 title, deciding that the Bulls were aging and facing an uncertain future, Krause chose to unload the veterans and rebuild. On 1997 draft night he explored the possibility of trading Pippen for the rights to a young 18-year-old Tracy McGrady. But McGrady said "Jerry Krause had an obsession with me." McGrady flew out to Chicago to work out with the Bulls with the possibility of joining the team. But the trade didn't happen, Bulls owner Jerry Reinsdorf vetoed the trade and many still believe Michael Jordan had a say in it. Krause was correct since neither Rodman nor Longley would play at their previous levels after leaving the Bulls, something Krause already feared due to what medical staff told him about these two players in the 1997-98 season. Pippen was also due for a significant raise as well, but also would not continue his previous stardom after leaving the Bulls. Krause "believed by pulling the plug on the dynasty instead of allowing it to expire of natural causes, he could avoid the sort of malaise that has endured with the Knicks for two decades", however this meant that Krause would be better remembered as the one who dismantled the Bulls championship teams rather than its architect.

The draft brought prolific collegiate players such as Elton Brand, Ron Artest, Marcus Fizer, Jamal Crawford, and Jay Williams to the Bulls. After the Bulls finished 15–67 during the 2000–2001 season, Krause decided to trade away his best player (Brand) for high schooler Tyson Chandler, who was hyped as "the next Kevin Garnett". He also drafted another high schooler, Eddy Curry, who was hyped as a slightly smaller version of Shaquille O'Neal, with the fourth overall pick in the draft. Krause believed that Chandler and Curry would develop into elite players and provide the foundation for another dynasty. A mid-season trade the following year brought scorer Jalen Rose to the Bulls in exchange for Brad Miller and Artest, clearing playing time for Chandler and Curry. After drafting Jay Williams during the offseason, the Bulls had a roster with Rose, Crawford, Curry, Chandler, Williams, and Fizer that fulfilled Krause's dream of a talented young athletic team. From the end of Jordan's retirement until Krause's final year, the Bulls posted a 96–282 (a .254 winning percentage) record.

== Later years and death ==
In 2003, Krause resigned from his post as general manager. He explained, "The rigors and stress of the job have caused me some minor physical problems in the past few years." The Bulls fell to 23–59 in the next season, and Krause's dream of a talented young athletic team imploded; all of his acquisitions were traded or out of the league within three years.

Krause went back to his roots and worked briefly for the New York Yankees as a scout before joining the New York Mets in 2005. In 2010, he rejoined the Chicago White Sox as a scout, a position he had held in the 1970s and 80s. He was appointed by the Arizona Diamondbacks as a special assistant in its scouting department on April 1, 2011. Krause retired from scouting in 2016.

On March 21, 2017, Krause died at the age of 77. He had been struggling with health issues such as osteomyelitis. He was inducted into the 2017 Basketball Hall of Fame class posthumously.

On January 12, 2024, in the Chicago Bulls home game against the Golden State Warriors, Krause's widow, Thelma, attended his Ring of Honor induction on his behalf for his contributions to the franchise's success. During the ceremony, some fans loudly booed Krause, bringing Thelma to tears. The fans’ reaction received heavy criticism from Warriors coach and former Bulls player Steve Kerr, Bulls announcer and former player Stacey King, ESPN's Brian Windhorst, NBA on TNT Analyst Charles Barkley, and former NBA player Kendrick Perkins.
