= Tim Grover =

Performance coach and author

Tim Singh Grover (born 1964) is a performance coach and author known for his work with basketball players Michael Jordan, Kobe Bryant, and Dwyane Wade.

== Early life and education ==
Grover was born in England to Indian parents and moved to the United States when he was four. He played for the UIC Flames men's basketball team from 1980 to 1984. He earned a bachelor's degree in kinesiology from the University of Illinois Chicago in 1984 and a master's degree in exercise science in 1986.

== Career ==
Grover founded Attack Athletics in 1989. That year, Jordan hired him as a personal trainer after a 30-day trial; they worked together for 15 years. Grover began working with Bryant in 2007. In 2008, Wade completed an eight-week rehabilitation and training program at Attack Athletics after knee surgery.

UIC Athletics presented Grover with a Lifetime Achievement Award at its 2010 Hall of Fame banquet. In 2018, UIC's College of Applied Health Sciences gave him its Distinguished Alumni Achievement Award.

In 2020, Grover appeared as an interviewee in The Last Dance, ESPN's documentary miniseries about Jordan and the 1990s Chicago Bulls.

== Publications ==
- Relentless: From Good to Great to Unstoppable (with Shari Lesser Wenk). Scribner, 2013. ISBN 978-1-4767-1093-8.
- Jump Attack: The Formula for Explosive Athletic Performance. Scribner, 2014. ISBN 978-1-4767-1440-0.
- Winning: The Unforgiving Race to Greatness (with Shari Wenk). Scribner, 2021. ISBN 978-1-9821-6886-5.
