= Gus Lett =

American bodyguard (1936–2000)

- Born: November 30, 1936
- Died: November 18, 2000 (aged 63)
- Known for: Bodyguarding Michael Jordan

Gus Lett (November 30, 1936 – November 18, 2000) was an American bodyguard and former police officer. He was most famous for serving as a bodyguard for basketball player and businessman Michael Jordan, where he became a father figure for the NBA superstar after the death of Jordan's father, James Jordan Sr.

== Early life ==
Before entering the bodyguarding business, Lett has worked as a patrolman for the Chicago Police Department.

== Work for Michael Jordan ==
Lett began working for Jordan in 1993, the same year as the death of Jordan's father. Lett joined John Wozniak and fellow former police officer Clarence Travis as a part of Jordan's entourage. In 1994, as Jordan quit basketball to pursue a baseball career, Jordan brought Lett along with him as a personal bodyguard, and was only formally re-hired by the Chicago Bulls in 1995 after Jordan's return to basketball.

Lett was often perceived as the sternest of Jordan's bodyguards, receiving the nickname 'General'. Despite this reputation, Lett also served as a father figure and confidant to Jordan as he grieved the death of his father.

== Illness and death ==
In 1998, Lett was diagnosed with lung cancer, which was reported to have been first noticed by Jordan. ESPN reported that Jordan personally paid for Lett's treatment at Northwestern University.

Though Lett had lost almost 20 pounds as he struggled with cancer treatment, Lett personally attended Game 7 of the Eastern Conference finals of 1998, which the Bulls would go on to win. After the game, Jordan cited his happiness that Lett was able to attend the game, citing him as a 'very positive inspiration'.

Lett died on November 18, 2000, due to complications from cancer.

== In popular culture ==
Lett was heavily featured in Episode 9 of the miniseries The Last Dance, which analyzed Lett's relationship with Jordan as well as the work done by Jordan's entourage.
