= Nike Air Ship =

Line of shoes by Nike

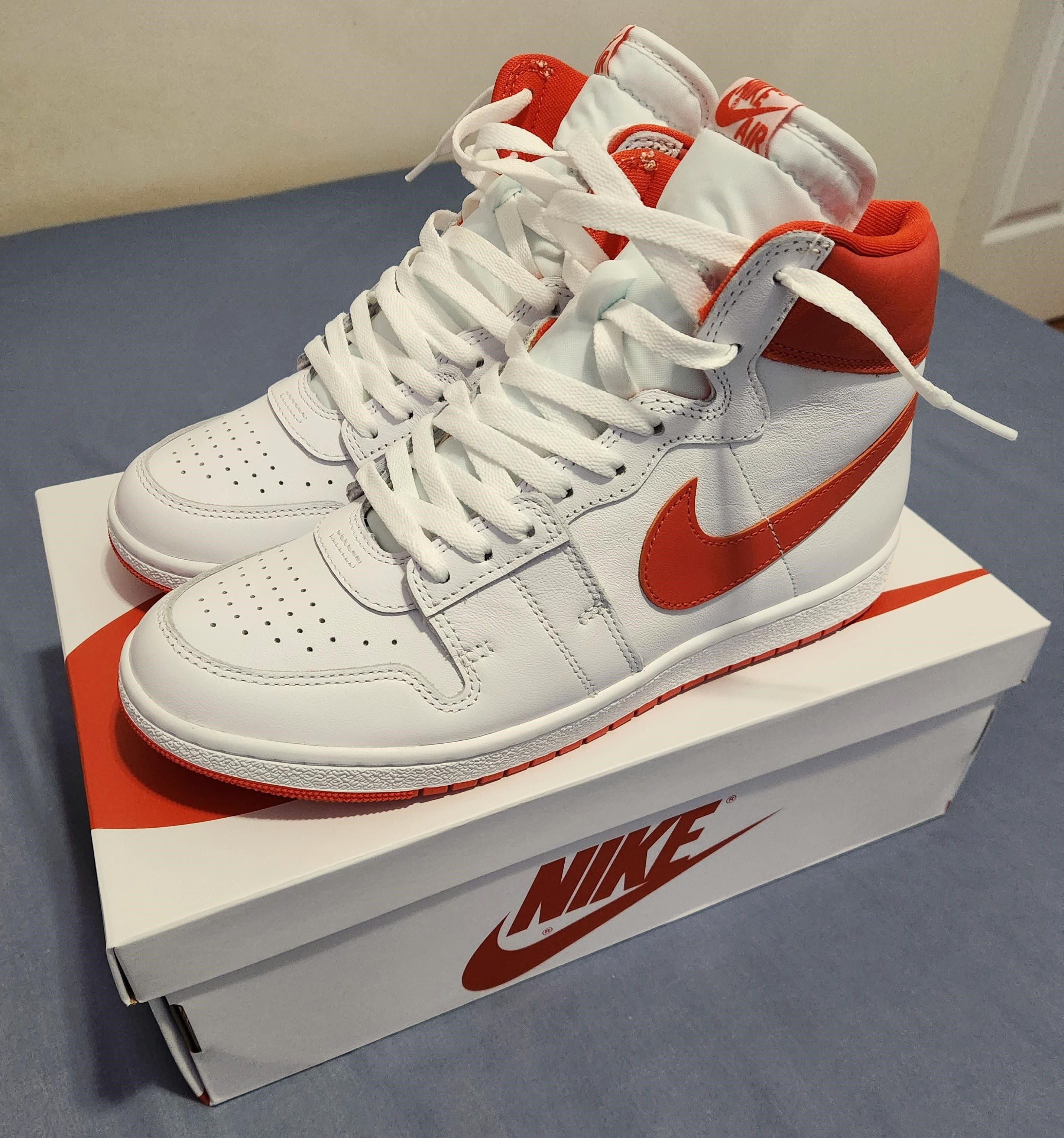
- Type: Sneakers
- Inventor: Nike, Inc.
- Inception: 1984; 42 years ago
- Manufacturer: Nike
- Available: Yes

Nike Air Ship is a basketball shoe released by Nike in 1984. The shoe is notable for being the first sneaker to ever be worn by Michael Jordan as part of his contract with Nike. The shoe has since been re-introduced by Nike as part of the Air Jordan line as the Jordan Air Ship.

== Overview ==
The shoes were designed by Bruce Kilgore and his next design following the Nike Air Force 1. Nike wanted the Air Ship to be a successor to the Air Force 1 and also be a team shoe that was suitable for all players. Unlike the Air Force 1, the shoe did not feature a velcro strap around the top of the shoe. It also added more color to the design by having an upper segment around the ankles and the edges around the laces in the same color as the swoosh logo with the rest of the shoe colored in black or white.

The shoe was set to launch in fall of 1984 and the company decided to have Michael Jordan wear the shoe while the company was still busy working on finishing his signature shoe, the Air Jordan 1.

== NBA ban ==
Jordan made his professional debut in the NBA with a black and red colorway of the sneakers. During that time, the league had a "uniform uniformity" rule that stated that the shoes of a player had to match the uniform of the teams. Jordan's version of the Air Ship did not match the design of the team uniforms and both he and Nike were warned that if he did not change them then he would be fined and then eventually suspended. Nike would later use the warning and the "banning" of the shoes by the league to promote the Air Jordan 1 in a commercial that featured the same colorway as the Air Ship shoes that he was fined for. The promotion proved successful and led to the Air Jordan 1 becoming popular during its launch.
