= Last Dance shoes =

Michael Jordan game-worn shoes

The Last Dance shoes are a pair of signed Air Jordan XIII shoes which were worn by Michael Jordan of the Chicago Bulls during game 2 of the 1998 NBA Finals.

The game took place in Utah on June 5, 1998, and the Chicago Bulls won. Jordan scored 37 points in the contest. After the game, Jordan gifted the shoes to ballboy Preston Truman, who assisted with the visiting team's locker room. The shoes get their name from the documentary miniseries The Last Dance, which focuses chiefly on Jordan and the 1997–98 NBA season.

The shoes were sold by Truman in 2020 for US$215,000. The shoes were later auctioned by the buyer in April 2023 for US$2.238 million, which was the highest sale price ever realized for any shoes. After the April 2023 auction, Truman retained counsel and filed a lawsuit to recover the shoes.

== Background ==
The shoes are size 13 'Bred' Air Jordan XIIIs. The word "bred" is shorthand for black and red which was the color of the shoes and the colors of the Chicago Bulls. Michael Jordan of the Chicago Bulls wore the shoes during the second half of game 2 of the 1998 NBA Finals against the Utah Jazz. The shoes were auctioned by Sotheby's in April 2023, and were expected to realize a sale price between two and four million US dollars. The shoes get their name from the ESPN and Netflix documentary titled, The Last Dance. It was called the last dance because it was Michael Jordan's last year with the Chicago Bulls.

== History ==
After the 1998 game, Michael Jordan gave the shoes to the Utah Jazz' ballboy Preston Truman. Jordan signed each of the shoes with a silver marker. Jordan had allegedly misplaced his coat during a practice, and it was found and returned to him by Truman, who had been attending to the visiting team. Jordan gave the shoes to Truman as thanks for finding the jacket. In 2020, Truman sold the shoes for US$215,000 through a private sale under the direction of Michael Russek of Grey Flannel Auctions.

The shoes realized a sale price of US$2.238M which was the highest sale price for any shoes. After the US$2.238M sale of the shoes Preston Truman filed a lawsuit against Grey Flannel Auctions and Michael Russek to get the shoes back. He also sued for monetary damages.
