= Jumpman (logo) =

Logo owned by Nike to promote the Air Jordan brand

The "Jumpman" logo, used by Nike to promote its Air Jordan brand of shoes, among other merchandise

The Jumpman logo is a silhouette of basketball player Michael Jordan. It was crafted by Nike shoe designer Peter Moore, with Jordan recreating the pose from a magazine photo. The logo is owned by Nike to promote the Air Jordan brand of basketball sneakers and other sportswear and footwear.

== History ==
The "Jumpman" logo originated from a photo shoot Michael Jordan did for Life magazine at the University of North Carolina at Chapel Hill campus before he played for Team USA in the 1984 Summer Olympics, photographed by Co Rentmeester. Jordan posed in a manner identical to the grand jeté ballet technique, while holding a basketball with his left hand, and wearing his Olympic jumpsuit and New Balance shoes. Moore, who was in charge of the design team, came across this Life magazine issue and had Jordan replicate the pose, this time in Chicago and wearing his Bulls uniform and Nike Air Jordan shoes.

The "Jumpman" logo was introduced in 1988, on the third version of the Air Jordan shoes. In 1997, it became the logo for Nike's Jordan brand. It has developed and gone through different changes and can be seen on sneakers, attire, hats, socks, and other forms of wear. It has become one of the most recognizable logos in the athletics industry.

Jordan is a former National Basketball Association (NBA) player and current Charlotte Hornets minority owner. He is the most popular basketball player in the world.

== Lawsuit ==
On January 22, 2015, photographer Jacobus Rentmeester sued Nike, claiming copyright infringement over the use of the Jumpman logo. According to Rentmeester, Nike copied a photograph for which he had not granted the company any temporary permission to use for the logo or any other purposes. The suit was tried in a federal court in Portland, Oregon, and the judge ruled against Rentmeester in June 2015. In February 2018 a U.S. appeals court upheld the decision.

== Overseas copyright battle ==
To profit off the success of the Jordan brand, the Chinese company Qiaodan (meaning "Jordan" in Chinese) Sports, founded in 2000, registered several kinds of trademarks that related to Jordan, including the current name of the company with Chinese characters and pinyin along with the logo of a silhouetted basketball player. Taking advantage of the fact that international trademarks are not protected if they are not registered in mainland China due to the first-to-file policy, Qiaodan Sports had been exceptionally fruitful in the Chinese market utilizing the fame of Michael Jordan. In 2012 Jordan sued Qiaodan Sports for using the Jumpman logo to sell their products and even selling the shoes under his name because the name of the company in Mandarin is Jordan. This misled customers to believing that they were buying products from Jordan himself, but in all reality it was not his shoe. Jordan would lose the legal battle because "the image of the disputed trademark is a human body in a shadowy design, which does not clearly reflect the major appearances of the figure. It is hard for the relevant public to recognize the image as Michael Jordan."

In July 2017, Qiaodan Sports filed a lawsuit against Michael Jordan for infringement of reputation and demanded CN¥1.1 million (US$162,500) in compensation. In the filing, Qiaodan claimed that Jordan had "maliciously" initiated 78 trademarks disputes over a number of years but had only managed to win three of them. On April 8, 2020, after eight years of Chinese trademark battle, Jordan finally prevailed over Qiaodan Sports at the China People's Supreme Court, resulting in revocation of 74 trademarks for Qiaodan Sports. The People's Supreme Court explained that "natural persons have the right to their name in accordance with the law. Unauthorized registration of a name as a trademark may easily misled the relevant public to believing that the goods or services marked with the trademark have a specific endorsement, permission, etc. This violates the provisions of Article 31 of the Trademark Law." Jordan also claimed for portrait right against Qiaodan Sports' logo. However, prosecutors claimed that "the Qiaodan's logo did not violate Jordan's portraiture rights as it does not include distinguishable facial features." In spite of this case, the Jordan brand continues to battle cases with other companies copying the Jordan Jumpman logo.

== In popular culture ==
The song "Jumpman" by Drake and Future takes its name from the Jumpman logo and mentions the brand multiple times in its lyrics.

Buckethead's composition "Jordan" references the Jumpman logo in the single cover, and the name of the song references Michael Jordan.
