= Air Jordan =

American basketball and sportswear brand by Nike

- The silhouette of Michael Jordan served as inspiration to create the "Jumpman" logo.
- Product type: Basketball shoes, sportswear shoes and clothing
- Current owner: Nike
- Country: United States
- Introduced: November 17, 1984; 42 years ago (Note: The date Michael Jordan first arrived the "Air Jordans I" at a Chicago Bulls NBA home game against the Philadelphia 76ers.)
- Markets: Worldwide
- Website: nike.com/jordan

Air Jordan is a line of basketball and sportswear shoes produced by Nike, Inc. The shoes, related apparel and accessories are now marketed under Jordan Brand. The first Air Jordan shoe was produced for basketball player Michael Jordan during his time with the Chicago Bulls on November 17, 1984, and released to the public on April 1, 1985. The shoes were designed for Nike by Peter Moore, Tinker Hatfield, and Bruce Kilgore. The brand's logo, known as the "Jumpman", originated from a photograph by Co Rentmeester that was taken before Jordan played for Team USA in the 1984 Summer Olympics.

== History ==
As Michael Jordan entered his rookie year in 1984, he was approached to sign a shoe deal with Adidas, Converse, and Nike. In their meeting with Jordan, Nike centered its presentation around a highlight video of Jordan's various slam dunks, scored to "Jump (For My Love)" by the Pointer Sisters. Nike showcased the first design of the shoe, but Jordan criticized its colorway. While other companies saw Jordan as a figure for promoting preexisting shoe lines, Nike took Jordan's criticism into account to make him "a stand alone star and give him a signature shoe line."

On October 26, 1984, Jordan signed a six-year, $2.5 million deal with Nike, three times more than any other deal in the National Basketball Association (NBA) at the time. In addition, Jordan would get royalties from products sold by Nike with his name, which was at the time considered an industry disruptive move. Nike released the Air Jordan sneaker line in April 1985 with the goal of making $3 million in the first three years. Sales greatly exceeded expectations, earning $126 million in one year.

NBA policy stated that the shoes must be 51% white and consistent with the shoes that the rest of the team wore. Failure to follow this policy resulted in a $5,000 fine per game (equivalent to $15,000 in 2025). Nike designed the Air Jordan I based on the Chicago Bulls' red and black team colors with only 23% white, which violated the NBA's policy. Nike agreed to pay each fine, garnering both controversy and publicity around the shoe. Fines imposed by the NBA on Jordan for wearing the shoes bestowed upon them an iconic brand and was later regarded as groundbreaking in part due to its defiance of NBA regulations. Nike also took advantage of this marketing opportunity with the Air Jordan I "Banned" advertisement, which stated "On September 15th, Nike created a revolutionary new basketball shoe. On October 18th, the NBA threw them out of the game." The shoe sold out of the initial 50,000 pairs and ultimately generated more than $150 million in sales.

In 1997, Jordan and Nike introduced Jordan Brand (originally called "Brand Jordan"). The brand has built a sustainable business model by releasing Air Jordan shoes and apparel, and collaborating with popular artists. In 2022 alone, Jordan Brand brought in $5.1 billion to Nike. Of that, a reported $150–256 million went directly to Jordan under his royalties deal with Nike.

== Logo ==
The "Jumpman" logo originated from a photo shoot Michael Jordan did for Life magazine at the University of North Carolina at Chapel Hill campus before he played for Team USA in the 1984 Summer Olympics, photographed by Co Rentmeester. Jordan posed in a manner identical to the grand jeté ballet technique, while holding a basketball with his left hand, and wearing his Olympic jumpsuit and New Balance shoes. Moore, who was in charge of the design team, came across this Life magazine issue and had Jordan replicate the pose, this time in Chicago and wearing his Bulls uniform and Nike Air Jordan shoes. The "Jumpman" logo has developed and gone through different changes and can be seen on sneakers, attire, hats, socks, and other forms of wear. It has become one of the most recognizable logos in the athletics industry.

== Models ==
Model	Year	Notes
Air Jordan I	1984	The first Air Jordan was produced for use by Michael Jordan in November 1984. They were designed by Peter B. Moore, and released during Jordan's sophomore season with the Chicago Bulls. The Jordan 1 Royal was never worn by Michael Jordan on an NBA court. The black and red Air Jordan 1 has been re-released several times, starting in 1994. The red and black colorway of the Nike Air Ship, the prototype for the Jordan I, was later outlawed by then-NBA Commissioner David Stern for having very little white on them. (This rule, known as the "51 percent" rule, was repealed in the late 2000s.)
Air Jordan II	1986	The success of the Air Jordan I encouraged Nike to release a new Air Jordan in 1986 for the new basketball season. Designed by Peter Moore and Bruce Kilgore, the Air Jordan II was originally made in Italy. In early tests, Michael Jordan wore a prototype that fused the upper of the original Air Jordan with the cushioning being designed for the new model. The Air Jordan II featured a full-length Air-Sole unit and a polyurethane midsole. The shoe bore a similar silhouette to the Nike Air Python that would release the following year. It featured a faux lizard skin and swooping lines that resembled the detailing of a sports car. This design aesthetic would factor into the Air Jordan line later in the series. The Air Jordan II was the first Jordan not to have the Nike swoosh on the upper, though "Nike" was stitched across the heel counter. Michael Jordan wore the Air Jordan II for a shortened 18 games in the 1985–86 season due to a broken foot. It had several re-releases as the Jordan 2 Retro.
Air Jordan III	1988	The Air Jordan III featured the debut of the Jumpman logo. Jordan Brand reintroduced the Air Jordan III in the True Blue colorway as an international-only release in 2009. On February 15, 2020, a "Red Cement" version was released in celebration of Chicago, Illinois, hosting the 2020 NBA All-Star Game. The brand also debuted a Chicago-exclusive version of the colorway. This pair features "Nike Chi" branding on the heel, replacing the traditional "Nike Air" branding.
Air Jordan IV	1989	In December 1988, Nike released the Air Jordan IV to the public. Designed by Tinker Hatfield, it was the first Air Jordan released on the global market. It had four colorways: White/Black, Black/Cement Grey, White/Fire Red-Black, and Off White/Military Blue. Nike featured director and actor Spike Lee in ads for the shoe. Lee had featured the shoe in his movie Do The Right Thing. Michael Jordan wore the Air Jordan IV when he made "The Shot", a series winner in Game 5 of the 1989 NBA First Round between the Chicago Bulls and the Cleveland Cavaliers. In 2012 a Cavalier colorway dubbed the "Cavs" was released to honor "The Shot".
Air Jordan V	1990	The Air Jordan V was released in February 1990 and designed by Hatfield. Inspired by a WWII Mustang fighter, features include a reflective tongue with a protruding design, translucent rubber soles and lace locks. The Air Jordan V saw a lot of use in popular sitcom The Fresh Prince of Bel-Air. During many episodes Will Smith wore the Metallic Silver, Grape, and Fire Red colorways. To pay tribute to his character, Jordan released the Air Jordan 5 Bel Air in 2013 and 2020.
Air Jordan VI	1991	Designed after a German sports car, Michael Jordan wore the VI for his first Bulls championship. The shoes were worn by the protagonist of the manga Slam Dunk, Hanamichi Sakuragi. In 2014, Nike released special versions of the VI featuring artwork from the series. Various other models in the Air Jordan line are featured in the series, including the original Air Jordan, the V, and the XII.
Air Jordan VII	1992	The Air Jordan VII introduced "huarache" technology which allowed the shoes to better conform to the user's foot. A few things were no longer featured on the new model, such as the visible air sole, the Nike Air logo, and the translucent soles. This was the first Air Jordan in the line that did not have any distinctive "Nike Air" branding on the outer portions of the shoe, only on the in-soles. When Jordan went to compete at the 1992 Summer Olympics to play for the US Men's Basketball Team (also known as the "Dream Team"), Nike released a special Olympic color combo of the Air Jordan VII model which had Jordan's Olympic jersey number 9, instead of the usual "23" found on other colorways. Various models of the Air Jordan VII were re-released beginning with its 10-year anniversary in 2002.
Air Jordan VIII	1993	The Air Jordan VIII was released to coincide with the 1992–93 NBA season. The eighth model of the Air Jordan contains a full-length air sole, polyurethane midsole, polycarbonate shank plate, and two crossover straps. The VIIIs were known for a successful ad campaign in which Bugs Bunny appeared alongside Michael Jordan to market the shoes. Since their initial release in 1993 and rerelease in 2003, Jordan Brand continues to produce new and classic colorways of the shoe as of 2025.
Air Jordan IX	1993	Originally released in November 1993, the Air Jordan IX was the first model released after Michael Jordan's retirement. Jordan never played an NBA season wearing these shoes. This model was inspired by baseball cleats that Jordan wore when playing minor-league baseball. The shoe was re-released in 2002, 2008, 2010, 2012, and 2014–2018. Like the VII and VIII models, the Air Jordan IX featured an inner sock sleeve and nubuck accents. The sole featured different symbols and languages of different countries. The Air Jordan IX is depicted to be worn by the Statue of Michael Jordan inside the United Center in Chicago.
Air Jordan X	1994	This was released in different colors representing U.S. cities. It was the first Air Jordan to feature a lightweight Phylon midsole. The shoe also featured all of Michael Jordan's accomplishments up to his first retirement on the outsole. The shoe was re-released in 2005, 2008, 2012–2016, and 2018.
Air Jordan XI	1995	This model was designed by Tinker Hatfield. When the shoe launched, Michael Jordan (retired from basketball by then) was with the Birmingham Barons in baseball's minor baseball leagues. Hatfield designed the sneaker waiting for Jordan to come back and hoping he would play in them. The ballistic mesh upper of the sneaker was meant to make the Air Jordan XI lighter and more durable. Further changes came with the use of a carbon fiber spring plate in the translucent outsole, giving the shoe better torque when twisting on the court. The best-known aspect of the shoe is its patent leather mudguard. Patent leather was lightweight compared to genuine leather and also tended not to stretch as much – a property to help keep the foot within the bounds of the foot bed during directional changes on the court. The patent leather gave the XI a "formal" look. When this shoe released, some wore this model with business suits instead of dress shoes. The sneakers were only samples in 1995 when Jordan decided to come back to the NBA. Hatfield and Nike discouraged Jordan from playing in them, but once they were produced, he couldn't resist. Also noteworthy, Jordan violated league dress code by wearing the shoes, as his teammates wore all-black shoes. It wasn't the first time Jordan had run afoul of NBA footwear rules, having broken them with his very first signature shoe in 1985. He was fined $5,000 for not following the Bulls' colorway policy with the AJ XI. After the fine, Nike made him a pair of the shoes in a black/white/concord colorway for the series against Orlando; Jordan wore Penny Hardaway's signature black Nike Air Flight shoes for Game 3 while said colorway was under production. A similar black/white/royal blue colorway was released to the public at the end of 2000. The colorway was changed for the public release because the concord purple had looked like royal blue on television. Jordan wore the Air Jordan XI on the way to helping the Chicago Bulls claim the 1995–96 NBA Championship. He also wore the XI white Columbia colorway in the 1996 NBA All-Star Game and was selected MVP of the game. The shoes received more media exposure when Jordan wore the Air Jordan XI model in the 1996 animated movie Space Jam. These shoes were eventually released in 2000 and re-released in 2009 and 2016 with the nickname "Space Jams". The concord purple was changed to royal blue for the released versions of the shoe. The Air Jordan XI is one of the most popular Air Jordans in the series and is Hatfield's favorite. They were also Michael Jordan's favorite.
Air Jordan XII	1996	The Air Jordan XII featured a "Rising Sun" motif mimicking the Flag of Japan. Four different colorways were used by Jordan in the 1996–97 season. During the regular season, he wore either the "Taxi" white/black colorway or the "Chicago" white/red colorway. On home playoff games and in the 1997 NBA All-Star Game, Jordan wore the "Playoffs" black/white colorway, and on road playoff games, he wore the "Flu Game" or "Bred" black/red colorway. The latter colorway was most famously worn by Jordan during Game 5 of the 1997 NBA Finals, hence its name.
Air Jordan XIII	1997	This model had a carbon fiber plate, designed by Hatfield. The black panther was the inspiration for the Air Jordan XIII, with the sole resembling the pads on a panther's paw. A hologram on the back of the shoe imitates a panther's eyes in the dark. They were re-released in 2005, which coincided with the release of the Air Jordan 8s shoe. In the movie He Got Game, director Spike Lee had access to the Air Jordan XIII months before it was available to the public or even worn by Jordan himself and featured it in scenes. Jordan Brand re-released the Air Jordan XIII at the end of 2010, which included the French Blue/Flint Grey, White/Red-Black, "Playoff" color way and the Black/Altitude Green color way. In 2017, Jordan Brand released the "History of Flight" colorway. This colorway is from the 2009 World Basketball Festival, where the "History of Flight" collection was revealed to celebrate Jordan's 25th anniversary. In April 2023, Michael Jordan's Air Jordan 13s from the 1997–98 Chicago Bulls season sold for $2.2 million, setting a world record for the most valuable sneakers ever sold.
Air Jordan XIV	1998	Inspired by the Ferrari 550 M which Michael Jordan owned, the Air Jordan XIV was originally released in October 1998. It was re-released in 2005, 2006, 2008, 2011, 2012 and 2014–2018. The Air Jordan XIV co-styled by Hatfield and Mark Smith was made race ready and equipped with the Jordan Jumpman insignia on a Ferrari shaped badge. The color scheme of predominant black accentuated with red was nicknamed "The Last Shot" because Michael Jordan wore them as he hit the game winning shot over Bryon Russell, of the Utah Jazz, in his final game with the Chicago Bulls in the 1998 NBA Finals. There are 14 Jumpman logos—7 on each shoe—corresponding the shoes' number in the series.
Air Jordan XV	1999	This was the first shoe after Jordan's second retirement. The design was inspired by the North American X-15, which was developed by NASA during the 1950s. The sides of the XV were made from woven kevlar fiber. The Jordan XVs were Hatfield's least favorite in the series.
Air Jordan XVI	2001	The shoe came with spats, and the design was inspired by performance cars and architecture. The ad campaign featured Mos Def.
Air Jordan XVII	2002	This pair of Jordans came with a multimedia CD-ROM containing the Air Jordan XVII song. The retail price of the shoe was US$200. The defining functional design element of the Air Jordan XVII model, which was later replicated on the Air Jordan XXIII model, was the reinforced mid-sole which provided a sturdy and stable chassis for the shoe. They were made in four mid top colors and three low-top colors. Michael Jordan wore the XVII while playing for the Washington Wizards, after his second retirement return. The shoe was re-released in 2008 and 2016.
Air Jordan XVIII	2003	The Air Jordan XVIII shoe was released during Michael Jordan's last season, in which he played for the Washington Wizards. The shoe was designed by Air Jordan Senior Footwear Designer, Tate Kuerbis, who had been part of the Jordan footwear design team since 1999 and with Nike since 1995. The inspiration for the design came from the carbon fiber-based monocoque of F1 race cars, race car driving shoes (rubber heel wrap) and Fine Italian dress shoes (bold stitching on the soles). It was re-released in 2008.
Air Jordan XIX	2004	This is the first Jordan release after his third, and final, retirement which came after the 2002–03 NBA season. The design was inspired by the black mamba snake, and two original colorways where released: white/flint gray and black/red. Three regional colorways and three special edition colorways were released. They consisted of the East, West, and Midwest edition for regular and West, East, and Olympic for the SE (special edition). The Air Jordan XIX used innovative materials. The upper section of shoe was developed in collaboration with the global materials consultancy Material ConneXion, who sourced Nike a sleeving normally used in architectural applications for protecting PVC pipes from bursting. In theory, this allowed for a shoe without laces, because the sleeving does not stretch. Nonetheless, the Air Jordan XIX model did include a set of laces behind the sleeve to better secure the shoe. They are known to be the lightest Air Jordans ever made. The shoes appeared on the sitcom My Wife and Kids, in the episode "Fantasy Camp: Part 2", when the protagonist Michael Kyle (Damon Wayans) steals it from Jordan's hotel room and uses it to play against Jordan himself later in the episode. Michael Jordan wears "AJ IV Cool Grey" in the episode. The shoe was re-released in 2008.
Air Jordan XX	2005	The Air Jordan XX was inspired by low-cut motorcycle shoes as Jordan got into motorcycle racing. The strap was placed in the center of the shoe over the laces. It also helped to create a tighter fit and increased support. The shoe was re-released in 2008 and 2015.
Air Jordan XXI	2006	The Air Jordan XXI model of shoes was designed by D'Wayne Edwards and inspired by sport touring vehicles. The shoe features lower-foot air grilles, double-overlasted Phylon midsole, a carbon fiber shank plate and a seamless diamond-quilted bootie. It came with removable parts that could make the cushioning firm or soft, and had text that could be seen under a blacklight. The Air Jordan XXI was introduced on television by the "Second Generation" advertisement.
Air Jordan XX2	2007	The XX2 was inspired by the F-22 Raptor. The promo commercial was directed by Mark Romanek.
Air Jordan XX3	2008	The Air Jordan XX3 was designed by Tinker Hatfield. It was the first basketball shoe in the "Nike Considered" category, for using materials from not more than 200 miles (320 km) from a Nike Factory. It features a hand-stitched exterior, full-length bootie, carbon fiber shank plate, the last to feature interchangeable IPS pillars, and an articulated chassis. The shoe was released on January 25, 2008, and was the last Air Jordan until the XX8 to have Roman numeral identification. The shoe was re-released in 2015–2016.
Air Jordan 2009	2009	The Air Jordan 2009 was designed by Jason Mayden and was the first Air Jordan model named after the year of its release rather than its numbered system. Inspired by Jordan's defensive focus, the shoe incorporates Articulated Propulsion Technology used by Paralympian runners. It also features a durable pleated silk upper, protective Thermoplastic polyurethane (TPU) chassis, carbon fiber arch plate and Zoom Air structure. The shoe was released on January 31, 2009, and has not been re-released.
Air Jordan 2010	2010	This was released during the 25th anniversary of the Air Jordan Brand. The base of each midsole has stylized text that when combined reads: "I've failed over and over and over again in my life. And that is why I succeed." This quote is a reference to a 1997 advertising campaign, with Michael Jordan detailing his failures that led to his career successes.
Air Jordan 2011	2011	The shoe has interchangeable insoles – a red one for power and a blue one for quickness. Four colorways of the shoe were released corresponding with the 2011 All Star Game: White/Black, White/Red and White/Blue that represented the East/West Jersey Colors. The "Year of the Rabbit" colorway was a limited release that celebrated Michael Jordan's Chinese zodiac sign. The 2011 has a star-constellation pattern that also serves as ventilation. It uses patent leather wrapped around the shoe. The shoes are hand burnished and crafted. A dress shoe that feels similar to the XI was reportedly the goal. The shoe has not been re-released.
Air Jordan 2012	2012	The Air Jordan 2012 offers six customization configurations. Two interchangeable sleeves and three insoles adapt to different playing styles. The Deluxe model was launched on February 8, while the customization Flight models were released on February 25, 2012. It was the final Air Jordan model to be named after the year it was released as the numbered system returned in 2013 with the Air Jordan XX8.
Air Jordan XX8	2013	The Air Jordan XX8, designed by Tinker Hatfield, was released on February 16, 2013. The outside shroud was made from a Swiss fabric used for motorcycle jackets.
Air Jordan XX9	2014	The Air Jordan XX9, also designed by Hatfield, released in September 2014 in both an elephant print and a knit edition. The shoe debuted in the NBA by Russell Westbrook and Kawhi Leonard. The shoe has a performance woven upper, with areas that are stiff and others that are more flexible. Jordan released two versions, a regular cut and low version. Some of the colorways released in low version are buckets, Chicago bulls, UNC, and infrared.
Air Jordan XXX	2016	The Air Jordan XXX was again designed by Tinker Hatfield. The first colorway of the shoe released on February 16. The shoe consists of an upper and outsole similar to the XX9. The upper has a flyknit-constructed ankle collar that overextends slightly. The outsole has a more noticeable change, with a different traction pattern, while the midsole remains almost identical.
Air Jordan XXXI	2016	The Air Jordan XXXI is heavily influenced by the Air Jordan 1s, having a leather upper and swoosh, Jumpman, and Jordan "Wings" logos. Its retail debut was on September 3, 2016, in the "Banned" colorway, for the 30th anniversary of the NBA banning the Air Jordan 1. Notable appearances of the shoe include the "USA" colorway worn during the 2016 Olympic basketball tournament by members of team USA.
Air Jordan XXXII	2017	The Air Jordan XXXII was influenced by the Air Jordan 2 and included a Jordan "Wings" logo. It first released in the "Rossa Corsa" colorway on September 23, 2017. A "Banned" colorway was released on October 18, 2017. Another special edition called the "Russ" colorway was released to celebrate Russell Westbrook's sponsorship with Jordan Brand. Jordan Brand released 2 types of this shoe, the original mid length cut and low cut.
Air Jordan XXXIII	2018	The Air Jordan XXXIII was released on October 18, 2018. This is the first Air Jordan model to go laceless.
Air Jordan XXXIV	2019	The Air Jordan XXXIV was released on September 25, 2019, with details such as a commemorative date for the brand's 30th anniversary.
Air Jordan XXXV	2020	The Air Jordan XXXV debuted in the Fall of 2020 with a distinct new shape. The model focused on weight reduction for responsiveness. An area of the midfoot had a hole to provide stability, bounce, and comfort. The Air Jordan had several collaborations with contemporary NBA players, including Jayson Tatum and Zion Williamson.
Air Jordan XXXVI	2021	The Air Jordan XXXVI was first teased by German-American professional basketball player Satou Sabally via social media, and made its on-court debut on March 25, 2021.
Air Jordan XXXVII	2022	The Air Jordan XXXVII was released on July 28, 2022.
Air Jordan XXXVIII	2023	The Air Jordan XXXVIII contains a Cushlon 3.0 midsole along with a Zoom Strobel Unit. It was released on August 18, 2023, for $200.
Air Jordan XXXIX	2024	The Air Jordan XXXIX was released in July 2024.
Air Jordan 40	2025	The Air Jordan 40 was released in July 2025.

== Other shoes from the Air Jordan line ==
=== The Jordan Packages ===
"Spizike"

The Jordan Spiz'ike shoes were released on October 21, 2006, as a tribute to Michael Jordan and Spike Lee's relationship. The relationship began when Mars Blackmon (a character from Spike Lee's film, She's Gotta Have It) became a pitchman in Nike commercials for Air Jordans. The Spiz'ike is a blend of the Jordan III, IV, V, VI, and XX shoes. Only 4,032 pairs were made of the original release, with the proceeds going to a new film institute at Morehouse College.

"Defining Moments"

Released in 2006 retailing at $295 containing the sneakers Michael Jordan wore during his first championship of his two three-peats. The Retro 11 Concord contains a gold Jumpman on the side, but originally was meant to also have gold eyelets spelling out Jordan. This was changed because of color bleeding. The retro 6 Black Infrared replaces its infrared for gold as well. Both shoes contained dog tags to reference the title won and a booklet showcasing a slam dunk highlight of the game and concept art of the shoe. Some of the original DMP Retro 11 Concords have surfaced and are considered some of the rarest Air Jordans.

"Defining Moments II"

The "raging bull pack" retailed for $310 and drew inspiration from the running of the bull that takes place every year in Spain. The pack contains two Air Jordan 5s; the Toro Bravo and the 3m. The Toro Bravo is a red suede sneaker, one of the first of its kind, and it takes inspiration from the red bandanas worn by the runners. The second pair, the 3m, is named after its reflective coating. Both shoes come in a wood gate exterior graphic box with double sided slide out, originally released in 2009.

"Defining Moments III"

The Jordan Brand released a third "Defining Moments" package on July 11, 2009. The 60+ Air Jordan Retro 1 Package is inspired by Jordan scoring 63 points on the Celtics in a double overtime playoff game during his second year. The Air Jordan Retro 1 60+ Package features a re-release of the sneakers that Jordan wore during that game, and a Retro Air Jordan 1 inspired by the Celtics colors and the parquet floors from the old Boston Garden.

"Defining Moments IV"

Retro 6 Infrared Pack

The Jordan 6 white/infrared and black/infrared was released February 14, 2013, at a retail price of US$170. This is the second of the same colorway retro in Jordan Brand history. The first time retro on both colorways were in 2000, they were retro separately. This time, the retro was distinguished from the previous release by using the Jumpman logo instead of the Nike Air logo on the heel.

"Old Love New Love"

2007 brought the release of the Jordan Brand's second two-pair package named the "Old Love New Love" (OLNL), which was released on April 21. The pack featured two colorways of the Air Jordan I Retro - the original White/Black-Varsity Red (Black Toes) and a new pair in Black/Varsity-Maize/White. The pack represented Jordan's two main passions, the old love being basketball the new love being motorcycle racing. The Old Love New Love package was sold for $200.00. This release marked a comeback for the Air Jordan 1 paving the way for a slew of colorways, including the modified "Phat" version with additional padding.

=== Jordan "6 Rings" shoe ===
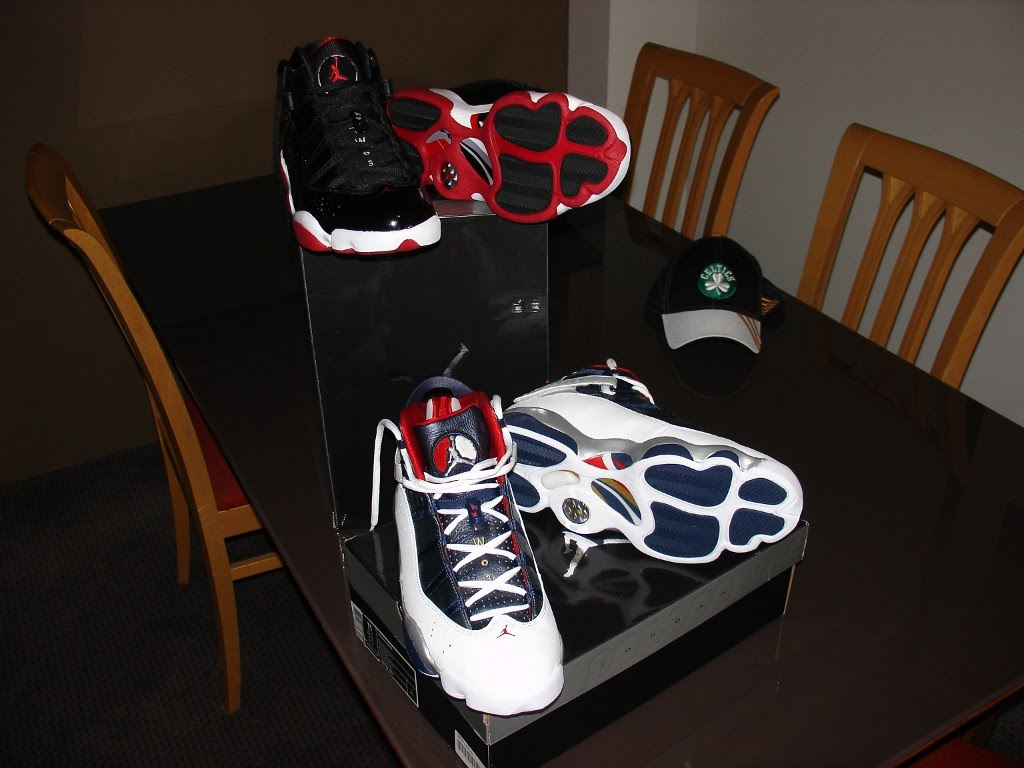
Air Jordan "6 rings" in two colorways

The Jordan 6 Rings (aka Jordan Six Rings, Or Montells) is a combination of the seven Air Jordan shoes that Michael Jordan wore during his 6 championship seasons. That includes the Air Jordan 6, 7, 8, 11, 12, 13 and 14. The Jordan Brand company released the 6 Rings shoes starting in September 2008.

Jordan Brand released colorways representative of each team that the Chicago Bulls defeated in their six championship seasons during the 1990s: The Los Angeles Lakers, Portland Trail Blazers, Phoenix Suns, Seattle SuperSonics, and Utah Jazz. The shoes include laser-etched graphics detailing specific aspects about that particular championship series and the city of the competing team. Many other colorways exist.

There also exists a "winterized 6 rings" which are a modified 6 Rings shoe turned into a durable boot designed for the outdoors which changes some of the design and placement of the parts.

== Controversies ==
The polyurethane (PU) material in the soles of many Air Jordan models can break down over time, and many collectors find that their vintage pairs are often unwearable. Known as PU degradation, polyurethane soles are susceptible to hydrolysis and oxidation, and shoes with this material have been found to have a poor aging performance. Nike does not provide information as to the type of PU they use in their Air Jordan lines, and have avoided answering questions in the past, as was the case in Wired's widely cited article on the PU controversy within the sneaker community, "We asked Nike about PU degradation and what might be done about it, but the company declined to comment."

The Air Jordan line has been associated with riots, assaults, robberies, and murders. Fifteen-year-old high school student Michael Eugene Thomas was choked to death by one of his peers for a pair of Air Jordan sneakers in 1989. In 1988, principal Dr. Robin Oden of Mumford High School in Detroit mentioned that clothing-related violence had reached a point where he felt it was necessary to ban certain items of clothing, including the Air Jordan sneaker, from school grounds. This ban was the first of many dress codes implemented in schools after a wave of robberies, beatings, and shootings over possession of Air Jordan sneakers and other items of clothing.

=== Manufacturing ===
Nike owns none of the factories where Air Jordans are produced and contracts the work to various factory owners. Company officials say that they only design and market the shoes. However, Nike dictates production terms and standards to the contractor, often without questioning labor or safety practices. In April 1997, 10,000 Indonesian workers went on strike over wage violations at an Air Jordan factory. The same month in Vietnam 1,300 workers went on strike demanding a 1-cent-per-hour raise, and a year later in 1998, 3,000 workers in China went on strike to protest hazardous working conditions and low wages.

== Social and cultural impact ==
Air Jordans became a status symbol in sneaker culture with global sales. The impact of Air Jordans expanded from basketball and sports into fashion, pop culture, and hip-hop. Air Jordans becoming a staple in casual wear and streetwear culture. The popularity of the sneaker has risen from its connection to the hip-hop scene since 1985. Rappers in the 1990s including 2Pac, The Notorious B.I.G., Ice Cube, and Jay-Z mentioned Michael Jordan's sneakers and success in their music. They were also seen on many hip-hop album covers including Eazy-E wearing Air Jordan III on the Eazy-Duz-It album cover and music videos including "Otis" where Jay-Z and Kanye West are seen wearing the Air Jordan I and Air Jordans VI. The shoes were also worn by many artists and celebrities on a casual and everyday basis. Collaborations between hip-hop artists and the Jordan Brand also drove its popularity, including Travis Scott's "Cactus Jack" collaborations with the Jordan Brand and Nike. With the Jordan Brand having a huge impact on hip-hop culture, it became a status symbol.

=== Sneaker collecting ===
The shoes had a large impact on the rise of "sneakerhead" culture. In the 1980s, collecting sneakers became more common, as well as trading and reselling them. As new models came out, more Air Jordans became in demand and a significant shoe to have in collections. Reselling Air Jordans became highly profitable and hundreds or thousands of dollars are spent on rare sneakers, including the original 1985 Air Jordan I on StockX selling up to $20,000. Upon the height and rise of the sneaker community, the resale market is estimated to be worth $2 billion and is expected to gain $4 billion more by 2025. The growth is due to collaborations, limited editions drops, and other factors. With the sneakers evolving over time and introducing new models, the sneakers have been rising in value for collectors and becoming a staple in their collections.

=== Collaborations ===
Air Jordan has collaborated with many brands and artists, including celebrities Drake, Billie Eilish, J Balvin, DJ Khaled, Eminem, Nicki Minaj, Future and Mark Wahlberg. After a collaboration with Nike on its Air Force One in 2017, rapper Travis Scott partnered with Jordan Brand to design "Cactus Jack" iterations of the Air Jordan 1, Air Jordan 4 and Air Jordan 6.

Air Jordan worked with streetwear brands, fashion houses, and soccer clubs. Collaborations include Virgil Abloh and his brand Off-White, Supreme, Comme des Garçons, Kaws, Dior, and Paris Saint-Germain.

=== Television and films ===
The Air Jordans have been seen throughout television, including The Fresh Prince of Bel-Air, where Will Smith wears different models of the shoe throughout the show including the "Metallic" Air Jordan Vs in the pilot episode and the "Colombia" Air Jordan XI in the last episode of the series. With the impact that the show made on the Jordan Brand, they released a few pairs of Air Jordan Vs that associate to the show.

There are films that have influenced the Air Jordan's design. In 1989, the film Do the Right Thing portrayed a character "Buggin Out" (Giancarlo Esposito) in a clean pair of Air Jordan 4s that became scuffed. Jordan Brand released a Jordan 4 that was designed as a replica of the scuffed ones that Buggin Out wore. Air Jordan sneakers have been featured in other films, including He Got Game (1998), White House Down (2013), Uncle Drew (2018), and Spider-Man: Into the Spider-Verse (2018), and Spider-Man: Across the Spider-Verse (2023) and the documentaries Unbanned: The Legend of AJ1 (2018), One Man and His Shoes (2020), and "Episode V" of The Last Dance (2020).

=== Looney Tunes and Space Jam ===
On January 26, 1992, Jordan Brand debuted a commercial during Super Bowl XXVI which showed Bugs Bunny enlisting the help of Michael Jordan to outsmart a bullying rival team using cartoon gags. A second ad premiered in 1993 featuring Bugs and Jordan facing off against Marvin the Martian. The ads inspired Jordan's agent, David Falk, to pitch a film starring Jordan and the Looney Tunes characters. The pitch resulted in Space Jam (1996), a commercial success which grossed over $230 million at the box office and generated over $1 billion in merchandise sales. The success of the advertising campaign and the film contributed to the popularity of Looney Tunes and other cartoon characters as motifs in street fashion through the 1990s and 2000s. A sequel to the film, Space Jam: A New Legacy, was released in 2021, with LeBron James in the lead role.

=== Air ===
Air is an American biographical sports drama film directed by Ben Affleck. The film is based on true events about the origin of Air Jordan, when Sonny Vaccaro, a Nike employee, seeks to strike a business deal with rookie player Jordan. It stars Matt Damon as Vaccaro.

=== Like Mike ===
Like Mike is an American sports comedy film released in 2002. It stars a teenage orphan who gains basketball abilities when he wears sneakers inscribed by Michael Jordan. Upon gaining these powers he is offered a chance to play in the NBA.

== Sponsorships ==
In 1997, Air Jordan selected the first three collegiate sponsorships for the Jordan Brand: Cincinnati Bearcats, St. John's Red Storm, and North Carolina A&T Aggies. North Carolina A&T, a Historically Black College and University (HBCU), ended its sponsorship in 2003 when it signed with Russell Athletic. Since then, Jordan Brand partnered with Howard University Athletics, another HBCU, in 2022 for all their programs except the men's and women's golf teams, which are already sponsored by Stephen Curry's Curry Brand.

Starting in 2016, Air Jordan became the sole equipment provider for the Michigan Wolverines football team. This marked the brand's first venture into a sport besides basketball. As of 2023, Air Jordan is also the equipment provider for the North Carolina Tar Heels, Oklahoma Sooners, Florida Gators, and UCLA Bruins football programs.

In 2018, the Jordan Brand sponsored an association football (soccer) club for the first time in its history, when French club Paris Saint-Germain F.C. displayed the Jumpman logo on their third kits, worn in the 2018–19 UEFA Champions League.

In 2023, the Jordan Brand signed AL 2022 MVP Aaron Judge to an endorsement deal.

The Jordan Brand also sponsors 23XI Racing, which is co-owned by Michael Jordan in the No. 45 Toyota Camry driven by Tyler Reddick in the NASCAR Cup Series.

=== American football ===
==== NCAA college football teams ====
- University of Florida
- Howard University
- University of Michigan
- University of North Carolina at Chapel Hill
- University of Oklahoma
- University of California, Los Angeles

==== NFL players ====
- Jalen Hurts
- Dak Prescott
- Davante Adams
- Stefon Diggs
- Jarvis Landry
- Chase Claypool
- Sterling Shepard
- Kyle Pitts
- Melvin Ingram
- Bobby Wagner
- Devin White
- Dont'a Hightower
- Stephon Gilmore
- Jamal Adams
- Tyrann Mathieu
- Deebo Samuel
- Bryce Young
- Patrick Surtain II

NFL coaches

- Sean Payton

=== Association Football ===
==== Club teams ====
- Paris Saint-Germain

==== Prizeplaying teams ====
- Sidemen FC

=== Auto racing ===
==== NASCAR teams ====
- 23XI Racing

==== NASCAR drivers ====
- Kurt Busch
- Denny Hamlin
- Tyler Reddick

=== Baseball ===
==== MLB players ====
- Mookie Betts
- Jazz Chisholm Jr.
- Vladimir Guerrero Jr.
- Aaron Hicks
- Aaron Judge
- Derek Jeter
- Manny Machado
- Yadier Molina
- CC Sabathia
- Taijuan Walker
- Elly de la Cruz

=== Basketball ===
==== National teams ====
- France
- Slovenia
- Japan

==== Club teams ====
- DUC

==== NBA Official Statement ====
- National Basketball Association ("Statement" edition, NBA All-Star Game and Charlotte Hornets uniforms only)

==== NCAA college basketball teams ====
- University of Cincinnati
- University of Florida
- Georgetown University
- University of Houston
- Howard University
- Marquette University
- University of Michigan
- University of North Carolina
- University of Oklahoma
- San Diego State University
- University of California, Los Angeles
- University of California, Berkeley

==== High school teams ====
- Father Henry Carr Catholic Secondary School
- Langston Hughes High School
- Chaminade College Prep

==== Other teams ====
- Ateneo de Manila University (Philippine college)

==== NBA players ====
- Bam Adebayo
- Carmelo Anthony
- Ray Allen
- Paolo Banchero
- Mike Bibby
- Bismack Biyombo
- Mike Conley Jr.
- Luka Dončić
- Andre Drummond
- Blake Griffin
- Rui Hachimura
- Jaime Jaquez Jr.
- Victor Oladipo
- Bradley Beal
- Jabari Parker
- Chris Paul
- Otto Porter Jr.
- Jayson Tatum
- Moe Wagner
- Kemba Walker
- Russell Westbrook
- Zion Williamson
- Trae Young
- Cody Zeller

==== WNBA players ====
- Jordin Canada
- Te'a Cooper
- Crystal Dangerfield
- Stefanie Dolson
- Chelsea Dungee
- Asia Durr
- Dana Evans
- Dearica Hamby
- Isabelle Harrison
- Arella Guirantes
- Maya Moore
- Kia Nurse
- Aerial Powers
- Satou Sabally

=== Boxing ===
- Andre Ward
- Gennady Golovkin
- Roy Jones Jr.

=== Profesional Wrestling ===
- Roman Reigns

== Philanthropy ==
The Jordan Brand partners with the UNCF and others to fund the higher education of underprivileged youth.

The Jordan Brand also focuses on philanthropy with many large donations throughout the years to communities, athletes, and schools. The brand pledges to help with pressing issues in black communities through grants to the communities focusing on economic justice, education, social justice, and Narrative changes to the youth.

== See also ==
- Flu Game shoes
- List of basketball shoe brands
- Nike Air Max
- Nike Blazers
