= The Jordan Rules (book) =

1991 book by Sam Smith

- Author: Sam Smith
- Language: English
- Subject: 1990–91 Chicago Bulls season
- Genre: Nonfiction
- Publisher: Simon & Schuster
- Publication date: November 13, 1991
- Pages: 378
- ISBN: 0671744917

The Jordan Rules: The Inside Story of a Turbulent Season with Michael Jordan and the Chicago Bulls is a 1991 book by Sam Smith, chronicling the Chicago Bulls' 1990–91 championship season. The book takes its name from the "Jordan Rules" strategies used by the Detroit Pistons at the time to limit Michael Jordan's effectiveness.

== Background ==
When Smith initially proposed the idea of writing a book about a Chicago Bulls' season to potential publishers, there was no interest in it. Smith states that he got "90% rejection letters" due to a notion that though Jordan was a great player, he had not won anything important and that the Bulls were irrelevant. After more failed attempts to sell the book on his own, he then hired an agent and was able to find one to publish his book.

== Reception ==
The Jordan Rules was released on November 13, 1991 and became a New York Times bestseller, selling about 200,000 copies by 1995.

The book generated controversy for its sometimes unflattering depiction of Michael Jordan and its discussions of infighting within the team. Among other things, it claims that Jordan once punched Will Perdue and deliberately threw hard-to-catch passes to Bill Cartwright to expose Cartwright's deficiencies. Bulls players largely criticized the book upon its release. Jordan said, "I'm going to laugh at it and keep moving. We as a team know what the truths are." His teammate Stacey King remarked, "I think this is going to be one of the best fictional stories since Mother Goose. It's sick."

Defending himself, Smith wrote, "This book is about basketball and what happens within a team and a league that draws the attention of millions. It's an attempt to allow people to look behind those closed curtains of sport. And find what? Human beings with everyday emotions trying to do their highly visible jobs as well as they can and confront the obstacles of their relationships and their very lucrative, very public profession."

In 1995, Smith wrote another book about Jordan and the Bulls, called Second Coming: The Strange Odyssey of Michael Jordan: From Courtside to Home Plate and Back Again.
