= Sam Smith (sportswriter) =

American sportswriter (born 1948)

Sam Smith (born January 24, 1948) is an NBA writer for the Chicago Bulls website bulls.com. He is the author of multiple articles and books, including The New York Times bestseller, The Jordan Rules.

== Career ==
Sam was born on January 24, 1948, in Brooklyn, New York. Smith attended James Madison High School in Brooklyn and Pace University in New York City, graduating with a bachelor's degree in accounting in 1970. He worked two years on the auditing staff of Arthur Young & Co. and then earned a master's degree in journalism from Ball State University. He is in the Journalism Hall of Fame at Ball State.

He was a staff and investigative reporter for the Fort Wayne News-Sentinel and congressional reporter and managing editor for States News Service in Washington, D.C. He then became press secretary to Connecticut U.S. Senator Lowell Weicker. He left Weicker's staff to join the Chicago Tribune in November 1979.

Smith started at the Tribune as a political/general assignment writer, writing on the city news and national staffs, the business department, and Sunday magazine, before moving to sports full-time in 1983. He was a sports feature writer and NBA basketball writer until becoming full-time Bulls/NBA writer in 1987. He is the author or co-author of several books, including The New York Times best seller, The Jordan Rules. He also has been a columnist for the Sporting News, ESPN.com, NBC.com, HoopsHype.com, Inside Sports magazine and NBA publications in China and Japan. He appears frequently on radio and TV, including The Tony Kornheiser Show. He received the lifetime achievement award from the Pro Basketball Writers Association and the Curt Gowdy Media Award from the Naismith Basketball Hall of Fame.

== Books and articles ==
Smith wrote The Jordan Rules and Second Coming: The Strange Odyssey of Michael Jordan from Courtside to Home Plate and Back Again (or simply Second Coming). He also is co-author of the basketball book, The Perfect Team, and the Total Basketball Encyclopedia.

== Personal life ==
Smith has been married to Kathleen since 1976 and has two children, Connor and Hannah-Li, and lives in Geneva, Illinois. His grandfather Samuel Pritzker was an Orthodox Jewish rabbi from Ukraine who emigrated to the U.S. from Holovanivsk on August 13, 1925, with his wife and two children, including Smith's mother Betty.
