= The Shot (Bulls–Cavaliers) =

1989 basketball shot by Michael Jordan

Game 5 of the 1989 Eastern Conference First Round
- Photo of The Shot
Chicago Bulls	Cleveland Cavaliers
101	100
Head coach: Doug Collins	Head coach: Lenny Wilkens
	1	2	3	4	Total
Chicago Bulls	24	22	23	32	101
Cleveland Cavaliers	28	20	27	25	100
- Date: May 7, 1989
- Venue: Richfield Coliseum, Richfield Township, Ohio
- Referees: Hugh Evans, Jack Madden, Jake O'Donnell
- Attendance: 20,273

The Shot was a game-winning jumpshot by Michael Jordan and the Chicago Bulls during a 1989 playoff game against the Cleveland Cavaliers of the National Basketball Association (NBA). It took place on May 7, 1989, at Richfield Coliseum in Richfield Township, Ohio, during the deciding Game 5 of the best-of-five Eastern Conference First Round series between the Bulls and Cavaliers. With the Cavaliers leading the game by one point with three seconds left, Bulls player Michael Jordan received an inbound pass and made a buzzer-beater shot to give the Bulls a 101–100 win and clinch a series victory. The play capped off a final minute in which there were six lead changes. Jordan finished the game with 44 points. The Shot is considered to be one of his greatest clutch moments, and the game itself is regarded as a classic. Following the First Round, the Bulls defeated the New York Knicks in the Conference Semifinals in six games, but lost to the eventual champion Detroit Pistons in the Conference Finals in six games.

== Background ==
This series was a rematch of the previous season's Eastern Conference First Round series, which the Bulls won 3–2. However, in 1989, Cleveland swept all six regular-season games against Chicago, including a 90–84 victory in the final regular-season game in which they rested their four best players (Ron Harper, Mark Price, Brad Daugherty and Larry Nance). The Cavaliers had a 57–25 regular season record, tied with the Los Angeles Lakers for the second-best record in the league behind the Detroit Pistons. The Bulls' regular season record was 47–35 which, placing fifth in their division. Cleveland were the third seed in the Eastern Conference and the Chicago were the sixth seed, a reversal of the previous year's playoff seeding.

Given both these factors, the Bulls' playoff victory was considered a major upset. In retrospect, The Shot symbolized the beginning of the ascent of the Jordan-led Chicago Bulls. It was the first of many game-winning shots that Jordan made in his playoff career. On Game 4 of the 1993 Eastern Conference Semifinals, Jordan made another series-winning buzzer-beater on the same end of the court in the same building, to give the Bulls their fourth playoff series win over the Cavaliers, this series being a four-game sweep.

== The Play ==
Michael Jordan made a jump shot with 6 seconds left to give the Bulls a 99–98 lead. After Cleveland called a timeout, Craig Ehlo inbounded the ball to Larry Nance, who gave the ball back to Ehlo, who scored on a driving layup to give Cleveland a 100–99 lead with 3 seconds left. Chicago then called timeout. Jordan was double-teamed by Ehlo and Nance on the inbounds. Jordan first moved to his right, pushing Nance away, then cut left to get open and receive the inbound pass from Brad Sellers. Drifting to his left, Jordan made a jump shot at the foul line hanging in the air over the defending Ehlo who leaped to block the shot as time expired, giving the Bulls a 101–100 victory.

== Lasting image ==
The lasting image of the moment is Jordan's wild, emphatic celebration: a leap into the air and multiple fist pumps as Ehlo fell to the ground in despair a short distance away. This scene has become part of many fans' recollection of The Shot, but it was not shown to viewers of the televised game (which was broadcast on CBS with Dick Stockton and Hubie Brown as well as sideline reporter James Brown calling the action). CBS never aired this replay during the game telecast, nor was Jordan's celebration caught by the sideline pressbox camera used for most game action. Instead, fans saw the celebration of Bulls head coach Doug Collins, who ran around Bulls assistant coach Phil Jackson and into the arms of his team.

Jordan's leap was recreated for the 2006 television commercial "Second Generation".

Jim Durham's call of "The Shot" was used on the opening billboard of the NBA on NBC's revival throughout the 1990–91 NBA season. This was the first buzzer beater to occur in a winner-take-all playoff game. A game-winning shot like this would not happen again until 2019, when the Toronto Raptors' Kawhi Leonard scored a Game 7 shot which bounced off the rim four times before falling.

== Commentary ==
=== Bulls' Radio Network ===
Jim Durham: The inbounds pass comes in to Jordan. Here's Michael at the foul line, the shot on Ehlo... (overlapping Kerr) GOOD! Bulls win!
Johnny Kerr: GOOD! THE BULLS WIN IT! THEY WIN IT!
Durham: They upset the Cleveland Cavaliers! Michael Jordan hits it at the foul line! 101–100! 20,273 in stunned silence here in the Coliseum. Michael Jordan with 44 points in a game hit the shot over Craig Ehlo. What tremendous heroics we have had in Game 5. From both teams, what a spectacular series this has been. In my days in the NBA, 16 years, this is the greatest series I've ever seen!

=== CBS ===
Dick Stockton: Sellers has Jordan. Jordan with 2 seconds to go, puts it up and scores! At the buzzer! Michael Jordan has won it for Chicago! Michael Jordan hit the basket at the buzzer as a disconsolate Lenny Wilkens leaves the floor. And for the second time today, the visiting team has won a deciding game in an opening round series. And the Chicago Bulls will move on to play the New York Knicks in a best-of-7.

=== Cavaliers Radio Network ===
Joe Tait: He looks. He looks. He gets to Jordan. Jordan to the circle, puts the shot in the air, GOOD! The game's over! And the Bulls have won. Jordan beat 'em at the buzzer with a jump shot in the circle and Chicago has knocked off the Cavs 101–100.

== See also ==
- Cleveland sports curse
- Bulls–Cavaliers rivalry
