= List of career achievements by Michael Jordan =

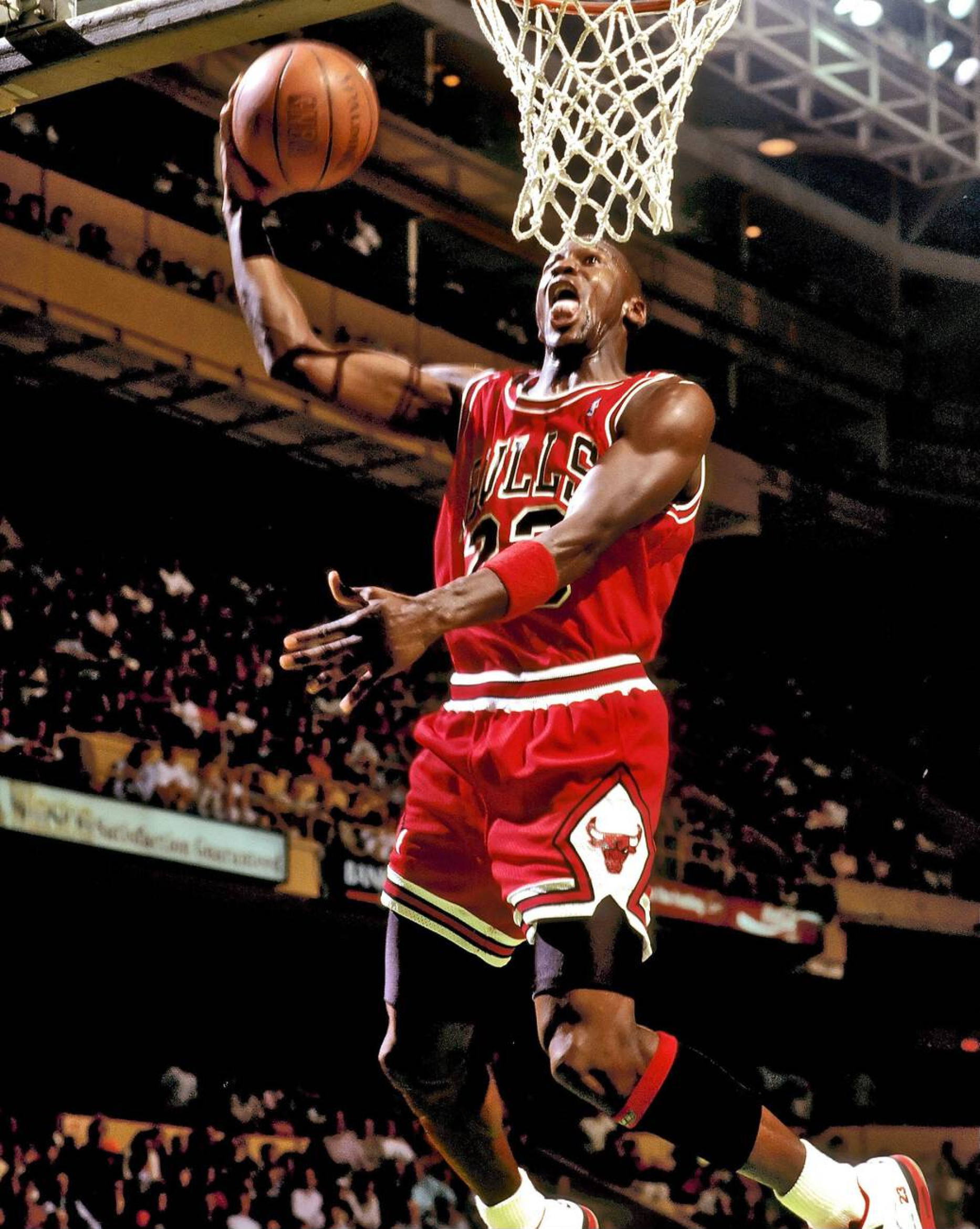
Jordan goes to the basket for a slam dunk in 1987.

This page details statistics, awards, records, and other achievements pertaining to Michael Jordan.

== College statistics ==
The three-point line did not exist during Michael Jordan's freshman and junior seasons in North Carolina in the NCAA. During his sophomore season, the three-point line was tested within ACC play. Many other conferences also tested with the line during this season, but again, only within their respective conference competition.

=== Averages ===
Year	Team	GP	GS	MIN	FG%	3P%	FT%	REB	AST	STL	BLK	PTS
1981–82	North Carolina	34	32	31.7	.534	–	.722	4.4	1.8	1.2	.2	13.5
1982–83	North Carolina	36	36	30.9	.535	.447	.737	5.5	1.6	2.2	.8	20.0
1983–84	North Carolina	31	30	29.5	.551	–	.779	5.3	2.1	1.6	1.1	19.6
Career		101	98	30.8	.540	.447	.748	5.0	1.8	1.7	.7	17.7

=== Totals ===
Year	Team	GP	MIN	FGM	FGA	3PM	3PA	FTM	FTA	REB	AST	TOV	STL	BLK	PF	PTS
1981–82	North Carolina	34	1079	191	358	–	–	78	108	149	61	57	41	8	91	460
1982–83	North Carolina	36	1113	282	527	34	76	123	167	197	56	76	78	28	110	721
1983–84	North Carolina	31	915	247	448	–	–	113	145	163	64	67	50	35	70	607
Career		101	3,107	720	1,333	34	76	314	420	509	181	200	169	71	271	1,788

== NBA career statistics ==
†	Denotes seasons in which Jordan won an NBA championship
	Led the league
**Bold**	Denotes career highs

GP	Games played	GS	Games started	W-L	Games won-Games lost	MIN	Minutes per game
FG%	Field-goal percentage	3P%	3-point field-goal percentage	FT%	Free-throw percentage	OFF	Offensive rebounds per game
DEF	Defensive rebounds per game	REB	Total rebounds per game	AST	Assists per game	STL	Steals per game
BLK	Blocks per game	TOV	Turnovers per game	PF	Personal fouls per game	PTS	Points per game

=== Averages ===
Season	Age	Team	GP	GS	MIN	FG%	3P%	FT%	OFF	DEF	REB	AST	STL	BLK	TOV	PF	PTS
1984–85	21–22	Chicago	**82**	**82**	38.3	.515	.173	.845	**2.0**	4.5	6.5	5.9	2.39	.84	3.55	3.5	28.2
1985–86	22–23	Chicago	18	7	25.1	.457	.167	.840	1.3	2.3	3.6	2.9	2.06	1.17	2.50	2.6	22.7
1986–87	23–24	Chicago	**82**	**82**	40.0	.482	.182	**.857**	2.0	3.2	5.2	4.6	2.88	1.52	3.32	2.9	**37.1**
1987–88	24–25	Chicago	**82**	**82**	**40.4**	.535	.132	.841	1.7	3.8	5.5	5.9	**3.16**	**1.60**	3.07	3.3	35.0
1988–89	25–26	Chicago	81	81	40.2	.538	.276	.850	1.8	**6.2**	**8.0**	**8.0**	2.89	.80	3.58	3.0	32.5
1989–90	26–27	Chicago	**82**	**82**	39.0	.526	.376	.848	1.7	5.1	6.9	6.3	2.77	.66	3.01	2.9	33.6
1990–91†	27–28	Chicago	**82**	**82**	37.0	**.539**	.312	.851	1.4	4.6	6.0	5.5	2.72	1.01	2.46	2.8	31.5
1991–92†	28–29	Chicago	80	80	38.8	.519	.270	.832	1.1	5.3	6.4	6.1	2.28	.94	2.50	2.5	30.1
1992–93†	29–30	Chicago	78	78	39.3	.495	.352	.837	1.7	5.0	6.7	5.5	2.83	.78	2.65	2.4	32.6
1994–95	32	Chicago	17	17	39.3	.411	**.500**	.801	1.5	5.4	6.9	5.3	1.76	.76	2.06	2.8	26.9
1995–96†	32–33	Chicago	**82**	**82**	37.7	.495	.427	.834	1.8	4.8	6.6	4.3	2.20	.51	2.40	2.4	30.4
1996–97†	33–34	Chicago	**82**	**82**	37.9	.486	.374	.833	1.4	4.5	5.9	4.3	1.71	.54	**2.02**	1.9	29.6
1997–98†	34–35	Chicago	**82**	**82**	38.8	.465	.238	.784	1.6	4.2	5.8	3.5	1.72	.55	2.26	**1.8**	28.7
2001–02	38–39	Washington	60	53	34.9	.416	.189	.790	.8	4.8	5.7	5.2	1.42	.43	2.70	2.0	22.9
2002–03	39–40	Washington	**82**	67	37.0	.445	.291	.821	.9	5.2	6.1	3.8	1.50	.48	2.11	2.1	20.0
Career			1,072	1,039	38.3	.497	.327	.835	1.6	4.7	6.3	5.3	2.35	.82	2.73	2.6	30.1
First retirement			667	656	38.7	.516	.301	.846	1.7	4.6	6.3	5.9	2.72	1.03	3.00	2.9	32.3
Second retirement			930	919	38.6	.505	.332	.838	1.7	4.6	6.3	5.4	2.48	.89	2.78	2.7	31.5
Playoffs			179	179	41.8	.487	.332	.828	1.7	4.7	6.4	5.7	2.10	.88	3.05	3.0	33.4
All-Star			13	13	29.4	.472	.273	.750	1.7	3.0	4.7	4.2	2.85	.46	3.23	2.4	20.2

=== Totals ===
Season	Team	GP	GS	W-L	MIN	FGM	FGA	3PM	3PA	FTM	FTA	OFF	DEF	REB	AST	STL	BLK	TOV	PF	PTS
1984–85	Chicago	**82**	**82**	38–44	3,144	837	1,625	9	52	630	746	**167**	367	534	481	196	69	**291**	**285**	2,313
1985–86	Chicago	18	7	9–9	451	150	328	3	18	105	125	23	41	64	53	37	21	45	46	408
1986–87	Chicago	**82**	**82**	40–42	3,281	**1,098**	**2,279**	12	66	**833**	**972**	166	264	430	377	236	125	272	237	**3,041**
1987–88	Chicago	**82**	**82**	50–32	**3,311**	1,069	1,998	7	53	723	860	139	310	449	485	**259**	**131**	252	270	2,868
1988–89	Chicago	81	81	47–34	3,255	966	1,795	27	98	674	793	149	**503**	**652**	**650**	234	65	290	247	2,633
1989–90	Chicago	**82**	**82**	55–27	3,197	1,034	1,964	92	245	593	699	143	422	565	519	227	54	247	241	2,753
1990–91†	Chicago	**82**	**82**	61–21	3,034	990	1,837	29	93	571	671	118	374	492	453	223	83	202	229	2,580
1991–92†	Chicago	80	80	67–13	3,102	943	1,818	27	100	491	590	91	420	511	489	182	75	200	201	2,404
1992–93†	Chicago	78	78	56–22	3,067	992	2,003	81	230	476	569	135	387	522	428	221	61	207	188	2,541
1994–95	Chicago	17	17	13–4	668	166	404	16	32	109	136	25	92	117	90	30	13	35	47	457
1995–96†	Chicago	**82**	**82**	**72–10**	3,090	916	1,850	**111**	260	548	657	148	395	543	352	180	42	197	195	2,491
1996–97†	Chicago	**82**	**82**	69–13	3,106	920	1,892	**111**	**297**	480	576	113	369	482	352	140	44	166	156	2,431
1997–98†	Chicago	**82**	**82**	62–20	3,181	881	1,893	30	126	565	721	130	345	475	283	141	45	185	151	2,357
2001–02	Washington	60	53	30–30	2,093	551	1,324	10	53	263	333	50	289	339	310	85	26	162	119	1,375
2002–03	Washington	**82**	67	37–45	3,031	679	1,527	16	55	266	324	71	426	497	311	123	39	173	171	1,640
Career		1,072	1,039	706–366	41,011	12,192	24,537	581	1,778	7,327	8,772	1,668	5,004	6,672	5,633	2,514	893	2,924	2,783	32,292
First retirement		667	656	423–244	25,842	8,079	15,647	287	955	5,096	6,025	1,131	3,088	4,219	3,935	1,815	684	2,006	1,944	21,541
Second retirement		930	919	639–291	35,887	10,962	21,686	555	1,670	6,798	8,115	1,547	4,289	5,836	5,012	2,306	828	2,589	2,493	29,277
Playoffs		179	179	119–60	7,474	2,188	4,497	148	446	1,463	1,766	305	847	1,152	1,022	376	158	546	541	5,987
All-Star		13	13	6–7	382	110	233	3	11	39	52	22	39	61	54	37	6	42	31	262

Source: basketball-reference.com and nba.com

=== Playoffs ===
Round	Opponent	Games	MIN	FG%	FT%	REB	AST	STL	BLK	PTS
1985 First Round	Milwaukee Bucks	4	42.8	.436	.828	5.8	8.5	2.8	1.0	29.3
1986 First Round	Boston Celtics	3	45.0	.505	.872	6.3	5.7	2.3	1.3	43.7
1987 First Round	Boston Celtics	3	42.7	.417	.897	7.0	6.0	2.0	**2.3**	35.7
1988 First Round	Cleveland Cavaliers	5	43.4	.559	.918	5.4	4.8	2.8	1.6	**45.2**
1988 Conference Semifinals	Detroit Pistons	5	42.0	.491	.789	8.8	4.6	2.0	.6	27.4
1989 First Round	Cleveland Cavaliers	5	42.0	.518	.821	5.8	8.2	3.0	.4	39.8
1989 Conference Semifinals	New York Knicks	6	41.5	.550	.819	9.5	8.3	2.5	1.3	35.7
1989 Conference Finals	Detroit Pistons	6	43.2	.460	.759	5.5	6.5	2.0	.5	29.7
1990 First Round	Milwaukee Bucks	4	41.5	.539	.766	8.0	7.0	2.5	1.0	36.8
1990 Conference Semifinals	Philadelphia 76ers	5	42.4	.548	.850	6.6	7.4	**4.0**	1.2	43.0
1990 Conference Finals	Detroit Pistons	**7**	42.3	.467	.875	7.1	6.3	2.1	.6	32.1
1991 First Round	New York Knicks	3	37.7	.525	.957	4.7	6.0	2.7	.7	29.0
1991 Conference Semifinals	Philadelphia 76ers	5	39.2	.489	.795	8.0	7.8	1.8	1.4	33.4
1991 Conference Finals	Detroit Pistons	4	40.0	.535	.833	5.3	7.0	2.3	1.8	29.8
1991 NBA Finals	Los Angeles Lakers	5	44.0	.558	.848	6.6	**11.4**	2.8	1.4	31.2
1992 First Round	Miami Heat	3	39.7	**.609**	.906	9.7	6.7	3.0	1.0	45.0
1992 Conference Semifinals	New York Knicks	**7**	43.1	.477	.823	5.7	4.3	1.4	1.1	31.3
1992 Conference Finals	Cleveland Cavaliers	6	40.8	.440	.911	6.5	6.3	2.5	.5	31.7
1992 NBA Finals	Portland Trail Blazers	6	42.3	.526	.891	4.8	6.5	1.7	.3	35.8
1993 First Round	Atlanta Hawks	3	35.7	.526	.882	6.7	4.3	1.7	1.7	34.3
1993 Conference Semifinals	Cleveland Cavaliers	4	38.3	.490	.800	5.0	5.3	2.3	.5	31.0
1993 Conference Finals	New York Knicks	6	41.5	.400	.868	6.2	7.0	2.5	1.0	32.2
1993 NBA Finals	Phoenix Suns	6	**45.7**	.508	.694	8.5	6.3	1.7	.7	41.0
1995 First Round	Charlotte Hornets	4	41.5	.495	.833	6.5	5.8	2.0	.8	32.3
1995 Conference Semifinals	Orlando Magic	6	42.3	.477	.796	6.5	3.7	2.5	1.8	31.0
1996 First Round	Miami Heat	3	34.3	.516	.778	3.7	2.7	1.7	.3	30.0
1996 Conference Semifinals	New York Knicks	5	43.0	.442	.878	4.8	4.4	1.8	.2	36.0
1996 Conference Finals	Orlando Magic	4	40.8	.520	.750	5.5	4.8	2.3	.8	29.5
1996 NBA Finals	Seattle SuperSonics	6	42.0	.415	.836	5.3	4.2	1.7	.2	27.3
1997 First Round	Washington Bullets	3	43.0	.571	**1.000**	5.7	5.3	1.3	.3	37.3
1997 Conference Semifinals	Atlanta Hawks	5	42.0	.454	.821	**10.2**	5.2	2.0	1.4	26.6
1997 Conference Finals	Miami Heat	5	41.8	.387	.860	8.0	2.6	1.8	.8	30.2
1997 NBA Finals	Utah Jazz	6	42.7	.456	.764	7.0	6.0	1.2	.8	32.3
1998 First Round	New Jersey Nets	3	43.3	.529	.778	5.0	2.7	1.3	1.0	36.3
1998 Conference Semifinals	Charlotte Hornets	5	41.0	.465	.853	5.6	4.6	1.0	.4	29.6
1998 Conference Finals	Indiana Pacers	**7**	41.0	.467	.811	5.7	4.1	1.7	.4	31.7
1998 NBA Finals	Utah Jazz	6	41.7	.427	.814	4.0	2.3	1.8	.7	33.5

Source: basketball-reference.com

== Media rankings ==
The official NBA website states that "By acclamation, Michael Jordan is the greatest basketball player of all time"

- #1 on SLAM Magazine's Top 50 NBA Players of All Time: 1997
- #2 on Sports Illustrated's Top 25 Greatest Athletes of the 20th Century: 1999
- #1 on Sports Illustrated's Top 50 Greatest Athletes of the 20th Century from North Carolina: 1999
- #2 on the Associated Press' Top 100 Athletes of the 20th Century: 1999
- #1 on the Associated Press' Greatest Basketball Players of the Century: 1999
- #1 on ESPN's Top 100 Greatest North American Athletes of the 20th Century: 1999
- #1 on SLAM Magazine's Top 50 NBA Players of All Time: 2009
- #1 on SLAM Magazine's Top 500 Greatest NBA Players of All Time: 2011
- #1 on ESPN's Top 20 Athletes 1995–2015: 2015
- #1 on Sports Illustrated's Top 50 Greatest NBA Players of All Time: 2016
- #1 on SLAM Magazine's Top 100 NBA Players of All Time: 2018
- #1 on Bleacher Report's Top 50 Greatest Athletes of All Time: 2018
- #1 on ESPN's Top 74 NBA Players of All Time: 2020
- #1 on The Athletic's Top 75 NBA Players of All Time: 2022
- #1 on Complex's Top 30 Best NBA Players of All Time: 2023
- #1 on Yahoo Sports' Greatest Living Men's Basketball Players: 2024
- #1 on ClutchPoints' Top 25 Greatest Male Athletes of All Time: 2024
- #1 on GiveMeSport's Top 50 Greatest Athletes of All Time: 2024
- #1 on ClutchPoints' Top 50 Best NBA Players of All Time: 2024
- #1 on The Sporting News' Top 10 NBA Players of All Time: 2024
- #1 on Bleacher Report's Top 100 NBA Players of All Time: 2025

== Amateur achievements & awards ==
=== Middle School ===
- Dixie Youth Baseball Association "Mr. Baseball": 1975
- Little League Baseball State Championship: 1975

- Little League MVP

- Trask Middle School Outstanding Athlete: 1977

=== High School ===
- University of North Carolina Basketball Camp MVP: 1980
- Five-Star Basketball Camp Pittsburgh: 1980 (Note: Reportedly won more than 7 different total awards at this camp.)

- Co-Most Outstanding Player
- Session 1 MVP (Note: Played well enough to earn MVP honors in session 2 as well, but rules at the time prevented a single player from winning more than one MVP.)
- 2× All-Star Game MVP
- Orange-White Classic MVP
- One-on-one Champion
- Five-on-five Champion
- Scoring Champion

- Averaged a Triple-double his senior season: 1981 (26.8 pts, 11.6 reb, 10.1 ast)
- McDonald's Capital Classic All-Star Game: 1981
- McDonald's All-American: 1981
- Parade All-American First Team: 1981
- Knoxville News Sentinel's #4 Ranked High School Player: 1981
- Selected in 2012 as one of the Top 35 Greatest McDonald's All-Americans of All Time
- Selected in 2013 as one of the NCHSAA's "Top 100 Male Athletes of All Time"
- #23 retired by Emsley A. Laney High School
- USA Today's Top 25 Greatest High School Players of All Time Honorable Mention: 2024

=== College ===
- NCAA National Championship – University of North Carolina: 1981–82
  - Helms Foundation National Champion: 1981–1982
- 1982 ACC Tournament Champions
- 3× ACC Regular Season Champions: 1981–82, 1982–83, 1983–84 (Undefeated)
- 2× National College Player of the Year: 1982–1983, 1983–1984 (Consensus)
  - 2× The Sporting News College Player of the Year: 1982–1983, 1983–1984
  - Naismith College Player of the Year: 1983–1984
  - John R. Wooden Award: 1983–1984
  - AP College Basketball Player of the Year: 1983–1984
  - NABC Player of the Year: 1983-1984
  - UPI College Basketball Player of the Year: 1983-1984
  - USBWA College Player of the Year: 1983–1984
  - Adolph F. Rupp Trophy: 1983–1984
- 2× Consensus First Team All-American: 1983, 1984
  - 2× AP First Team All-American: 1983, 1984
  - 2× The Sporting News First Team All-American: 1983, 1984
  - 2× UPI First Team All-American: 1983, 1984
  - 2× NABC First Team All-American: 1983, 1984
  - 2× USBWA First Team All-American: 1983, 1984
- ACC Athlete of the Year: 1984
- ACC Men's Basketball Player of the Year: 1984
- ACC Rookie of the Year: 1981–1982
- 2× All-ACC First Team: 1982–1983, 1983–1984
- All-ACC Tournament First Team: 1981–1982
- 2× All-ACC Tournament Second Team: 1982–1983, 1983–1984
- All-NCAA Tournament Team: 1982
- NCAA Tournament East Regional Team: 1983
- Freshman All-American Team: 1982
- ACC Points Leader: 1982–1983
- ACC Scoring Leader: 1983–1984
- 1980s NCAA Tournament All-Decade Team
- 1980s NCAA Tournament Team of the Decade: North Carolina
- NCAA Tournament All-Time Team
- ACC 50th Anniversary Team
- #23 honored and retired by the North Carolina Tar Heels: 1994
- Named The Greatest Male ACC Athlete of All Time in 2003
- Selected as one of the Top 15 Greatest Players in NCAA Tournament History in 2012
- #12 on Bleacher Report's Top 50 Greatest College Basketball Players of All Time: 2018
- #18 on ClutchPoints' Top 25 Greatest College Basketball Players of All Time: 2023
- ESPN College Basketball Greatest of All Time Bracket Champion: 2020

- Round of 64: (2) Michael Jordan def. (15) Nancy Lieberman
- Round of 32: (2) Michael Jordan def. (10) Tim Duncan
- Sweet 16: (2) Michael Jordan def. (11) David Robinson
- Elite Eight: (2) Michael Jordan def. (12) Stephen Curry
- Final Four: (2) Michael Jordan def. (3) Magic Johnson
- Finals: (2) Michael Jordan def. (3) Larry Bird

== Professional achievements ==
Basketball Triple Crown

=== Hall of Fame Inductions ===
- Madison Square Garden Walk of Fame: 1992
- Two-time Naismith Memorial Basketball Hall of Fame inductee:
  - Class of 2009 – individual
  - Class of 2010 – as a member of the "Dream Team"
- United States Olympic Hall of Fame – Class of 2009 (as a member of the "Dream Team")
- North Carolina Sports Hall of Fame – Class of 2010
- Two-time FIBA Hall of Fame inductee:

- Class of 2015 – individual
- Class of 2017 – as a member of the "Dream Team"

- United States Athletics Hall of Fame – Inaugural Class of 2023

=== NBA achievements ===
- 6× NBA champion: 1991, 1992, 1993, 1996, 1997, 1998
- 5× NBA Most Valuable Player: 1987–88, 1990–91, 1991–92, 1995–96, 1997–98

- 3× Runner-up: 1986–1987, 1988–1989, 1996–1997

- 6× NBA Finals Most Valuable Player: 1991, 1992, 1993, 1996, 1997, 1998
- 10× Scoring leader: 1986–87, 1987–88, 1988–89, 1989–90, 1990–91, 1991–92, 1992–93, 1995–96, 1996–97, 1997–98

- 11× Points leader: 1984–1985, 1986–1987, 1987–1988, 1988–1989, 1989–1990, 1990–1991, 1991–1992, 1992–1993, 1995–1996, 1996–1997, 1997–1998

- NBA Defensive Player of the Year: 1987–88

- Runner-up: 1992-1993

- NBA Rookie of the Year: 1984–85
- 14× NBA All-Star: 1985, 1986 (selected but injured), 1987, 1988, 1989, 1990, 1991, 1992, 1993, 1996, 1997, 1998, 2002, 2003
- 3× NBA All-Star Game Most Valuable Player: 1988, 1996, 1998
- 2× NBA Slam Dunk Contest champion: 1987, 1988

- Runner-up: 1985

- 3× Steals leader: 1987–88, 1989–90, 1992–93

- 2× Runner-up: 1986–1987, 1988–1989

- 2× Minutes leader: 1987–88, 1988–89

- 3× Minutes Played leader: 1986–1987, 1987–1988, 1988–1989

- NBA free throw scoring leaders: (1987)
- 9× Win Shares leader: 1986–1987, 1987–1988, 1988–1989, 1989–1990, 1990–1991, 1991–1992, 1992–1993, 1995–1996, 1996–1997

- 2× Runner-up: 1984–1985, 1997–1998

- 7× PER leader: 1986–1987, 1987–1988, 1988–1989, 1989–1990, 1990–1991, 1991–1992, 1992–1993

- 3× Runner-up: 1984–1985, 1995–1996, 1996–1997

- 9× Box Plus/Minus leader: 1986–1987, 1987–1988, 1988–1989, 1989–1990, 1990–1991, 1991–1992, 1992–1993, 1995–1996, 1996–1997

- Runner-up: 1984–1985

- 2× IBM Award winner: 1985, 1989
- 11× All-NBA selection:

- 10× First Team: 1987, 1988, 1989, 1990, 1991, 1992, 1993, 1996, 1997, 1998
- Second Team: 1985

- 9× All-Defensive selection:

- 9× First Team: 1988, 1989, 1990, 1991, 1992, 1993, 1996, 1997, 1998

- NBA All-Rookie selection:

- First Team: 1985

- McDonald's Championship – 1997
- McDonald's Championship MVP – 1997
- NBA 1980s All-Decade First Team
- NBA 1990s All-Decade First Team
- Selected in 1996 as one of the "50 Greatest Players in NBA History"
- Selected in 2021 to the NBA 75th Anniversary Team
- Selected in 2006 as The Greatest Moment in Playoff History: "Jordan jolts Jazz in Game 6"

- #10: "God disguised as Michael Jordan"
- #17: "MJ flu game"
- #20: "Michael Jordan's game-winner over Craig Ehlo/Cavs"
- #22: "Michael Jordan's 3-pointers vs. Blazers"
- #41: "Michael Jordan switches hands vs. Lakers"

- Selected in 1996 as member of two of the "Top 10 Teams in NBA History"

- 1991–92 Chicago Bulls (67–15; .817)
- 1995–96 Chicago Bulls (72–10; .878)

- 25× NBA Player of the Week
- 16× NBA Player of the Month
- 3× NBA Rookie of the Month: 1984-1985 (November, January, March)
- NBA 30,000 Career Points Trophy: 2002
- #23 retired by the Chicago Bulls
- #23 retired by the Miami Heat
- Chicago Bulls Ring of Honor: 2024
- The NBA MVP Trophy was renamed the Michael Jordan Trophy in 2022

=== United States National Team ===
- Undefeated U.S. National Team Record: 30-0 (Note: One of only 11 players with an undefeated record, minimum 15 victories.)
- 3× USA Basketball Male Athlete of the Year: 1983, 1984 (with Sam Perkins), 1992 (as a part of the 1992 Olympic Team)
- Pan American Games Gold Medal: 1983
- Pan American Games Most Outstanding Player: 1983
- 2× Olympic Gold Medalist: 1984, 1992
- FIBA Americas Championship Gold Medal: 1992
- Selected in 2023 as one of the "75 Greatest Athletes in Pan American Games History"

== Media awards & honors ==
- 2× Seagram's Basketball Player of the Year: 1985, 1987
- Gordon's Gin Black Athlete of the Year: 1987
- L'Équipe Champion of Champions: 1992
- TWS Sportsman of the Year: 1993
- 2× Milliyet Sports Award World Athlete of the Year: 1994, 2002
- United States Sports Academy Male Athlete of the Year: 1996
- 3× Victor Awards NBA Player of the Year: 1996, 1997, 1998 (Note: Little to no information regarding award winners pre-1996.)
- Marca Legend Award: 1997 (Note: Inaugural award winner.)
- Naismith Good Sportsmanship Award: 1998
- Jackie Robinson Sports Award: 1999
- World Sports Awards Athlete of the Century (Basketball): 1999
- Morning Consult Greatest Athlete of All Time: 2023
- LIFE Magazine's The Greatest of All Time: 2024
- Nine Publishing Greatest Athlete of All Time: 2025
- Mirror Review Greatest Athlete of All Time: 2025
- The Harris Poll

- 2× Greatest Athlete of All Time: 2009, 2015
- Greatest Basketball Player of All Time: 2015

- SLAM Magazine

- SLAM Magazine's The Greatest of All Time
- SLAM Magazine's Greatest Team of All Time: 1995–1996 Bulls

- Sport Magazine

- Sport Magazine's Greatest Basketball Player of the Half-Century (1946–1996): 1996
- Sport Magazine's Greatest Athlete of the Last 50 Years (1946–1996): 1996

- Sports Illustrated

- Sports Illustrated Sportsman of the Year: 1991
- 9× Sports Illustrated Best NBA Player: 1988, 1989, 1990, 1991, 1992, 1993, 1996, 1997, 1998
- Sports Illustrated Athlete of the Decade: 1990s
- Sports Illustrated Most Dominant NBA Player of the Decade: 1990s
- Sports Illustrated Basketball Athlete of the Century: 1999

- The Associated Press

- 3× AP Athlete of the Year: 1991, 1992, 1993
- AP Athlete of the Decade: 1990s
- AP Basketball Player of the Century: 1999
- AP 1980s All-Decade First Team
- AP 1990s All-Decade First Team

- The Sporting News

- The Sporting News Athlete of the Year: 1991
- 7× The Sporting News Most Valuable Player: 1987–88, 1988–89, 1990–91, 1991–92, 1995–96, 1996–97, 1997–98
- The Sporting News Rookie of the Year: 1985
- The Sporting News 1980s All-Decade First Team
- The Sporting News 1990s All-Decade First Team
- The Sporting News Basketball Player of the Decade: 1990s
- The Sporting News Team of the Decade: Chicago Bulls 1990s

- ESPN

- 6× ESPN American Athlete of the Year: 1991, 1992, 1993, 1996, 1997, 1998
- ESPN Athlete of the Decade: 1990s
- ESPN SportsCentury North American Athlete of the Century: 1999
- 5× The ESPN Sports Poll Favorite Male Athlete: 1995, 1996, 1997, 1998, 1999

- ESPY Awards

- Best Male Athlete: 1993
  - Nominee: 1997, 1998, 1999
- 4× Best NBA Player: 1993, 1997, 1998, 1999
- Best Comeback Athlete: 1996
- Dramatic Individual Performance of the Year: 1998 (Note: Michael Jordan fights off the flu in Game 5 of the NBA Finals.)
- NBA Play of the Year: 1993 (Note: Michael Jordan's flip shot vs Dallas.)

- ESPY Decade Awards

- Male Athlete of the Decade: 1990s
- Professional Basketball Player of the Decade: 1990s
- Play of the Decade: 1990s (Note: His reverse hands layup against the Lakers (1991).)
- Professional Team of the Decade: Chicago Bulls 1990s

- Basketball Digest Magazine

- 7× Basketball Digest Player of the Year: 1987–1988, 1988–1989, 1990–1991, 1991–1992, 1995–1996, 1996–1997, 1997–1998
- Basketball Digest Rookie of the Year: 1984–1985

- Bleacher Report

- Bleacher Report 1980s All-Decade First Team
- Bleacher Report 1990s All-Decade First Team

- SB Nation

- SB Nation 1980s All-Decade First Team
- SB Nation 1990s All-Decade First Team

- FanSided

- FanSided 1980s All-Decade Team
- FanSided 1990s All-Decade Team

- Nickelodeon Kids' Choice Awards

- 9× Favorite Male Athlete: 1987, 1990, 1991, 1992, 1994, 1996, 1998, 1999, 2002
- 4× Favorite Sports Team: Chicago Bulls – 1992, 1995, 1998, 1999
- Hall of Fame Award: 1994

- 6× NBA 2K Cover Athlete: 2K11, 2K12, 2K16 (MJ Special Edition), 2K23 (MJ and Championship Editions), NBA 2K Mobile

- NBA 2K 1980s All-Stars Team (highest rated player)
- NBA 2K 1990s All-Stars Team (highest rated player)

- NBA Live Legend All-Stars Teams

- 1980s All-Stars Team (starter)
- 1990s All-Stars Team (starter)

- Yahoo Sports Best Teams Ever Bracket: NBA Edition Champion

- Round 1: (3) '96 Bulls def. (14) '65 Celtics
- Round 2: (3) '96 Bulls def. (11) '01 Lakers
- Final Four: (3) '96 Bulls def. (2) '86 Celtics
- Championship: (3) '96 Bulls def. (1) '17 Warriors

== Off-court achievements & awards ==
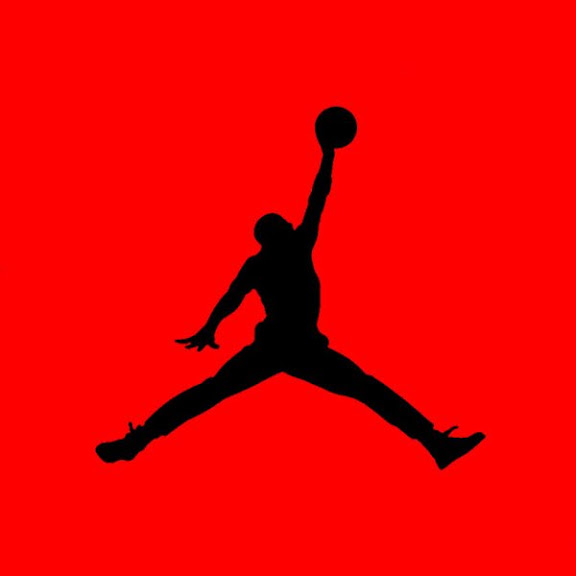
Nike's iconic Jumpman logo

=== Notable Achievements ===
- 5% royalty of Jordan Brand sales: 1984

- Air Jordan: 1984 (Note: First shoe released in 1985.)
- Jumpman logo: 1984 (Note: The Air Jordan III, released in February 1988, was the first Jordan signature sneaker to feature the Jumpman logo.)

- Co-owner of Michael Jordan Nissan in Durham, North Carolina: 1990
- Founder and owner of Michael Jordan's Steak House: 1997
- Former minority owner of the Washington Wizards: 1999–2001

- Former President of Basketball Operations: 2000–2001

- Founder and owner of Michael Jordan Motorsports: 2004–2014 (dissolved)
- Minority owner of the Charlotte Hornets: 2023

- Former majority owner of the Charlotte Hornets: 2010–2023

- First NBA player to become a billionaire: 2014
- Minority owner of the Miami Marlins: 2018
- Co-founder and co-owner of Cincoro Tequila: 2019
- Minority owner of DraftKings: 2020

- Special adviser: 2020

- Founder and co-owner of 23XI Racing: 2020
- Owner of the Grove XXIII, a private golf club in Hobe Sound, Florida: 2023
- First athlete to appear on the Forbes 400: 2023
- Sportico's highest-paid athlete of all-time
- Novant Health Michael Jordan Family Medical Clinic – four locations in North Carolina

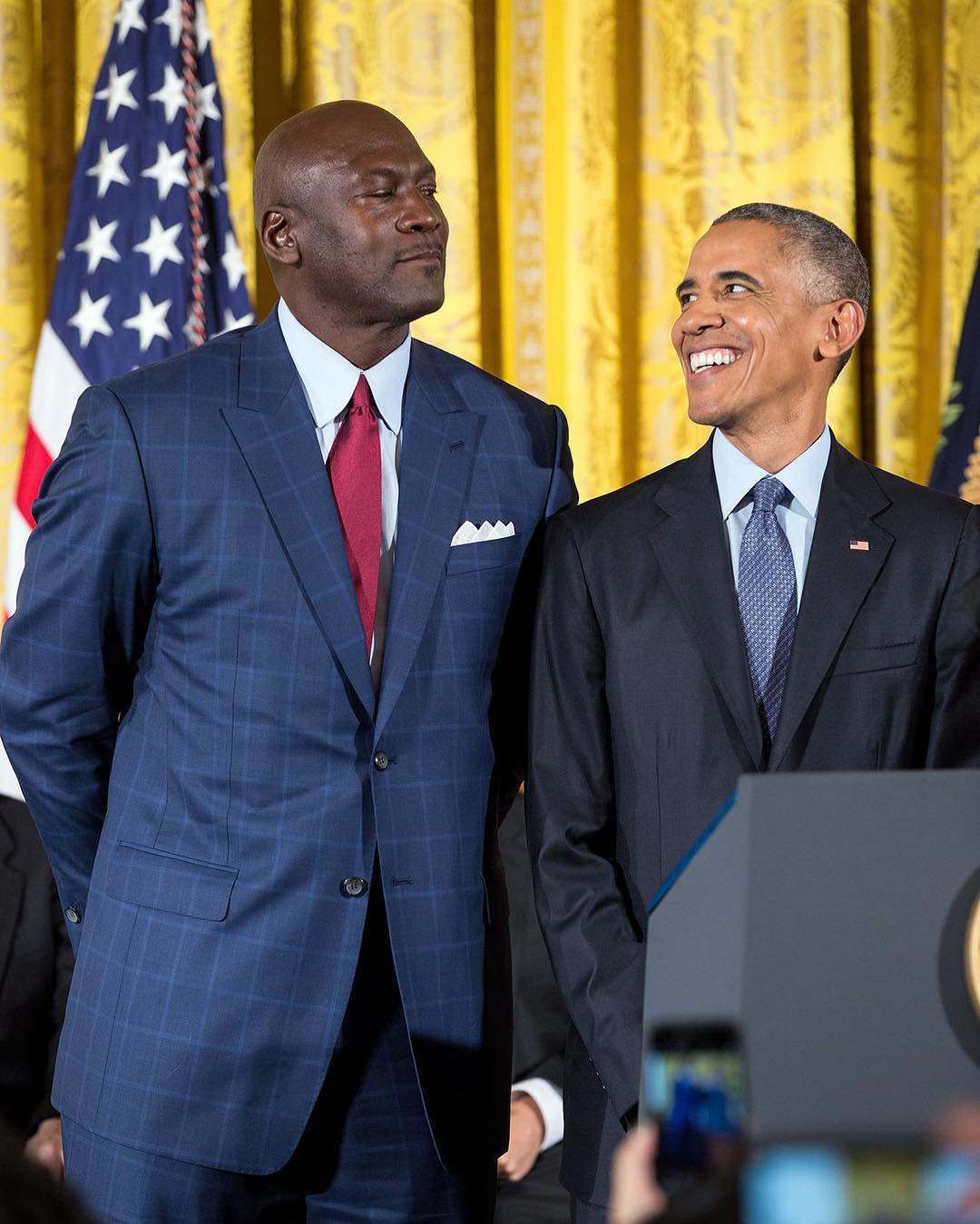
Michael Jordan receiving the Presidential Medal of Freedom from President Barack Obama at the White House

=== Awards & Honors ===
- Order of the Long Leaf Pine: 1985
- Boys & Girls Clubs of America Alumni Hall of Fame: 1988
- Boys Town's Father Flanagan Award for Service to Youth: 1990
- Academy of Achievement Golden Plate Award: 1990
- TIME Magazine's 10 Most Influential Athletes of the Century: 1999
- #14 on Cigar Aficionado's Top 100 Cigar Smokers of the Twentieth Century: 1999
- Jackie Robinson Foundation ROBIE Award: 2000
- Essence Award for Career and Charity Contributions: 2000
- Michael Jordan Celebrity Golf Invitational Champion: 2006
- Citizen of the Carolinas Award: 2008
- AMA Superstock Championship: 2008 (as owner)
- Make-A-Wish Chief Wish Ambassador: 2008
- U.S. Presidents Cup Team Assistant Captain: 2009
- U.S. Ryder Cup Team Advisor: 2012
- AMA Supersport East Title: 2013 (as owner)
- Charlotte Business Journal's Business Person of the Year: 2014
- Presidential Medal of Freedom: 2016
- World's Highest-Paid Athlete Ever by Forbes: 2017
- The One Club Creative Hall of Fame: 2022
- 2× Forbes 400: 2023, 2024

=== NASCAR Cup Series ===
==== As Owner ====
- YellaWood 500 Champion (2021)
- 2× AdventHealth 400 Champion (2022, 2026)
- 2× Hollywood Casino 400 Champion (2022, 2023)
- 2× DuraMAX Texas Grand Prix Champion (2023, 2026)
- 2× The Duel at Daytona Champion (2024, 2025)
- GEICO 500 (2024)
- FireKeepers Casino 400 Champion (2024)
- Straight Talk Wireless 400 Champion (2024)
- NASCAR Cup Series Regular Season Champion (2024)
- 2× Brickyard 400 Champion (2025, 2026)
- Daytona 500 Champion (2026)
- Autotrader 400 Champion (2026)
- Goodyear 400 Champion (2026)

=== Fishing Tournaments ===
==== Catch 23 ====
- (gold) The Buccaneer Cup Sailfish Release Tournament in Palm Beach, Florida: 2021
- (gold) Daily Winner at The White Marlin Open in Ocean City, Maryland – Dolphin category: August 4, 2021
- (silver) The Quest for the Crest Sailfish Series in South Florida: 2022
- (gold) The White Marlin Roundup in Abaco, Bahamas – Heaviest Dolphin: 2022
- Jupiter Billfish Classic in Jupiter, Florida: 2023
  - (gold) Overall Release Points
  - (gold) Live Bait Points
- (bronze) The MidAtlantic Tournament in Cape May and Ocean City – White marlin category: 2023
- (gold) The Shootout Tournament in Abaco, Bahamas: 2024
  - The Ed Pang Blue Marlin Trophy: Catch 23
  - Top Angler: Michael Jordan
- (gold) The White Marlin Open in Ocean City, Maryland – Dolphin category: 2024
- (bronze) The MidAtlantic Tournament in Cape May and Ocean City – Tuna category: 2024
- (silver) The White Marlin Open in Ocean City, Maryland – White marlin category: 2025

=== The Last Dance ===
- Sports Emmy Award for Outstanding Sports Promotional Announcement: 2020 (Note: Award presented in 2021 due to the COVID-19 pandemic.)
- AAFCA Awards Best Documentary: 2020
- Creative Arts Emmy Awards

- Outstanding Documentary or Nonfiction Series: 2020
- Outstanding Directing for a Documentary/Nonfiction Nominee: 2020
- Outstanding Picture Editing for a Nonfiction Program Nominee: 2020

- TCA Awards Outstanding Achievement in News and Information: 2020
- NAACP Image Award for Outstanding Documentary: 2020
- Producers Guild of America Award for Best Non-Fiction Television: 2020
- Golden Reel Award for Outstanding Achievement in Sound Editing – Non-Theatrical Documentary Nominee: 2020
- American Cinema Editors Award for Best Edited Documentary (Non-Theatrical): 2020
- Cinema Eye Honors

- Outstanding Broadcast Series Nominee: 2020
- Outstanding Editing in a Broadcast Film or Series Nominee: 2020

== Tributes & statues ==
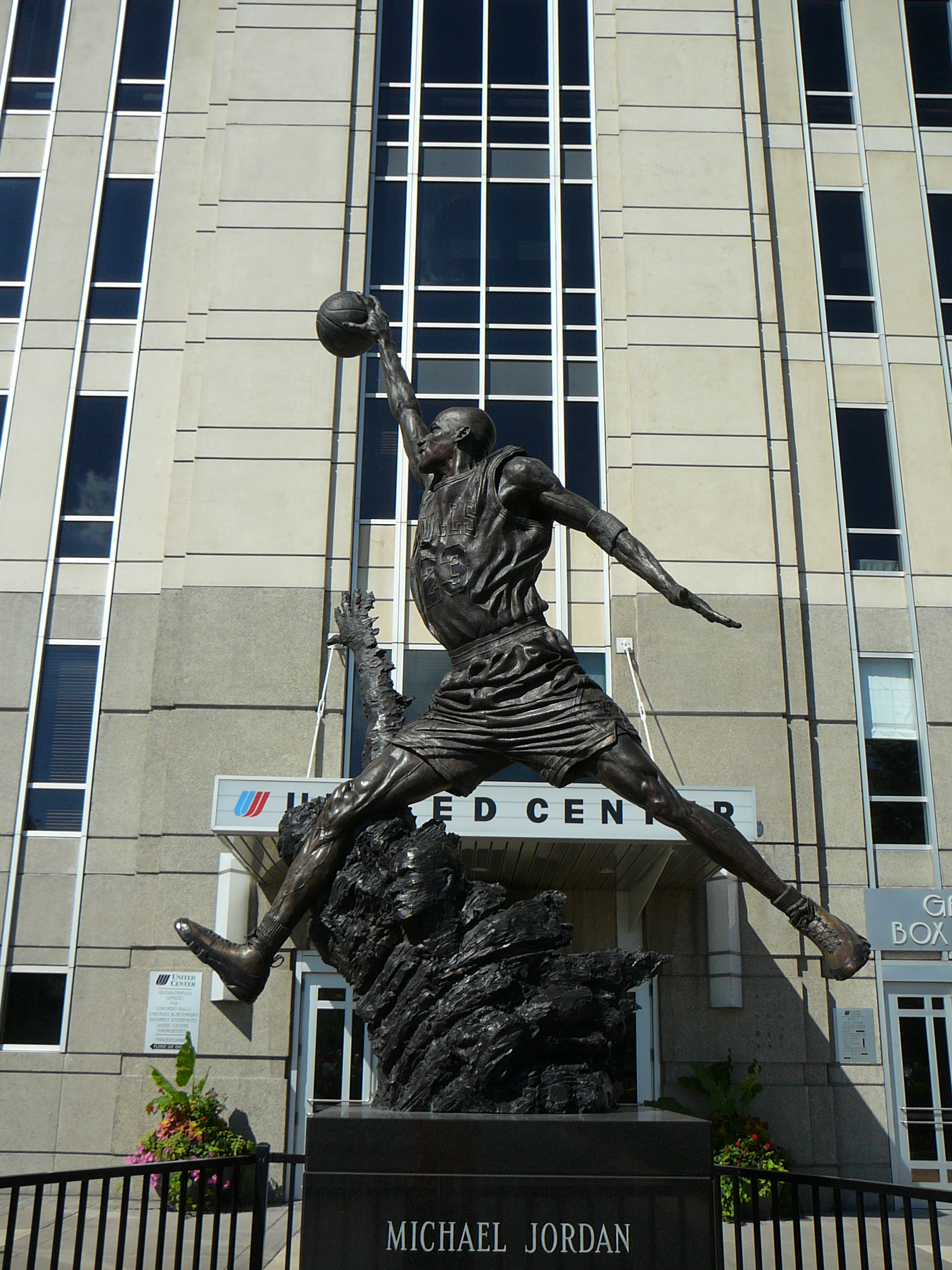
Statue of Michael Jordan outside the United Center

- Cape Fear Museum's Michael Jordan: Achieving Success exhibit: 1980s

- Michael Jordan Discovery Gallery

- The Michael Jordan Building at Nike World Headquarters: 1990
- A 7.1 mile section of Interstate 40 in New Hanover County, North Carolina was renamed Michael Jordan Freeway: 1991
- Michael Jordan's Restaurant in Chicago, Illinois: 1993–1999 (closed)
- Statue of Michael Jordan outside the United Center: 1994
- A section of Madison Street in Chicago, Illinois was renamed Michael Jordan Drive: 1994
- The gym at Emsley A. Laney High School in Wilmington, North Carolina was renamed the Michael J. Jordan Gymnasium: 1995

- The Michael Jordan Sports Complex

- The United States Sports Academy Mr. Basketball sculpture was named in honor of Michael Jordan: 2009
- The Michael Jordan statue at the National Museum of African American History and Culture in Washington, D.C.: 2016
- The Michael Jordan Trophy: 2022
- Michael Jordan's wax figure is displayed prominently at several Madame Tussauds locations, including London, New York and Las Vegas

== Statistical achievements ==
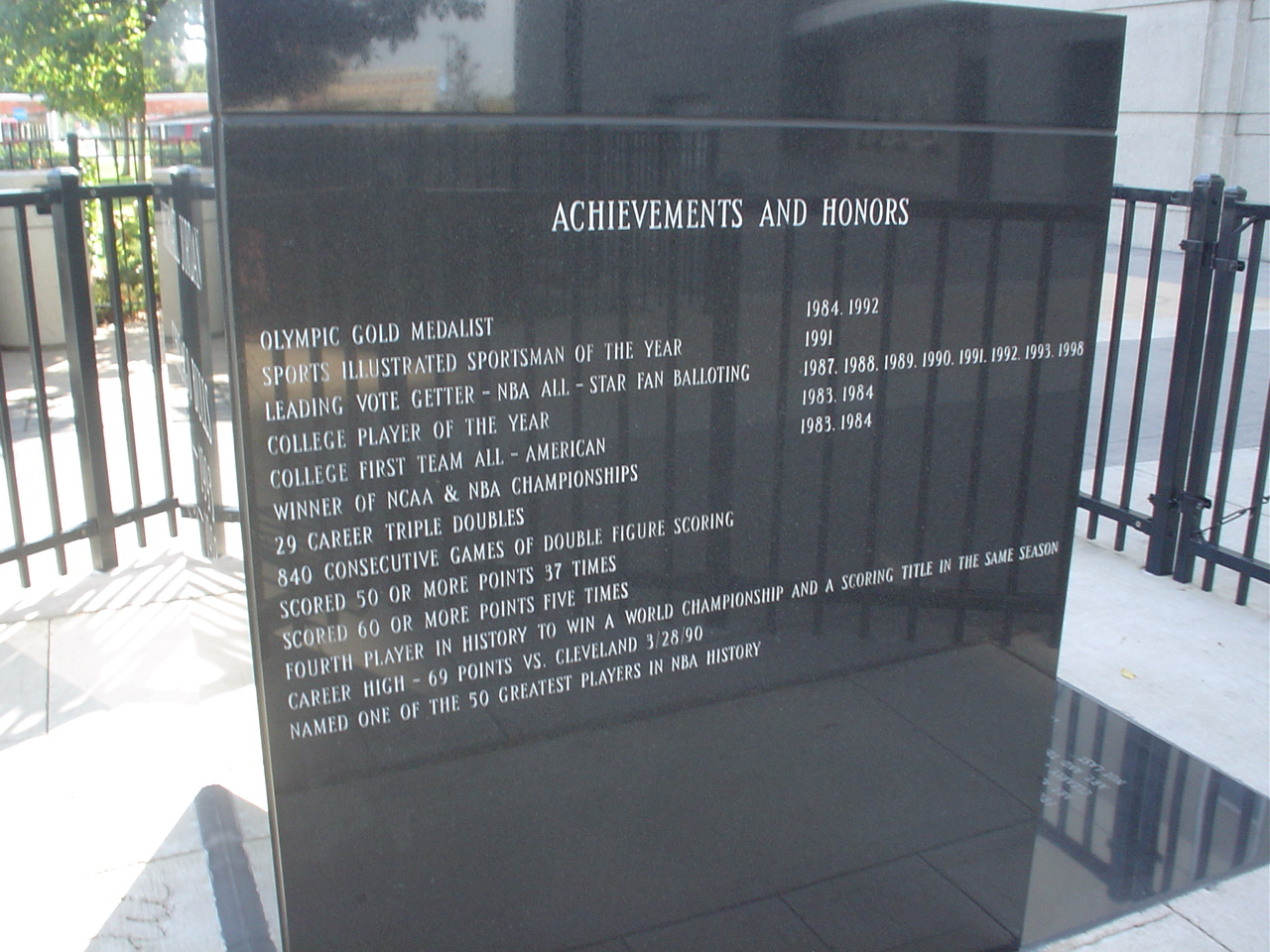
Plaque chronicling Jordan's career achievements at the United Center.

Career: 1,264 games (1,072 regular season, 179 postseason, 13 All-Star)

- Scored 0–1 points in 0 games
- Scored 2–9 points in 15 games (13 regular season, 2 All-Star)
- Scored 10+ points in 1,249 games (1,059 regular season, 179 postseason, 11 All-Star)
- Scored 20+ points in 1,106 games (926 regular season, 173 postseason, 7 All-Star)
- Scored 30+ points in 673 games [NBA record] (1st all time) (562 regular season, 109 postseason, 2 All-Star)
- Scored 35+ points in 410 games [NBA record] (1st all time) (333 regular season, 75 postseason, 2 All-Star)
- Scored 40+ points in 212 games (2nd all time) (173 regular season, 38 postseason, 1 All-Star)
- Scored 50+ points in 39 games (2nd all time) (31 regular season, 8 postseason)
- Scored 60+ points in 5 games (3rd all time) (4 regular season, 1 postseason)
- Recorded 28 game-winning shots (21 regular season, 7 postseason)
- Recorded 31 Triple-doubles (28 regular season, 2 postseason, 1 All-Star) (19th all time)
- Recorded 241 Double-doubles (201 regular season, 39 postseason, 1 All-Star)
- 11-time regular season leader, total points (1985, '87–'93, '96–'98)
- 10-time regular season leader, scoring average ('86–'93, '95–'98)
- 3-time regular season leader, steals ('88, '90, '93)

== University of North Carolina Tar Heels records ==
- Most points scored by a sophomore: 721 (in 36 games; 1982–83)

- During this season, Jordan set his UNC career high with 39 points against Georgia Tech on January 29, 1983. His previous career high was against Duke on January 22, 1983 (32 points).

== NBA records and former records ==
=== Regular season ===
==== Scoring ====
Seasons leading the league in scoring: 10 (1986–87–1992–93, 1995–96–1997–98)

Consecutive seasons leading the league in scoring: 7 (1986–87–1992–93)

- Also holds second (see below)
- Tied Wilt Chamberlain

Seasons leading the league in total points: 11 (1984–85, 1986–87–1992–93, 1995–96–1997–98)

- In his rookie year (1984–85), Jordan led the league in points scored, but was third in scoring average behind Bernard King and Larry Bird.

First scoring champion with at least 100 three-pointers 1995–96 – 1996–97

Highest scoring average, points per game, career: 30.12 (32,292/1,072)

Seasons averaging 30 or more points per game: 8 (1986–87–1992–93, 1995–96)

Games scoring 30 or more points, career: 562

Consecutive games scoring 10 or more points: 866, March 25, 1986 to December 26, 2001

- 840 with the Chicago Bulls; 26 with the Washington Wizards
- Jordan failed to score in double digits only once as a Bull (8 points in only 16 minutes of play on March 22, 1986 vs. the Cleveland Cavaliers, his fifth game upon returning from a broken foot).
- Broken by LeBron James in 2018

Consecutive points scored in a game: 23, vs. Atlanta Hawks, April 16, 1987

- Occurred during the last 6:33 of second quarter (17 points) and first 2:12 of third quarter (6 points)
- Broken since then by several players
- Jordan scored 61 points and set or tied several league records in this game
- Jordan also scored 18 consecutive points, all in the fourth quarter, vs. the New York Knicks on November 21, 1986

Seasons scoring 2,000 or more points: 11 (1984–85, 1986–87–1992–93, 1995–96–1997–98)

- Broken by Karl Malone in 2000

Oldest player in NBA history to lead the league in scoring: 35 years, 61 days (1997–98)

Oldest player in NBA history to score 50 points in a game: 38 years, 315 days (51 points, vs. New Orleans Hornets, December 29, 2001)

- Broken by Jamal Crawford in 2019

Oldest player in NBA history to score 40 points in a game: 40 years, 4 days (43 points, vs. New Jersey Nets, February 21, 2003)

- Jordan is also the only player to score 40+ at age 40 or older.
- This has since been achieved by LeBron James in 2025 at scoring 40+ at age 40 or older.
- In his final season, Jordan scored 40+ 3 times, 30+ 9 times and 20+ 42 times.

Fewest games played to reach 31,000 points: 1,011 games, achieved vs. Portland Trail Blazers, December 10, 2002

Fewest games played to reach 32,000 points: 1,059 games, achieved at Golden State Warriors, March 23, 2003

Outscoring the opposing starting five: Jordan outscored the entire opposing starting five 58–54, Chicago Bulls vs. New Jersey Nets, February 26, 1987

- Other players have accomplished this.

==== Field goals ====
Seasons leading the league in field goals made: 10 (1986–87–1992–93, 1995–96–1997–98)

Consecutive seasons leading the league in field goals made: 7 (1986–87–1992–93)

- Also holds second (see below)

Seasons leading the league in field goal attempts: 9 (1986–87–1987–88, 1989–90–1992–93, 1995–96–1997–98)

==== Free throws ====
Free throws made, half: 20, second half, at Miami Heat, December 30, 1992 (since tied by Devin Booker)

- Also holds third (see below)

Free throws made, quarter: 14, twice

14, fourth quarter, at Utah Jazz, November 15, 1989
14, fourth quarter, at Miami Heat, December 30, 1992
- Broken by Vince Carter on December 23, 2005
- Jordan also made 13 free throws in the second quarter of his last regular season game as a Bull, vs. the New York Knicks on April 18, 1998.

Free throw attempts, half: 23, second half, at Miami Heat, December 30, 1992

Free throw attempts, quarter: 16, fourth quarter, at Miami Heat, December 30, 1992

- Broken by Ben Wallace on December 11, 2005

Consecutive free throws made in a game: 19, vs. New Jersey Nets, February 26, 1987

- Shared with others including Bob Pettit on November 22, 1961
- Broken by Dominique Wilkins on December 8, 1992 (23)

==== Steals ====
Seasons leading the league in steals: 3 (1987–88, 1989–90, 1992–93)

- Broken by Chris Paul

Steals, half: 8, first half, at Boston Celtics, November 9, 1988

Games with 8 or more steals, career: 11

==== Personal fouls ====
Personal fouls, quarter: 6, fourth quarter, vs. Detroit Pistons, January 31, 1989

=== Playoffs ===
==== Scoring ====
Points, career: 5,987

- Broken by LeBron James in 2017

Highest scoring average, points per game, career: 33.4 (5,987/179)

Games scoring 50 or more points, career: 8

Consecutive games scoring 50 or more points: 2, vs. Cleveland Cavaliers, April 28, 1988 to May 1, 1988

- Jordan is the only player in NBA history to record back-to-back 50-point games in the playoffs, scoring 50 and 55 in Games 1 and 2 against the Cavs.
- He also scored 49 points on April 17, 1986 and 63 on April 20, 1986 in back-to-back games against the Boston Celtics.

Games scoring 45 or more points, career: 23

Games scoring 40 or more points, career: 38

Games scoring 30 or more points, career: 109

Games scoring 20 or more points, career: 173

- Jordan failed to score 20 points only six times in 179 playoff games.

Consecutive games scoring 20 or more points: 60, June 2, 1989 to May 11, 1993

- Also holds fourth (see below)

Consecutive games scoring 10 or more points: 179, April 19, 1985 to June 14, 1998

- Jordan's entire playoff career

Consecutive points scored in a game: 17, during second half (from 73 to 90 points), at New York Knicks, June 2, 1993

- Broken by Ray Allen on June 1, 2001

Points, one postseason: 759 (1992)

Scoring 35 or more points in all games, any playoff series: Twice
5 games, vs. Cleveland Cavaliers, 1988 First Round
5 games, vs. Philadelphia 76ers, 1990 Conference Semifinals

- Joined by Jerry West (6 games, Los Angeles Lakers vs. Baltimore Bullets, 1965) and Bernard King (5 games, New York Knicks vs. Detroit Pistons, 1984)

Scoring 30 or more points in all games, any playoff series: Seven times
3 games, vs. Boston Celtics, 1987 First Round
5 games, vs. Cleveland Cavaliers, 1988 First Round
5 games, vs. Cleveland Cavaliers, 1989 First Round
5 games, vs. Philadelphia 76ers, 1990 Conference Semifinals
3 games, vs. Miami Heat, 1992 First Round
6 games, vs. Phoenix Suns, 1993 NBA Finals
3 games, vs. New Jersey Nets, 1998 First Round

- Joined by Rick Barry, Elgin Baylor, Wilt Chamberlain, Bernard King, Hakeem Olajuwon, Shaquille O'Neal, and Jerry West.

Points, 3-game series: 135, vs. Miami Heat, 1992 First Round (45.0 ppg)

- Also holds second and fourth (see below)

Points, 5-game series: 226, vs. Cleveland Cavaliers, 1988 First Round (45.2 ppg)

- Also holds second and fourth (see below)

Points, game: 63, at Boston Celtics, April 20, 1986 (2 OT)

- Jordan has 5 of the top 10 highest scoring games in NBA playoff history.
- Also holds third and fourth (see below)

Points, two consecutive games: 112, at Boston Celtics, 1986 Eastern Conference First Round, April 17 (49), 20 (63), 1986 (56.0 ppg)

Outscoring the opposing team in a quarter: Jordan outscored the entire opposing team 20–19 in the second quarter of Game 1 of the 1988 Eastern Conference First Round, Chicago Bulls vs. Cleveland Cavaliers, April 28, 1988

- Stephen Curry outscored the entire opposing team 16–15 in the first quarter of Game 1 of the 2016 Western Conference First Round, Golden State Warriors vs. Houston Rockets, April 16, 2016

Most points in three quarters: Jordan scored 54 points in three quarters (17 points in the second, 19 in the third and 18 in the fourth) in Game 3 of the 1992 Eastern Conference First Round, Chicago Bulls at Miami Heat, April 29, 1992

Most points without making the NBA Finals, one postseason: 591, 1989, and 587, 1990

NBA record 5 playoff series averaging at least 40 points per game

1. 1986 First Round vs Celtics – 43.7 ppg on 51 FG%
2. 1988 First Round vs Cavaliers – 45.2 ppg on 56 FG%
3. 1990 Eastern Conference Semifinals vs Sixers – 43.0 ppg on 55 FG%
4. 1992 First Round vs Heat – 45.0 ppg on 61 FG%
5. 1993 Finals vs Suns – 41.0 ppg on 51 FG%
- No other player in NBA history has more than 1 40ppg+ average in a playoff series of any length. Jordan did it 5 times.
- Elgin Baylor 1962 vs the Celtics (40.6 ppg on 43 FG%), Jerry West 1965 vs the Bullets (46.3 ppg on 45 FG%), Rick Barry 1967 vs the 76ers (40.8 ppg on 40 FG%), Bernard King 1984 vs the Pistons (42.6 ppg on 60 FG%) are the only players ever to accomplish this feat.
- Jordan was also the last player in history to do this when he averaged 41.0 ppg in the NBA Finals of 1993 vs the Suns.
- Jordan by himself has 5 of the top 7 highest scoring playoff series displays in NBA history.

==== Field goals ====
Field goals made, 3-game series: 53, vs. Miami Heat, 1992 First Round

- Also holds third (see below)

Field goals made, 5-game series: 86, vs. Philadelphia 76ers, 1990 Conference Semifinals

- Also holds second (see below)

Field goals made, 6-game series: 101, vs. Phoenix Suns, 1993 NBA Finals

Field goals made, game: 24, vs. Cleveland Cavaliers, May 1, 1988

- Also holds third and fourth (see below)

Consecutive field goals made in a game without a miss: 13, vs. Los Angeles Lakers, June 5, 1991

Field goal attempts, career: 4,497

- Broken by Kobe Bryant on May 21, 2012

Field goal attempts, half: 25, first half, vs. Cleveland Cavaliers, May 1, 1988

- Also holds second and third (see below)

==== Three-point field goals ====
Three-point field goals made, half: 6, first half, vs. Portland Trail Blazers, June 3, 1992

- Broken by Vince Carter on May 11, 2001

Three-point field goal attempts, half: 9, first half, vs. Portland Trail Blazers, June 3, 1992

- Broken by John Starks on June 22, 1994

==== Free throws ====
Free throws made, career: 1,463

Free throws made, one postseason: 183 (1989)

- Broken by Dirk Nowitzki in 2006

Free throws made, game (regulation): 23, vs. New York Knicks, May 14, 1989

- Broken by Dirk Nowitzki on May 17, 2011
- Bob Cousy made 30 of 32 free throws in a four-overtime game on March 21, 1953.
- Also holds third (see below)

Free throws made, half: 14, second half, vs. Detroit Pistons, May 28, 1990

- Broken by Magic Johnson on May 8, 1991

Free throws made, quarter: 13, fourth quarter, vs. Detroit Pistons, May 21, 1991

- Tied by Dirk Nowitzki on April 16, 2011
- Also holds third (see below)

Free throw attempts, career: 1,766

- Broken by Shaquille O'Neal

Free throw attempts, one postseason: 229 (1989)

- Broken by Shaquille O'Neal in 1995

Free throw attempts, 4-game series: 58, vs. Milwaukee Bucks, 1985 First Round

- Broken by Shaquille O'Neal in 1999

Free throw attempts, game (regulation): 28, vs. New York Knicks, May 14, 1989

- Broken by Shaquille O'Neal on June 9, 2000
- Also holds fourth (see below)

Free throw attempts, half: 17, second half, vs. New York Knicks, May 14, 1989

- Broken by Magic Johnson on May 8, 1991

Free throw attempts, quarter: 14, fourth quarter, vs. Detroit Pistons, May 21, 1991

- Broken by Shaquille O'Neal on May 20, 2000

==== Steals ====
Steals, career: 376

- Broken by LeBron James in 2017

=== NBA Finals ===
==== Scoring ====
Highest scoring average, points per game, any championship series: 41.0 (246/6), vs. Phoenix Suns, 1993 NBA Finals

Points, 6-game series: 246, vs. Phoenix Suns, 1993 NBA Finals (41.0 ppg)

- Also holds fourth (see below)

Consecutive games scoring 40 or more points: 4, vs. Phoenix Suns, June 11, 1993 to June 18, 1993

Consecutive games scoring 20 or more points: 35, June 2, 1991 to June 14, 1998

- Jordan's entire Finals career

Scoring 30 or more points in all games, any championship series: 6 games, vs. Phoenix Suns, 1993 NBA Finals

- Also achieved by Elgin Baylor (1962), Rick Barry (1967), Hakeem Olajuwon (1995), and Shaquille O'Neal (2000, 2002)

Points, half: 35, first half, vs. Portland Trail Blazers, June 3, 1992

- Also holds second (see below)

==== Field goals ====
Field goals made, 6-game series: 101, vs. Phoenix Suns, 1993 NBA Finals

Field goals made, half: 14, twice
14, first half, vs. Portland Trail Blazers, June 3, 1992
14, first half, vs. Phoenix Suns, June 16, 1993

- Also holds third and fourth (see below)

Consecutive field goals made in a game without a miss: 13, vs. Los Angeles Lakers, June 5, 1991

Field goals made, 5-game series: 63, vs. Los Angeles Lakers, 1991 NBA Finals

- Broken by Allen Iverson in 2001

Field goal attempts, 6-game series: 199, vs. Phoenix Suns, 1993 NBA Finals

==== Three-point field goals ====
Three-point field goals made, career: 42

- Broken by Robert Horry

Three-point field goals made, game: 6, vs. Portland Trail Blazers, June 3, 1992

- Broken by Kenny Smith on June 7, 1995

Three-point field goals made, half: 6, first half, vs. Portland Trail Blazers, June 3, 1992

- Broken by Ray Allen on June 6, 2010

Three-point field goal attempts, game: 10, vs. Portland Trail Blazers, June 3, 1992

- Broken by John Starks on June 22, 1994

Three-point field goal attempts, half: 10, first half, vs. Portland Trail Blazers, June 3, 1992

- Broken by John Starks on June 22, 1994

==== Free throws ====
Free throws made, quarter: 9, second quarter, at Utah Jazz, June 11, 1997

Free throw attempts, half: 15, second half, vs. Utah Jazz, June 4, 1997

- Broken by Shaquille O'Neal on June 9, 2000

Free throw attempts, quarter: 12, fourth quarter, vs. Utah Jazz, June 4, 1997

- Broken by Shaquille O'Neal on June 9, 2000

==== Steals ====
Steals, 5-game series: 14, vs. Los Angeles Lakers, 1991 NBA Finals (2.8 spg)

=== All-Star ===
Points, career: 262

- Broken by Kobe Bryant (290) and then LeBron James (291)

Field goals made, career: 110

- Broken by Kobe Bryant and LeBron James (119)

Field goals made, game: 17, 1988

- Broken by Blake Griffin

Field goal attempts, career: 233

Field goal attempts, game: 27, 2003 (2 OT)

- Broken by Russell Westbrook

Steals, career: 37

Blocked shots, half: 4, 1988

=== Other records ===
==== Regular season ====
NBA All-Defensive First Team selections: 9

Blocked shots by a guard, career: 893.

Blocked shots by a guard, season: 131 (1987–88)

Most seasons all time of 100+ blocks by a guard (x2) 125 blocks (1986–87), 131 blocks (1987–88). Jordan is the only guard in history to have more than 1 season of 100+ blocks.

Most seasons all time of 200+ steals by a guard (x6) (1986–87) to (1990–91) and (1992–93). Tied with Alvin Robertson. Also, the all-time record regardless of position.

Highest Player Efficiency Rating of all time, career: 27.91

Highest Box Plus/Minus of all-time career: 9.22

Most times leading the league in Win Shares, all-time career: 9 times

Most times leading the league in Box Plus/Minus, all-time career: 10 times

Most times leading the league in Value Over Replacement Player (VORP), all-time career: 9 times (Jordan has 6 of the 10 highest VORP seasons ever recorded)

Most times leading the league in PER, all-time career: 7 times

Highest Win Shares / 48 of all-time career: 0.2505

Only rookie in NBA history to lead his team in four statistics (1984–85)

- Jordan led the 1984–85 Chicago Bulls in scoring (28.2 ppg), rebounding (6.5 rpg), assists (5.9 apg) and steals (2.4 spg).
- Jordan again led the Bulls in four statistics in 1987–88, this time leading the team in scoring (35.0 ppg), assists (5.9 apg), steals (3.2 spg) and blocked shots (1.6 bpg).

Second rookie in NBA history to average 20+ points, 5+ rebounds, and 5+ assists (1984–85)

- Oscar Robertson (1960–61), LeBron James (2003–04) and Tyreke Evans (2009–10) have also achieved this.
- Jordan averaged 28.2 points, 6.5 rebounds and 5.9 assists per game. He led all rookies in scoring and steals (2.4 per game).

One of two players in NBA history to score 3,000 points in a season: 3,041 points scored in 82 games played (37.1 ppg) (1986–87)

- Wilt Chamberlain is the only other player to achieve this, a feat he accomplished three times.

First player in NBA history to record 200 steals and 100 blocked shots in a season: 236 steals, 125 blocks (1986–87)

- Hakeem Olajuwon (1988–89) and Scottie Pippen (1989–90) are the only other players to do so.

Only player in NBA history with more than one season of 200 steals and 100 blocked shots: 259 steals, 131 blocks (1987–88)

Only player in NBA history to lead the league in scoring and win Defensive Player of the Year in the same season (1987–88)

- Jordan averaged 35 points per game.

First player in NBA history to win Rookie of the Year, Defensive Player of the Year and Most Valuable Player during his career

- David Robinson is the only other player to achieve this.
- Hakeem Olajuwon won Defensive Player of the Year and Most Valuable Player during his career, but finished second in Rookie of the Year voting to Jordan in 1984–85.

First player in NBA history to lead the league in scoring and win Defensive Player of the Year during his career

- David Robinson is the only other player to achieve this.

Only player in NBA history to lead the league in scoring, win Most Valuable Player, and Defensive Player of the Year in the same season (1987–88)

First player in NBA history to win Most Valuable Player and Defensive Player of the Year in the same season (1987–88)

- Hakeem Olajuwon (1993–94) and Giannis Antetokounmpo (2019–20) are the only other players to achieve this.

First player in NBA history to lead the league both in scoring and steals in the same season (1987–88, 1989–90, 1992–93)

- Allen Iverson is the only other player to do so, and has performed the feat twice.

Fourth player in NBA history to lead the league in scoring and win the NBA championship in the same season

- Jordan is the only player to achieve this more than once; he did this six times (1990–91, 1991–92, 1992–93, 1995–96, 1996–97, 1997–98)

One of three players in history to sweep the Most Valuable Player awards for the regular season, All-Star Game and NBA Finals in the same season (1995–96, 1997–98)

- Willis Reed (1969–70) and Shaquille O'Neal (1999–2000) are the only other players to achieve this; Jordan is the only player to perform the feat twice.

One of three players in history to win an Olympic gold medal both as an amateur and professional (1984, 1992)

- Patrick Ewing and Chris Mullin have also achieved this, playing on the same teams with Jordan.

Sixth player in history to win an Olympic gold medal, NCAA championship and NBA championship

- Clyde Lovellette, Bill Russell, K.C. Jones, Jerry Lucas, Quinn Buckner and Earvin "Magic" Johnson have also achieved this.

Only player in NBA history to win Rookie of the Year (1984–85), Defensive Player of the Year (1987–88), NBA MVP (1987–88, 1990–91, 1991–92, 1995–96, 1997–98), All-Star MVP (1988, 1996, 1998), and Finals MVP (1991, 1992, 1993, 1996, 1997, 1998)

Led the 1995–96 Chicago Bulls to the second-best regular season record in NBA history (72 wins, 10 losses)

- Jordan averaged a league-leading 30.4 ppg
- The 2015–16 Golden State Warriors, who won 73 regular-season games, are the winningest regular season team in NBA history.

Led the 1995–96 Chicago Bulls to the best combined regular season and postseason record in NBA history (87 wins, 13 losses)

==== Playoffs ====
Only player in NBA history to score 15 or more points in all games in his career: 179 games

Outscored 268 of 269 opponents faced in the playoffs on points per game

- Michael Jordan outscored all but one opponent he faced in his playoffs career. The exception was in the 1985 Eastern conference 1st round in Jordan's rookie season when Milwaukee Bucks power forward Terry Cummings outscored Jordan (29.5 ppg to Jordan's 29.3 ppg).

Highest Player Efficiency Rating all time playoffs, career: 28.6

Highest Box Plus/Minus all time, all time playoffs career: 11.14

Only guard in NBA history to lead his team in all 5 categories (points, rebounds, assists, steals, blocks) during a playoff series

- 1989 Eastern Conference Semifinals vs. New York Knicks

Jordan came close to leading all 5 categories in a playoff series on 3 more occasions

- 1991 Eastern Conference Semifinals vs. Philadelphia 76ers, (short 7 rebounds)
- 1993 Eastern Conference Finals vs. New York Knicks, (short 3 rebounds)
- 1997 Eastern Conference Semifinals vs. Atlanta Hawks, (short 2 assists)

Only player in NBA history to average at least 30 points, 6 rebounds, 5 assists, 2 steals in a playoff run (7 times)

- Jordan did this in the 1986, 1987, 1989, and 1990 Playoffs, and in the Bulls' 1991, 1992, and 1993 championship runs

Only player in NBA history to average at least 30 points, 6 rebounds, 6 assists, 2 steals in a playoff run (5 times)

- Jordan did this in the 1987, 1989, and 1990 Playoffs, and in the Bulls' 1991 and 1993 championship runs

Only player in NBA history to average at least 30 points, 6 rebounds, 6 assists in a title run (2 times)

- Jordan did this in the Bulls' 1991 and 1993 championship runs, while also averaging at least 2 steals in both of those runs

Averaged at least 30 points, 6 rebounds, 4 assists, 2 steals in a record 9 different playoff runs

- Jordan did this in each of his 9 playoff appearances from 1986 to 1995 (Jordan was retired during the 1994 Playoffs)
- Tracy McGrady is the only other player to average at least 30 points, 6 rebounds, 4 assists, 2 steals in a playoff run, when he lost in the first round of the 2003 Playoffs.

Only player in NBA history to shoot at least 38% on 3-point field goals in 3 NBA Finals runs (minimum 15 points per game and 1.5 three-point attempts per game)

- Jordan did this in the Bulls' 1991, 1992, and 1993 championship runs under the original 3-point line. He also did it in the 1996 championship run, but with a shorter 3-point line
- Four other players meet this criterion in multiple NBA Finals runs
  - Terry Porter (1990 and 1992)
  - Manu Ginobili (2005 and 2007)
  - Ray Allen (2008 and 2010)
  - Stephen Curry (2015 and 2016)

In the 1997 title run, Jordan led a championship team in all 5 main categories (points, rebounds, assists, steals, blocks) for the last 3 rounds of the 1997 Playoffs

- Hakeem Olajuwon is the only other player to do this, when he led the 1994 Rockets in all 5 main categories for the entire 4-round playoffs
- Jordan and Dennis Rodman tied with 133 rebounds (8.3 rpg) for the last 3 rounds.
- Jordan was 10 rebounds (0.53 rebounds per game) and 1 block (0.05 blocks per game) shy of leading the Bulls in all 5 categories for the entire 4-round playoffs

Only player in NBA history to lead a team to the championship with only one teammate averaging double figures in scoring

- In the Bulls' 1997 playoff run, Scottie Pippen averaged 19 points per game on 42% shooting. All other teammates of Jordan averaged under 8 points per game

==== Finals ====
Most Valuable Player awards: 6 (1991, 1992, 1993, 1996, 1997, 1998)

- Jordan was named MVP in every Finals appearance. He averaged 33.6 points, 6 rebounds and 6 assists per game for his Finals career.

Scoring 20 or more points in all games, career: 35 games

- Jordan and Rick Barry (10 games) are the only players in NBA history to score 20+ in every Finals game.

One of seven players to lead a team in 4 out of 5 categories for an NBA Finals

- Jordan led the 1991 Bulls in points, assists, steals, and blocks.
- The other players to do this are Kareem Abdul-Jabbar (1974), Hakeem Olajuwon (1986), Magic Johnson (1987), Larry Bird (1987), Tim Duncan (2003, 2007), and LeBron James (2013, 2014, 2015, 2016, 2017, and 2018)

==== All-Star ====
Most Valuable Player awards: 3 (1988, 1996, 1998)

- Tied with Bob Pettit and Kobe Bryant, both of whom won 3 outright, and 1 shared.

First player to record a triple-double in All-Star Game history: 14 points, 11 rebounds, 11 assists in 26 minutes (1997)

- LeBron James recorded the second triple-double in All-Star Game history in 2011, with 29 points, 12 rebounds, 11 assists in 32 minutes.
- Dwyane Wade recorded the third triple-double in All-Star Game history in 2012 NBA All-Star Game, with 24 points, 10 rebounds, 10 assists in 33 minutes.
- Kevin Durant recorded the fourth triple-double in All-Star Game history in 2017 NBA All-Star Game, with 21 points, 10 rebounds, 10 assists in 27 minutes.

==== Set with Scottie Pippen ====
Ninth pair of teammates in NBA history to score 40 or more points in the same game: Chicago Bulls (110) at Indiana Pacers (102), February 18, 1996

- Jordan: 44 points, 5 rebounds, 7 assists, 3 steals, 2 blocks in 42 minutes
- Pippen: 40 points, 10 rebounds, 2 assists, 5 steals in 44 minutes

One of at least three pairs of teammates in NBA history to record triple-doubles in the same game: Chicago Bulls (126) vs. Los Angeles Clippers (121), January 3, 1989 (OT)

- Jordan: 41 points, 10 rebounds, 11 assists (and six steals) in 47 minutes
- Pippen: 15 points, 10 rebounds, 12 assists (and two steals) in 42 minutes
- Jason Kidd and Vince Carter achieved this feat as well on April 7, 2007

== Chicago Bulls franchise records ==
Michael Jordan holds approximately 200 records as a Chicago Bull; these are some of them.

=== Regular season ===
==== Service ====
Seasons played: 13

Games played, career: 930

Games played, season: 82 (1984–85, 1986–87, 1987–88, 1989–90, 1990–91, 1995–96, 1996–97, 1997–98)

- Tied with many other players

Minutes played, career: 35,887

==== Scoring ====
Points, career: 29,277

Scoring average, points per game, career: 31.5 (29,277 points in 930 games)

Points, season: 3,041 (1986–87)

Scoring average, points per game, season: 37.1 (3,041/82) (1986–87)

Points, game (overtime): 69, at Cleveland Cavaliers, March 28, 1990

Points, game (regulation): 61, vs. Atlanta Hawks, April 16, 1987

Points, half: 39, second half, vs. Milwaukee Bucks, February 16, 1988

- Broken by Jimmy Butler (40, at Toronto Raptors, January 3, 2016)

Points, quarter: 30, fourth quarter, at Denver Nuggets, November 26, 1988

Consecutive points, game: 23, last 6:33 of second quarter and first 2:12 of third quarter, vs. Atlanta Hawks, April 16, 1987

Consecutive points, quarter: 18, vs. New York Knicks, November 21, 1986

==== Field goals ====
Field goals made, career: 10,962

Field goals made, season: 1,098 (1986–87)

Field goals made, game (overtime): 27, vs. Orlando Magic, January 16, 1993

Field goals made, game (regulation): 24, at Philadelphia 76ers, November 16, 1988

Field goals made, half: 15, first half, vs. Orlando Magic, January 16, 1993

Field goals made, quarter: 11, twice
11, first quarter, vs. Orlando Magic, January 16, 1993

Field goal attempts, career: 21,686

Field goal attempts, season: 2,279 (1986–87)

Field goal attempts, game (overtime): 49, vs. Orlando Magic, January 16, 1993

Field goal attempts, game (regulation): 43, thrice
43, at Los Angeles Lakers, November 28, 1986
43, vs. Houston Rockets, January 15, 1987
43, vs. Orlando Magic, February 14, 1990

Field goal attempts, half: 24, twice
24, second half, vs. Orlando Magic, January 16, 1993

Field goal attempts, overtime: 8, vs. Seattle SuperSonics, February 23, 1988

==== Three-point field goals ====
Three-point field goals made, game: 7, vs. Golden State Warriors, January 18, 1990

- Broken by Chris Duhon on April 16, 2005

==== Free throws ====
Free throws made, one missed, game: 26–27, vs. New Jersey Nets, February 26, 1987

Free throws made, career: 6,798

Free throws made, season: 833 (1986–87)

Free throws made, game: 26, vs. New Jersey Nets, February 26, 1987

Free throws made, half: 20, second half, at Miami Heat, December 30, 1992

Free throws made, quarter: 14, twice
14, fourth quarter, at Utah Jazz, November 15, 1989
14, fourth quarter, at Miami Heat, December 30, 1992

Free throw attempts, career: 8,115

Free throw attempts, season: 972 (1986–87)

Free throw attempts, game: 27, vs. New Jersey Nets, February 26, 1987

Free throw attempts, half: 23, second half, at Miami Heat, December 30, 1992

Free throw attempts, quarter: 16, fourth quarter, at Miami Heat, December 30, 1992

==== Rebounding ====
Rebounds, career: 5,836

Defensive rebounds, career: 4,289

==== Assists ====
Assists, career: 5,012

==== Steals ====
Steals, career: 2,306

Steals, season: 259 (1987–88)

Consecutive games with a steal: 77, March 25, 1988 to March 17, 1989

Steals, game: 10, vs. New Jersey Nets, January 29, 1988

Steals, half: 8, first half, at Boston Celtics, November 9, 1988

Steals, quarter: 6, third quarter, vs. New Jersey Nets, January 29, 1988

==== Personal fouls ====
Personal fouls, quarter: 6, fourth quarter, vs. Detroit Pistons, January 31, 1989

==== Turnovers ====
Turnovers, career: 2,589

=== Rookie ===
Jordan's rookie season was 1984–85.

Minutes played: 3,144

Points: 2,313

Scoring average, points per game: 28.3 (2,313/82)

Field goals made: 837

Field goal attempts: 1,625

Free throws made: 630

Free throw attempts: 746

Steals: 196

=== Playoffs ===
==== Service ====
Games played, career: 179

Minutes played, career: 7,474

==== Scoring ====
Points, career: 5,987

Points, game (overtime): 63, at Boston Celtics, April 20, 1986 (2 OT)

Points, game (regulation): 56, at Miami Heat, April 29, 1992

Points, half: 37, second half, at Miami Heat, April 29, 1992

Points, quarter: 24, fourth quarter, at Philadelphia 76ers, May 11, 1990

Points, overtime: 9, at New York Knicks, May 9, 1989

Consecutive points, game: 17, during second half (from 73 to 90 points), at New York Knicks, June 2, 1993

==== Field goals ====
Field goals made, career: 2,188

Field goals made, game: 24, vs. Cleveland Cavaliers, May 1, 1988

Field goals made, half: 14, four times
14, first half, vs. Cleveland Cavaliers, May 1, 1988
14, second half, at Philadelphia 76ers, May 11, 1990
14, first half, vs. Portland Trail Blazers, June 3, 1992
14, first half, vs. Phoenix Suns, June 16, 1993

Field goals made, quarter: 10, fourth quarter, at Philadelphia 76ers, May 11, 1990

Field goals made, overtime: 4, at New York Knicks, May 9, 1989

Field goal attempts, career: 4,497

Field goal attempts, game: 45, vs. Cleveland Cavaliers, May 1, 1988

Field goal attempts, half: 25, first half, vs. Cleveland Cavaliers, May 1, 1988

Field goal attempts, quarter: 13, first quarter, vs. Portland Trail Blazers, June 3, 1992

Field goal attempts, overtime: 5, first overtime, at Boston Celtics, April 20, 1986

==== Three-point field goals ====
Three-point field goals made, half: 6, first half, vs. Portland Trail Blazers, June 3, 1992

Three-point field goal attempts, half: 10, first half, vs. Portland Trail Blazers, June 3, 1992

==== Free throws ====
Free throws made, career: 1,463

Free throws made, game: 23, vs. New York Knicks, May 14, 1989

Free throws made, half: 14, second half, vs. Detroit Pistons, May 28, 1990

Free throws made, quarter: 13, fourth quarter, vs. Detroit Pistons, May 21, 1991

Free throws made, overtime: 3, vs. New Jersey Nets, April 24, 1998

Free throw attempts, career: 1,766

Free throw attempts, game: 28, vs. New York Knicks, May 14, 1989

Free throw attempts, half: 17, second half, vs. New York Knicks, May 14, 1989

Free throw attempts, quarter: 14, fourth quarter, vs. Detroit Pistons, May 21, 1991

Free throw attempts, overtime: 5, vs. New Jersey Nets, April 24, 1998

==== Assists ====
Assists, career: 1,022

Assists, game: 14, at New York Knicks, June 2, 1993

==== Personal fouls ====
Personal fouls, overtime: 3, vs. Cleveland Cavaliers, May 5, 1989

==== Steals ====
Steals, career: 376

Steals, game: 6, four times

- 6, vs. Detroit Pistons, May 15, 1988
- 6, vs. New York Knicks, May 13, 1989
- 6, vs. Philadelphia 76ers, May 16, 1990
- 6, at New York Knicks, April 30, 1991

== Washington Wizards franchise records ==
Points, half: 34, first half, vs. Charlotte Hornets, December 29, 2001

Points, first quarter: 24, vs. Charlotte Hornets, December 29, 2001

Points, second quarter: 19, vs. Chicago Bulls, January 4, 2002

MCI Center record — points, game: 51, vs. Charlotte Hornets, December 29, 2001

- Shared with Gilbert Arenas

== Career highs ==
Chicago Bulls franchise record
NBA record (current)
NBA record (former)

=== Regular season ===
Stat	High	Half/Quarter	Opponent	Date
Points (OT)	69	—	at Cleveland Cavaliers	March 28, 1990
Points	61	—	vs. Atlanta Hawks	April 16, 1987
Points, half	39	second	vs. Milwaukee Bucks	February 16, 1988
Points, quarter	30	fourth	at Denver Nuggets	November 26, 1989
Consecutive points (game)	23	last 6:33 of 2nd; first 2:12 of 3rd	vs. Atlanta Hawks	April 16, 1987
Consecutive points (quarter)	18	fourth	vs. New York Knicks	November 21, 1986
Field goal percentage	24–29 (.828)	—	at Philadelphia 76ers	November 16, 1988
Field goals made (OT)	27	—	vs. Orlando Magic	January 16, 1993
Field goals made	24	—	at Philadelphia 76ers	November 16, 1988
Field goals made, half	15	first	vs. Orlando Magic	January 16, 1993
Field goals made, quarter	11	first	vs. Orlando Magic	January 16, 1993
Field goal attempts (OT)	49	—	vs. Orlando Magic	January 16, 1993
Field goal attempts	43	—	at Los Angeles Lakers	November 28, 1986
Field goal attempts	43	—	vs. Houston Rockets	January 15, 1987
Field goal attempts, half	24	second	vs. Orlando Magic	January 16, 1993
Free throws made, no misses	15–15	—	vs. New Jersey Nets	January 10, 1987
Free throws made, one miss	26–27	—	vs. New Jersey Nets	February 26, 1987
Free throws made	26	—	vs. New Jersey Nets	February 26, 1987
Free throws made, half	20	second	at Miami Heat	December 30, 1992
Free throws made, quarter	14	fourth	at Utah Jazz	November 15, 1989
Free throws made, quarter	14	fourth	at Miami Heat	December 30, 1992
Free throw attempts	27	—	vs. New Jersey Nets	February 26, 1987
Free throw attempts, half	23	second	at Miami Heat	December 30, 1992
Free throw attempts, quarter	16	fourth	at Miami Heat	December 30, 1992
3-point field goals made	7	—	vs. Golden State Warriors	January 18, 1990
3-point field goal attempts	12	—	vs. Golden State Warriors	January 18, 1990
Rebounds (OT)	18	—	at Cleveland Cavaliers	March 28, 1990
Rebounds	18	—	vs. Seattle SuperSonics	March 18, 1997
Offensive rebounds	8	—	at Los Angeles Lakers	November 28, 1986
Offensive rebounds	8	—	vs. Denver Nuggets	December 5, 1989
Offensive rebounds	8	—	vs. Los Angeles Lakers	December 21, 1990
Offensive rebounds	8	—	vs. Seattle SuperSonics	March 18, 1997
Defensive rebounds	14	—	at New Jersey Nets	March 16, 1996
Assists	17	—	at Portland Trail Blazers	March 24, 1989
Steals	10	—	vs. New Jersey Nets	January 29, 1988
Steals, half	8	first	at Boston Celtics	November 9, 1988
Steals, quarter	6	third	vs. New Jersey Nets	January 29, 1988
Blocked shots	6	—	at Seattle SuperSonics	December 2, 1986
Turnovers	9	—	(Washington) at Chicago Bulls	January 19, 2002
Turnovers	9	—	(Washington) vs. Orlando Magic	March 11, 2003
Minutes played (3 OT)	56	—	at Utah Jazz	February 3, 1992

=== Playoffs ===
Stat	High	Half/Quarter	Opponent	Date
Points (2 OT)	63	—	at Boston Celtics	April 20, 1986
Points	56	—	at Miami Heat	April 29, 1992
Points, half	37	second	at Miami Heat	April 29, 1992
Points, quarter	24	fourth	at Philadelphia 76ers	May 11, 1990
Points, overtime	9	—	at New York Knicks	May 9, 1989
Consecutive points	17	second half, from 73 to 90 points	at New York Knicks	June 2, 1993
Field goal percentage	15–18 (.833)	—	vs. Los Angeles Lakers	June 5, 1991
Field goals made	24	—	vs. Cleveland Cavaliers	May 1, 1988
Field goals made, half	14	first	vs. Cleveland Cavaliers	May 1, 1988
Field goals made, half	14	second	at Philadelphia 76ers	May 11, 1990
Field goals made, half	14	first	vs. Portland Trail Blazers	June 3, 1992
Field goals made, half	14	first	vs. Phoenix Suns	June 16, 1993
Field goals made, quarter	10	fourth	at Philadelphia 76ers	May 11, 1990
Field goals made, overtime	4	—	at New York Knicks	May 9, 1989
Field goal attempts	45	—	vs. Cleveland Cavaliers	May 1, 1988
Field goal attempts, half	25	first	vs. Cleveland Cavaliers	May 1, 1988
Field goal attempts, quarter	13	first	vs. Portland Trail Blazers	June 3, 1992
Field goal attempts, overtime	5	first	at Boston Celtics	April 20, 1986
Three-point field goals made	6	—	vs. Portland Trail Blazers	June 3, 1992
Three-point field goals made	6	—	vs. New York Knicks	May 31, 1993
Three-point field goals made, half	6	first	vs. Portland Trail Blazers	June 3, 1992
Three-point field goal attempts	11	—	at Philadelphia 76ers	May 11, 1990
Three-point field goal attempts, half	9	first	vs. Portland Trail Blazers	June 3, 1992
Free throws made, none missed	12–12	—	vs. Cleveland Cavaliers	April 28, 1988
Free throws made, one missed	16–17	—	vs. New York Knicks	May 29, 1993
Free throws made	23	—	vs. New York Knicks	May 14, 1989
Free throws made, half	14	second	vs. Detroit Pistons	May 28, 1990
Free throws made, quarter	13	fourth	vs. Detroit Pistons	May 21, 1991
Free throws made, overtime	3	—	vs. New Jersey Nets	April 24, 1998
Free throw attempts	28	—	vs. New York Knicks	May 14, 1989
Free throw attempts, half	17	second	vs. New York Knicks	May 14, 1989
Free throw attempts, quarter	14	fourth	vs. Detroit Pistons	May 21, 1991
Free throw attempts, overtime	5	—	vs. New Jersey Nets	April 24, 1998
Rebounds	19	—	vs. Philadelphia 76ers	May 14, 1991
Offensive rebounds	8	—	vs. Cleveland Cavaliers	May 21, 1992
Defensive rebounds	15	—	vs. Philadelphia 76ers	May 14, 1991
Assists	14	—	at New York Knicks	June 2, 1993
Steals	6	—	vs. Detroit Pistons	May 15, 1988
Steals	6	—	vs. New York Knicks	May 13, 1989
Steals	6	—	vs. Philadelphia 76ers	May 16, 1990
Steals	6	—	at New York Knicks	April 30, 1991
Blocked shots	5	—	at Detroit Pistons	May 25, 1991
Turnovers	8	—	vs. Detroit Pistons	June 2, 1989
Turnovers	8	—	at Orlando Magic	May 7, 1995
Minutes played (3 OT)	57	—	vs. Phoenix Suns	June 13, 1993

=== NBA Finals ===
Stat	High	Half/Quarter	Opponent	Date
Points	55	—	vs. Phoenix Suns	June 16, 1993
Points, half	35	first	vs. Portland Trail Blazers	June 3, 1992
Points, quarter	22	second	vs. Phoenix Suns	June 16, 1993
Field goal percentage	15–18 (.833)	—	vs. Los Angeles Lakers	June 5, 1991
Field goals made	21	—	vs. Phoenix Suns	June 16, 1993
Field goals made, half	14	first	vs. Portland Trail Blazers	June 3, 1992
Field goals made, half	14	first	vs. Phoenix Suns	June 16, 1993
Field goals made, quarter	9	second	vs. Phoenix Suns	June 16, 1993
Field goal attempts (3 OT)	43	—	vs. Phoenix Suns	June 13, 1993
Field goal attempts, half	23	second	vs. Utah Jazz	June 13, 1997
Field goal attempts, quarter	13	first	vs. Portland Trail Blazers	June 3, 1992
3-point field goals made	6	—	vs. Portland Trail Blazers	June 3, 1992
3-point field goals made, half	6	first	vs. Portland Trail Blazers	June 3, 1992
3-point field goal attempts	10	—	vs. Portland Trail Blazers	June 3, 1992
3-point field goal attempts, half	10	first	vs. Portland Trail Blazers	June 3, 1992
Free throws made, no misses	11–11	—	at Seattle SuperSonics	June 9, 1996
Free throws made	16	—	at Portland Trail Blazers	June 12, 1992
Free throws made, half	10	second	vs. Utah Jazz	June 4, 1997
Free throws made, quarter	9	second	at Utah Jazz	June 11, 1997
Free throw attempts	21	—	vs. Utah Jazz	June 4, 1997
Free throw attempts, half	15	second	vs. Utah Jazz	June 4, 1997
Free throw attempts, quarter	12	fourth	vs. Utah Jazz	June 4, 1997
Rebounds	13	—	vs. Utah Jazz	June 4, 1997
Offensive rebounds	5	—	at Phoenix Suns	June 11, 1993
Defensive rebounds	10	—	vs. Utah Jazz	June 13, 1997
Assists	13	—	vs. Los Angeles Lakers	June 5, 1991
Assists	13	—	at Los Angeles Lakers	June 9, 1991
Steals	5	—	at Los Angeles Lakers	June 12, 1991
Steals	5	—	at Phoenix Suns	June 9, 1993
Blocked shots	2	—		six times
Turnovers	6	—	at Los Angeles Lakers	June 12, 1991
Minutes played (3 OT)	57	—	vs. Phoenix Suns	June 13, 1993

== Career highs against opponents ==
Opponent	High	Date
Atlanta Hawks	61	April 16, 1987
Boston Celtics	63 (2 OT)	April 20, 1986 (Playoffs)
Charlotte Hornets/Bobcats	52	March 12, 1993
Chicago Bulls	29	January 4, 2002
Cleveland Cavaliers	69 (OT)	March 28, 1990
Dallas Mavericks	43	April 7, 1990
Denver Nuggets	52	November 26, 1988
Detroit Pistons	61 (OT)	March 4, 1987
Golden State Warriors	49	November 24, 1992
Houston Rockets	45	January 18, 1998
Indiana Pacers	53	April 12, 1987
Los Angeles Clippers	49	November 21, 1997
Los Angeles Lakers	54 (OT)	November 20, 1992
Miami Heat	56	April 29, 1992 (Playoffs)
Milwaukee Bucks*	50	February 16, 1989
Minnesota Timberwolves	45	November 8, 1989
New Orleans Hornets/Pelicans	45	February 1, 2003
New Jersey Nets	58	February 26, 1987
New York Knicks	55	March 28, 1995
Orlando Magic	64	January 16, 1993
Philadelphia 76ers	56	March 24, 1987
Phoenix Suns	55	June 16, 1993 (Finals)
Portland Trail Blazers	53	January 8, 1987
Sacramento Kings	49	February 19, 1988
San Antonio Spurs	45	November 13, 1984
Seattle SuperSonics**	45	February 2, 1997
Toronto Raptors	38	January 18, 1996
Utah Jazz	47	December 2, 1987
Vancouver/Memphis Grizzlies	33	December 18, 2002
Washington Bullets/Wizards	57	December 23, 1992

*Jordan scored 50 points against the Milwaukee Bucks twice. The most recent occurrence is listed.
**Jordan scored 45 points against the Seattle SuperSonics twice. The most recent occurrence is listed.

== Milestones ==
Milestone	Game	Date	Age	Career games
40-point game against every Eastern Conference team*	41 at Milwaukee Bucks	December 12, 1986	23 years, 298 days	
50-point game against every Eastern Conference team*	52 vs. Cleveland Cavaliers	December 17, 1987	24 years, 303 days	
40-point game against every team in the NBA*	47 vs. Miami Heat	April 1, 1990	27 years, 43 days	
40-point game against every team in the NBA	40 vs. Washington Bullets	February 19, 1991	28 years, 2 days	
50-point game against every Eastern Conference team**	56 vs. Miami Heat (PO)	April 29, 1992	29 years, 72 days	
1,000 points	35 vs. Denver Nuggets	January 14, 1985	21 years, 332 days	38
2,000 points	38 vs. Indiana Pacers	March 26, 1985	22 years, 37 days	73
3,000 points	48 vs. Boston Celtics	November 14, 1986	23 years, 270 days	108
4,000 points	43 vs. Houston Rockets	January 15, 1987	23 years, 332 days	134
5,000 points	49 at Philadelphia 76ers	March 11, 1987	24 years, 22 days	161
6,000 points	33 vs. Atlanta Hawks	November 20, 1987	24 years, 276 days	190
7,000 points	36 vs. Golden State Warriors	January 23, 1988	24 years, 340 days	220
8,000 points	49 at Philadelphia 76ers	March 23, 1988	25 years, 35 days	248
9,000 points	26 at Los Angeles Clippers	November 23, 1988	25 years, 280 days	275
10,000 points	33 at Philadelphia 76ers	January 25, 1989	25 years, 343 days	303
11,000 points	40 vs. Detroit Pistons	April 7, 1989	26 years, 49 days	337
12,000 points	52 at Orlando Magic	December 20, 1989	26 years, 306 days	368
13,000 points	35 vs. Portland Trail Blazers	February 23, 1990	27 years, 6 days	398
14,000 points	22 at Detroit Pistons	April 22, 1990	27 years, 64 days	427
15,000 points	40 at Philadelphia 76ers	January 9, 1991	27 years, 326 days	460
16,000 points	22 vs. Atlanta Hawks	March 20, 1991	28 years, 31 days	492
17,000 points	23 at Los Angeles Clippers	November 6, 1991	28 years, 262 days	522
18,000 points	17 at New York Knicks	February 13, 1992	28 years, 361 days	558
19,000 points	32 vs. Detroit Pistons	April 19, 1992	29 years, 62 days	589
20,000 points	35 vs. Milwaukee Bucks	January 8, 1993	29 years, 326 days	620
21,000 points	34 vs. Minnesota Timberwolves	March 23, 1993	30 years, 34 days	651
22,000 points	42 vs. Charlotte Hornets	November 13, 1995	32 years, 269 days	
23,000 points	48 at Philadelphia 76ers	January 13, 1996	32 years, 330 days	
24,000 points	38 at Philadelphia 76ers	March 18, 1996	33 years, 30 days	
25,000 points	35 at San Antonio Spurs	November 30, 1996	33 years, 273 days	
26,000 points	43 vs. Charlotte Hornets	February 11, 1997		
27,000 points	29 vs. Orlando Magic	November 5, 1997		
28,000 points	20 at Philadelphia 76ers	January 15, 1998	34 years, 332 days	
29,000 points	41 at Minnesota Timberwolves	April 3, 1998	35 years, 45 days	
30,000 points	29 vs. Chicago Bulls	January 4, 2002	38 years, 321 days	
31,000 points	14 vs. Portland Trail Blazers	December 10, 2002	39 years, 296 days	
32,000 points	24 at Golden State Warriors	March 23, 2003	40 years, 34 days	

*Excluding the Washington Bullets
**Expansion era, and including the Washington Bullets

== NBA regular season leader ==
- Scoring (10 seasons): 1987 (37.1), 1988 (35.0), 1989 (32.5), 1990 (33.6), 1991 (31.5), 1992 (30.1), 1993 (32.6), 1996 (30.4), 1997 (29.6), 1998 (28.7)
- Steals per game (3 seasons): 1988 (3.2), 1990 (2.8), 1993 (2.8)
- Field goals made (10 seasons): 1987 (1,098), 1988 (1,069), 1989 (966), 1990 (1,034), 1991 (990), 1992 (943), 1993 (992), 1996 (916), 1997 (920), 1998 (881)
- Field goal attempts (9 seasons): 1987 (2,279), 1988 (1,998), 1990 (1,964), 1991 (1,837), 1992 (1,818), 1993 (2,003), 1996 (1,850), 1997 (1,892), 1998 (1,893)
- Free throws made (2 seasons): 1987 (833), 1988 (723)
- Free throw attempts (1 season): 1987 (972)
- Points (11 seasons): 1985 (2,313), 1987 (3,041), 1988 (2,868), 1989 (2,633), 1990 (2,753), 1991 (2,580), 1992 (2,404), 1993 (2,541), 1996 (2,491), 1997 (2,431), 1998 (2,357)
- Steals (3 seasons): 1988 (259), 1990 (227), 1993 (221)
- Minutes played (3 seasons): 1987 (3,281), 1988 (3,311), 1989 (3,255)
- Games played (5 seasons): 1985 (82), 1987 (82), 1990 (82), 1991 (82), 1998 (82)

- Jordan played in all 82 of his team's games in nine different seasons.

== Other notes ==
- Regular season games in which Jordan was leading scorer: 700 *
- Regular season games in which Jordan was team's leading scorer: 867 *
- Regular season games in which Jordan was Bulls leading scorer: 793 *
- Percentage of team's points, career: .290 (32,292/111,541)
- Highest percentage of team's points, game: .602 (56/93), March 24, 1987 vs. Philadelphia 76ers
- Jordan played in 1072 regular season games in his career.

* Including ties

== 50-point games ==
Number	Date	Opponent	Box Score	Points	Field goals	3 pt	Free throws	Assists	Rebounds	Steals	Blocks	Notes	Video
1 (Playoffs)	April 20, 1986	at Boston Celtics	L 131–135	63	22–41	0–0	19–21	6	5	3	2	First Round, Game 2 Double Overtime	
2	November 1, 1986	at New York Knicks	W 106–103	50	15–31	0–0	20–22	3	6	4	3	Opening night	
3	January 8, 1987	vs. Portland Trail Blazers	W 121–117	53	20–34	0–0	13–16	5	4	3	2		
4	February 26, 1987	vs. New Jersey Nets	W 128–113	58	16–25	0–0	26–27	3	8	3	2	37 minutes	
5	March 4, 1987	at Detroit Pistons	W 125–120	61	22–39	0–0	17–18	3	7	3	3	Overtime	
6	March 24, 1987	vs. Philadelphia 76ers	W 93–91	56	22–32	0–1	12–15	3	7	8	0		
7	April 12, 1987	vs. Indiana Pacers	W 116–95	53	19–27	0–0	15–18	8	4	4	2		
8	April 13, 1987	at Milwaukee Bucks	W 114–107	50	16–31	0–1	18–22	4	9	4	3		
9	April 16, 1987	vs. Atlanta Hawks	L 114–117	61	22–38	0–3	17–21	1	10	4	1		
10	December 17, 1987	vs. Cleveland Cavaliers	W 111–100	52	20–31	0–0	12–12	6	3	4	1		
11	February 26, 1988	vs. Portland Trail Blazers	L 96–104	52	21–34	0–2	10–12	3	8	2	3		
12	March 18, 1988	vs. Boston Celtics	W 113–103	50	19–32	1–2	11–11	9	5	5	1		
13	April 3, 1988	at Detroit Pistons	W 112–110	59	21–27	0–1	17–19	6	4	2	2		
14 (Playoffs)	April 28, 1988	vs. Cleveland Cavaliers	W 104–93	50	19–35	0–0	12–12	2	7	2	2	First Round, Game 1	
15 (Playoffs)	May 1, 1988	vs. Cleveland Cavaliers	W 106–101	55	24–45	0–0	7–7	3	6	4	1	First Round, Game 2	
16	November 9, 1988	at Boston Celtics	W 110–104	52	18–33	2–4	14–16	2	3	9	2		
17	November 16, 1988	at Philadelphia 76ers	L 110–123	52	24–29	0–1	4–4	1	9	4	2		
18	November 26, 1988	at Denver Nuggets	L 123–128	52	19–27	3–5	11–14	7	11	1	0		
19	January 21, 1989	vs. Phoenix Suns	L 107–116	53	20–28	0–0	13–15	8	14	2	1		
20	February 16, 1989	vs. Milwaukee Bucks	W 117–116	50	16–26	1–2	17–18	5	8	3	0		
21 (Playoffs)	May 5, 1989	vs. Cleveland Cavaliers	L 105–108	50	14–28	0–1	22–27	4	3	3	0	First Round, Game 4	
22	November 3, 1989	vs. Cleveland Cavaliers	W 124–119	54	19–31	1–2	15–17	6	14	3	1	Opening night Overtime	
23	December 20, 1989	at Orlando Magic	L 109–110	52	20–37	2–3	10–10	7	5	4	0		
24	March 28, 1990	at Cleveland Cavaliers	W 117–113	69	23–37	2–6	21–23	6	18	4	1	Career highs in pts & reb Overtime	
25	March 19, 1992	at Washington Bullets	W 106–100	51	19–30	1–1	12–15	3	11	1	1		
26	March 24, 1992	vs. Denver Nuggets	W 116–103	50	18–31	2–3	12–13	6	6	3	0		
27 (Playoffs)	April 29, 1992	at Miami Heat	W 119–114	56	20–30	0–0	16–18	5	5	4	2	First Round, Game 3	
28	November 20, 1992	at Los Angeles Lakers	L 118–120	54	21–39	1–2	11–14	7	13	1	3	Overtime	
29	December 23, 1992	vs. Washington Bullets	W 107–98	57	22–37	6–8	7–8	10	2	3	1		
30	January 16, 1993	vs. Orlando Magic	L 124–128	64	27–49	1–5	9–11	1	6	5	0	Overtime	
31	March 12, 1993	vs. Charlotte Hornets	W 123–108	52	21–35	2–4	8–9	5	9	2	1		
32 (Playoffs)	May 31, 1993	vs. New York Knicks	W 105–95	54	18–30	6–9	12–14	2	6	2	1	Conf. Finals, Game 4; 39 minutes	
33 (Finals)	June 16, 1993	vs. Phoenix Suns	W 111–105	55	21–37	0–1	13–18	4	8	0	0	NBA Finals, Game 4	
34	March 28, 1995	at New York Knicks	W 113–111	55	21–37	3–4	10–11	2	4	1	0	39 minutes	
35	March 7, 1996	vs. Detroit Pistons	W 102–81	53	21–28	2–4	9–10	2	11	6	0	38 minutes	
36	November 6, 1996	at Miami Heat	W 106–100	50	18–33	1–2	13–14	0	6	1	1		
37	January 21, 1997	vs. New York Knicks	W 88–87	51	18–30	5–8	10–11	4	4	2	0		
38 (Playoffs)	April 27, 1997	vs. Washington Bullets	W 109–104	55	22–35	1–2	10–10	2	7	2	0	First Round, Game 2	
39	December 29, 2001	vs. Charlotte Hornets	W 107–90	51	21–38	0–2	9–10	4	7	3	0	38 years old 38 minutes	

== Triple doubles ==
Number	Date	Opponent	Box Score	Points	Rebounds	Assists	Steals	Notes
1	January 14, 1985	vs. Denver Nuggets	W 122–113	35	14	15	3	
2	March 1, 1985	vs. New York Knicks	W 109–104	21	10	10	3	
3	March 17, 1985	vs. Milwaukee Bucks	W 119–117	32	11	16	1	Overtime
4	January 2, 1988	vs. New Jersey Nets	W 116–93	25	10	10	6	3 blocks
5	January 16, 1988	vs. Detroit Pistons	W 115–99	36	10	10	4	4 blocks
6	January 3, 1989	vs. Los Angeles Clippers	W 126–121	41	10	11	6	Overtime; Scottie Pippen recorded a triple-double in the same game
7	January 13, 1989	vs. Denver Nuggets	W 104–99	38	12	11	3	
8	January 31, 1989	vs. Detroit Pistons	L 98–104	21	12	10	2	Overtime
9	March 13, 1989	vs. Indiana Pacers	W 122–90	21	14	14	3	2 blocks
10	March 25, 1989	at Seattle SuperSonics	W 111–110	21	12	12	3	
11	March 28, 1989	vs. Golden State Warriors	W 115–106	33	12	11	4	
12	March 29, 1989	at Milwaukee Bucks	W 106–102	32	10	10	2	
13	March 31, 1989	vs. Cleveland Cavaliers	L 100–109	37	10	10	3	
14	April 2, 1989	vs. New Jersey Nets	W 106–95	27	14	12	2	2 blocks
15	April 4, 1989	vs. Charlotte Hornets	W 121–101	33	10	12	6	
16	April 6, 1989	at Detroit Pistons	L 108–115	31	13	10	2	
17	April 9, 1989	at Atlanta Hawks	L 100–108	40	10	12	1	
18	April 13, 1989	at Indiana Pacers	W 109–105	47	11	13	4	2 blocks
19	April 14, 1989	at New Jersey Nets	L 111–123	29	10	12	3	2 blocks
20	April 21, 1989	vs. Washington Bullets	W 115–113	34	14	11	2	
21 (Playoffs)	May 9, 1989	at New York Knicks	W 120–109	34	10	12	2	Semifinals, Game 1
22	February 23, 1990	vs. Portland Trail Blazers	W 113–102	35	10	10	1	2–2 3-point shooting
23	December 6, 1991	vs. Charlotte Hornets	W 114–96	19	11	10	1	
24	February 21, 1992	at Atlanta Hawks	W 103–88	33	10	14	4	
25	December 9, 1992	vs. Cleveland Cavaliers	W 108–91	28	11	10	4	2 blocks
26	December 19, 1992	vs. Philadelphia 76ers	L 96–98	23	10	10	4	
27	December 29, 1992	at Charlotte Hornets	W 114–103	28	12	11	0	
28	January 15, 1993	vs. Golden State Warriors	W 122–101	26	12	10	5	2 blocks
29 (Playoffs)	June 2, 1993	at New York Knicks	W 97–94	29	10	14	2	Conference Finals, Game 5
30 (All-Star)	February 9, 1997	vs. West All-Stars	W 132–120	14	11	11	2	All-Star Game
31	April 14, 1997	vs. Toronto Raptors	W 117–100	30	11	10	3	4–7 3pt

== Near misses with a quadruple-double ==
Date	Opponent	Box Score	Points	Rebounds	Assists	Steals	Notes
January 2, 1988	vs. New Jersey Nets	W 116–93	25	10	10	6	37 minutes
January 3, 1989	vs. Los Angeles Clippers	W 126–121	41	10	11	6	Overtime
January 15, 1989	vs. Boston Celtics	W 110–104	42	9	11	8	
April 4, 1989	vs. Charlotte Hornets	W 121–101	33	10	12	6	

== Near misses with a five-by-five ==
Date	Opponent	Box Score	Points	Rebounds	Assists	Steals	Blocks	Notes
December 2, 1986	at Seattle SuperSonics	W 115–109	40	9	6	3	6	Overtime
February 16, 1987	vs. Sacramento Kings	L 120–124	43	7	6	5	4	Overtime
February 22, 1987	vs. Cleveland Cavaliers	W 102–98	43	4	6	8	5	39 minutes
March 6, 1987	vs. New York Knicks	L 109–110	27	8	5	8	3	39 minutes
April 1, 1987	at Indiana Pacers	L 94–99	26	9	7	5	3	
November 20, 1987	vs. Atlanta Hawks	W 94–92	33	7	7	4	4	
December 12, 1987	vs. Houston Rockets	W 112–103	44	3	9	5	5	
January 2, 1988	vs. New Jersey Nets	W 116–93	25	10	10	6	3	37 minutes
January 5, 1988	vs. Indiana Pacers	W 93–77	31	11	9	4	5	38 minutes
January 7, 1988	vs. Denver Nuggets	W 100–96	28	9	5	6	4	
January 16, 1988	vs. Detroit Pistons	W 115–99	36	10	10	4	4	38 minutes
November 23, 1988	at Los Angeles Clippers	L 97–105	26	12	7	5	4	
December 15, 1990	vs. Cleveland Cavaliers	W 116–98	24	9	6	5	3	27 minutes
May 25, 1991	at Detroit Pistons	W 113–107	33	7	7	3	5	Conf. Finals, Game 3
May 18, 1995	vs. Orlando Magic	L 102–108	24	9	7	4	4	Semifinals, Game 6

== Game-winning shots ==
Number	Time left (seconds)	Score	Opponent	Date
1	4.0	118–116	Indiana Pacers	November 11, 1984
2	5.0	95–93	New York Knicks	December 7, 1984
3	5.0	120–119	Indiana Pacers	March 26, 1985
4 (Playoffs)	22.0	109–107	Milwaukee Bucks	April 24, 1985
5	0.0	116–115	Cleveland Cavaliers	October 25, 1985
6	9.0	112–110	Atlanta Hawks	November 11, 1986
7	1.0	101–99	New York Knicks	November 21, 1986
8	2.0	95–93	Milwaukee Bucks	February 12, 1988
9	4.0	112–110	Detroit Pistons	April 3, 1988
10	0.0	100–99	New Jersey Nets	April 15, 1988
11	1.0	117–116	Milwaukee Bucks	February 16, 1989
12 (Playoffs)	0.0	101–100	Cleveland Cavaliers	May 7, 1989
13 (Playoffs)	4.0	113–111	New York Knicks	May 19, 1989
14 (Playoffs)	3.0	99–97	Detroit Pistons	May 27, 1989
15	0.0	84–82	Utah Jazz	November 13, 1990
16	3.4	104–96	Los Angeles Lakers	June 7, 1991
17	0.0	115–112	Charlotte Hornets	January 22, 1992
18	0.0	98–96	Detroit Pistons	November 11, 1992
19	2.1	123–121	Charlotte Hornets	March 17, 1993
20 (Playoffs)	0.0	103–101	Cleveland Cavaliers	May 17, 1993
21	0.0	99–98	Atlanta Hawks	March 25, 1995
22	0.0	103–100	Charlotte Hornets	February 11, 1997
23	8.0	89–87	Seattle Supersonics	March 18, 1997
24 (Finals)	0.0	84–82	Utah Jazz	June 1, 1997
25	0.0	112–110	Atlanta Hawks	February 13, 1998
26	5.4	102–100	Toronto Raptors	March 22, 1998
27 (Finals)	5.2	87–86	Utah Jazz	June 14, 1998
28	3.2	87–86	New York Knicks	December 22, 2001
29	0.0	93–92	Cleveland Cavaliers	January 31, 2002
30	0.0	97–96	Phoenix Suns	February 15, 2002

== Wins and losses ==
During his time in the NBA, the Chicago Bulls teams on which Michael Jordan played set numerous league records for winning, both in the regular season and postseason. However, since wins and losses are a team achievement, only lesser known statistics are listed here.

- The longest losing streak of his career was eight games, which occurred during his third stint in the NBA, with the Washington Wizards (November 4 to 22, 2001).
- The longest losing streak of his Chicago Bulls career was six games, which occurred twice (March 9 to 17, 1987 and April 6 to 16, 1989). This latter losing streak began with the last game of Jordan's triple-double streak.
- The longest losing streak of the Chicago Bulls dynasty era was three games, which occurred at the very beginning of the era (November 2 to 6, 1990).
- The longest winning streak of his career was 18 games, which occurred from December 29, 1995, to February 2, 1996. At the time, it was tied for the third longest winning steak in NBA history, and is now tied for the 11th longest winning streak in NBA history. It is the longest winning streak in Chicago Bulls franchise history.
- The Chicago Bulls also set the NBA playoff record for consecutive road victories at eight, across the 1991 and 1992 postseasons. It was later broken by the Los Angeles Lakers during a stretch from 2001 to 2002.

== See also ==
- List of NBA rookie single-season scoring leaders
- List of NBA single-season scoring leaders
- List of NBA single-season steals per game leaders
- List of NBA annual scoring leaders
- List of NBA annual steals leaders
- List of NBA annual minutes leaders
- List of NBA single-game scoring leaders
- List of NBA single-game steals leaders
- List of NBA single-game playoff scoring leaders
- List of NBA career scoring leaders
- List of NBA career steals leaders
- List of NBA career turnovers leaders
- List of NBA career triple-double leaders
- List of NBA career free throw scoring leaders
- List of NBA franchise career scoring leaders
- List of NBA career playoff scoring leaders
- List of NBA career playoff assists leaders
- List of NBA career playoff steals leaders
- List of NBA career playoff turnovers leaders
- List of NBA career playoff 3-point scoring leaders
- List of NBA career playoff free throw scoring leaders
- List of NBA players with most championships
- List of multi-sport athletes
