= NBA Live Legend All-Stars Teams =

NBA Live Legend All-Stars Teams is a video game feature on the NBA Live video games series (since NBA Live 2000). It gathers five teams, each representing a decade, starting from the 1950s. Each team consists of great (although not necessarily the greatest) players from that era. Most of the players had been inducted into Naismith Memorial Basketball Hall of Fame or named NBA 50 Greatest Players.

== Players ==
This is the list of players on the teams, with their position on the game. On each team, players above the line are starters.

Players in bold are member of the NBA 50 Greatest Players.
Players with an asterisk (*) are Hall of Fame members.

=== '50s All-Stars ===
- PF **Bob Pettit***
- PF **Dolph Schayes***
- SF **Paul Arizin***
- SG **Bill Sharman***
- PG **Bob Cousy***

- C **George Mikan***^^
- PF Harry Gallatin*
- SG Andy Phillip*^
- SF Richie Guerin*
- SF George Yardley*
- SG Larry Costello^*
- C Carl Braun*^^^
- C Clyde Lovellette*

All of the players on this team except Costello, Hagan, Braun and Lovellette were nominated to the NBA 25th Anniversary Team in 1971.

^ Phillip and Costello only appeared on earlier series.
^^ Later, Mikan becomes the starting center.
^^^ Braun was actually a guard.

=== '60s All-Stars ===
- C **Wilt Chamberlain***
- C **Bill Russell***
- SF **Elgin Baylor***
- PG **Oscar Robertson***
- PG **Jerry West***^

- C **Willis Reed***
- SG **Hal Greer***
- PG **Lenny Wilkens***
- PF **Jerry Lucas***
- SG **Sam Jones***
- PF Tommy Heinsohn*
- C Walt Bellamy*
- SF **Dave DeBusschere***

^ West only appeared on earlier series.
^^ DeBusschere appeared from Live 06-09

=== '70s All-Stars ===
- C Bob Lanier*^
- SF **John Havlicek***
- SF **Rick Barry***
- SG **Pete Maravich***
- PG **Walt Frazier***

- C **Dave Cowens***
- C **Wes Unseld***
- SG **Earl Monroe***
- PG **Nate Archibald***
- SF **Billy Cunningham***
- PG **Dave Bing***
- C **Bill Walton***

^ Lanier, the starting center of this team, was the only player on this team not to be named NBA 50 Greatest Players in 1996 (although he was on the selection panel for that list).

=== '80s All-Stars ===
- C **Kareem Abdul-Jabbar***^
- PF **Kevin McHale***
- SF **Larry Bird***
- SG **George Gervin***
- PG **Magic Johnson***

- SF **Julius Erving***^
- SG **Clyde Drexler***
- PG **Isiah Thomas***
- C **Moses Malone***
- PF **Charles Barkley***^^
- C **Hakeem Olajuwon***^^
- C **Robert Parish***
- SF **James Worthy***
- SF **Dominique Wilkins***
- C **Patrick Ewing***^^^

^ Abdul-Jabbar and Drexler only appear on later series.
^^ Barkley and Olajuwon only appeared on earlier series.
^^^ Ewing first appeared on 1990s All-Stars Team, then shifted into 1980s All-Stars Team, then disappears on later series.

=== '90s All-Stars ===
- C **Hakeem Olajuwon***^^^
- PF **Karl Malone***
- SF **Scottie Pippen***
- SG **Michael Jordan***^
- PG **John Stockton***^

- C **David Robinson***^
- SF Grant Hill*
- SG Reggie Miller*
- PF Shawn Kemp^
- SG Mitch Richmond*^
- SG Penny Hardaway^^
- C Alonzo Mourning*^^
- PG Gary Payton*
- PG Jason Kidd^^
- C **Shaquille O'Neal***
- PF Larry Johnson^^
- SF Chris Mullin*^^
- PG Tim Hardaway*^^
- PF Chris Webber^^

^Jordan, Pippen, Stockton, Robinson, Kemp, Barkley and Richmond only appear on earlier series.
^^Both Hardaways, Mourning, Kidd, Johnson, Mullin and Webber only appear on later series.
^^^Olajuwon was added to the '90s All-Stars from Live 07-09
