= NBA 60 Greatest Playoff Moments =

Television special

The NBA 60 Greatest Playoff Moments were chosen in 2006 to honor the 60th anniversary of the founding of the National Basketball Association (NBA). These 60 moments (in total, there were sixty-two moments; the last three were deemed tied) were selected through a vote by a 25-member panel of experts made up by media members and former players. The last 50 moments (from the eleventh to the sixtieth) were ranked by the panel. The top 10 moments were instead ranked by fans who voted online. The voting ended on June 5, 2006, and the results were announced in a television special aired on NBA TV the following day.

As the name suggested, all of these moments happened during the NBA playoffs. Forty moments selected happened in the Finals round, with 19 of them happening during the 1980s and 18 of them happening during the 1990s.

== List ==
No.	Moment	Year
1	Jordan jolts Jazz in Game 6 When John Stockton passed the ball to Karl Malone, Michael Jordan pushed the ball away and dribbled to the front. Guarding him was Bryon Russell, one of the Jazz's perimeter defenders. Jordan drove inside the three-point line, executed a quick crossover—possibly pushing off Russell, but the officials did not call a foul—and made a 20-foot jumper to give the Chicago Bulls an 87–86 lead with 5.2 seconds left. The Bulls went on to win the game and captured their sixth title.	Game 6; 1998 NBA Finals
2	Magic fills in at center Los Angeles Lakers captain Kareem Abdul-Jabbar suffered from a sprained ankle in the previous game and could not play. Magic Johnson, who was a rookie at the time, stepped in for Abdul-Jabbar. Though he was a point guard, he eventually played all five positions throughout the game, including Abdul-Jabbar's center position. In the end, he had 42 points, 15 rebounds and 7 assists as the Lakers defeated the Philadelphia 76ers 123–107 to win the NBA championship.	Game 6; 1980 NBA Finals
3	Reed inspires Knicks to victory New York Knicks captain Willis Reed suffered from a torn muscle in his right leg in Game 5, and did not play in Game 6 when Wilt Chamberlain scored 45 points, allowing the Los Angeles Lakers to tie the series. Despite his injury, Reed was determined to play in the decisive Game 7. He took an injection to lessen the pain and entered the game just before tipoff. Reed finished the game with only four points, but his presence alone was able to bring the Knicks to a 113–99 victory and the franchise's first title.	Game 7; 1970 NBA Finals
4	Bird picks Pistons' pockets In this series, the aging defending champion Boston Celtics met the young Detroit Pistons. Near the remaining seconds of Game 5, Boston was down by a point. During an inbound made by Isiah Thomas to Bill Laimbeer, Larry Bird stole the ball. Pivoting just before going out of bounds, he quickly passed it to Dennis Johnson. Johnson laid the ball in to take a 108–107 lead with one second left. The Celtics went on to advance to the finals, where they lost to the Lakers.	Game 5; 1987 Eastern Conference Finals
5	"Havlicek stole the ball!" With five seconds remaining, the Boston Celtics were hanging on to a one-point lead at 110–109 as the Philadelphia 76ers regained possession of the ball. During an inbound made by Hal Greer to Chet Walker, John Havlicek poked the ball away toward Sam Jones, who took possession as time expired. The Celtics won the series and advanced to the finals.	Game 7; 1965 Eastern Division Finals
6	Greatest game ever? Going into the game, the series between the Boston Celtics and the Phoenix Suns was tied 2–2. The game, like the series, was heavily contested as it took three overtime periods to determine the winner. Near the end of the first overtime, Boston's Paul Silas attempted to call a time-out that the team did not have, but officials ignored it and the game was tied. In the second overtime, Phoenix led by one with four seconds left. John Havlicek scored to retake the lead and spectators rushed onto the court to celebrate. Afterward, it was determined that Havlicek scored before the game ended and one second should be added back to the clock. Suns' Paul Westphal, immediately called a time-out that they did not have and a technical free throw was awarded to Boston. Boston was then up by two and Suns' Gar Heard was able to tie with a jumper. A third overtime period was played. With most key players fouled out, reserve players were used. The Celtics' Glenn McDonald scored six points and led Boston to a 128–126 win.	Game 5; 1976 NBA Finals
7	Mr. Clutch sinks a 60-footer With 3 seconds remaining and the score tied at 100, Dave DeBusschere made a basket to put the New York Knicks up two. As the Los Angeles Lakers were out of timeouts, the team had to throw an inbounds pass. Jerry West got the ball, dribbled as far as he dared and sank a 60-foot shot to push the game into overtime. At the end, the Knicks won 111–108. (The three-point line was not implemented until the 1979–80 season, so West's shot was worth only two points instead of three, which would have enabled the Lakers to win in regulation.)	Game 3; 1970 NBA Finals
8	Magic's junior, junior sky hook beats Boston The Celtics were leading 106–105 after Kareem Abdul-Jabbar's missed free throw. Boston lost possession after the ball went out of bounds. Magic Johnson then took an inbound pass and dribbled toward the key. Before Celtics defense could come and stop him, Johnson took a "junior" hook shot – the much taller Kareem's signature shot – to give the Lakers a one-point lead. Larry Bird missed the final shot after hitting a three-point shot with 12 seconds left, and the Lakers won the game, 107–106.	Game 4; 1987 NBA Finals
9	Pettit's revenge During the 1957 NBA Finals, the Boston Celtics defeated the St. Louis Hawks in seven games as Bob Pettit missed a scoring attempt. One year later, they met again in the finals. In the series-clinching sixth game, Pettit redeemed himself by scoring 50 points, bringing the Hawks a win and their only championship to date. Pettit's 50 points matched the NBA record at the time, which has since been broken by Elgin Baylor.	Game 6; 1958 NBA Finals
10	"God disguised as Michael Jordan" Michael Jordan missed most of the Chicago Bulls' regular-season games after breaking a bone in his left foot, but returned in time for the playoffs. He scored 63 points against the Boston Celtics during Game 2. The Celtics eventually won the game and swept the Bulls, but Jordan's 63 points remains the playoffs scoring record.	Game 2; 1986 Eastern Conference First Round
11	Ralph Sampson game winner vs. Lakers Ralph Sampson caught a pass from teammate Rodney McCray in mid-air, turned around and launched the ball toward the basket. The ball hit the front rim, bounced, hit the back rim and rolled into the basket as the game ended. The shot enabled the Houston Rockets to move into the finals, beating the Lakers in a 4–1 upset.	Game 5; 1986 Western Conference Finals
12	Bill Russell's 30-point, 40-rebound performance, Frank Selvy missed shot, Cousy dribbles out clock Frank Selvy missed what could have been the championship-winning shot at the end of regulation and pushed the game into overtime. In the end, the Boston Celtics won 110–107, thanks to Bill Russell's 30 points and 40 rebounds as well as Bob Cousy's time-consuming dribbling around the court.	Game 7; 1962 NBA Finals
13	Isiah, 43 points (25 in 3rd), 8 assists on bad ankle With a severe ankle injury, Isiah Thomas still was able to score 25 points in the third quarter (it remained as the Finals record for points in a single quarter). His effort, however, did not help the Detroit Pistons, as they lost the game and the series to the Los Angeles Lakers.	Game 6; 1988 NBA Finals
14	Julius Erving's ultimate baseline scoop move vs. Lakers With the Philadelphia 76ers down 2–1 in the series, Julius Erving converted a difficult shot to will the Sixers to a 105–102 victory. Erving elevated baseline, went behind the backboard, and then was able to make the reverse layup for the score.	Game 4; 1980 NBA Finals
15	Elgin Baylor's 61-point, 22-rebound performance vs. Celtics Elgin Baylor scored 61 points and notched 22 rebounds against the Celtics. His effort allowed the Los Angeles Lakers to lead the series 3–2, but the Lakers ultimately lost to the Celtics.	Game 5; 1962 NBA Finals
16	Kareem hooks Celtics in 2OT With seven seconds left in the second overtime, John Havlicek scored and brought the Celtics up by one. Oscar Robertson passed the ball to Kareem Abdul-Jabbar, who hit his signature sky hook over his defender Henry Finkel. This gave the Milwaukee Bucks the win and sent the series to Game 7. The Boston Celtics went on to win the series.	Game 6; 1974 NBA Finals
17	MJ flu game Affected by the flu virus, Michael Jordan could barely play in the pivotal Game 5 which was hosted in Utah. Against all odds, however, Jordan was still able to bring the Bulls to a 90–88 win and a 3–2 series lead. He had 38 points and 7 rebounds.	Game 5; 1997 NBA Finals
18	Derek Fisher's miracle shot With 0.4 seconds left in the game, Derek Fisher hit a fade-away jumper from the left corner over Manu Ginóbili at the buzzer. The Los Angeles Lakers won and took a 3–2 series lead.	Game 5; 2004 Western Conference Semifinals
19	Stockton's game winner sends Jazz to Finals In the fourth quarter, John Stockton scored 15 points including a buzzer-beating three-pointer off of a screen by Karl Malone to dispatch the Houston Rockets and send the Utah Jazz into the NBA Finals.	Game 6; 1997 Western Conference Finals
20	Michael Jordan's game-winner over Craig Ehlo/Cavs Catching an inbound pass, Michael Jordan dribbled across the court and hit a game winner over the Cleveland Cavaliers's Craig Ehlo. The spectators were stunned as Jordan celebrated by pumping his fists.	Game 5; 1989 Eastern Conference First Round
21	Nelson's shot, Russell's championship farewell Leading by one at the final minute, Don Nelson got the ball after it was poked away from John Havlicek. He launched a shot at the free throw line. The ball hit the rim and rolled into the basket, giving Boston the win and Bill Russell his 11th title.	Game 7; 1969 NBA Finals
22	Michael Jordan's 3-pointers vs. Blazers Michael Jordan hit a record six three-pointers in the first half of the game against the Portland Trail Blazers. His 35 points in the first half was also the Finals record.	Game 1; 1992 NBA Finals
23	Rookies Heinsohn, Russell and Ramsey lead Celtics to first title After defeating the Celtics in Boston 125–123, the St. Louis Hawks went on to lose the following in double overtime with Bob Pettit missing the final shot. Rookies Tom Heinsohn and Bill Russell were instrumental in leading to a Celtics victory as they combined to have 56 points and 55 rebounds.	Game 7; 1957 NBA Finals
24	Pacers defeat Knicks Down by six points, Reggie Miller scored eight points in an 8.9-second span to lead the Indiana Pacers over the New York Knicks at the Madison Square Garden.	Game 1; 1995 Eastern Conference Semifinals
25	Robert Horry's 3-pointer vs. Pistons Robert Horry's clutch shooting led the Spurs to a win and a 3–2 series lead. He scored all of his points in the fourth quarter and overtime periods, including a three-point shot with 5.8 seconds left. The San Antonio Spurs went on to defeat the Detroit Pistons and win the series.	Game 5; 2005 NBA Finals
26	G. Henderson steal vs. Lakers With 18 seconds remaining, the Boston Celtics were down by two at 111–113 as the Lakers gained possession of the ball. Gerald Henderson then made a crucial steal off of James Worthy and scored the game-tying layup shot. The Celtics went on to win the game and the series.	Game 2; 1984 NBA Finals
27	Nique vs. Bird 4th quarter duel Dominique Wilkins's 47 points was not enough to bring the Atlanta Hawks to victory as Larry Bird scored 20 of his 34 points in the fourth quarter and led the Celtics to a 118–116 win.	Game 7; 1988 Eastern Conference Semifinals
28	Robert Horry's 3-pointer vs. Sacramento In the closing seconds with the Sacramento Kings leading by two, Vlade Divac tried to throw the ball as far away from the basket as possible. But instead, the ball went straight to Robert Horry, who hit a game-winner at the three-point line. The Los Angeles Lakers won the series 4–3.	Game 4; 2002 Western Conference Finals
29	West's steal and winning layup Tied at 115 in the closing seconds, Sam Jones attempted to make an inbound pass to Bob Cousy. However, Jerry West poked the ball away and made a game-winning layup at the buzzer. The Los Angeles Lakers won the game but lost the series in Game 7.	Game 3; 1962 NBA Finals
30	Reggie's 25-point fourth quarter vs. Knicks Reggie Miller had 39 points in the pivotal Game 5 and led the Pacers over the New York Knicks. He hit five three-pointers in the fourth quarter.	Game 5; 1994 Eastern Conference Finals
31	Kareem and Lakers end Boston Garden curse After eight finals defeats in the hand of the Boston Celtics, the Lakers finally got their revenge. Kareem Abdul-Jabbar scored 29 points to clinch the series at the Boston Garden. His performance earned him the Finals MVP.	Game 6; 1985 NBA Finals
32	John Paxson's game winner vs. Suns With the Phoenix Suns up by two with 14.1 seconds remaining in the game, Michael Jordan passed to Scottie Pippen, who passed to Horace Grant. Grant then passed to the waiting John Paxson at the three-point line. Paxson hit the game-winning three to clinch the series for the Chicago Bulls.	Game 6; 1993 NBA Finals
33	Blazermania The Portland Trail Blazers took out the favored Philadelphia 76ers in Game 6 with Bill Walton's 20 points and 23 rebounds performance. The Blazers were down 2–0 before winning four straight to capture the franchise's first title.	Game 6; 1977 NBA Finals
34	Hakeem blocks John Starks and Knicks title quest Near the final seconds of the game, Houston's Hakeem Olajuwon blocked a potential championship-winning three-pointer by John Starks, allowing the Rockets to defeat the New York Knicks. Houston went on to win the series.	Game 6; 1994 NBA Finals
35	Bernard vs. Isiah The Detroit Pistons were able to force overtime with Isiah Thomas's 16 points in the last 90 seconds of the fourth quarter. But his performance was not enough to bring Detroit the win as New York Knicks star Bernard King scored 44 points and notched 12 rebounds, despite having both the flu and dislocated fingers.	Game 5; 1984 Eastern Conference First Round
36	Moses 'Fo, Fo, Fo' Before playoffs began, Moses Malone promised that the team would go "Fo', fo', fo' " (as in four games sweep in all three playoffs rounds). The Philadelphia 76ers in the end went "four, five, four" en route to an NBA title, losing only once to the Milwaukee Bucks.	Game 4; 1983 NBA Finals
37	Shaq flirts with quadruple double on record-setting Lakers In the game, Los Angeles Lakers center Shaquille O'Neal almost notched a quadruple-double with 28 points, 20 rebounds, nine assists and a record-tying eight block shots. His performance led the Lakers to victory over the 76ers.	Game 2; 2001 NBA Finals
38	Celtics 129–125 OT classic over the Lakers Trailing early behind the Los Angeles Lakers, the Boston Celtics struggled until late at the game when Los Angeles made mistakes. Magic Johnson committed a bad pass, and allowed Bird to hit a late fade-away while defending him, and the Celtics forced overtime. During overtime, he and James Worthy missed crucial free throws, allowing the Celtics to win 129–125. The game was also notable for the altercation occurred when Kevin McHale hit Kurt Rambis during a layup attempt and Kareem Abdul-Jabbar fouling out.	Game 4; 1984 NBA Finals
39	Sleepy Floyd 29-point quarter, 39-point half, 51-point game! The Golden State Warriors rallied to overcome a 102–88 deficit and avoided a series sweep in the hands of the Los Angeles Lakers, thanks to Sleepy Floyd, who scored 29 points in the fourth quarter (he had 39 in the second half and 51 in the entire game). The Warriors went on to lose the series.	Game 4; 1987 Western Conference Semifinals
40	Bird triple double, caps off 50–1 record at home Larry Bird led the Boston Celtics to their 16th title over the Houston Rockets with a triple-double of 29 points, 11 rebounds and 12 assists. Also notable was that the Celtics posted a 50–1 home record during the entire season including playoffs.	Game 6; 1986 NBA Finals
41	Michael Jordan switches hands vs. Lakers Michael Jordan led the Chicago Bulls to a series-tying win against the Los Angeles Lakers with a layup shot in the closing minutes. While in mid-air, he switched the ball from right hand to left hand before laying it in the basket. This shot was one of the 13 consecutive field goals he made near the end of the game. He made 15 out of the 18 field goals in the game.	Game 2; 1991 NBA Finals
42	The Microwave heats up; Vinnie Johnson's game winner With 0.7 seconds left, Vinnie Johnson hit the game-winning jumper to give the Detroit Pistons their second straight title. He had seven points in the game-closing 9–0 run.	Game 5; 1990 NBA Finals
43	Kerr's game winner With Michael Jordan heavily guarded by the Utah Jazz, Steve Kerr was left open. His 17-foot game-winning shot brought the Chicago Bulls their fifth championship.	Game 6; 1997 NBA Finals
44	Mikan leads Lakers to 1st NBA title despite broken hand With a broken wrist, George Mikan scored 22 points to bring the Los Angeles Lakers their first championship. Through the ten playoffs games, he scored a total of 303 points.	Game 5; 1949 BAA Finals
45	Wilt's MVP performance secures Lakers place in history After winning 69 games and clinching a 33-game winning streak during the season, the Los Angeles Lakers easily entered the NBA Finals. The New York Knicks had a chance to pull an upset when reports indicated that Wilt Chamberlain would be sidelined by injury. Nevertheless, he entered the game after taking an injection. His double-double (24 points and 29 rebounds) propelled the Lakers to their first title in L.A.	Game 5; 1972 NBA Finals
46	Sam Jones picket fence play Sam Jones led the Boston Celtics to victory with a miraculous game-winning shot. Coming off a screen with seconds remaining on the clock, he was forced to launch a shot. The ball rolled around the rim and dropped into the basket, allowing Boston to tie the series 2–2.	Game 4; 1969 NBA Finals
47	Tim Duncan's MVP performance, near quad double Tim Duncan of the San Antonio Spurs had an MVP performance in this game, helping his team to overcome a nine-point deficit in the final quarter. He recorded eight blocked shots to tie the Finals record. Also notable was the fact that he was two blocks shy of a quadruple-double.	Game 6; 2003 NBA Finals
48	Lakers defeat Blazers On the verge of losing the game and the Western Conference Finals, the Los Angeles Lakers turned the series around with a 29–9 game-closing run in the fourth quarter. They overcame a 15-point deficit and defeated the Portland Trail Blazers 89–84.	Game 7; 2000 Western Conference Finals
49	Warriors upset Bullets The Golden State Warriors completed the ultimate upset in the NBA Finals by winning all four games by a margin of 16 points against the heavily favored Washington Bullets, the team that had home court advantage.	Game 4; 1975 NBA Finals
50	Allan Houston stuns the Heat Allan Houston's short jumper in the final seconds allowed the New York Knicks to win the series over the Miami Heat. The Knicks became the second eight-seeded team to win a playoff series.	Game 5; 1999 Eastern Conference First Round
51	George King secures Nats’ NBA title After hitting a free throw to put the Syracuse Nationals up by one, George King made a steal off of Fort Wayne Pistons's Andy Phillip to secure the win and the championship. After the game, fans rushed the court to celebrate.	Game 7; 1955 NBA Finals
52	Big Game James: Worthy's triple double for Lakers In this decisive Game 7, James Worthy put up his best performance by notching the only triple-double of his career. His 36 points, 16 rebounds and 10 assists allowed the Los Angeles Lakers to repeat as NBA champions for the first time.	Game 7; 1988 NBA Finals
53	Iverson and Sixers shock Lakers The Philadelphia 76ers shocked the Los Angeles Lakers, which had already won 11 playoff games in a row, with an overtime win in Game 1 of the NBA Finals. 76ers’ Allen Iverson had 48 points in this game.	Game 1; 2001 NBA Finals
54	Sean Elliott's Memorial Day miracle On Memorial Day, Sean Elliott of the San Antonio Spurs made a memorable play near the end of the game. After getting a pass from his teammate, Elliott was forced to the sideline when Portland Trail Blazers’ Stacey Augmon rushed toward him in an attempt to poke the ball away. With little time to set himself up, he launched a shot. The ball dropped into the basket, allowing to the Spurs to win the game.	Game 2; 1999 Western Conference Finals
55	Mario Elie kiss of death The Houston Rockets came back from a 3–1 series deficit against the Phoenix Suns to win the series. In the last game of the series, Mario Elie hit a game-winner at the three-point line. After making the shot, he blew a kiss toward the stunned Phoenix fans.	Game 7; 1995 Western Conference Semifinals
56	Bird's mid-air switch vs. Rockets Larry Bird had a memorable play in the fourth quarter against the Houston Rockets. After missing a shot, he grabbed his own rebound with his right hand. He then moved behind the backboard, switched the ball to his left hand and scored.	Game 1; 1981 NBA Finals
57	Smits' game winner caps furious finish The end of this game between the Indiana Pacers and the Orlando Magic was highlighted by a series of lead changes. Down by two points with 13.3 seconds left, Magic's Brian Shaw hit a three-pointer to put his team up. Reggie Miller followed with another three to recapture the lead for the Pacers with 5.2 left. Penny Hardaway hit yet another three to put the Magic up again with 1.3 left. Rik Smits then hit a game-winning two pointer at the buzzer, winning the game for the Pacers.	Game 4; 1995 Eastern Conference Finals
58	Kobe takes over Shaquille O'Neal was fouled out with 2:33 remaining in the overtime period. Kobe Bryant then took over and held off the Pacers. He scored six of the eight final Los Angeles Lakers points. O'Neal also recorded 36 points and 21 rebounds.	Game 4; 2000 NBA Finals
59	Nuggets stun Sonics After trailing 0–2 in the series, the Denver Nuggets won the next three games to defeat the Seattle SuperSonics in one of the biggest upsets in playoffs history. It marked the first time in which the eighth seed beat the first seed in a playoff series.	Game 5; 1994 Western Conference First Round
60 (tie)	Andrew Toney -- ‘The Boston Strangler’—strikes Andrew Toney of the Philadelphia 76ers earned the nickname "The Boston Strangler" when he led the team to a Game 7 win against the Boston Celtics with 34 points. He averaged 26.5 points in the series.	Game 7; 1982 Eastern Conference Finals
60 (tie)	John Starks baseline dunk vs. Bulls With 1:26 remaining in a game against the Chicago Bulls, John Starks made a decisive play to lead the New York Knicks to victory. With the help of Patrick Ewing's screen, Starks drove baseline and dunked the ball over both Horace Grant and Michael Jordan.	Game 2; 1993 Eastern Conference Finals
60 (tie)	Reggie's game-winning 3 vs. Bulls With a sprained ankle, Reggie Miller hit a three over Michael Jordan with 0.7 seconds left to tie the series.	Game 4; 1998 Eastern Conference Finals

== Numbers of moments by decades ==
	First round	Semifinals	Conference Finals	Finals	Total
1940s	—	0	0	1	1
1950s	—	0	0	3	3
1960s	—	0	1	5	6
1970s	—	0	0	7	7
1980s	3	2	3	11	19
1990s	2	2	6	8	18
2000s	0	1	2	5	8
Total	5	5	12	40	62

== Voters ==
Name	Title / media represented
Marv Albert	TNT
Steve Aschburner	AOL.com, Minneapolis Star-Tribune
Rick Barry	Hall of Famer, one of the 50 Greatest Players
Clyde Drexler	Hall of Famer, one of the 50 Greatest Players
David DuPree	USA Today
Walt Frazier	Hall of Famer, one of the 50 Greatest Players
George Gervin	Hall of Famer, one of the 50 Greatest Players
Gail Goodrich	NBA TV, Hall of Famer
Frank Isola	NY Daily News
Phil Jasner	Philadelphia Daily News
Bob Lanier	Hall of Famer
Jack McCallum	Sports Illustrated
Brent Musburger	ABC/ESPN
Scottie Pippen	ABC/ESPN, one of the 50 Greatest Players
Harvey Pollack	76ers Director of Statistical Information
Jack Ramsay	Hall of Famer, ABC/ESPN, one of the Top 10 Coaches in NBA History
Bill Russell	Hall of Famer, one of the 50 Greatest Players
Chris Sheridan	ESPN.com
Bill Simmons	ESPN.com
Kenny Smith	TNT
Sam Smith	Chicago Tribune
Dick Stockton	TNT
Rick Kamla	NBA TV
Peter Vecsey	NY Post
Bill Walton	Hall of Famer, ABC/ESPN, one of the 50 Greatest Players
