= Michael Jordan =

American basketball player and businessman (born 1963)

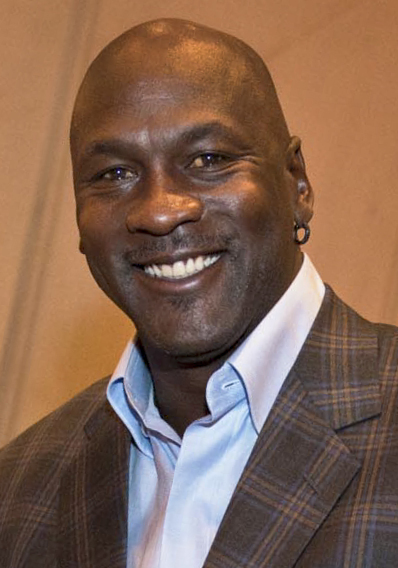
- Jordan in 2014

Personal information
- Born: February 17, 1963 (age 63) New York City, New York, U.S.
- Listed height: 6 ft 6 in (1.98 m)
- Listed weight: 216 lb (98 kg) (Note: Jordan's weight fluctuated from 195 to 218 lb (88 to 99 kg) during the course of his professional career; his NBA listed weight was 216 lb (98 kg).)

Career information
- High school: Emsley A. Laney (Wilmington, North Carolina)
- College: North Carolina (1981–1984)
- NBA draft: 1984: 1st round, 3rd overall pick
- Drafted by: Chicago Bulls
- Playing career: 1984–1993, 1995–1998, 2001–2003
- Position: Shooting guard / small forward
- Number: 23, 12, (Note: Jordan wore a nameless No. 12 jersey in a February 14, 1990, game against the Orlando Magic because his No. 23 jersey had been stolen.) 45

Career history
- 1984–1993, 1995–1998: Chicago Bulls
- 2001–2003: Washington Wizards

Career highlights
- Basketball player: 6× NBA champion (1991–1993, 1996–1998); 6× NBA Finals MVP (1991–1993, 1996–1998); 5× NBA Most Valuable Player (1988, 1991, 1992, 1996, 1998); 14× NBA All-Star (1985–1993, 1996–1998, 2002, 2003); 3× NBA All-Star Game MVP (1988, 1996, 1998); 10× All-NBA First Team (1987–1993, 1996–1998); All-NBA Second Team (1985); NBA Defensive Player of the Year (1988); 9× NBA All-Defensive First Team (1988–1993, 1996–1998); NBA Rookie of the Year (1985); NBA All-Rookie First Team (1985); 10× NBA scoring champion (1987–1993, 1996–1998); 3× NBA steals leader (1988, 1990, 1993); 2× NBA Slam Dunk Contest champion (1987, 1988); No. 23 retired by Chicago Bulls; No. 23 retired by Miami Heat; 3× AP Athlete of the Year (1991–1993); Sports Illustrated Sportsperson of the Year (1991); NBA anniversary team (50th, 75th); NCAA champion (1982); Consensus national college player of the year (1984); 2× Sporting News National Player of the Year (1983, 1984); 2× Consensus first-team All-American (1983, 1984); ACC Player of the Year (1984); ACC Athlete of the Year (1984); 2× First-team All-ACC (1983, 1984); ACC Rookie of the Year (1982); No. 23 retired by North Carolina Tar Heels; 3× USA Basketball Male Athlete of the Year (1983, 1984, 1992 (Note: As part of the 1992 Olympic team)); McDonald's All-American (1981); First-team Parade All-American (1981); NASCAR team owner: NASCAR Cup Series regular season champion (2024); 2× Brickyard 400 champion (2025, 2026); Daytona 500 champion (2026); Other: Presidential Medal of Freedom (2016)

Career NBA statistics
- Points: 32,292 (30.1 ppg)
- Rebounds: 6,672 (6.2 rpg)
- Assists: 5,633 (5.3 apg)
- Stats at NBA.com
- Stats at Basketball Reference
- Basketball Hall of Fame
- FIBA Hall of Fame
Medals
Men's basketball
Representing the United States
Olympic Games
Gold medal – first place	1984 Los Angeles	Men's basketball
Gold medal – first place	1992 Barcelona	Men's basketball
Tournament of the Americas
Gold medal – first place	1992 Portland	Men's basketball
Pan American Games
Gold medal – first place	1983 Caracas	Men's basketball

Michael Jeffrey Jordan (born February 17, 1963), also known by his initials MJ, is an American businessman, former professional basketball player, and former baseball player. He played 15 seasons in the National Basketball Association (NBA) between 1984 and 2003, winning six NBA championships with the Chicago Bulls. Jordan is widely considered to be one of the greatest basketball players of all time, and is regarded as one of the most influential sports figures in history. Throughout the 1980s and 1990s, he was pivotal in popularizing basketball and the NBA internationally.

Jordan played college basketball with the North Carolina Tar Heels. As a freshman, he was a member of the Tar Heels' national championship team in 1982. In 1984, he was the consensus national college player of the year and was selected by the Bulls with the third overall pick of the 1984 NBA draft. With the Bulls, he emerged as a league star known for prolific scoring, defensive prowess and intense competitiveness. His leaping ability, demonstrated by performing slam dunks from the free-throw line in Slam Dunk Contests, earned him the nicknames "Air Jordan" and "His Airness". Jordan won his first NBA title with the Bulls in 1991 and followed that with titles in 1992 and 1993, securing a three-peat.

Citing exhaustion from basketball and superstardom, Jordan abruptly retired before the 1993–94 season to play Minor League Baseball in the Chicago White Sox organization. He returned to the Bulls in 1995 and led them to three more championships in 1996, 1997, and 1998, as well as a then-record 72 regular season wins in the 1995–96 season. Jordan retired for the second time in 1999, then returned for two NBA seasons from 2001 to 2003 as a member of the Washington Wizards. He was selected to play for the United States national team during his college and NBA careers, winning four gold medals—at the 1983 Pan American Games, 1984 Summer Olympics, 1992 Tournament of the Americas and 1992 Summer Olympics—while also being undefeated.

Jordan's individual NBA accolades include six Finals Most Valuable Player (MVP) awards, 10 scoring titles (both all-time records), five MVP awards, a Defensive Player of the Year award, 10 All-NBA First Team designations, nine All-Defensive First Team honors, 14 All-Star Game selections, and three All-Star Game MVP awards. He holds the NBA records for career regular season scoring average (30.1 points per game) and career playoff scoring average (33.4 points per game). Jordan was named the 20th century's greatest North American athlete by ESPN and was second on the Associated Press' list of athletes of the century. Jordan was twice inducted into the Naismith Basketball Hall of Fame, in 2009 for his individual career, and in 2010 as part of the 1992 U.S. men's Olympic basketball team ("The Dream Team"). The trophy for the NBA Most Valuable Player Award is named in his honor.

One of the most effectively marketed athletes in history, Jordan made many product endorsements and fueled the success of Nike's Air Jordan sneakers. He starred as himself in the film Space Jam (1996) and was the focus of the Emmy-winning documentary series The Last Dance (2020). He became part-owner and head of basketball operations for the Charlotte Hornets (then named the Bobcats) in 2006 and bought a controlling interest in 2010, before selling his majority stake in 2023. Jordan is a co-owner of 23XI Racing in the NASCAR Cup Series. He is the wealthiest athlete of all time with official records, and one of the world's richest celebrities, with a $4.7 billion net worth as of 2026. In 2016, U.S. president Barack Obama awarded Jordan the Presidential Medal of Freedom.

== Early life ==
Michael Jeffrey Jordan was born on February 17, 1963, at Cumberland Hospital in the Fort Greene neighborhood of Brooklyn, New York City, to bank employee Deloris (née Peoples) and equipment supervisor James R. Jordan Sr. He has two older brothers, James Jr. and Larry, an older sister named Deloris and a younger sister named Roslyn. The children were raised Methodist.

In 1968, the family moved to Wilmington, North Carolina. Jordan attended Emsley A. Laney High School, where he played basketball, baseball, and football. He tried out for the basketball varsity team during his sophomore year, but at a height of 5 feet 11 inches (1.80 m), he was deemed too short. Motivated to prove his worth, Jordan became the star of Laney's junior varsity team and tallied several 40-point games. The following summer, he grew four inches (10 cm) and trained rigorously. Upon earning a spot on the varsity roster, Jordan averaged more than 25 points per game (ppg) over his final two seasons of high school play. He also adopted his signature jersey number, 23. During his senior season, his per-game averages were 26.8 points, 11.6 rebounds, and 10.1 assists. He scored 30 points at the 1981 McDonald's All-American Game, a record that stood for 18 years.

Jordan was recruited by numerous college basketball programs, including Duke, North Carolina, North Carolina State, South Carolina, Syracuse, Virginia, Maryland and Clemson. In 1980, he accepted a basketball scholarship to the University of North Carolina at Chapel Hill. Jordan was interested in becoming a meteorologist, and majored in cultural geography because of its relationship to meteorology. (Note: Attributed to multiple references:)

== College career ==
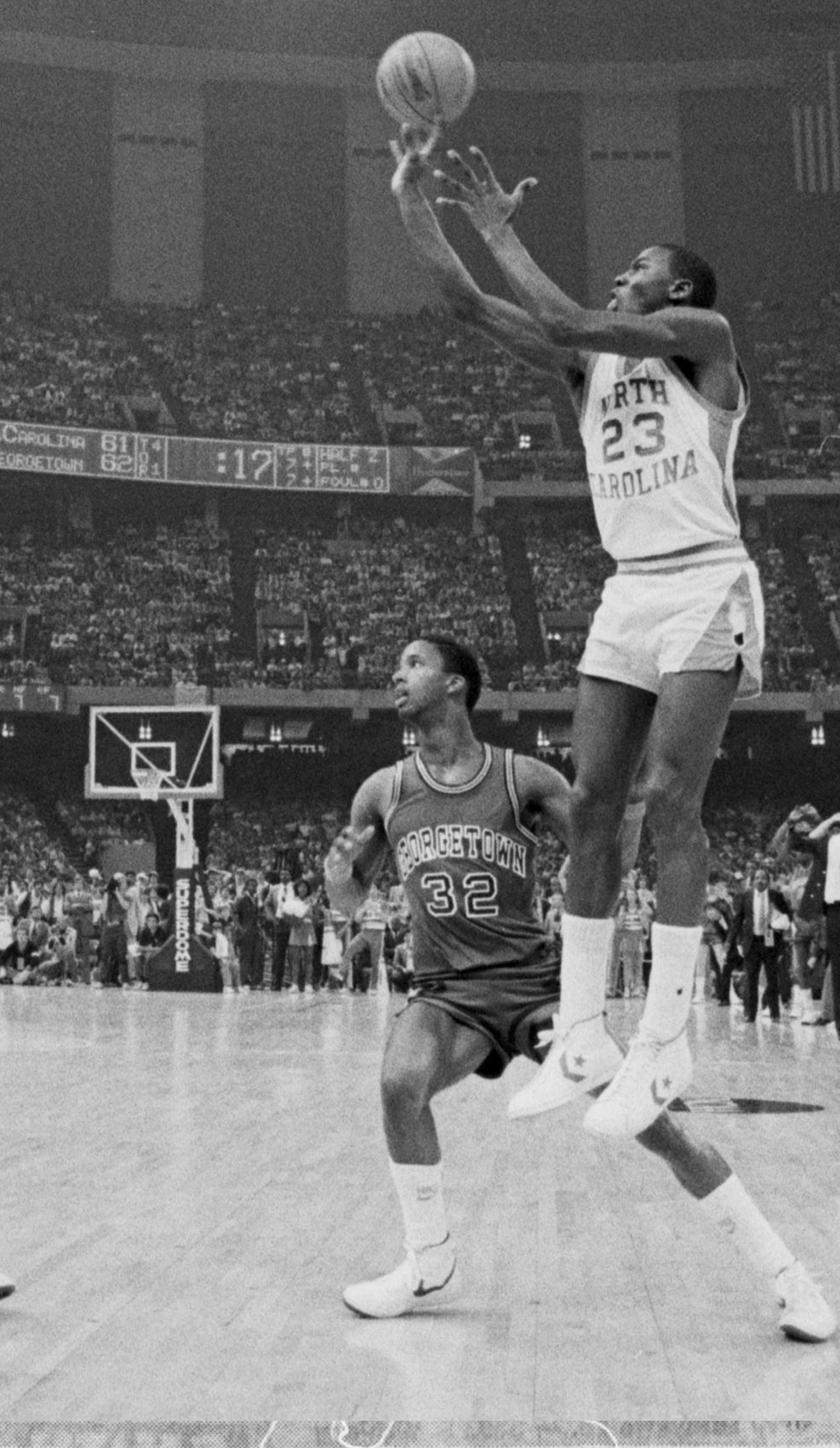
Jordan hitting the game winning shot against Georgetown in the 1982 NCAA championship game

As a freshman under coach Dean Smith's team-oriented system, Jordan was named ACC Freshman of the Year after averaging 13.4 points per game on 53.4% shooting—ranking 10th in scoring and sixth in field goal percentage in the conference. He made the game-winning jump shot in the 1982 NCAA Championship game against Georgetown, which was led by future NBA rival Patrick Ewing. Jordan later described this shot as the major turning point in his basketball career. During his sophomore and junior seasons, Jordan consistently ranked among the ACC's elite, finishing either 1st or 2nd in both total points and points per game, while also placing in the top 10 in field goal percentage and free throw percentage. In his three seasons with the Tar Heels, Jordan averaged 17.7 ppg on 54.0% shooting and added 5.0 rpg and 1.8 apg.

Jordan was selected by consensus to the NCAA All-American First Team in both his sophomore (1983) and junior (1984) seasons. After winning the Naismith and the Wooden College Player of the Year awards in 1984, Jordan left North Carolina a year before his scheduled graduation to enter the 1984 NBA draft. Jordan returned to North Carolina to complete his degree in 1986, when he graduated with a Bachelor of Arts degree in geography. In 2002, Jordan was selected to the ACC 50th Anniversary men's basketball team and named the greatest athlete in ACC history.

== Professional career ==
=== Chicago Bulls (1984–1993; 1995–1998) ===
==== Early NBA years (1984–1987) ====
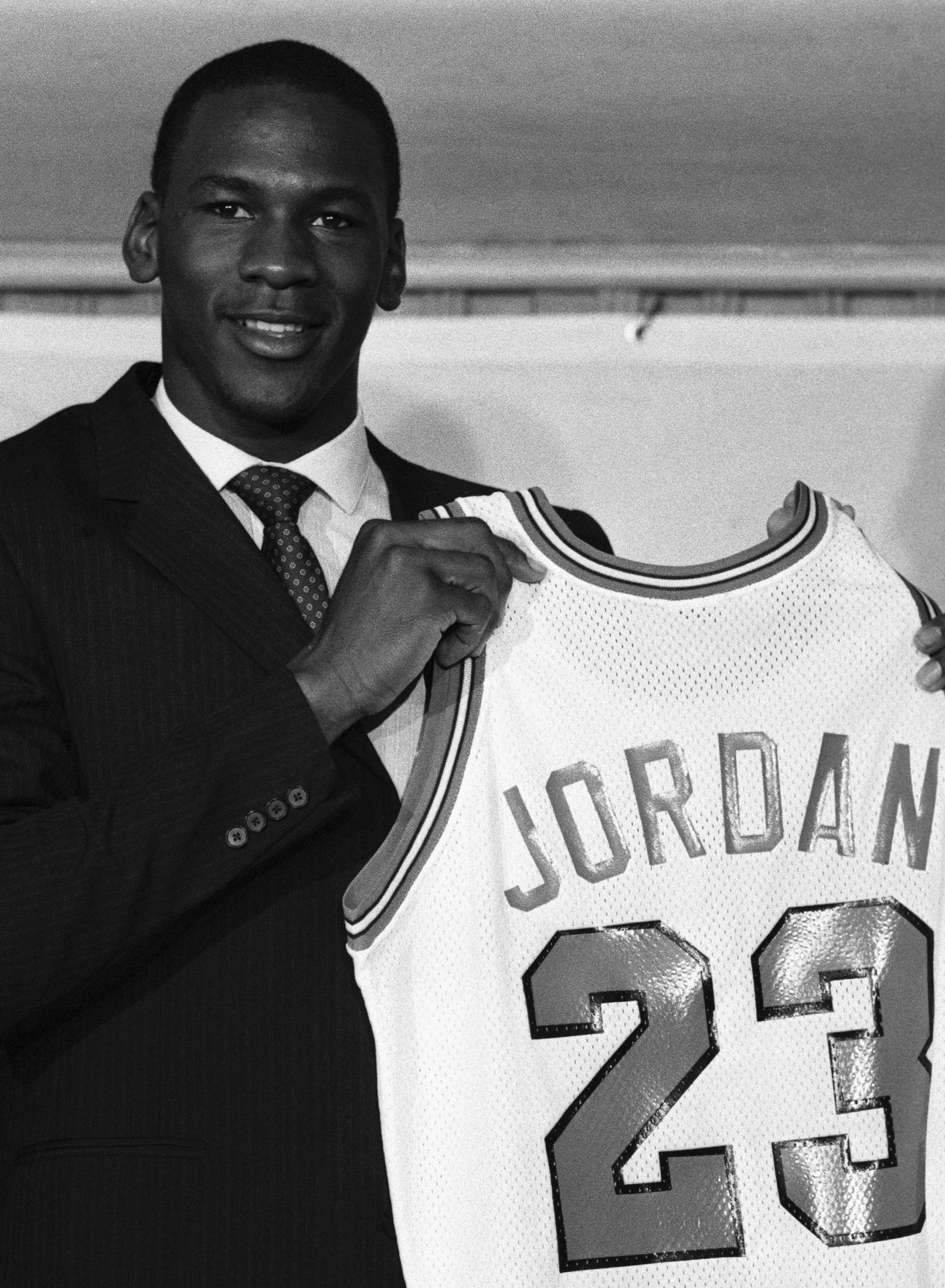
Jordan holding his Chicago Bulls jersey at conference announcing his signing.

The Chicago Bulls selected Jordan with the third overall pick of the 1984 NBA draft after Hakeem Olajuwon (Houston Rockets) and Sam Bowie (Portland Trail Blazers). One of the primary reasons why Jordan was not drafted sooner was because the first two teams were in need of a center. Trail Blazers general manager Stu Inman contended that it was not a matter of drafting a center but more a matter of taking Bowie over Jordan, in part because Portland already had Clyde Drexler, who was a guard with similar skills to Jordan. Citing Bowie's injury-laden college career, ESPN named the Blazers' choice of Bowie as the worst draft pick in North American professional sports history.

Jordan made his NBA debut at Chicago Stadium on October 26, 1984, and scored 16 points. In 2021, a ticket stub from the game sold at auction for $264,000, setting a record for a collectible ticket stub. During his rookie 1984–85 season with the Bulls, Jordan averaged 28.2 ppg on 51.5% shooting. He helped the Bulls improve from 27–55 to 38–44 and qualify for the postseason for the first time since the 1980–81 season. Jordan quickly became a fan favorite even in opposing arenas. Roy S. Johnson of The New York Times described Jordan as "the phenomenal rookie of the Bulls" in November, and he appeared on the cover of Sports Illustrated with the heading "A Star Is Born" in December. The fans voted in Jordan as an All-Star starter during his rookie season. Controversy arose before the 1985 NBA All-Star Game when word surfaced that several veteran players, led by Isiah Thomas, were upset by the amount of attention Jordan was receiving. This led to a so-called "freeze-out" on Jordan, where players refused to pass the ball to him. The controversy left Jordan relatively unaffected when he returned to regular season play, and he would go on to be voted the NBA Rookie of the Year. The Bulls lost to the Milwaukee Bucks in four games in the first round of the playoffs.

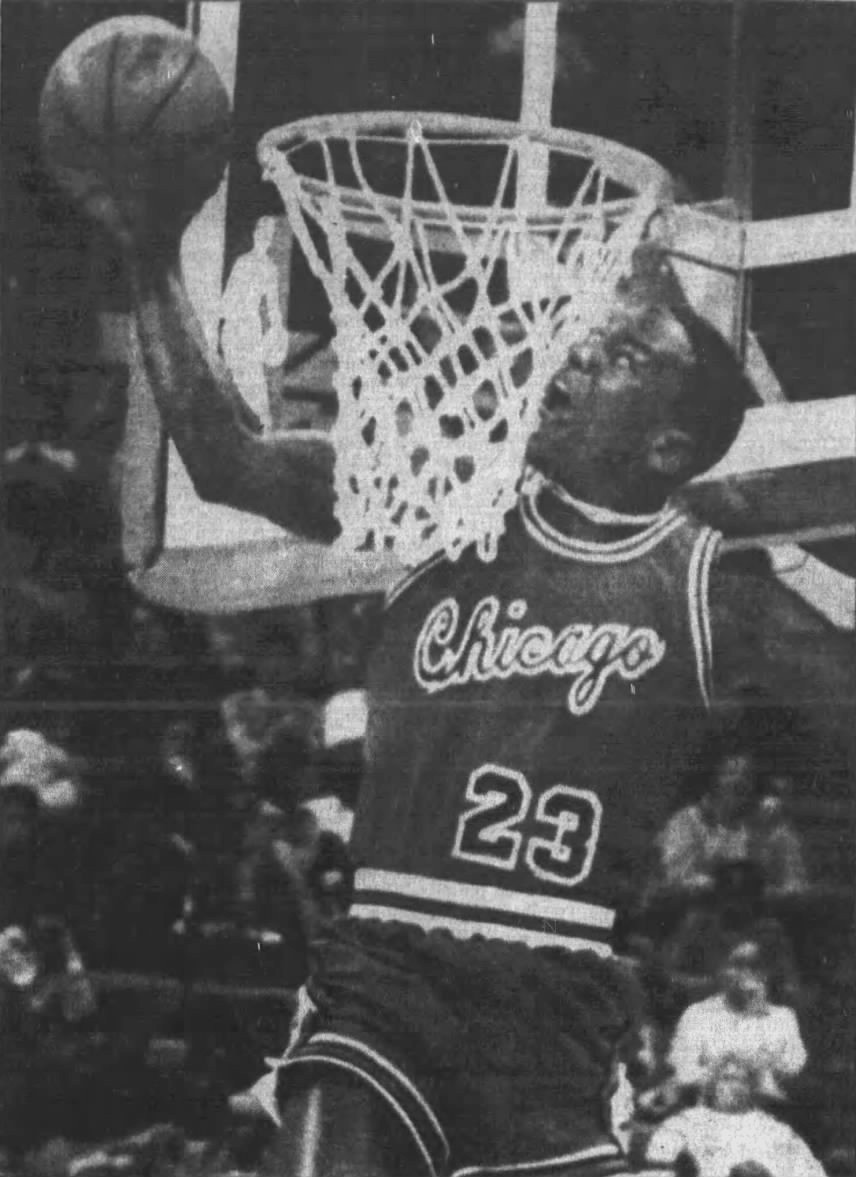
Jordan competing in the 1985 Slam Dunk Contest

An often-cited moment was on August 26, 1985, when Jordan shook the arena during a Nike exhibition game in Trieste, Italy, by shattering the glass of the backboard with a dunk. The moment was filmed and is often referred to as an important milestone in Jordan's rise. The shoes Jordan wore during the game were auctioned in August 2020 for $615,000, a record for a pair of sneakers. Jordan's 1985–86 season was cut short when he broke his foot in the third game of the year, causing him to miss 64 games. The Bulls made the playoffs despite Jordan's injury and a 30–52 record, at the time the fifth-worst record of any team to qualify for the playoffs in NBA history. Jordan recovered in time to participate in the postseason and performed well upon his return. On April 20 at the Boston Garden, in Game 2 of the First Round, a 135–131 double overtime loss to the Boston Celtics, Jordan scored a playoff career-high 63 points, breaking Elgin Baylor's single-game playoff scoring record. The Celtics swept the series in three games.

Jordan completely recovered in time for the 1986–87 season, and had one of the most prolific scoring seasons in NBA history; he became the only player other than Wilt Chamberlain to score 3,000 points in a season, averaging a league-high 37.1 ppg on 48.2% shooting. Jordan also demonstrated his defensive prowess, as he became the first player in NBA history to record 200 steals and 100 blocked shots in a season. Despite Jordan's success, Magic Johnson won the NBA Most Valuable Player Award. The Bulls reached 40 wins, and advanced to the playoffs for the third consecutive year but were again swept by the Celtics.

==== Pistons roadblock (1987–1990) ====
Jordan led the league in scoring during the 1987–88 season, averaging 35.0 ppg on 53.5% shooting, and won his first league MVP Award. He was named the NBA Defensive Player of the Year after averaging 1.6 blocks per game (bpg), a league-high 3.2 steals per game (spg), (Note: A 2024 study by Tom Haberstroh found that Jordan was credited with several steals during the season which did not and could not have taken place. For example, during several home games, Jordan was credited with more steals than the opposing team had live-ball turnovers.) and leading the Bulls defense to the fewest points per game allowed in the league. The Bulls finished 50–32, and made it past the first round of the playoffs for the first time in Jordan's career, as they defeated the Cleveland Cavaliers in five games. In the Eastern Conference Semifinals, the Bulls lost in five games to the more experienced Detroit Pistons, who were led by Isiah Thomas and a group of physical players known as the "Bad Boys".

In the 1988–89 season, Jordan again led the league in scoring, averaging 32.5 ppg on 53.8% shooting from the field, along with 8.0 rpg and 8.0 apg. During the season, Jordan expressed his frustration over the Bulls' offense with head coach Doug Collins, who then put Jordan at point guard. In his time as a point guard, Jordan had 10 triple-doubles in 11 games, with averages of 33.6 ppg, 11.4 rpg, and 10.8 apg.

The Bulls finished with a 47–35 record, and advanced to the Eastern Conference Finals, defeating the Cavaliers and New York Knicks along the way. The Cavaliers series included a career highlight for Jordan when he hit "The Shot" over Craig Ehlo at the buzzer in the fifth and final game of the series. In the Eastern Conference Finals, the Pistons again defeated the Bulls, this time in six games, by utilizing their "Jordan Rules" method of guarding Jordan, which consisted of double and triple teaming him every time he touched the ball.

The Bulls entered the 1989–90 season as a team on the rise, with their core group of Jordan and young improving players like Scottie Pippen and Horace Grant and under the guidance of new coach Phil Jackson. On March 28, 1990, Jordan scored a career-high 69 points in a 117–113 road win over the Cavaliers. He averaged a league-leading 33.6 ppg on 52.6% shooting, to go with 6.9 rpg and 6.3 apg, in leading the Bulls to a 55–27 record. They again advanced to the Eastern Conference Finals after beating the Bucks and Philadelphia 76ers; despite pushing the series to seven games, the Bulls lost to the Pistons for the third consecutive season.

==== First three-peat (1991–1993) ====
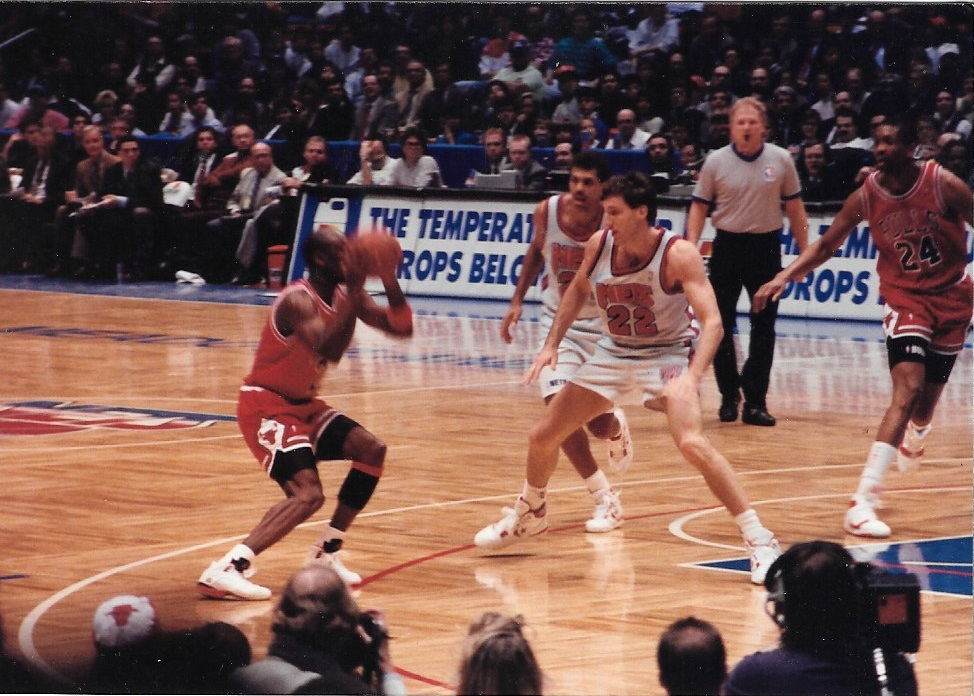
Jordan during a game against the New Jersey Nets on January 23, 1991

After the Bulls' previous losses to the Pistons, Phil Jackson, along with assistant coach Tex Winter, focused on implementing the triangle offense to counteract the Pistons' defense and other teams that heavily targeted Jordan. This system, however, required Jordan to adjust his playing style. In his book Eleven Rings, Jackson recalled, "I was planning to ask Michael to reduce the number of shots he took so that other members of the team could get more involved in the offense. I knew this would be a challenge for him." In The Last Dance, Jordan admitted he was initially reluctant to back the system. Nevertheless, he eventually embraced the change, which led to success for the team.

In the 1990–91 season, Jordan won his second MVP award after averaging 31.5 ppg on 53.9% shooting, 6.0 rpg, and 5.5 apg for the regular season. The Bulls finished in first place in their division for the first time in sixteen years and set a franchise record with 61 wins in the regular season. With Scottie Pippen developing into an All-Star, the Bulls had elevated their play. The Bulls defeated the New York Knicks and the Philadelphia 76ers in the opening two rounds of the playoffs. They advanced to the Eastern Conference Finals, where their rival, the Detroit Pistons, awaited them; this time, the Bulls beat the Pistons in a four-game sweep.

The Bulls advanced to the Finals for the first time in franchise history to face the Los Angeles Lakers. The Bulls won the series in five games and compiled a 15–2 playoff record along the way. Perhaps the best-known moment of the series came in Game 2 when, attempting a dunk, Jordan avoided a potential Sam Perkins block by switching the ball from his right hand to his left in mid-air to lay the shot into the basket. In his first Finals appearance, Jordan had 31.2 ppg on 56% shooting from the field, 11.4 apg, 6.6 rpg, 2.8 spg, and 1.4 bpg. Jordan won his first NBA Finals MVP award and cried while holding the Finals trophy.

Jordan and the Bulls continued their dominance in the 1991–92 season, establishing a 67–15 record, topping their franchise record from the 1990–91 campaign. Jordan won his second consecutive MVP award with averages of 30.1 ppg, 6.4 rpg, and 6.1 apg on 52% shooting. After winning a physical seven-game series over the New York Knicks in the second round of the playoffs and finishing off the Cleveland Cavaliers in the Conference Finals in six games, the Bulls met Clyde Drexler and the Portland Trail Blazers in the Finals. The media, hoping to recreate a Magic–Bird rivalry, highlighted the similarities between "Air" Jordan and Clyde "The Glide" during the pre-Finals hype.

In a Game 1 victory, Jordan scored a Finals-record 35 points in the first half, including a record-setting six three-point field goals. After the sixth three-pointer, he jogged down the court shrugging as he looked courtside. Marv Albert, who broadcast the game, later stated that it was as if Jordan was saying: "I can't believe I'm doing this." The Bulls went on to defeat the Blazers in six games. Jordan was named Finals MVP for the second year in a row, and finished the series averaging 35.8 ppg, 4.8 rpg, and 6.5 apg, while shooting 52.6% from the floor.

In the 1992–93 season, despite a 32.6 ppg, 6.7 rpg, and 5.5 apg campaign, including a second-place finish in Defensive Player of the Year voting, Jordan's streak of consecutive MVP seasons ended, as he lost the award to his friend Charles Barkley, upsetting him. Jordan and the Bulls met Barkley and his Phoenix Suns in the 1993 NBA Finals. The Bulls won their third NBA championship on a game-winning shot by John Paxson and a last-second block by Horace Grant, but Jordan was once again Chicago's leader. He averaged a Finals-record 41.0 ppg during the six-game series, and became the first player in NBA history to win three consecutive Finals MVP awards. Jordan scored more than 30 points in every game of the series, including 40 or more points in four consecutive games. With his third Finals triumph, Jordan capped off a seven-year run where he attained seven scoring titles and three championships, but there were signs that Jordan was tiring of his massive celebrity and all of the non-basketball hassles in his life.

==== First retirement and stint in Minor League Baseball (1993–1995) ====
Michael Jordan
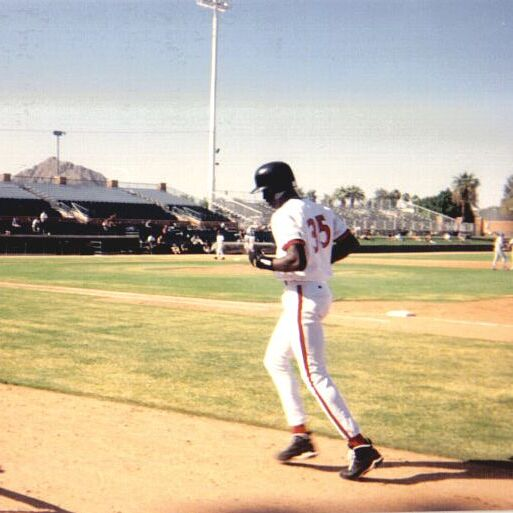
- Jordan in training with the Scottsdale Scorpions in 1994

Birmingham Barons – No. 45, 35
- Outfielder
- Batted: Right Threw: Right

Professional debut
- Southern League: April 8, 1994, for the Birmingham Barons
- Arizona Fall League: October 6, 1994, for the Scottsdale Scorpions

Last Southern League appearance
- March 10, 1995, for the Birmingham Barons

Southern League statistics (through 1994)
- Batting average: .202
- Home runs: 3
- Runs batted in: 51

Arizona Fall League statistics
- Batting average: .252
- Runs batted in: 8
- Stats at Baseball Reference

Teams
- Birmingham Barons (1994–1995); Scottsdale Scorpions (1994)

On October 6, 1993, Jordan announced his retirement, saying that he lost his desire to play basketball. He later said that the murder of his father three months earlier helped shape his decision. James R. Jordan Sr. was murdered on July 23, 1993, at a highway rest area in Lumberton, North Carolina, by two teenagers, Daniel Green and Larry Martin Demery, who carjacked his Lexus. His body, dumped in a South Carolina swamp, was not discovered until August 3. Green and Demery were sentenced to life imprisonment. However, in The Last Dance, Jordan stated that he retired due to physical and mental exhaustion from basketball and superstardom.

Jordan was close to his father; as a child, Jordan imitated the way his father stuck out his tongue while absorbed in work. Jordan later adopted it as his own signature, often displaying it as he drove to the basket. In 1996, Jordan founded a Chicago-area Boys & Girls Club and dedicated it to his father. In his 1998 autobiography For the Love of the Game, Jordan wrote that he was preparing for retirement as early as the summer of 1992. The added exhaustion due to the "Dream Team" run in the 1992 Summer Olympics solidified Jordan's feelings about the game and his celebrity status. Jordan's announcement sent shock waves throughout the NBA and appeared on the front pages of newspapers around the world.

Jordan further surprised the sports world by signing a Minor League Baseball (MiLB) contract with the Chicago White Sox on February 7, 1994. He reported to spring training in Sarasota, Florida, and was assigned to the team's minor league system on March 31. Jordan said that this decision was made to pursue the dream of his late father, who always envisioned his son as a Major League Baseball (MLB) player. The White Sox were owned by Bulls owner Jerry Reinsdorf, who continued to honor Jordan's basketball contract during the years he played baseball.

In 1994, Jordan played for the Birmingham Barons, a Double-A minor league affiliate of the Chicago White Sox, batting .202 with three home runs, 51 runs batted in, 30 stolen bases, 114 strikeouts, 51 bases on balls, and 11 errors. His strikeout total led the team and his games played tied for the team lead. His 30 stolen bases were second on the team only to Doug Brady. Jordan also appeared for the Scottsdale Scorpions in the 1994 Arizona Fall League, batting .252 against the top prospects in baseball. On November 1, 1994, his No. 23 was retired by the Bulls in a ceremony that included the erection of a permanent sculpture known as The Spirit outside the new United Center.

==== Return to the NBA (1995) ====
The Bulls went 55–27 in 1993–94 without Jordan in the lineup and lost to the New York Knicks in the second round of the playoffs. In March 1995, Jordan decided to quit baseball because he feared he might become a replacement player during the Major League Baseball strike. During the 1994–95 season, Jordan returned to the Bulls midway through the season. On March 18, 1995, Jordan announced his comeback to the NBA in a two-word press release: "I'm back." The next day, Jordan took to the court with the Bulls to face the Indiana Pacers in Indianapolis, scoring 19 points. The game had the highest Nielsen rating of any regular season NBA game since 1975. Although he could have worn his original number even though the Bulls retired it, Jordan wore No. 45, his baseball number.

Despite his 18-month hiatus from the NBA, Jordan played well, making a game-winning jump shot against Atlanta in his fourth game back. He scored 55 points in his next game, against the New York Knicks at Madison Square Garden on March 28, 1995. Boosted by Jordan's comeback, the Bulls went 13–4 to make the playoffs and advanced to the Eastern Conference Semifinals against the Orlando Magic. At the end of Game 1, Orlando's Nick Anderson stripped Jordan from behind, leading to the game-winning basket for the Magic; he later commented that Jordan "didn't look like the old Michael Jordan", and said, "No. 45 doesn't explode like No. 23 used to".

Jordan responded by scoring 38 points in the next game, which Chicago won. Before the game, Jordan decided that he would immediately resume wearing his former No. 23. The Bulls were fined $25,000 for failing to report the impromptu number change to the NBA. Jordan was fined an additional $5,000 for opting to wear white sneakers when the rest of the Bulls wore black. He averaged 31 ppg in the playoffs, but Orlando won the series in six games.

==== Second three-peat (1996–1998) ====
Jordan was motivated by the playoff defeat, and he trained aggressively for the 1995–96 season. The Bulls were strengthened by the addition of rebound specialist Dennis Rodman, and the team dominated the league, starting the season at 41–3. The Bulls finished with the best regular season record in NBA history, 72–10, a mark broken two decades later by the 2015–16 Golden State Warriors. Jordan led the league in scoring with 30.4 ppg, and he won the league's regular season and All-Star Game MVP awards.

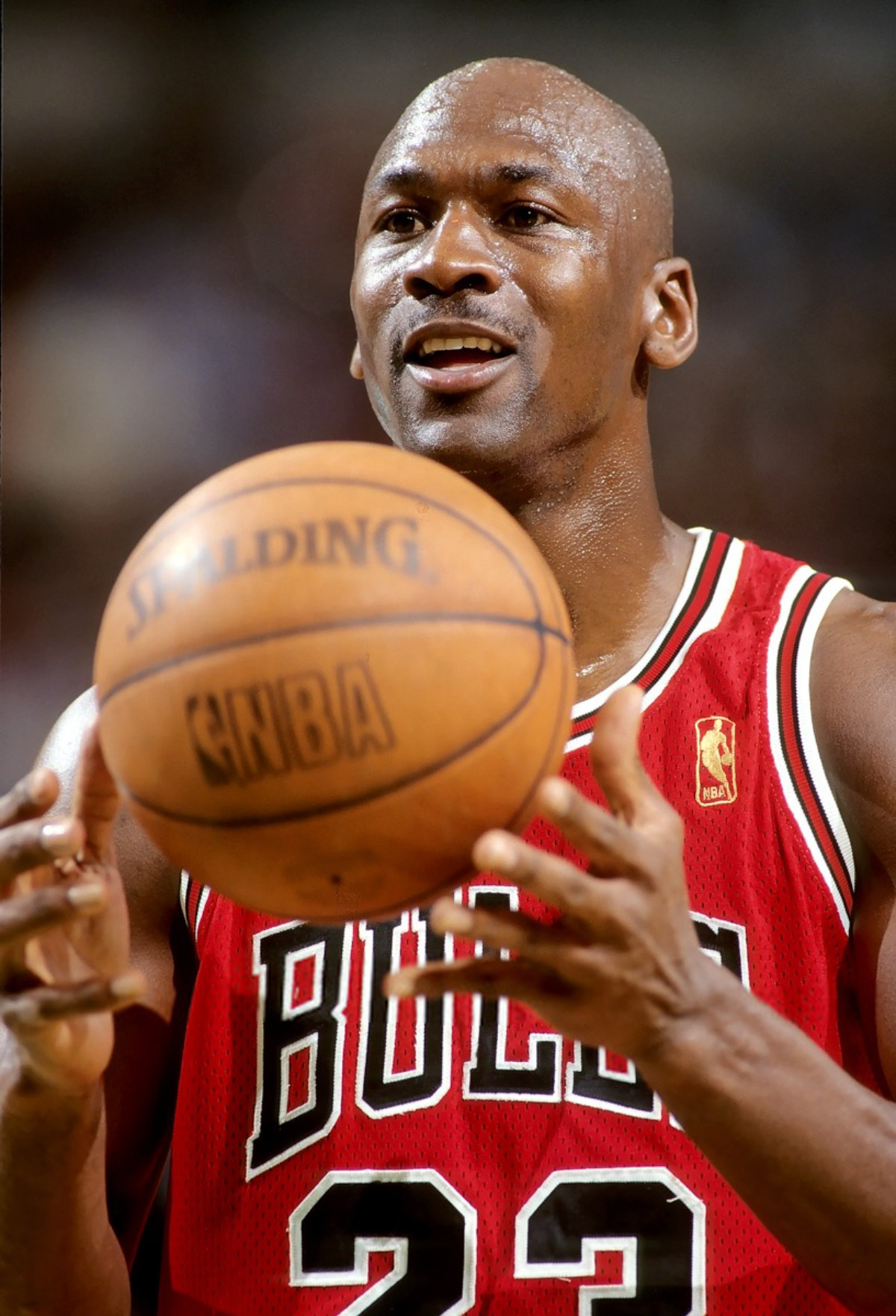
Jordan preparing to shoot a free throw in 1997.

In the playoffs, the Bulls lost only three games in four series (Miami Heat 3–0, New York Knicks 4–1, and Orlando Magic 4–0), as they defeated the Seattle SuperSonics 4–2 in the NBA Finals to win their fourth championship. The series was one of the tougher ones for Jordan as he had a 41.5% field goal percentage, and his scoring average dropped nearly nine points from his average during the rest of the playoffs. Nevertheless, Jordan was named Finals MVP for a record fourth time; he achieved only the second sweep of the MVP awards in the All-Star Game, regular season, and NBA Finals after Willis Reed in the 1969–70 season. Upon winning the championship, his first since his father's murder, Jordan reacted emotionally, clutching the game ball and crying on the locker room floor.

In the 1996–97 season, the Bulls stood at a 69–11 record but ended the season by losing their final two games to finish the year 69–13, missing out on a second consecutive 70-win season. The Bulls again advanced to the Finals, where they faced the Utah Jazz. That team included Karl Malone, who had beaten Jordan for the NBA MVP award in a tight race (986–957). The series against the Jazz featured two of the more memorable clutch moments of Jordan's career. He won Game 1 for the Bulls with a buzzer-beating jump shot. In Game 5, with the series tied 2–2, Jordan played despite being feverish and dehydrated from a stomach virus or food poisoning, likely caused by a pizza ordered the night before. Jordan eventually claimed it was food poisoning in the 2020 docuseries The Last Dance. In what is known as "The Flu Game", Jordan scored 38 points, including the game-winning three-pointer with 25 seconds remaining. The Bulls won 90–88 and went on to win the series in six games. For the fifth time in as many Finals appearances, Jordan received the Finals MVP award. During the 1997 NBA All-Star Game, he posted the first triple-double in All-Star Game history in a victorious effort, but the MVP award went to Glen Rice.

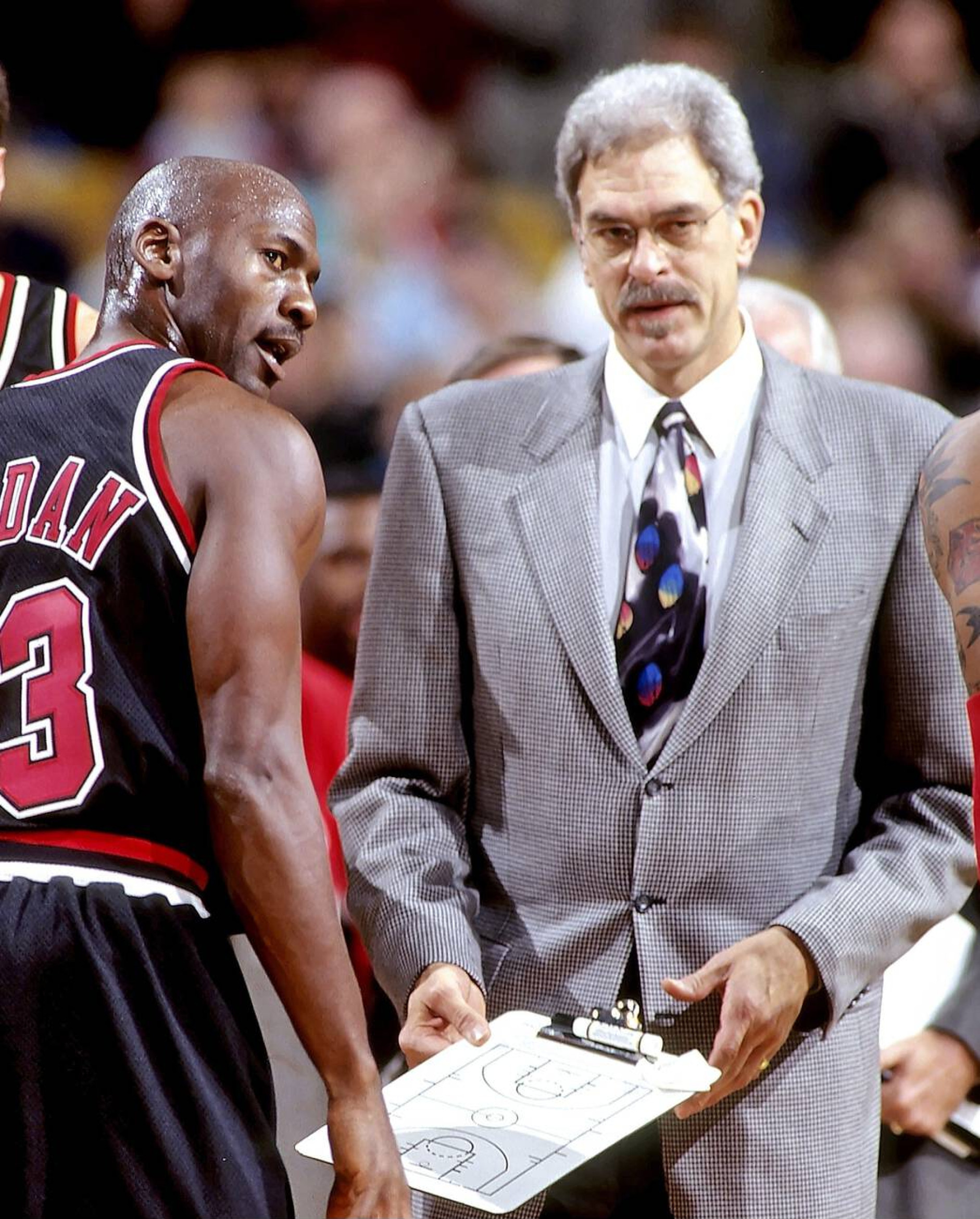
Jordan with coach Phil Jackson in 1997

The Bulls compiled a 62–20 record in the 1997–98 season. Jordan led the league with 28.7 ppg, securing his fifth regular season MVP award, plus honors for All-NBA First Team, First Defensive Team, and the All-Star Game MVP. The Bulls won the Eastern Conference Championship for a third straight season, including surviving a seven-game series with the Indiana Pacers in the Eastern Conference Finals; it was the first time Jordan had played in a Game 7 since the 1992 Eastern Conference Semifinals with the New York Knicks. After winning, they moved on for a rematch with the Jazz in the Finals.

In Game 6 in Utah, Jordan scored 45 points, setting a Finals record for the most points in a championship-clinching game on the road (later tied by Jalen Brunson in 2026). He executed a series of plays considered to be one of the greatest clutch performances in NBA Finals history. With 41.9 seconds remaining and the Bulls trailing 86–83, Phil Jackson called a timeout. When play resumed, Jordan received the inbound pass, drove to the basket, and sank a shot over several Jazz defenders, cutting Utah's lead to 86–85. The Jazz brought the ball upcourt and passed the ball to Malone, who was set up in the low post and was being guarded by Rodman. Malone jostled with Rodman and caught the pass, but Jordan cut behind him and stole the ball out of his hands.

Jordan then dribbled down the court and paused, eyeing his defender, Jazz guard Bryon Russell. With 10 seconds remaining, Jordan started to dribble right, then crossed over to his left, possibly pushing off Russell, although the officials did not call a foul. With 5.2 seconds left, Jordan made the climactic shot of his Bulls career, a top-key jumper over a stumbling Russell to give Chicago an 87–86 lead. After John Stockton missed a game-winning three-pointer, the Bulls won their sixth NBA championship, achieving a three-peat for the second time. With averages of 33.5 points, 4.0 rebounds, and 2.3 assists, Jordan was voted the Finals MVP for a record sixth time. The 1998 Finals holds the highest television rating of any Finals series, and Game 6 holds the highest television rating of any game in NBA history.

==== Second retirement (1999–2001) ====
With Phil Jackson's contract expiring, the pending departures of Scottie Pippen and Dennis Rodman looming, and being in the latter stages of an owner-induced lockout of NBA players, Jordan retired for the second time on January 13, 1999. On January 19, 2000, Jordan returned to the NBA not as a player but as part owner and president of basketball operations for the Washington Wizards. Jordan's responsibilities with the Wizards were comprehensive, as he controlled all aspects of the Wizards' basketball operations, and had the final say in all personnel matters; opinions of Jordan as a basketball executive were mixed. He managed to purge the team of several highly paid, unpopular players (like forward Juwan Howard and point guard Rod Strickland) but used the first pick in the 2001 NBA draft to select high school student Kwame Brown, who did not live up to expectations and was traded away after four seasons.

Despite his January 1999 claim that he was "99.9% certain" he would never play another NBA game, Jordan expressed interest in making another comeback in the summer of 2001, this time with his new team. Inspired by the NHL comeback of his friend Mario Lemieux the previous winter, Jordan spent much of the spring and summer of 2001 in training, holding several invitation-only camps for NBA players in Chicago. Jordan hired his old Chicago Bulls head coach, Doug Collins, as Washington's coach for the upcoming season, a decision that many saw as foreshadowing another Jordan return.

=== Washington Wizards (2001–2003) ===
On September 25, 2001, Jordan announced his return to the NBA to play for the Washington Wizards, indicating his intention to donate his salary as a player to a relief effort for the victims of the September 11 attacks. In an injury-plagued 2001–02 season, Jordan led the team in scoring (22.9 ppg), assists (5.2 apg), and steals (1.4 spg), and was an MVP candidate, as he led the Wizards to a winning record and playoff contention; Jordan would eventually finish 13th in the MVP ballot. After he suffered torn cartilage in his right knee, and subsequent knee soreness, the Wizards missed the playoffs, and Jordan's season ended after only 60 games, the fewest he had played in a regular season since playing 17 games after returning from his first retirement during the 1994–95 season. Jordan started 53 of his 60 games for the season, averaging 24.3 ppg, 5.4 apg, and 6.0 rpg, and shooting 41.9% from the field in his 53 starts. His last seven appearances were in a reserve role, in which he averaged just over 20 minutes per game. The Wizards finished the season with a 37–45 record, an 18-game improvement.

Playing in his 14th and final NBA All-Star Game in 2003, Jordan passed Kareem Abdul-Jabbar as the all-time leading scorer in All-Star Game history, a record since broken by Kobe Bryant and LeBron James. That year, Jordan was the only Washington player to play in all 82 games, starting in 67 of them as he came off the bench in 15. Jordan averaged 20.0 ppg, 6.1 rpg, 3.8 assists, and 1.5 spg per game. He also shot 45% from the field, and 82% from the free-throw line. Although Jordan turned 40 during the season, he scored 20 or more points 42 times, 30 or more points nine times, and 40 or more points three times. On February 21, 2003, Jordan became the first 40-year-old to tally 43 points in an NBA game. During his stint with the Wizards, all of Jordan's home games at the MCI Center were sold out and the Wizards were the second most-watched team in the NBA, averaging 20,172 fans a game at home and 19,311 on the road. Jordan's final two seasons did not result in a playoff appearance for the Wizards, and he was often unsatisfied with the play of those around him. At several points, Jordan openly criticized his teammates to the media, citing their lack of focus and intensity, notably that of Kwame Brown, the number-one draft pick in the 2001 NBA draft.

==== Final retirement (2003) ====
With the recognition that 2002–03 would be Jordan's final season, tributes were paid to him throughout the NBA. In his final game at the United Center in Chicago, which was his old home court, Jordan received a four-minute standing ovation. The Miami Heat retired the No. 23 jersey on April 11, 2003, even though Jordan never played for the team. At the 2003 All-Star Game, Jordan was offered a starting spot from Tracy McGrady and Allen Iverson but refused both; he accepted the spot of Vince Carter. Jordan played in his final NBA game on April 16, 2003, in Philadelphia. After scoring 13 points in the game, Jordan went to the bench with 4 minutes and 13 seconds left in the third quarter and his team trailing the Philadelphia 76ers 75–56. Just after the start of the fourth quarter, the First Union Center crowd began chanting "We want Mike!" After much encouragement from coach Doug Collins, Jordan finally rose from the bench and re-entered the game, replacing Larry Hughes with 2:35 remaining. At 1:45, Jordan was intentionally fouled by the 76ers' Eric Snow, and stepped to the line to make both free throws. After the second foul shot, the 76ers in-bounded the ball to rookie John Salmons, who in turn was intentionally fouled by Bobby Simmons one second later, stopping time so that Jordan could return to the bench. He received a three-minute standing ovation from his teammates, his opponents, the officials, and the crowd of 21,257 fans.

== National team career ==
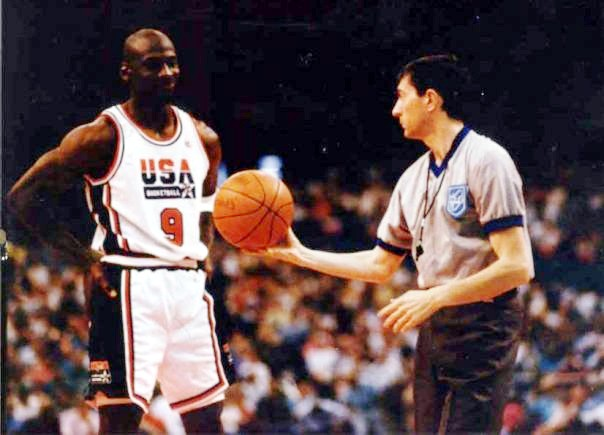
Jordan on the U.S. Olympic team in 1992

Jordan made his debut as a college player for the U.S. national basketball team at the 1983 Pan American Games in Caracas, Venezuela. He led the team in scoring with 17.3 ppg as the U.S., coached by Jack Hartman, won the gold medal. The following year, Jordan won another gold medal in the 1984 Summer Olympics. The 1984 U.S. team was coached by Bob Knight and featured young players such as Patrick Ewing, Sam Perkins, Chris Mullin, Steve Alford, and Wayman Tisdale. Jordan led the team in scoring, averaging 17.1 ppg for the tournament.

In 1992, Jordan, now an NBA player, was a member of the "Dream Team", which included Larry Bird and Magic Johnson. The team won gold in the 1992 Tournament of the Americas, and the 1992 Summer Olympics. Jordan was the only player to start all eight games in the Olympics. He averaged 14.9 ppg on 45% shooting from the field and 68% from the free-throw line, and was second on the team in scoring. He was undefeated in the four tournaments he played for the U.S. national team, and won all 30 games he took part in.

== Player profile ==
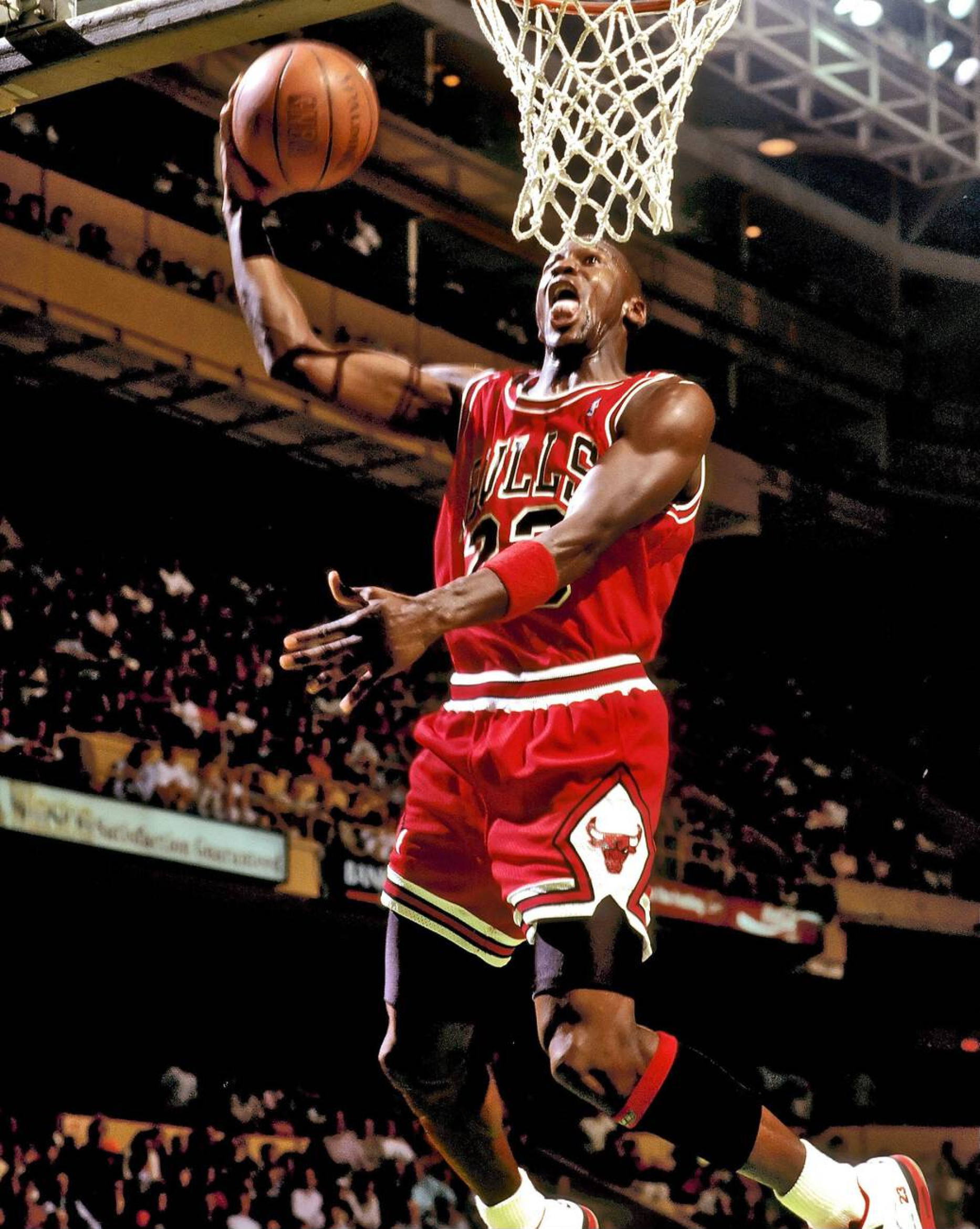
Jordan dunking the ball, 1987–88

Jordan was a shooting guard who could also play as a small forward, the position he would primarily play with the Washington Wizards. Known for an exceptional ability to make high-stakes plays under pressure, and scoring game-winning buzzer beaters, he is regarded by many as the most clutch athlete of all time. With the Bulls, he decided 25 games with field goals or free throws in the last 30 seconds, including two NBA Finals games and five other playoff contests.

Jordan is renowned for his extraordinary sports psychological performance, an attribute deemed his "killer instinct". Sports performance coach Tim Grover wrote that "Michael set the standard for killer instinct and competitive drive". Sportswriter Wright Thompson described him as "a killer, in the Darwinian sense of the word, immediately sensing and attacking someone's weakest spot". As the Bulls organization built the franchise around Jordan, management had to trade away players who were not "tough enough" to compete with him in practice. To improve his defense, Jordan spent hours studying film of opponents. On offense, he relied more on instinct and improvization. Jordan's fierce competitiveness greatly impacted his teammates, sometimes motivating them but also leading to tension and alienation. Jordan's competitiveness was exemplified in his prolific trash talk and work ethic.

Noted as a durable player, Jordan did not miss four or more games while active for a full season from 1986–87 to 2001–02, when he injured his right knee. Of the 15 seasons Jordan was in the NBA, he played all 82 regular season games nine times, and never missed a single playoff game. Jordan has frequently cited David Thompson, Walter Davis, and Jerry West as influences. Confirmed at the start of his career, and possibly later on, Jordan had a special "Love of the Game" clause written into his contract, which was unusual at the time, and allowed him to play basketball against anyone at any time, anywhere.

Jordan had a versatile offensive game and was capable of aggressively driving to the basket as well as drawing fouls from his opponents at a high rate. His 8,772 free throw attempts are the 12th-highest total in NBA history. Early in Jordan's career, he weighed around 200 pounds (91 kg) and was more athletic in terms of play style. As his career progressed, Jordan developed the ability to post up his opponents and score with his trademark fadeaway jump shot, using his leaping ability to avoid block attempts. According to Hubie Brown, this move alone made Jordan nearly unstoppable. Around this time, he bulked up to 215 pounds (98 kg) to adapt to the increased physicality of NBA defenses during the 1990s, sacrificing some athleticism for added strength in the post. Despite media criticism by some as a selfish player early in his career, Jordan was willing to defer to his teammates, with a career average of 5.3 apg and a season-high of 8.0 apg. For a guard, Jordan was also a good rebounder, finishing with 6.2 rpg. Defensively, he averaged 2.3 spg and 0.8 bpg.

The three-point field goal was not Jordan's strength, especially in his early years. Later on in his career, Jordan improved his three-point shooting, and finished his career with a three-point field goal percentage of 32.7%. His best years shooting from three were the 1989–90 and 1992–93 seasons, where he shot 37.6% and 35.2% from three, respectively. (Note: Jordan did shoot higher percentages from 1995 to 1997, but in those years, the three-point line was temporarily moved inwards.)

Overall, Jordan's effective field goal percentage was 51%, and he had six seasons with at least 50% shooting, five of which were consecutive (1988–1992). Jordan also shot 51% and 50% from the field, and 30% and 33% from three-point range, throughout his first and second retirements, respectively, finishing his Bulls career with 31.5 points per game on 50.5 FG% shooting and his overall career with 49.7 FG% shooting.

In 1988, Jordan was honored with the NBA Defensive Player of the Year and Most Valuable Player awards. No NBA player had previously won both awards in their career. He also set both seasonal and career records for blocked shots by a guard, and combined this with his ball-thieving ability to become a standout defensive player. Jordan ranks fourth in NBA history in total steals with 2,514, trailing John Stockton, Jason Kidd and Chris Paul. Jerry West often stated that he was more impressed with Jordan's defensive contributions than his offensive ones. Doc Rivers declared Jordan "the best superstar defender in the history of the game".

Jordan was known to have strong eyesight. Broadcaster Al Michaels said that Jordan was able to read baseball box scores on a 27-inch (69 cm) television clearly from about 50 feet (15 m) away. During the 2001 NBA Finals, Phil Jackson compared Jordan's dominance to Shaquille O'Neal, stating: "Michael would get fouled on every play and still have to play through it and just clear himself for shots instead and would rise to that occasion."

== Legacy ==
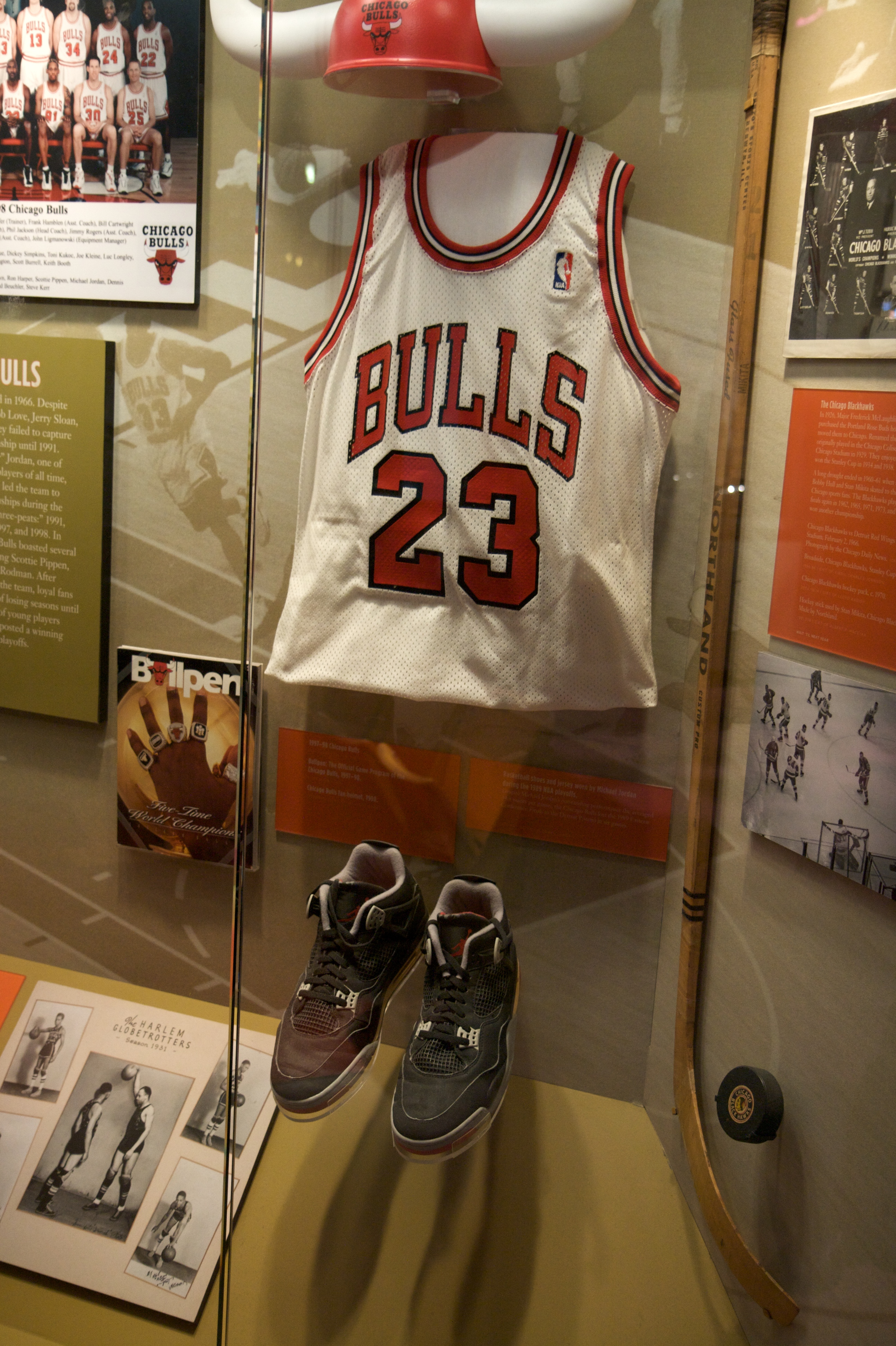
Jordan's memorabilia on display at the Chicago History Museum

Jordan is regarded as one of the most influential sports figures in history and is considered by many to be the greatest basketball player of all time; he was integral in popularizing basketball and the NBA around the world in the 1980s and 1990s. (Note: Sources, studies, or lists that share such an opinion include: Andrews, Carrington, Jackson, and Mazur (1996); Stein and Hajari (1999); Markovits and Rensmann (2010); Sports Illustrated (2016); Vogan (2018); The Players' Tribune (2020); CBS Sports (2020); The Athletic (2022); ESPN (2022); The Sporting News (2024); Nine Publishing panel of sports writers (2025); Bleacher Report (2025); ClutchPoints (2025); Complex (2026))

Jordan's talent was evident starting in his first NBA season, when he was compared to Julius Erving. Larry Bird said that rookie Jordan was the best player he ever saw, that Jordan was "one of a kind", and that he was comparable to Wayne Gretzky as an athlete. In his first game in Madison Square Garden against the New York Knicks, Jordan received a near minute-long standing ovation. After Jordan established the single game playoff record of 63 points against the Boston Celtics on April 20, 1986, Bird described him as "God disguised as Michael Jordan".

Jordan led the NBA in scoring during a record 10 seasons and tied Wilt Chamberlain's record of seven consecutive scoring titles. Jordan was a fixture of the NBA All-Defensive First Team, making the roster nine times—a record shared with Gary Payton, Kevin Garnett, and Kobe Bryant. He also holds the records for career regular season scoring average (30.1 points per game) and career playoff scoring average (33.4 points per game). Jordan was the outright leading scorer across both teams in 36 of the 37 playoff series of his career (97.3%). (Note: The only exception was his first-ever playoff series, when Terry Cummings of the Milwaukee Bucks outscored him 118–117 in the first round of the 1985 NBA playoffs.) By 1998, the season of his Finals-winning shot against the Jazz, he was well known throughout the league as a clutch performer. In the regular season, Jordan was the Bulls' primary threat in the final seconds of a close game and in the playoffs; he would always ask for the ball at crunch time. Jordan's total of 5,987 points in the playoffs is the second-highest among NBA career playoff scoring leaders. He scored 32,292 points in the regular season, placing him sixth on the NBA all-time scoring list behind LeBron James, Kareem Abdul-Jabbar, Karl Malone, Bryant, and Kevin Durant.

With five regular season MVPs (tied for second place with Bill Russell—only Abdul-Jabbar has won more, with six), six Finals MVPs (NBA record), and three NBA All-Star Game MVPs, Jordan is among the most decorated players in NBA history. The six Finals MVP awards NBA record is also the record for most championship MVP awards of an athlete across any major U.S. professional sport. He finished among the top three in regular season MVP voting 10 times. Jordan was named one of the 50 Greatest Players in NBA History in 1996, and selected to the NBA 75th Anniversary Team in 2021. He is one of only eight players in history to achieve the basketball Triple Crown—winning an NCAA championship, an NBA championship, and an Olympic gold medal. In the All-Star Game fan ballot, Jordan received the most votes nine times.

"There's Michael Jordan and then there is the rest of us."

— Magic Johnson

Harry Edwards, considered the father of the field of sociology of sport, referred to Jordan as representing the highest level of human achievement comparable to Gandhi, Einstein, or Michelangelo. Pulitzer-winning writer David Halberstam stated that if he were in charge of introducing an alien being "to the epitome of human potential, creativity, perseverance and spirit" he would introduce that alien life to Michael Jordan. Many of Jordan's contemporaries have said that he is the greatest basketball player of all time. In 1999, an ESPN survey of journalists, athletes and other sports figures ranked Jordan the greatest North American athlete of the 20th century. Jordan placed second to Babe Ruth in the Associated Press' December 1999 list of 20th century athletes. The Associated Press also voted Jordan the greatest basketball player of the 20th century. He has also appeared on the front cover of Sports Illustrated a record 50 times. In the September 1996 issue of Sport, which was the publication's 50th-anniversary issue, Jordan was named the greatest athlete of the past 50 years.

Jordan's athletic leaping ability, highlighted in his back-to-back Slam Dunk Contest championships in 1987 and 1988, is credited by many people with having influenced a generation of young players. Several NBA players, including James and Dwyane Wade, have stated that they considered Jordan as their role model while they were growing up. Commentators have also dubbed a number of players "the next Michael Jordan" upon their entry to the NBA, including Penny Hardaway, Grant Hill, Allen Iverson, Bryant, Vince Carter, James, and Wade. Jordan's jersey number, 23, also became iconic; numerous subsequent NBA players have worn it to pay tribute to him, including James, Metta Sandiford-Artest, and Anthony Davis.

Although Jordan was a well-rounded player, his "Air Jordan" image is also often credited with inadvertently decreasing the jump shooting skills, defense, and fundamentals of young players, a fact Jordan himself has lamented, saying: "I think it was the exposure of Michael Jordan; the marketing of Michael Jordan. Everything was marketed towards the things that people wanted to see, which was scoring and dunking. That Michael Jordan still played defense and an all-around game, but it was never really publicized." During his heyday, Jordan did much to increase the status of the game; television ratings increased only during his time in the league. The popularity of the NBA in the U.S. declined after his last title. As late as 2026, NBA Finals television ratings had not returned to the level reached during his last championship-winning season.

Jordan at the NBA 75th Anniversary Team celebration during the halftime ceremony of the 2022 All-Star Game

In August 2009, the Naismith Basketball Hall of Fame opened a Michael Jordan exhibit. When Jordan was accepted into the Hall of Fame, he selected Class of 1996 member David Thompson to present him. As Jordan would explain during his induction speech in September 2009, he was not a fan of the Tar Heels when growing up in North Carolina but greatly admired Thompson, who played for the rival NC State Wolfpack. Several former Bulls teammates were in attendance at the induction, including Scottie Pippen, Dennis Rodman, Charles Oakley, Ron Harper, Steve Kerr, and Toni Kukoč, as were former coaches Dean Smith and Doug Collins. His emotional reaction during his speech when Jordan began to cry was captured by Associated Press photographer Stephan Savoia and would later go viral on social media as the "Crying Jordan" meme. In 2016, President Barack Obama honored Jordan with the Presidential Medal of Freedom. In December 2022, the NBA unveiled a new regular season MVP trophy, named in Jordan's honor, to be awarded beginning with the 2022–23 season, which replaced the original trophy, named in honor of former NBA commissioner Maurice Podoloff. In October 2026, Jordan's jersey in which he played Game 2 of the 1998 NBA Finals was sold for $14 million, making it the second most expensive piece of sports memorabilia in history; additionally, the jersey from Game 1 of the same series was sold at auction for $10.09 million in 2022 and the jersey from Game 3 was auctioned in 2026 for $12.26 million.

== Career statistics ==
Legend
GP	Games played	GS	Games started	MPG	Minutes per game
FG%	Field goal percentage	3P%	3-point field goal percentage	FT%	Free throw percentage
RPG	Rebounds per game	APG	Assists per game	SPG	Steals per game
BPG	Blocks per game	PPG	Points per game	**Bold**	Career high
†	Won an NBA championship	*	Led the league	‡	NBA record

=== NBA ===
==== Regular season ====
NBA regular season statistics
Year	Team	GP	GS	MPG	FG%	3P%	FT%	RPG	APG	SPG	BPG	PPG
1984–85	Chicago	**82***	**82***	38.3	.515	.173	.845	6.5	5.9	2.4	.8	28.2
1985–86	Chicago	18	7	25.1	.457	.167	.840	3.6	2.9	2.1	1.2	22.7
1986–87	Chicago	**82***	**82***	40.0	.482	.182	**.857**	5.2	4.6	2.9	1.5	**37.1***
1987–88	Chicago	**82**	**82***	**40.4***	.535	.132	.841	5.5	5.9	**3.2***	**1.6**	35.0*
1988–89	Chicago	81	81	40.2*	.538	.276	.850	**8.0**	**8.0**	2.9	.8	32.5*
1989–90	Chicago	**82***	**82***	39.0	.526	.376	.848	6.9	6.3	2.8*	.7	33.6*
1990–91†	Chicago	**82***	**82***	37.0	**.539**	.312	.851	6.0	5.5	2.7	1.0	31.5*
1991–92†	Chicago	80	80	38.8	.519	.270	.832	6.4	6.1	2.3	.9	30.1*
1992–93†	Chicago	78	78	39.3	.495	.352	.837	6.7	5.5	2.8*	.8	32.6*
1994–95	Chicago	17	17	39.3	.411	**.500**	.801	6.9	5.3	1.8	.8	26.9
1995–96†	Chicago	**82**	**82***	37.7	.495	.427	.834	6.6	4.3	2.2	.5	30.4*
1996–97†	Chicago	**82**	**82***	37.9	.486	.374	.833	5.9	4.3	1.7	.5	29.6*
1997–98†	Chicago	**82***	**82***	38.8	.465	.238	.784	5.8	3.5	1.7	.5	28.7*
2001–02	Washington	60	53	34.9	.416	.189	.790	5.7	5.2	1.4	.4	22.9
2002–03	Washington	**82**	67	37.0	.445	.291	.821	6.1	3.8	1.5	.5	20.0
Career		1,072	1,039	38.3	.497	.327	.835	6.2	5.3	2.3	.8	30.1‡
All-Star		13	13	29.4	.472	.273	.750	4.7	4.2	2.8	.5	20.2

==== Playoffs ====
NBA playoff statistics
Year	Team	GP	GS	MPG	FG%	3P%	FT%	RPG	APG	SPG	BPG	PPG
1985	Chicago	4	4	42.8*	.436	.125	.828	5.8	**8.5**	**2.8***	1.0	29.3
1986	Chicago	3	3	**45.0**	.505	**1.000**	.872	6.3	5.7	2.3	1.3	**43.7**‡
1987	Chicago	3	3	42.7	.417	.400	**.897**	7.0	6.0	2.0	**2.3**	35.7*
1988	Chicago	10	10	42.7	**.531**	.333	.869	7.1	4.7	2.4	1.1	36.3
1989	Chicago	17*	17*	42.2	.510	.286	.799	7.0	7.6	2.5	.8	34.8*
1990	Chicago	16	16	42.1	.514	.320	.836	7.2	6.8	**2.8***	.9	36.7*
1991†	Chicago	17	17	40.5	.524	.385	.845	6.4	8.4	2.4	1.4	31.1*
1992†	Chicago	**22***	**22***	41.8	.499	.386	.857	6.2	5.8	2.0	.7	34.5*
1993†	Chicago	19	19	41.2	.475	.389	.805	6.7	6.0	2.1	.9	35.1*
1995	Chicago	10	10	42.0	.484	.367	.810	6.5	4.5	2.3	1.4	31.5
1996†	Chicago	18	18	40.7	.459	.403	.818	4.9	4.1	1.8	.3	30.7*
1997†	Chicago	19	19	42.3	.456	.194	.831	**7.9**	4.8	1.6	.9	31.1*
1998†	Chicago	21*	21*	41.5	.462	.302	.812	5.1	3.5	1.5	.6	32.4*
Career		179	179	41.8	.487	.332	.828	6.4	5.7	2.1	.8	33.4‡

=== College ===
College statistics
Year	Team	GP	GS	MPG	FG%	3P%	FT%	RPG	APG	SPG	BPG	PPG
1981–82	North Carolina	34	32	**31.7**	.534	–	.722	4.4	1.8	1.2	.2	13.5
1982–83	North Carolina	**36**	**36**	30.9	.535	**.447**	.737	**5.5**	1.6	**2.2**	.8	**20.0**
1983–84	North Carolina	31	30	29.5	**.551**	–	**.779**	5.3	**2.1**	1.6	**1.1**	19.6
Career		101	98	30.8	.540	.447	.748	5.0	1.8	1.7	.7	17.7

== Awards and honors ==
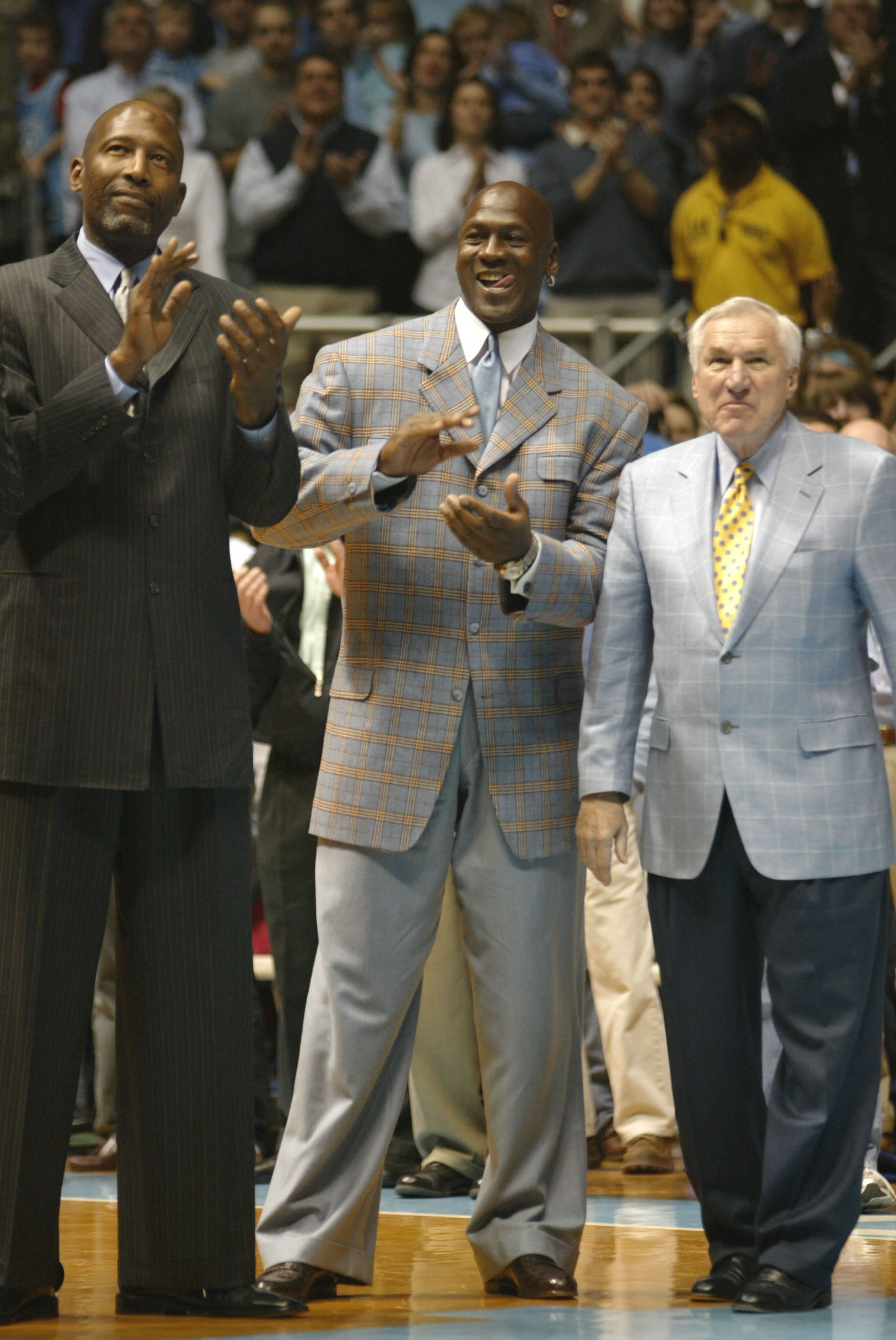
James Worthy, Jordan, and Dean Smith in 2007 at a North Carolina Tar Heels men's basketball game honoring the 1957 and 1982 men's basketball teams

NBA

- Six-time NBA champion – 1991, 1992, 1993, 1996, 1997, 1998
- Six-time NBA Finals MVP – 1991, 1992, 1993, 1996, 1997, 1998
- Five-time NBA MVP – 1988, 1991, 1992, 1996, 1998
- NBA Defensive Player of the Year – 1988
- NBA Rookie of the Year – 1985
- NBA All-Rookie First Team – 1985
- 14-time NBA All-Star – 1985–1993, 1996–1998, 2002, 2003
- Three-time NBA All-Star Game MVP – 1988, 1996, 1998
- 10-time All-NBA First Team – 1987–1993, 1996–1998
- All-NBA Second Team – 1985
- Nine-time NBA All-Defensive First Team – 1988–1993, 1996–1998
- Two-time NBA Slam Dunk Contest champion – 1987, 1988
- Two-time IBM Award winner – 1985, 1989
- 10-time NBA scoring leader – 1987–1993, 1996–1998
- Three-time NBA steals leader – 1988, 1990, 1993
- NBA free throw scoring leader – 1987
- Two-time NBA minutes played leader – 1988, 1989
- Named one of the 50 Greatest Players in NBA History in 1996
- Selected on the NBA 75th Anniversary Team in 2021
- No. 23 retired by the Chicago Bulls
- No. 23 retired by the Miami Heat
- Chicago Bulls Ring of Honor
- NBA MVP trophy renamed in Jordan's honor ("Michael Jordan Trophy") in 2022

USA Basketball

- Two-time Olympic gold medal winner – 1984, 1992
- Tournament of the Americas gold medal winner – 1992
- Pan American Games gold medal winner – 1983
- Three-time USA Basketball Male Athlete of the Year – 1983, 1984, 1992

NCAA

- NCAA national championship – 1982
- Two-time Sporting News National Player of the Year – 1983, 1984
- AP College Player of the Year – 1984
- USBWA College Player of the Year – 1984
- Naismith College Player of the Year – 1984
- Adolph Rupp Trophy – 1984
- John R. Wooden Award – 1984
- UPI College Player of the Year – 1984
- NABC Player of the Year – 1984
- Two-time Consensus NCAA All-American First Team – 1983, 1984
- ACC Athlete of the Year – 1984
- ACC Men's Basketball Player of the Year – 1984
- ACC Rookie of the Year – 1982
- Two-time First-team All-ACC – 1983, 1984
- Selected on the ACC 50th Anniversary Team in 2002
- No. 23 retired by the North Carolina Tar Heels

High school

- McDonald's All-American – 1981
- Parade All-America Boys Basketball Team – 1981
- Named one of the Greatest Boys McDonald's All-Americans in 2012

Halls of Fame

- Two-time Naismith Memorial Basketball Hall of Fame inductee:
  - Class of 2009 – individual
  - Class of 2010 – as a member of the "Dream Team"
- United States Olympic Hall of Fame – Class of 2009 (as a member of the "Dream Team")
- North Carolina Sports Hall of Fame – Class of 2010
- Two-time FIBA Hall of Fame inductee:
  - Class of 2015 – individual
  - Class of 2017 – as a member of the "Dream Team"

NASCAR (as team owner of 23XI Racing)

- NASCAR Cup Series regular season champion – 2024
- Two-time Brickyard 400 champion – 2025, 2026
- Daytona 500 champion – 2026

Other/media

- McDonald's Championship – 1997
- McDonald's Championship MVP – 1997
- McDonald's Championship top scorer – 1997
- Three-time Associated Press Athlete of the Year – 1991, 1992, 1993
- Sports Illustrated Sportsperson of the Year – 1991
- Sporting News Athlete of the Year – 1991
- Seven-time Sporting News NBA MVP – 1988, 1989, 1991, 1992, 1996, 1997, 1998
- Ranked No. 1 by Slam magazine's "Top 50 Players of All-Time"
- Ranked No. 1 by ESPN SportsCentury's "Top North American Athletes of the 20th Century"
- 10-time ESPY Award winner (in various categories)
- 1997 Marca Leyenda winner

National

- Presidential Medal of Freedom – 2016

State/local

- Statue inside the United Center
- Section of Madison Street in Chicago renamed Michael Jordan Drive – 1994

== Post-retirement ==
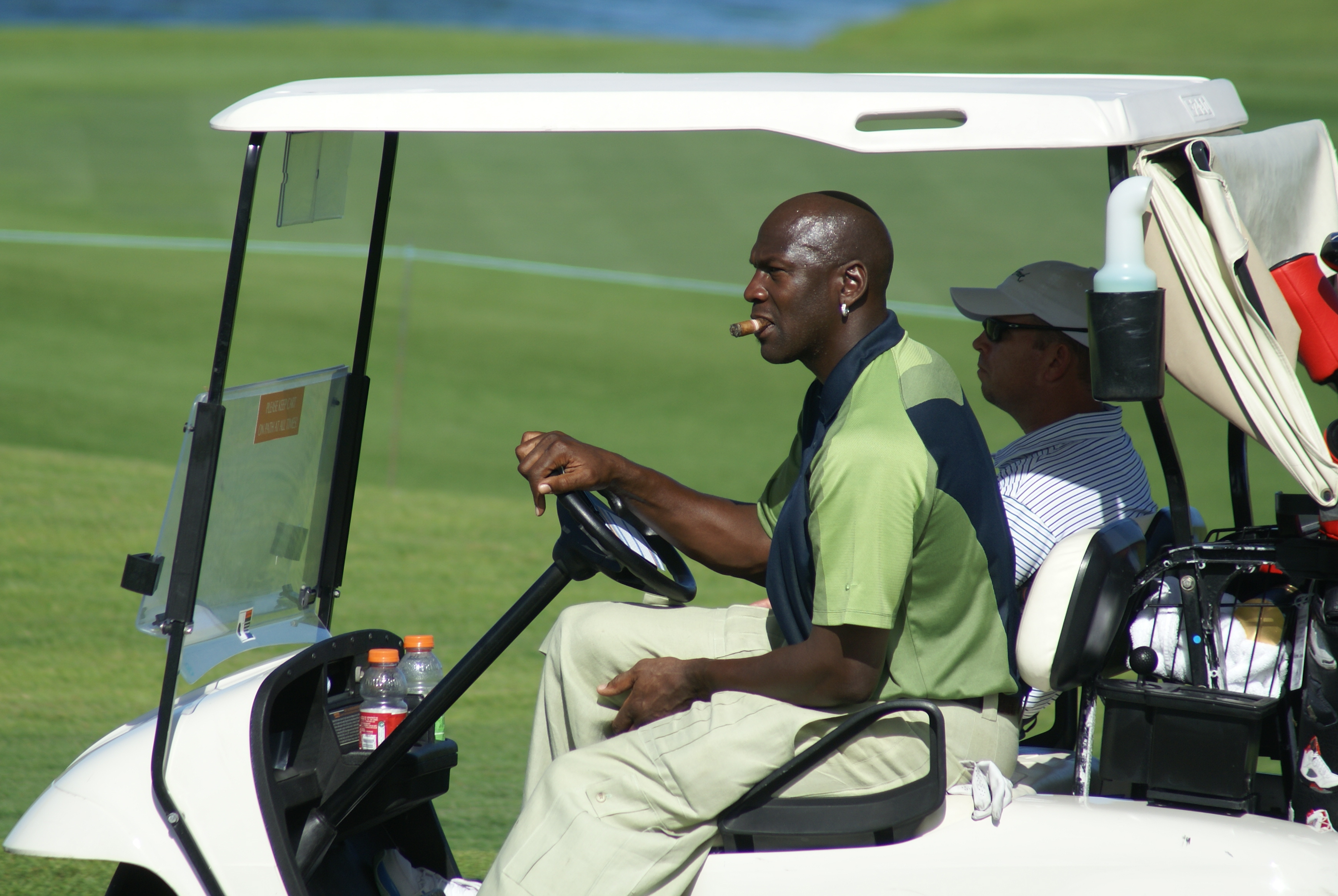
Jordan on a golf course in 2007

After his third retirement, Jordan assumed that he would be able to return to his position as Director of Basketball Operations with the Wizards. Jordan's previous tenure had produced mixed results and may have also influenced the trade of Richard Hamilton for Jerry Stackhouse, although Jordan was not technically Director of Basketball Operations in 2002. On May 7, 2003, Wizards owner Abe Pollin fired Jordan from the role. Jordan later stated that he felt betrayed, and that if he had known he would be fired upon retiring, he never would have come back to play for the Wizards.

Over the next few years, Jordan played golf in celebrity charity tournaments and spent time with his family in Chicago. He also promoted his Jordan Brand clothing line and rode motorcycles. Since 2004, Jordan has owned Michael Jordan Motorsports, a professional closed-course motorcycle road racing team that competed with two Suzukis in the premier Superbike championship sanctioned by the American Motorcyclist Association (AMA) until the end of the 2013 season.

=== Charlotte Bobcats / Hornets ===
On June 15, 2006, Jordan bought a minority stake in the Charlotte Bobcats (known as the Hornets since 2013), becoming the team's second-largest shareholder behind majority owner Robert L. Johnson. As part of the deal, Jordan took full control over the basketball side of the operation, with the title Managing Member of Basketball Operations. Despite his previous success as an endorser, Jordan made an effort not to be included in Charlotte's marketing campaigns. A decade earlier, he had made a bid to become part-owner of Charlotte's original NBA team, the Charlotte Hornets (now the New Orleans Pelicans), but talks collapsed when owner George Shinn refused to give Jordan complete control of basketball operations.

In February 2010, it was reported that Jordan was seeking majority ownership of the Bobcats. Jordan and former Houston Rockets president George Postolos were the leading contenders for ownership of the team. On February 27, the Bobcats announced that Johnson had reached an agreement with Jordan and his group, MJ Basketball Holdings, to buy the team from Johnson pending NBA approval. On March 17, the NBA Board of Governors unanimously approved Jordan's purchase, making him the first former player to become the majority owner of an NBA team, and the league's only African-American majority owner.

During the 2011 NBA lockout, The New York Times wrote that Jordan led a group of 10 to 14 hardline owners who wanted to cap the players' share of basketball-related income at 50 percent and as low as 47. Journalists observed that, during the labor dispute in 1998, Jordan told Washington Wizards then-owner Abe Pollin: "If you can't make a profit, you should sell your team." Jason Whitlock of FoxSports.com called Jordan "a hypocrite sellout who can easily betray the very people who made him a billionaire global icon" for wanting "current players to pay for his incompetence". He cited Jordan's executive decisions to draft disappointing players Kwame Brown and Adam Morrison.

During the 2011–12 NBA season that was shortened to 66 games by the lockout, the Bobcats posted a 7–59 record. The team closed out the season with a 23-game losing streak; their .106 winning percentage was the worst in NBA history. Before the next season, Jordan said: "I'm not real happy about the record book scenario last year. It's very, very frustrating."

During the 2019 NBA offseason, Jordan sold a minority piece of the Hornets to Gabe Plotkin and Daniel Sundheim, retaining the majority for himself, as well as the role of chairman. In 2023, Jordan finalized the sale of his majority stake to Plotkin and Rick Schnall, ending his 13-year tenure as majority owner, although he kept a minority stake and still served as an alternate governor. The sale was officially completed in August 2023 for approximately $3 billion, more than 10 times the $275 million Jordan had paid for the team.

=== 23XI Racing ===
Jordan at Pocono Raceway in 2021

On September 21, 2020, Jordan and NASCAR driver Denny Hamlin announced they would be fielding a NASCAR Cup Series team with Bubba Wallace driving, beginning competition in the 2021 season. On October 22, the team's name was confirmed to be 23XI Racing (pronounced twenty-three eleven) and the team's entry would bear No. 23.

After the team's inaugural season, it added a second car with No. 45, driven by Kurt Busch in 2022. After Busch got severely hurt and Wallace got penalized, Ty Gibbs, John Hunter Nemechek, and Daniel Hemric served for the team as substitutes. For 2023, Busch was replaced by Tyler Reddick. Reddick won the 2024 NASCAR Cup Series regular season championship, the first for the team.

23XI Racing acquired a third charter from the defunct Stewart–Haas Racing, the No. 35 driven by Riley Herbst beginning in 2025.

Front Row Motorsports and Jordan, Hamlin, and his team sued NASCAR in October 2024 over the new charter agreements; the case was later settled on December 11, 2025, after 8 days in court. Reddick became the first driver in Cup Series history to win the first three races in a season, including the 2026 Daytona 500, making Jordan a Daytona 500 champion.

The team has also fielded a part-time entry under car numbers 50 and 67, driven by Corey Heim, Kamui Kobayashi, Juan Pablo Montoya, and Travis Pastrana.

== Personal life ==
=== Relationships ===
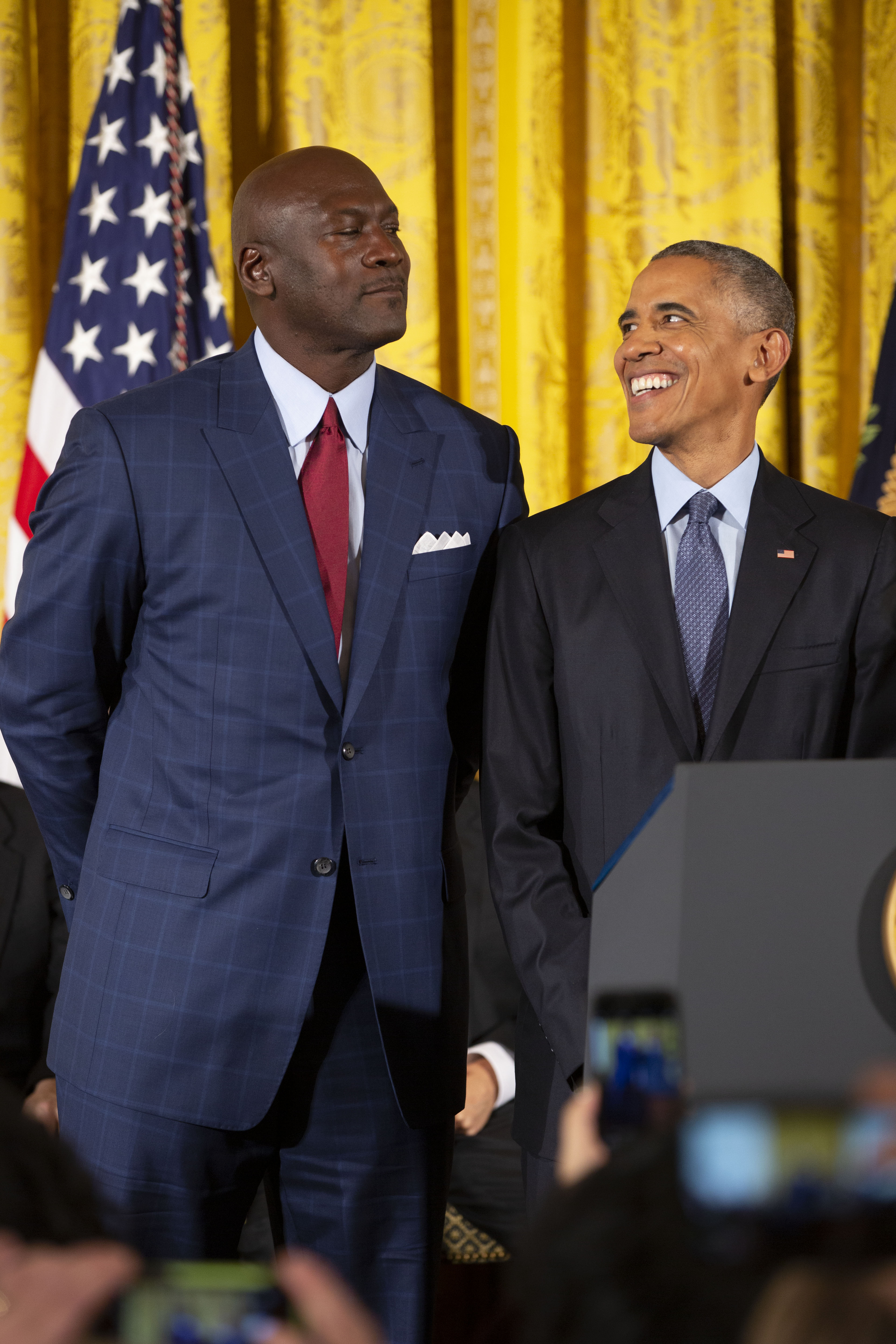
Jordan (left) receiving the Presidential Medal of Freedom from President Barack Obama at the White House

Jordan married Juanita Vanoy at A Little White Wedding Chapel in Las Vegas on September 2, 1989. They had three children, including Jeffrey and Marcus. The Jordans filed for divorce on January 4, 2002, citing irreconcilable differences, but reconciled shortly thereafter. They again filed for divorce and were granted a dissolution of marriage on December 29, 2006, commenting that the decision was made "mutually and amicably". It is reported that Juanita received a $168 million settlement (equivalent to $268 million in 2025), the largest celebrity divorce settlement on public record at the time.

In 1991, Jordan purchased a lot in Highland Park, Illinois, where he planned to build a 56,000-square-foot (5,200 m^{2}) mansion. It was completed in 1995. Jordan listed the mansion for sale in 2012. He also owns homes in North Carolina and Jupiter Island, Florida.

On July 21, 2006, a judge in Cook County, Illinois, determined that Jordan did not owe his alleged former lover Karla Knafel $5 million in a breach of contract claim. Jordan had allegedly paid Knafel $250,000 to keep their relationship secret. Knafel claimed Jordan promised her $5 million for remaining silent and agreeing not to file a paternity suit after Knafel learned she was pregnant in 1991; a DNA test showed that Jordan was not the father of the child.

Jordan proposed to his longtime girlfriend, Cuban-American model Yvette Prieto, on Christmas 2011, and they were married on April 27, 2013, at Bethesda-by-the-Sea Episcopal Church. It was announced on November 30, 2013, that the two were expecting their first child together. On February 11, 2014, Prieto gave birth to identical twin daughters. In 2019, Jordan became a grandfather.

=== Gambling ===
During the 1993 NBA playoffs, Jordan was seen gambling in Atlantic City. The previous year, he admitted that he had to cover $57,000 in gambling losses, and author Richard Esquinas wrote a book in 1993 claiming he had won $1.25 million from Jordan on the golf course.

In 2005, Jordan discussed his gambling with Ed Bradley of 60 Minutes:

Yeah, I've gotten myself into situations where I would not walk away and I've pushed the envelope. Is that compulsive? Yeah, it depends on how you look at it. If you're willing to jeopardize your livelihood and your family, then yeah.

David Stern, the commissioner of the NBA, denied in 1995 and 2006 that Jordan's 1993 retirement was a secret suspension by the league for gambling, but the rumor spread widely. In 2010, Ron Shelton, director of Jordan Rides the Bus, said that he began working on the documentary believing that the NBA had suspended him, but that research "convinced [him it] was nonsense".

=== Politics ===
In 1990, Jordan declined to endorse Democratic candidate Harvey Gantt, reportedly remarking, "Republicans buy sneakers, too." In The Last Dance, Jordan confirmed he made the comment on a team bus but clarified it was intended as a joke, adding that he did not view himself as a political activist. In 2000, Jordan endorsed the presidential campaign of Democrat Bill Bradley, the first time that he publicly supported a candidate.

== Media figure and business interests ==
=== Endorsements ===
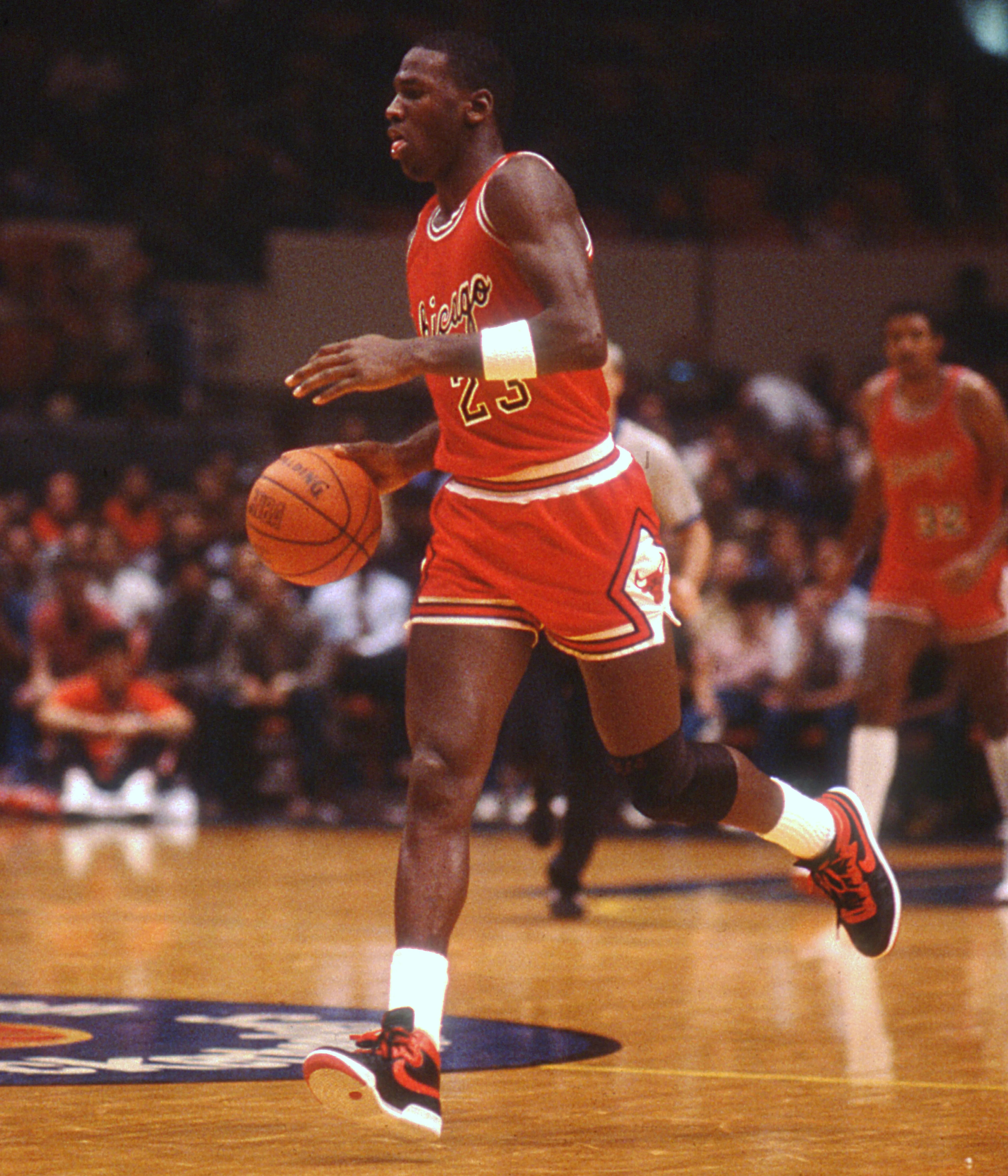
Jordan wearing Nike Air Ship shoes in a preseason game on October 18, 1984.

Jordan is one of the most marketed sports figures ever. He has been a major spokesman for such brands as Nike, Coca-Cola, Chevrolet, Gatorade, McDonald's, Ball Park Franks, Rayovac, Wheaties, Hanes, MCI, 2K, and Upper Deck. Early in his career, Jordan appeared in an anti-drug advertisement sponsored by McDonald's. Jordan has appeared in over 20 commercials for Gatorade since 1991, including the "Be Like Mike" commercials in which a song was sung by children wishing to be like Jordan. Nike created a signature shoe for Jordan, called the Air Jordan, in 1984. One of his more popular commercials for the shoe involved Spike Lee playing the part of Mars Blackmon: Lee, as Blackmon, attempted to find the source of Jordan's abilities and became convinced that "it's gotta be the shoes". The hype and demand for the shoes brought on a spate of "shoe-jackings", in which people were robbed of their sneakers at gunpoint. Subsequently, Nike spun off the Jordan line into its own division named the "Jordan Brand", with athletes and celebrities as endorsers. The brand has also sponsored college sports programs such as those of North Carolina, UCLA, California, Oklahoma, Florida, Georgetown, and Marquette.

Jordan also has been associated with the Looney Tunes cartoons. A Nike commercial shown during 1992's Super Bowl XXVI featured Jordan and Bugs Bunny playing basketball. This commercial inspired the 1996 live-action animated film Space Jam, which starred Jordan and Bugs in a story set during the former's first retirement from basketball. They have subsequently appeared together in several commercials for MCI. Jordan also made an appearance in the music video for Michael Jackson's "Jam" (1992).

In 2008, Jordan's yearly income from endorsements was estimated at over $40 million. When his power at the ticket gates was at its highest point, the Bulls regularly sold out both their home and road games. Due to this, Jordan set records in player salary by signing annual contracts worth in excess of $30 million per season. An academic study found that his first NBA comeback resulted in an increase in the market capitalization of his client firms of more than $1 billion.

Most of Jordan's endorsement deals, including his first deal with Nike, were engineered by his then-agent, David Falk. Jordan has described Falk as "the best at what he does" and that "marketing-wise, he's great. He's the one who came up with the concept of 'Air Jordan'."

=== Business ventures and wealth ===
In June 2010, Jordan was ranked by Forbes as the 20th-most-powerful celebrity in the world, with $55 million earned between June 2009 and June 2010. According to Forbes, Jordan Brand generates $1 billion in sales for Nike. In June 2014, Jordan was named the first NBA player to become a billionaire, after he increased his stake in the Charlotte Hornets from 80% to 89.5%. Jordan was honored with the Charlotte Business Journal's Business Person of the Year for 2014. In 2017, he became a part owner of the Miami Marlins of Major League Baseball.

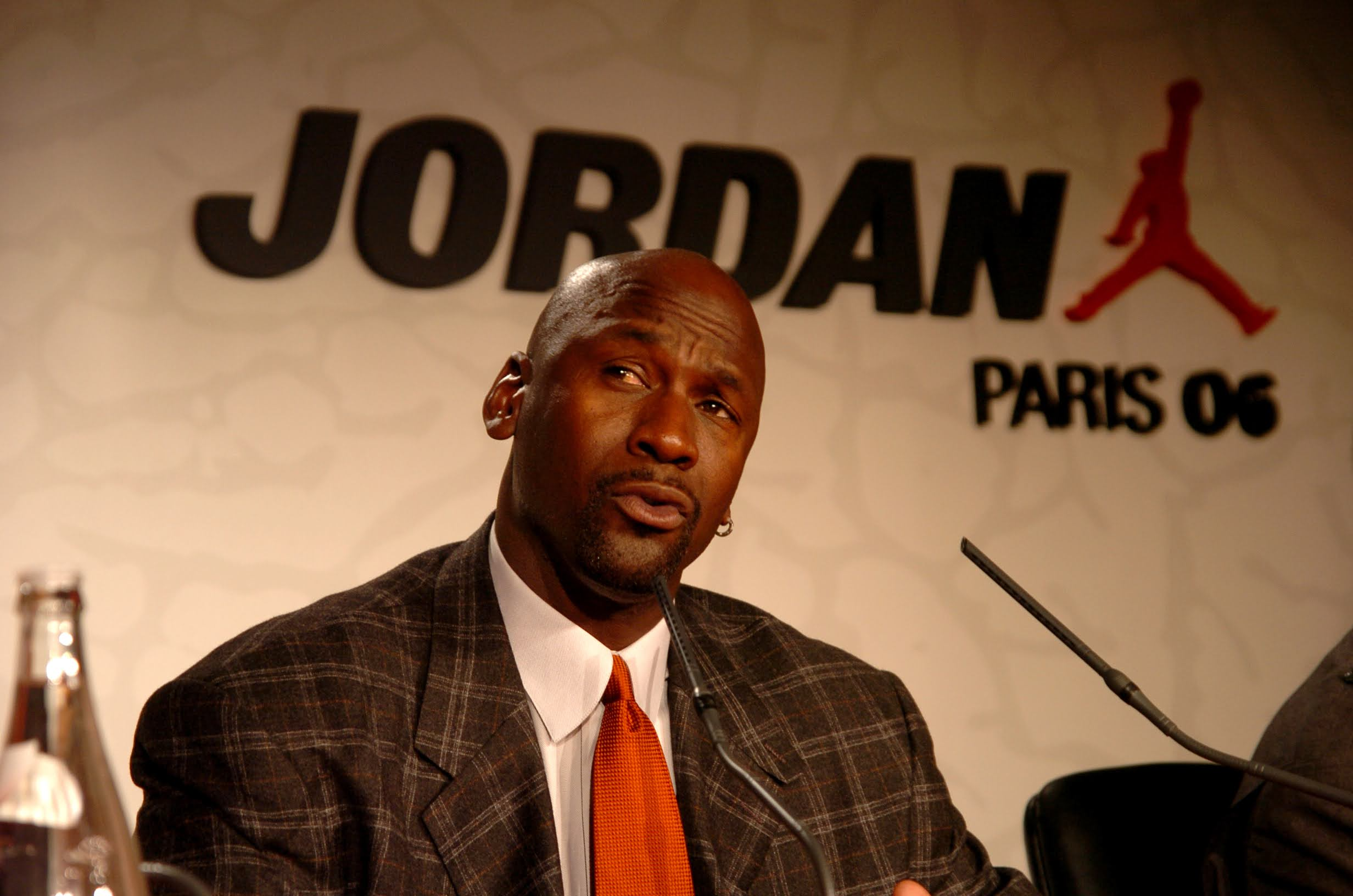
Jordan during an Air Jordan event in Paris in October 2006

Forbes designated Jordan as the athlete with the highest career earnings in 2017. From his Jordan Brand income and endorsements, Jordan's 2015 income was an estimated $110 million, the most of any retired athlete. As of 2026, his net worth is estimated at $4.7 billion by Forbes, making him the fourth-richest African-American, and one of the richest celebrities. In April 2026, Sportico ranked Jordan as the highest-paid athlete in history (as of December 31, 2025); his earnings were estimated at $4.5 billion when adjusted for inflation. He is the wealthiest athlete of all time with official records. (Note: This is excluding Gaius Appuleius Diocles (104 – c. 146), an ancient Roman charioteer who had a net worth of approximately $15 billion.)

Jordan co-owns an automotive group which bears his name. The company has a Nissan dealership in Durham, North Carolina, acquired in 1990, and formerly had a Lincoln–Mercury dealership from 1995 until its closure in 2009. The company also owned a Nissan franchise in Glen Burnie, Maryland. The restaurant industry is another business interest of Jordan's. Restaurants he has owned include the former Michael Jordan's Restaurant in Chicago, and steakhouse in New York City's Grand Central Terminal; the latter restaurant closed in 2018. Other locations of the steakhouse are still operating in Chicago, Connecticut, and South Korea. He is also the owner of 1000 North, an upscale waterfront restaurant and private social club in Jupiter and Sarasota, Florida. Jordan is the majority investor in a golf course, Grove XXIII in Hobe Sound, Florida.

In September 2020, Jordan became an investor and advisor for DraftKings. Since September 2021, he occupies the same role at Sportradar.

=== Philanthropy ===
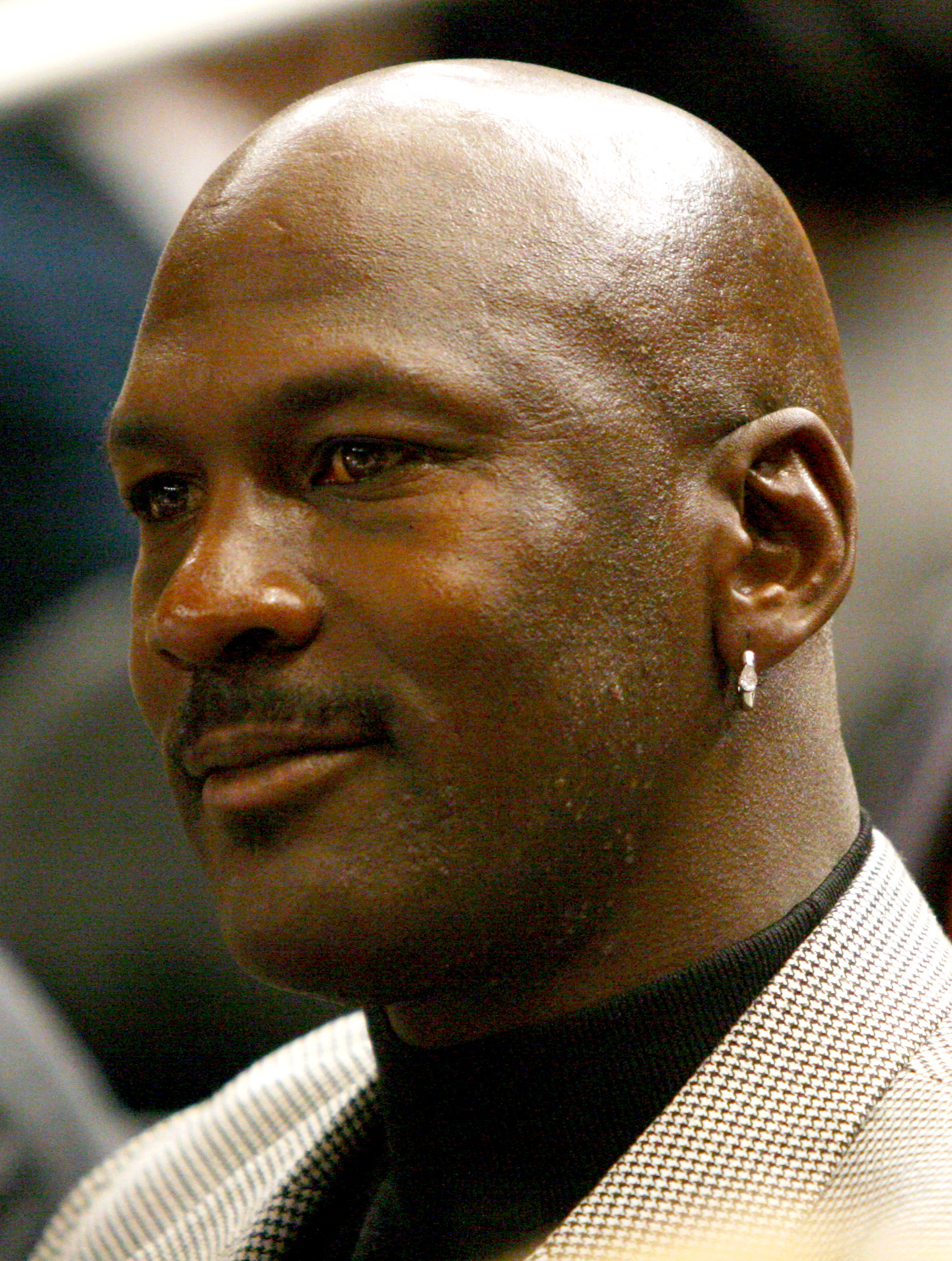
Jordan in 2006

From 2001 to 2014, Jordan hosted an annual golf tournament, the Michael Jordan Celebrity Invitational, that raised money for various charities. In 2006, Jordan and his wife Juanita pledged $5 million to Chicago's Hales Franciscan High School. The Jordan Brand has made donations to Habitat for Humanity and a Louisiana branch of the Boys & Girls Clubs of America. Jordan is also a founding donor of the National Museum of African American History and Culture in Washington, D.C.

The Make-A-Wish Foundation named Jordan its Chief Wish Ambassador in 2008. In 2013, he granted his 200th wish. As of 2019, Jordan has raised more than $5 million for the Make-A-Wish Foundation. In 2023, he donated $10 million to the organization for his 60th birthday.

In 2015, Jordan donated a settlement of undisclosed size from a lawsuit against supermarkets that had used his name without permission to 23 different Chicago charities. In 2017, Jordan gave $7 million to fund two Novant Health Michael Jordan Family Clinics in Charlotte, North Carolina, his biggest donation to that point. The following year, after Hurricane Florence damaged parts of North Carolina, Jordan donated $2 million to relief efforts. He gave $1 million to aid the Bahamas' recovery following Hurricane Dorian in 2019.

In 2016, amidst the public uproar about the police shootings of two African-American men, Alton Sterling and Philando Castile, and two deadly attacks against police officers in Dallas and Baton Rouge, Jordan made $1 million donations to the NAACP Legal Defense Fund and the Institute for Community-Police Relations. He said:

I can no longer stay silent. We need to find solutions that ensure people of color receive fair and equal treatment AND that police officers – who put their lives on the line every day to protect us all – are respected and supported.

In 2018, Jordan donated proceeds from The Last Dance to Friends of the Children, a nonprofit mentoring organization.

On June 5, 2020, in the wake of the protests following the murder of George Floyd, Jordan and his brand announced that they would be donating $100 million over 10 years to organizations dedicated to "ensuring racial equality, social justice and greater access to education". In February 2021, Jordan funded two Novant Health Michael Jordan Family Clinics in New Hanover County, North Carolina, by giving $10 million. In 2024, he funded the opening of another Novant Health Clinic, this time in Wilmington.

=== Film and television ===
Jordan played himself in the 1996 film Space Jam. In 2000, Jordan was the subject of an IMAX documentary about his career with the Chicago Bulls, especially the 1998 NBA playoffs, titled Michael Jordan to the Max. Two decades later, the same period of Jordan's life was covered in much greater and more personal detail by the Emmy Award-winning The Last Dance, a TV documentary which debuted on ESPN in 2020. The Last Dance relied on about 500 hours of candid film of Jordan's and his teammates' off-court activities which an NBA Entertainment crew had shot during the 1997–98 NBA season. The project was delayed for many years because Jordan had not yet given his permission for the footage to be used. Jordan appeared in the 2022 miniseries The Captain, which follows the life and career of Derek Jeter. In 2023, the events about the origin of the Air Jordan brand were dramatized in the film Air.

In May 2025, Jordan was announced as a special contributor for the revived NBA on NBC; his role was later revealed to be MJ: Insights to Excellence, a segment featuring excerpts from an interview he conducted with NBC's Mike Tirico.

=== Books ===
Jordan has authored several books:

- Rare Air: Michael on Michael, with Mark Vancil and Walter Iooss (Harper San Francisco, 1993).
- I Can't Accept Not Trying: Michael Jordan on the Pursuit of Excellence, with Mark Vancil and Sandro Miller (Harper San Francisco, 1994).
- For the Love of the Game: My Story, with Mark Vancil (Crown Publishers, 1998).
- Driven from Within, with Mark Vancil (Atria Books, 2005).

== See also ==
- Forbes' list of the world's highest-paid athletes
- List of athletes who came out of retirement
- List of most valuable celebrity memorabilia
- List of multi-sport athletes
- List of NBA teams by single season win percentage
- List of sports figures considered the greatest
- African-American upper class
- Black billionaires
- Black elite
- Michael Jordan's Restaurant – Restaurant and sports bar in Chicago, Illinois, US
- Video games
  - Jordan vs. Bird: One on One – 1988 sports video game
  - Michael Jordan in Flight – 1993 sports video game
  - Michael Jordan: Chaos in the Windy City – 1994 video game
  - NBA 2K11 – 2010 basketball video game
  - NBA 2K12 – 2011 basketball video game

== Sources ==
- Andrews, David L.; Carrington, Ben; Jackson, Steven J.; Mazur, Zbigniew (1996). "Jordanscapes: A Preliminary Analysis of the Global Popular". Sociology of Sport Journal. 13 (4): 428–457. doi:10.1123/ssj.13.4.428. ISSN 0741-1235.
- Condor, Bob (1998). Michael Jordan's 50 Greatest Games. Carol Publishing Group. ISBN 978-0-8065-2030-8.
- Halberstam, David (2000). Playing for Keeps: Michael Jordan and the World He Made. Broadway Books. ISBN 978-0-7679-0444-5.
- Jordan, Michael (1998). For the Love of the Game: My Story. New York City: Crown Publishers. ISBN 978-0-609-60206-5.
- Kruger, Mitchell (2003). One Last Shot: The Story of Michael Jordan's Comeback. New York City: St. Martin's Paperbacks. ISBN 978-0-312-99223-1.
- Lazenby, Roland (2014). Michael Jordan: The Life. New York City: Little, Brown and Company. ISBN 978-0-316-19477-8.
- LaFeber, Walter (2002). Michael Jordan and the New Global Capitalism. W. W. Norton. p. 32. ISBN 978-0-393-32369-6.
- Markovits, Andrei S.; Rensmann, Lars (June 3, 2010). Gaming the World: How Sports are Reshaping Global Politics and Culture. Princeton University Press. ISBN 978-0-691-13751-3.
- Porter, David L. (2007). Michael Jordan: A Biography. Greenwood Publishing Group. ISBN 978-0-313-33767-3.
- Puro, George; Sachare, Alex; Veltrop, Kevin, eds. (1994). The Sporting News Official NBA Register 1994–95. St. Louis, Missouri: Sporting News Publishing Company. ISBN 978-0-89204-501-3.
- Vogan, Travis (2018). ABC Sports: The Rise and Fall of Network Sports Television. University of California Press. ISBN 978-0-520-96626-0 – via JSTOR.
