= Stop It =

Stop It may refer to:

- Stop It (single album), by B.A.P, 2012
- "Stop It" (song), by Anarchic System, 1976
- "Stop It", a song by French Montana from Jungle Rules, 2017
- "Stop it. Get some help.", internet meme taken from PSA, 1987
