= Crying Jordan =

Internet meme

The original Associated Press photograph

Crying Jordan, also known as Crying MJ, Crying Michael Jordan, or Weepy J is an Internet meme in which an image of NBA Hall of Famer Michael Jordan crying is superimposed on images of athletes or others who have suffered various mishaps.

== Creation and timeline ==
The source photo was taken by Associated Press photographer Stephan Savoia during Jordan's speech at his Basketball Hall of Fame induction ceremony on September 11, 2009.

The image was used in 2012, without modification, to comment on Jordan's decision to buy the Charlotte Bobcats NBA franchise. The photoshopped head alone was first used in 2014 by posters on internet message board Boxden.com.

"Crying Jordan" began to attract mainstream media attention in late 2015 and early 2016 and would eventually become a globally used internet meme.

After Game 6 of the 2021 NBA Finals, in which the Milwaukee Bucks defeated the Phoenix Suns to win the championship, a media producer purchased the domain CryingJordan.com and sent a re-direct to Chris Paul's profile page on the Phoenix Suns website.

Media critics have suggested that the popularity of the meme stems in part because "[i]t's the ultimate alpha [male] in a vulnerable position", and that "people simultaneously mock and celebrate ... a masculine star who expresses vulnerability".

== Usage ==
Outside the Internet world, the meme has been referenced in interviews by various athletes and public figures, such as basketball player Draymond Green, professional golfer Jordan Spieth, and the rapper Schoolboy Q. Various athletes, like Stephen Curry, Jon Jones and Roberto Luongo have also used the image self-deprecatingly on social media after struggling or failing in games, or having suffered some other misfortune. Outside of sports, the image has also been used in combination with images of politicians like Barack Obama and Marco Rubio. The meme is still in use today in popular Facebook groups such as Crying Jordan Meme Fans, and has inspired similar meme faces such as Uncle Denzel, Uncle Shay, and the infamous "Big Ern".

== Ties to Jordan ==
The meme was heavily used after North Carolina (Jordan's alma mater) lost to Villanova in the 2016 National Championship, during which Jordan was in attendance. On November 22, 2016, when awarding a Presidential Medal of Freedom to Jordan, President Barack Obama joked that he was "more than just an internet meme". Jordan's spokesperson has told the press that Jordan himself finds the meme funny.

On February 24, 2020, Jordan eulogized the death of former Los Angeles Lakers star Kobe Bryant (whom Jordan was great friends with) and his daughter Gianna at an event held at the Staples Center in Los Angeles, California. During the eulogy, Jordan began to cry and acknowledged—to great laughter— that this might give rise to another Crying Meme accordingly, stating: "Now he's got me [crying]. I'll have to look at another Crying Meme ... I told my wife I wasn't going to do this because I didn't want to see that for the next three or four years. That is what Kobe Bryant does to me."

== See also ==
- Stop it. Get some help.
