= Stop it. Get some help. =

Internet meme derived from an anti-drug PSA

A screenshot from the beginning of the advertisement.

"Stop it. Get some help." is an internet meme taken from a 1987 anti-drug public service announcement (PSA) presented by American NBA star Michael Jordan in collaboration with the fast food corporation McDonald's. The PSA was produced by McDonald's to increase sales during the contemporary "Just Say No" anti-drug ad campaign, supported by the United States federal government and several other companies under the influence of Reaganite ideals. The PSA itself consists of Jordan warning about the dangers of drug abuse in a direct address to younger audiences. A segment of the PSA became an internet meme expressing humorous disagreement, beginning in the 2010s with the video hosting platform Vine.

== Background ==
During the 1980s, Michael Jordan was an American basketball player who became nationally renowned for his prowess as a star player for the Chicago Bulls. (This was shortly before he became a household name, recognizable even to most non-basketball fans.) Popularizing the sport to outsiders, he secured various sponsorship deals, including one with Nike to promote the Air Jordan brand of basketball shoes, released in 1985. Around the same time, the American fast-food restaurant chain McDonald's had over 7,500 outlets worldwide by 1984, and was promoting the message of "Just Say No" in the United States in order to increase sales. "Just Say No" was an American mass advertising campaign in the 1980s supported by the United States federal government and several companies which promoted awareness of the harms of drug abuse to children. Influenced by Reaganite ideals, the message of the campaign was intended to emphasize personal responsibility while negating institutional racism as a cause of drug abuse.

== Public service announcement ==
McDonald's produced the advertisement in collaboration with Jordan, with the American Broadcasting Company (ABC) airing the televised PSA on May 26, 1987. The PSA, one minute in length, features Jordan in a tan suit speaking to the viewer about the harmful effects of drug abuse. Speaking directly to children, he warns that drug abuse will deny long-term hopes and wishes to the youthful. Throughout the advertisement, Jordan is presented as a role model for youths and pleads to them the following:

So don't blow it, don't do drugs. If you're doing it, stop it. Get some help. McDonald's wants you to give yourself a chance, a chance to find out the wonderful things you can really be. And so do I.

=== Analysis ===
According to the 2002 book Sport Stars: The Cultural Politics of Sporting Celebrity, the advertisement positions Jordan as a role model whose declaration of abstinence from narcotics signifies his moral worth and juxtaposes himself from drug addicts in predominantly Black urban communities. The example of Jordan, along with other success stories of Black Americans of the time, is therefore used to condemn "the struggling African American masses for lacking the personal resolution which, according to Reaganism's doctrine of rugged individualism and color-blind bigotry, was all that was required to achieve in American society."

== Legacy ==
Following the PSA, Jordan would continue collaborating with McDonald's, with the restaurant chain eventually releasing the "McJordan Special", a sandwich named after the basketballer.

By October 2021, Chaitanya Dadhwal of EssentiallySports said that the advertisement had "gained a lot of recognition on the internet" although for a different reason than was originally intended by the producers of the PSA: initially viral on the social media Vine before it was shut down in 2017, a segment from the advertisement where Jordan says "Stop it. Get some help." became an internet meme as a humorous message indicating disagreement.

== See also ==
- Crying Jordan
