= Andrei Markovits =

Romanian-American comparative politics scholar

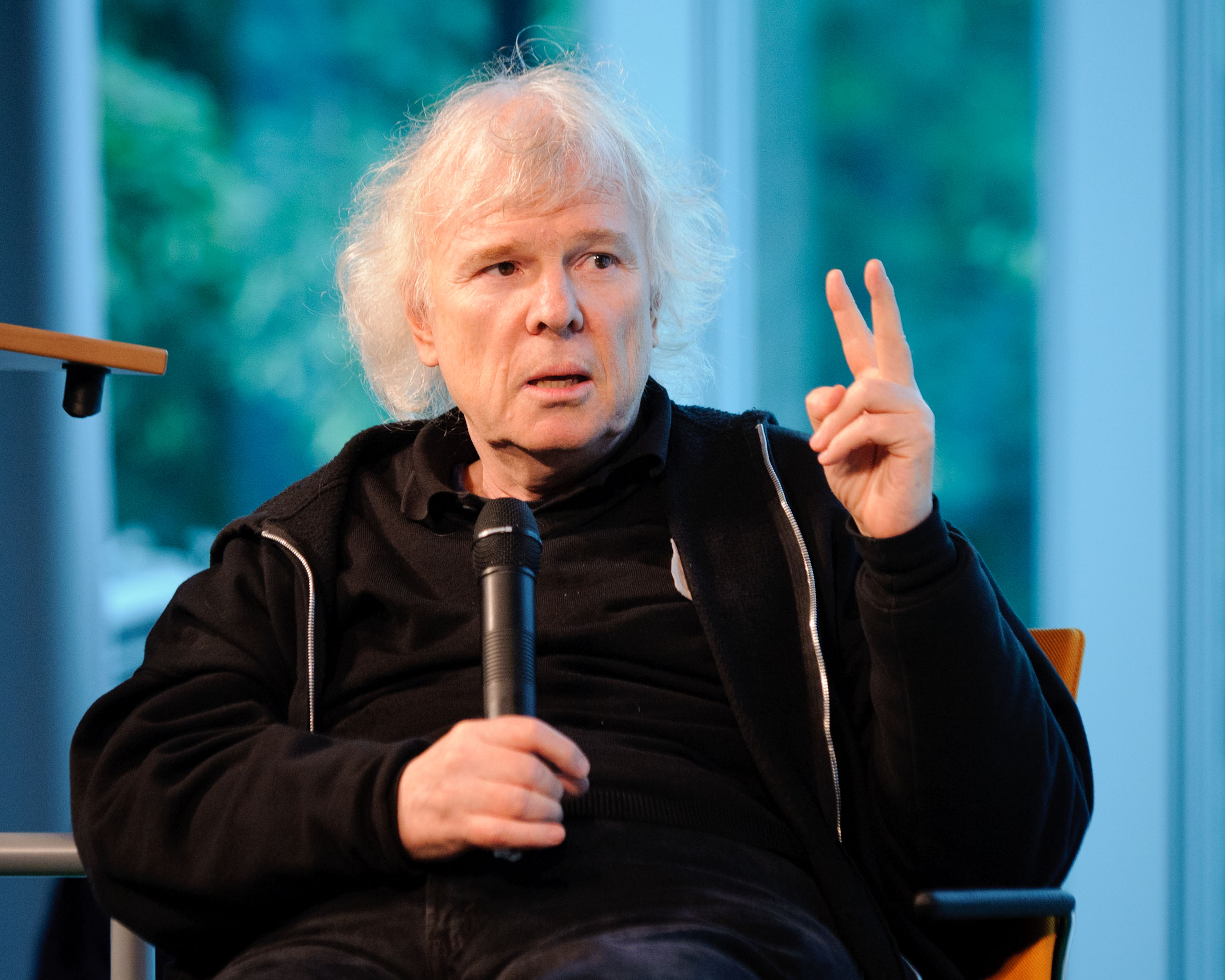
- Markovits in 2011
- Born: October 1948 (age 77–78); Timișoara, Romania

Academic background
- Education: Columbia University (BA, MBA, PhD)

Academic work
- Discipline: Political science
- Sub-discipline: Comparative politics
- Institutions: Wesleyan University; University of California, Santa Cruz; University of Michigan

Andrei S. Markovits is an Arthur F. Thurnau Professor Emeritus and the Karl W. Deutsch Collegiate Professor of Comparative Politics and German Studies Emeritus at the University of Michigan. He is the author and editor of many books, scholarly articles, conference papers, book reviews and newspaper contributions in English and many foreign languages on topics as varied as German and Austrian politics, anti-Semitism, anti-Americanism, social democracy, social movements, the European right and the European left. Markovits has also worked extensively on comparative sports culture in Europe and North America. In August 2021, Markovits published a memoir entitled The Passport as Home: Comfort in Rootlessness.

== Biography ==
=== Early years ===
Markovits was born in October 1948 in the city of Timișoara in western Romania. He was raised as the single child of a middle-class Jewish family, speaking German and Hungarian at home. In school he learned Romanian, and from his early childhood he was tutored in English—later in French as well. Thus, his multilingual identity dates back to his childhood as well as the polyglot part of the world where he grew up. At the age of nine, he and his father emigrated from Romania, first to Vienna and then to New York, the two cities that would play the most important roles in his upbringing. Between 1959 and 1967, he spent the school year in Vienna, and the summer months in New York.

=== University and post-doctoral education ===
After graduating from Vienna's Theresianische Akademie with a Matura degree, Markovits enrolled at Columbia University in New York City where he completed all of his post-secondary education, acquiring five degrees in the process. He studied political science, economics, sociology, and business administration. After receiving his doctorate in political science in 1976, he went to the Center for European Studies at Harvard University of which he would remain an active member and a research associate until June 1999.

=== Institutional affiliations ===
At the Harvard Center for European Studies, Markovits chaired study groups on German politics and on Jews in modern Europe. In 1983, he founded the quarterly journal German Politics and Society. He was actively involved in the center's academic programs, and has credited its interdisciplinary environment as an influence on his scholarly development.

Between 1977 and 1983, Markovits was an assistant professor in the Department of Government at Wesleyan University. Thereafter, he joined the faculty at Boston University where he was associate professor in the Department of Political Science from 1983 until 1992. He then became professor in the Department of Politics at the University of California, Santa Cruz which he chaired until 1995 and where he remained until joining the faculty at the University of Michigan on September 1, 1999.

In addition, he has held academic appointments at a number of universities overseas. Among them have been Dortmund University, Osnabrück University, Lüneburg University, and Bochum University in Germany; the University of Vienna, Innsbruck University, and the Vienna campus of Webster University in Austria; St. Gallen University in Switzerland; and The Hebrew University and Tel Aviv University in Israel. In 1998-1999, Markovits served as a fellow at the Wissenschaftskolleg zu Berlin, Institute for Advanced Study. Markovits was also a Fellow in 2008–2009 at the Center for Advanced Study in the Behavioral Sciences (CASBS) at Stanford University.

=== Areas of research and publication ===
A specialist on the politics of Western and Central Europe—Germany and Austria in particular—Markovits has published nineteen authored and co-authored books as well as edited and co-edited volumes; in addition, he has contributed numerous scholarly articles and review essays as well as articles and interviews in the American and European press. Markovits's research interests and areas of publication include German and European labor, German and European social democracy, German-Jewish relations; Germany's role in the new Europe, Anti-Americanism in Europe, the comparative sociology of modern sports cultures, and the varied dimensions of the human-animal bond.

=== Teaching career ===
Markovits has won a number of teaching awards at the institutions with which he was affiliated during his academic career. At the University of California, Santa Cruz, he was awarded the "Excellence in Teaching Award" in 1997. At the University of Michigan, he was bestowed the Tronstein Award in 2007 and 2016 for being the best teacher in the Department of Political Science and the Golden Apple Award for being the best instructor on the University of Michigan's Ann Arbor campus.

On March 15, 2009, Markovits received the Arthur F. Thurnau professorship from the University of Michigan. Supported for by the Thurnau Charitable Trust, the Thurnau Professorship is annually bestowed upon five or six tenured faculty from the University of Michigan in recognition of commitment to and investment in undergraduate teaching which has had a significant impact on the intellectual development of their students.

Markovits has advised doctoral dissertations at many major American universities, as well as universities in Great Britain, France, Germany, Austria, Holland, Switzerland, Canada and Israel. On July 4, 2007, Markovits was awarded a Dr. Phil. honoris causa (an honorary doctorate) by the Faculty of Social Sciences of the Lüneburg University in Lüneburg, Germany. In a ceremony on November 5, 2025, Markovits received his second honorary doctorate from the University of Passau, awarded by the Faculty of Social and Educational Sciences.

=== Bundesverdienstkreuz erster Klasse ===
Markovits was bestowed the Bundesverdienstkreuz erster Klasse by the president of the Federal Republic of Germany. The Consul General of the Federal Republic of Germany in Chicago handed this award to Markovits on March 14, 2012. This award is one of the highest honors the Federal Republic of Germany rewards to any civilian, German or foreign.

== Current work ==
Markovits's academic work comprises three areas of research: first and foremost, he has published a book on anti-Americanism and anti-Semitism in Europe, entitled Uncouth Nation: Why Europe Dislikes America and published by Princeton University Press. This work analyzes resentment towards things American in seven European countries. Going beyond the conventional realm of politics, Markovits argues that such resentment pervades quotidian culture and discourse. A German edition, Amerika, dich hasst sich's Besser: Antiamerikanismus Und Antisemitismus in Europa, was published in 2004. An Italian edition entitled La nazione più odiata was published in 2007, along with a Korean edition published in 2008.

Second, Markovits continues his work on sports. In particular, he has recently published two books in English: Gaming The World: How Sports Are Reshaping Global Politics and Culture, published by Princeton University Press and Sportista: Female Fandom in the United States, published by Temple University Press. His work on sports has appeared in many languages, including two recent books in German entitled Querpass: Sport und Politik in Europa und den USA and Sport: Motor und Impulssystem für Emanzipation und Diskriminierung.

Third, Markovits published a book entitled From Property to Family: American Dog Rescue and the Discourse of Compassion, with the University of Michigan Press. This book describes a "discourse of compassion" that actually alters the way we treat persons and ideas once scorned by the social mainstream. This "culture turn" has also affected our treatment of animals, creating an accompanying "animal turn" which changed them from property to family. One of the new institutions created by this attitudinal and behavioral change towards dogs has been the breed specific canine rescue organization, which is the focus of Markovits's book. For this work, Markovits received the University of Michigan Press Book Award in 2015.

Beyond academic work, in 2021, Markovits published his memoir The Passport as Home: Comfort in Rootlessness, wherein he discusses his childhood in the west Romanian multicultural city of Timisoara, Vienna and New York, his college years at Columbia University, his close postdoctoral association with the Center for European Studies at Harvard University, and his career at the University of Michigan. His writing touches on his interests in sports, dog rescue, the Grateful Dead, and other topics. A German translation of the memoir was published in the fall of 2022 by Neofelis Verlag in Berlin, and a Romanian translation followed in 2023 published by Editura Hasefer.

== Notable publications ==
=== Memoirs ===
- The Passport as Home: Comfort in Rootlessness

=== German politics ===
- From Bundesrepublik to Deutschland: German Politics after Unification
- German Politics and Society
- The German Left: Red, Green, and Beyond
- The German Predicament: Memory & Power in the New Europe
- The Politics of the West German Trade Unions: Strategies of class and interest representation in growth and crisis

=== Anti-Americanism ===
- Uncouth Nation: Why Europe Dislikes America
- Amerika, dich haßt sich's besser

=== University of Michigan/Jewish Students History ===
- Hillel at Michigan, 1926/27-1945: Struggles of Jewish Identity in a Pivotal Era (with Kenneth Garner) - 2016
- The Boundaries of Pluralism: The World of the University of Michigan's Jewish Students from 1897 to 1945 (with Kenneth Garner)

=== Sport ===
- Offside: Soccer and American Exceptionalism (with Steven L. Hellerman)
- Sports Culture Among Undergraduates: A Study of Student-athletes and Students at the University of Michigan
- Gaming the World: How Sports are Reshaping Global Politics and Culture (with Lars Rensmann)
