= Stephan Savoia =

Pulitzer Prize–winning American photojournalist

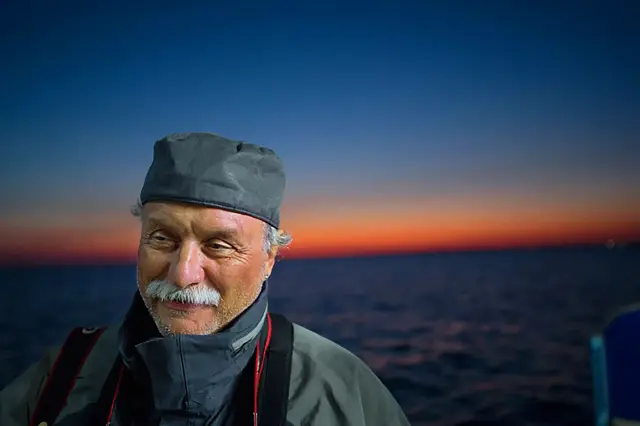
Stephan Savoia on assignment aboard the research vessel M/V OCEARCH tagging Great White Sharks off Cape Cod, Massachusetts.

Stephan Savoia is an American photojournalist who has worked for several daily newspapers and the Associated Press during his 42-year career. He has been recognized twice by the Pulitzer Prize Board as a member of two winning Associated Press Feature Photography teams.

== Early life and education ==
Savoia was born in New York City and raised in its metropolitan area. He earned a bachelor's degree from the State University of New York at Potsdam, where he majored in sociology and social theory and minored in art and photography. He later completed a master's degree in journalism at the University of Missouri, where he studied under photojournalist Angus McDougall. In 2005, Savoia was awarded an honorary Doctorate of Fine Arts by SUNY Potsdam in recognition of his contributions to visual journalism.

== Career ==
Savoia began his photography career while working on The Racquette, the student newspaper at SUNY Potsdam. After completing his master's degree at the University of Missouri, he worked as a staff photojournalist for newspapers in Monroe and Baton Rouge, Louisiana. In November 1990, he joined the Associated Press. From 1990 to 2005, he served as a national staff photographer based in Boston, and continued with the AP as a staff photographer until his retirement in 2018.

The 1993 Pulitzer Prize for Feature Photography recognized the AP "portfolio of images drawn from the 1992 presidential campaign". Savoia was the lead campaign photojournalist covering Bill Clinton’s presidential bid. The 1999 Prize recognized a collection of images from the Clinton–Lewinsky scandal and ensuing impeachment hearings. Savoia photographed key figures, including Clinton’s personal secretary Betty Currie and her attorney Lawrence Wechsler.

== Notable coverage ==
Savoia's major assignments with the Associated Press included:

- Coverage of U.S. presidential campaigns:
  - Lead AP photographer for Bill Clinton’s 1992 campaign, part of the Pulitzer-winning AP team
  - Lead AP photographer for Bob Dole’s 1996 campaign
  - Coverage of Steve Forbes’s 1996 campaign
  - John McCain’s 2000 and 2008 campaigns
  - Al Gore’s 2000 campaign
- 1992 Summer Olympics in Barcelona
- Major aviation disasters: Swissair Flight 111, EgyptAir Flight 990, and the plane crash of John F. Kennedy Jr.
- The 1999 creation of Nunavut and cultural documentation of Inuit communities in northern Canada
- International summits and protests: WTO protests in Seattle (1999), 2001 Summit of the Americas in Quebec City, the G7 Summit, and APEC meetings
- McCain–Feingold campaign finance reform debates in the U.S. Senate
- Major U.S. sports: Super Bowl, NCAA basketball tournaments, and Major League Baseball
- A widely circulated image of Michael Jordan crying at the 2009 Basketball Hall of Fame induction, which later became the viral "Crying Jordan" meme
- Among the first AP photojournalists to use the Kodak NC2000 digital camera, Savoia transmitted one of the first globally published digital news images from the 1994 Woodstock music festival

== Publications and exhibitions ==
Savoia’s work has appeared in:

- The Pulitzer Prize Photographs: Capture the Moment
- Breaking News: How the Associated Press Has Covered War, Peace and Everything Else
- Flash! The Associated Press Covers the World
- Glasgow: Story of a Missouri Rivertown

== Teaching and professional involvement ==
Savoia has lectured and presented on photojournalism at various universities and professional workshops. He served as a judge for the Pictures of the Year International (POYi), the National Press Photographers Association’s Best of Photojournalism competition, and the Boston Press Photographers Association’s college contests. He also served as President of the Boston Press Photographers Association from 2016 to 2020.

In 2025, Savoia became the president of the f4 & See It Foundation, a Massachusetts-based nonprofit dedicated to supporting impactful photojournalism and documentary photography. The organization promotes the thoughtful and purposeful telling of visual stories, drawing on Savoia’s own philosophy of photojournalism. The foundation’s name, coined by Savoia, is a play on the phrase "f/8 and be there", reimagined as "f4 and See It" to reflect a more deliberate and emotionally aware approach to visual storytelling.
