= Jack Joyce (businessman) =

American lawyer

Jack Joyce (December 10, 1942 – May 27, 2014) was an American business executive, lawyer who co-founded Rogue Ales in Ashland, Oregon, in 1988. The Portland Business Journal has called Joyce, "One of the men most responsible for Oregon's reputation as one of the nation's preeminent beer-making regions." Joyce was also one of the original executives at Nike during the company's early years. Rogue Ales was producing 105,000 barrels by 2013, ranking it among the top twenty-five craft breweries in the United States.

Jack Joyce graduated from the University of Oregon, where he was a member of the Theta Chi fraternity. In 1962, Joyce became friends with one of his fellow fraternity member, Bob Woodell. Joyce and Woodell eventually become executives at Nike. They would also co-found Rogue Ales in 1988.

Joyce began his career as a lawyer and criminal defense attorney. He joined Nike, Inc. around in 1983, where he worked as an executive and attorney for about six years. Joyce, one of the company's first business executives, helped to lay foundations for Nike's future growth. He partnered with another company executive, Rob Strasser, to lower Nike's expenses during the 1980s. Joyce also led Nike's efforts to compete against one of Nike's main rivals, Reebok, which had unexpectedly achieved success with a competing line of aerobics shoes.

In 1988, Joyce joined with two other Nike executives, Bob Woodell and Rob Strasser, to co-found Rogue Ales and Spirits in Ashland, Oregon. Rogue Ales opened its first flagship brew pub in 1989 on the Newport, Oregon, waterfront. Joyce had found the Newport location and felt it was a better site than the original brewery in Ashland.

Joyce also owned and operated dozens of acres of farmland in Corvallis, Oregon, calling himself a "farming lawyer." The Rogue Ales company formerly leased Rogue Farms Hopyard, in Independence, Oregon, which it offered farmhouse accommodations, beer tastings and wedding venues.

Joyce died from a heart attack in Hawaii on May 27, 2014, at the age of 71. His survivors include his son, Brett Joyce, the former President of Rogue Ales and former employee of Adidas and Fila, and his daughter, Anna Joyce, the Solicitor General of Oregon.
