= 6th Hollywood Critics Association Midseason Film Awards =

Hollywood Critics Association Midseason Film Awards

- Date: June 30, 2023
- Official website: hollywoodcreative.org

Highlights
- Best Picture: Spider-Man: Across the Spider-Verse
- Most awards: Past Lives (3)
- Most nominations: Air; Past Lives (7)

The winners of the 6th Hollywood Critics Association Midseason Film Awards, presented by the Hollywood Critics Association, were announced on June 30, 2023, on the association's official Twitter page.

The nominations were announced on June 27, 2023. Air and Past Lives led the nominations with seven each, followed by Are You There God? It's Me, Margaret. with six; Asteroid City, BlackBerry, John Wick: Chapter 4, and Spider-Man: Across the Spider-Verse received three each.

Past Lives received the most awards with three wins, including Best Actress (Greta Lee), followed by Air and Spider-Man: Across the Spider-Verse with two wins each; the latter won Best Picture and Best Director (Joaquim Dos Santos, Kemp Powers, and Justin K. Thompson).

== Winners and nominees ==
Winners are listed first and highlighted with boldface

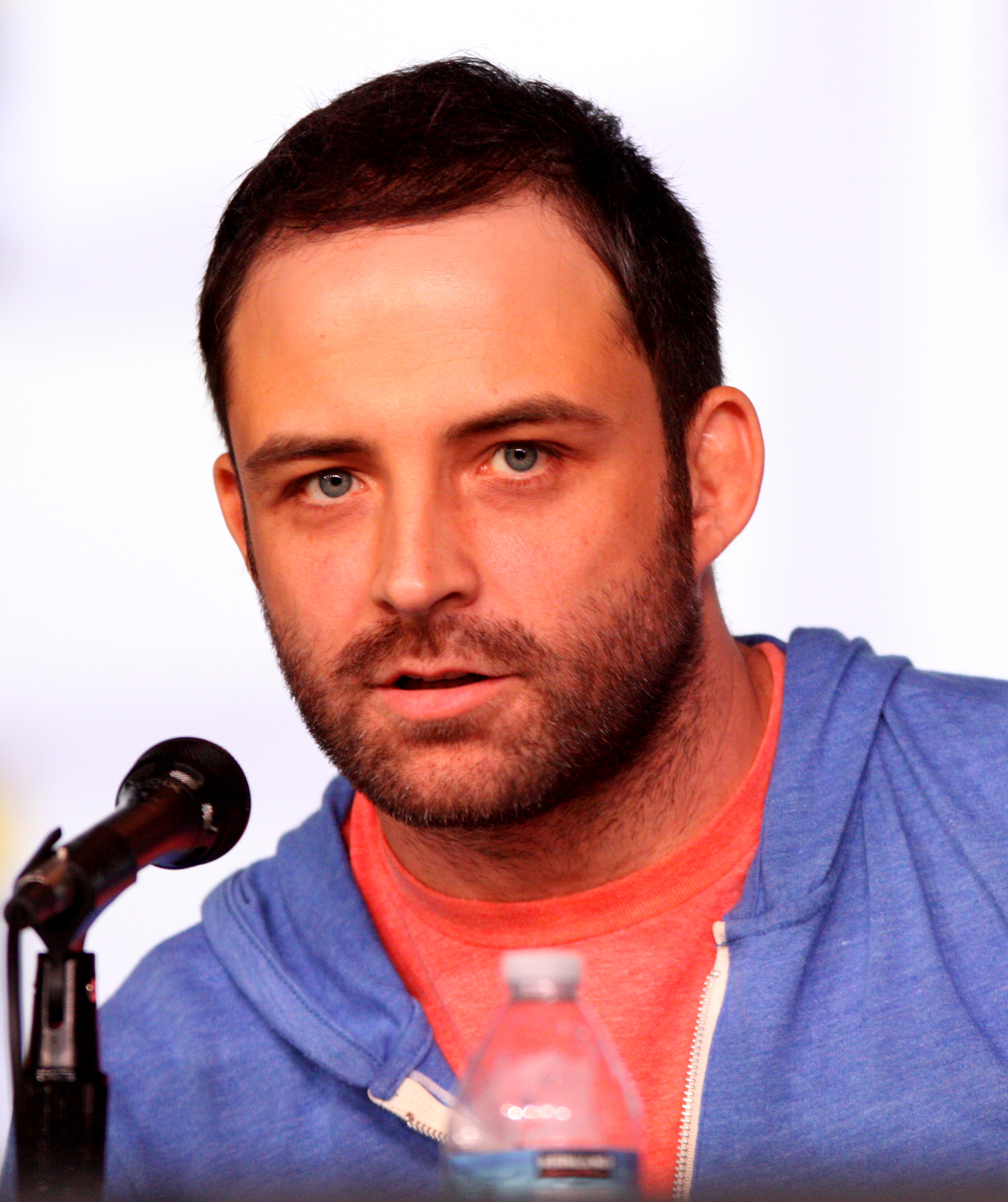
Joaquim Dos Santos, Best Director co-winner

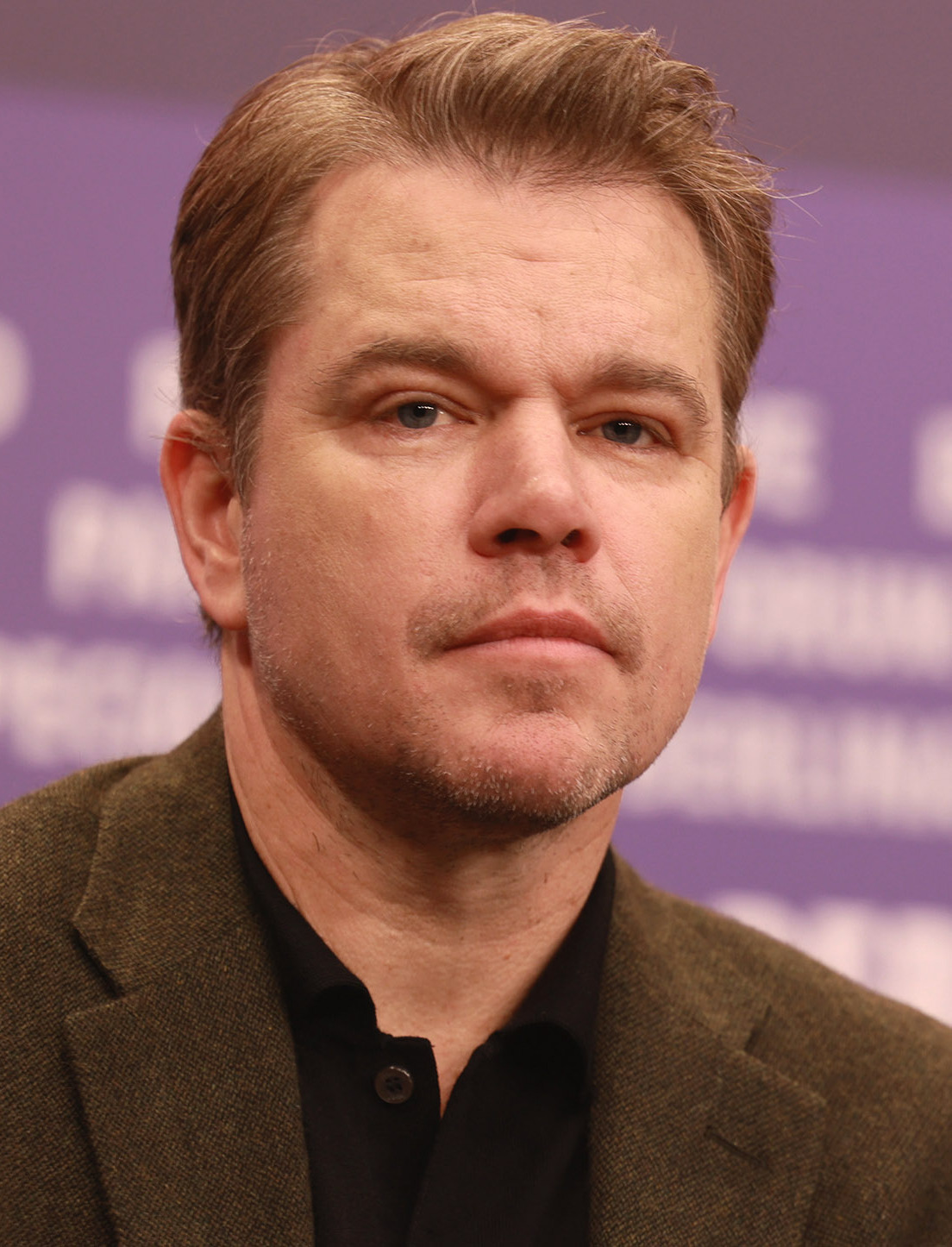
Matt Damon, Best Actor winner

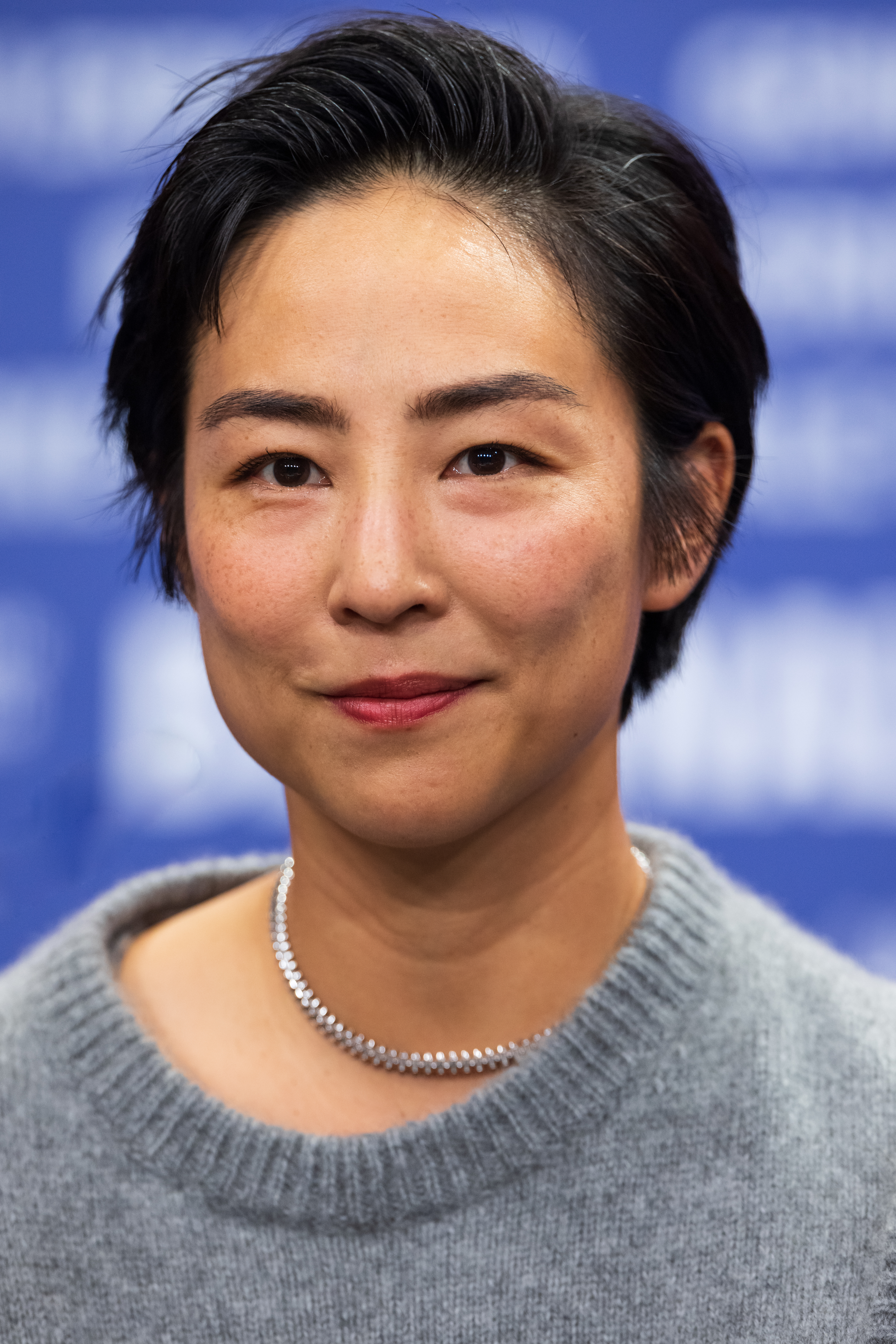
Greta Lee, Best Actress winner

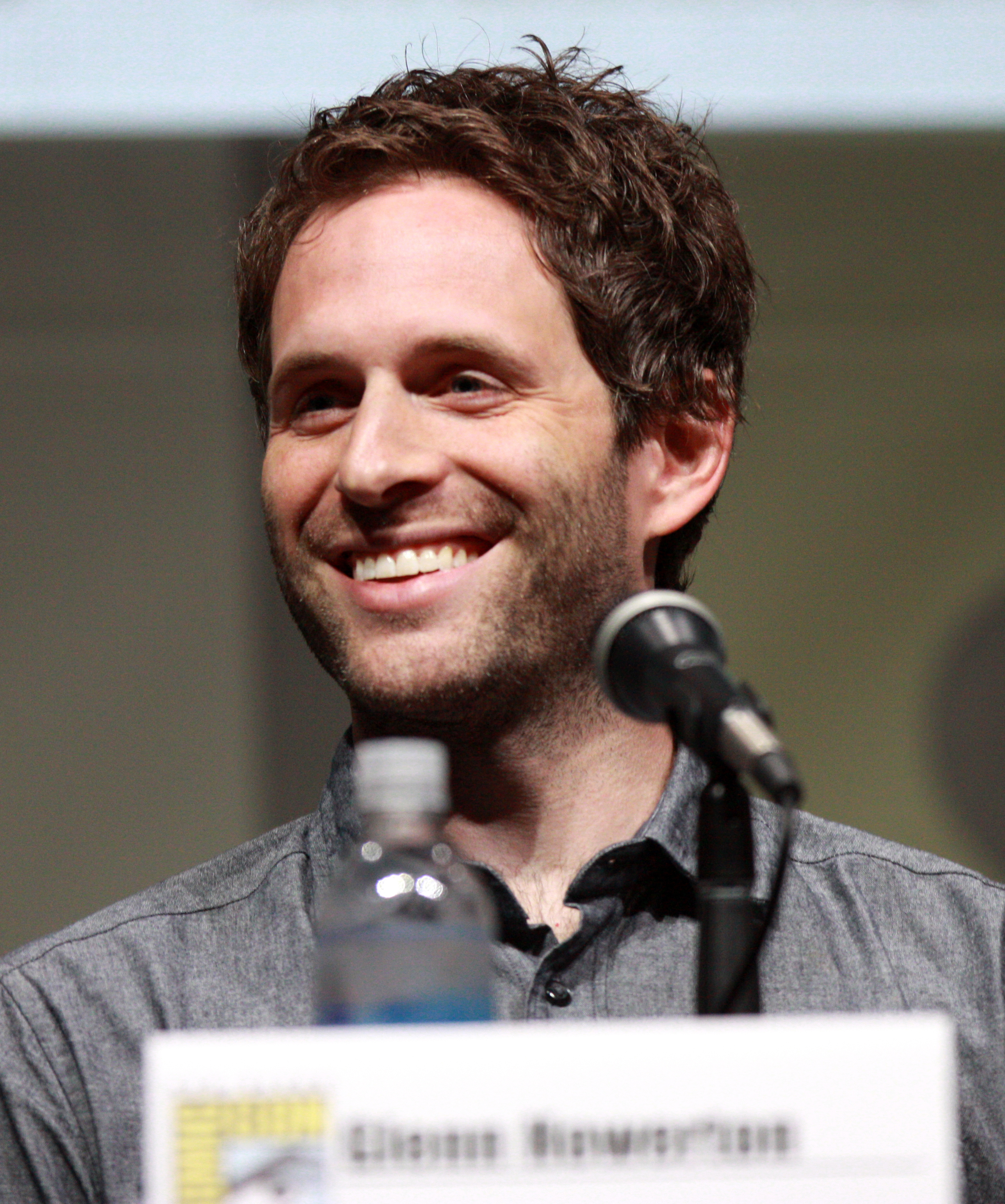
Glenn Howerton, Best Supporting Actor winner

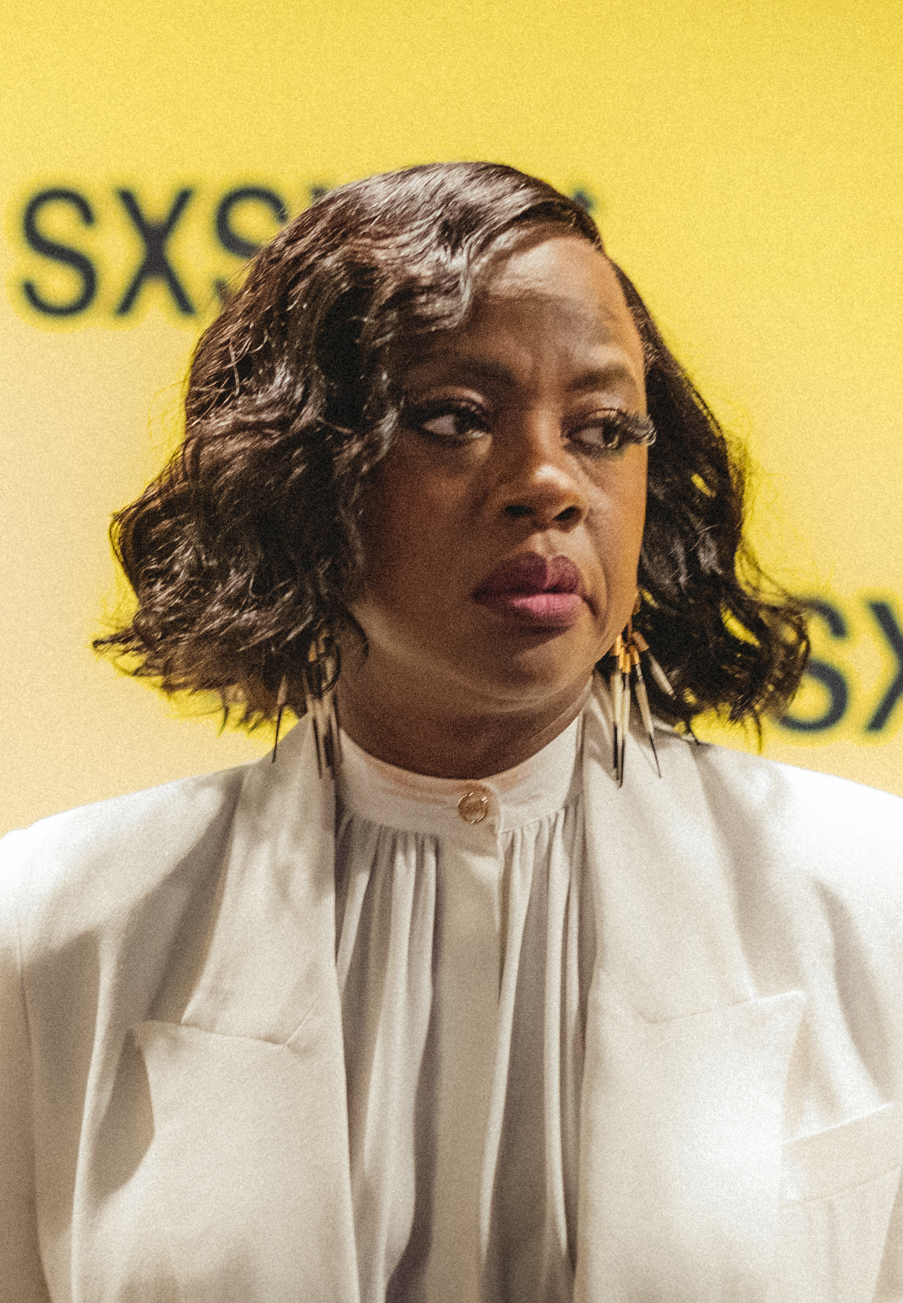
Viola Davis, Best Supporting Actress winner

**Best Picture**: **Spider-Man: Across the Spider-Verse**; Runner-up: Past Lives; Air; Are You There God? It's Me, Margaret.; Asteroid City; BlackBerry; Creed III; Dungeons & Dragons: Honor Among Thieves; Guardians of the Galaxy Vol. 3; John Wick: Chapter 4	**Best Director**: **Joaquim Dos Santos, Kemp Powers, and Justin K. Thompson – Spider-Man: Across the Spider-Verse**; Runner-up: Celine Song – Past Lives; Ben Affleck – Air; Chad Stahelski – John Wick: Chapter 4; Kelly Fremon Craig – Are You There God? It's Me, Margaret.
**Best Actor**: **Matt Damon – Air as Sonny Vaccaro**; Runner-up: Teo Yoo – Past Lives as Hae Sung; Joaquin Phoenix – Beau Is Afraid as Beau Wassermann; Michael B. Jordan – Creed III as Adonis "Donnie" Creed; Taron Egerton – Tetris as Henk Rogers	**Best Actress**: **Greta Lee – Past Lives as Nora**; Runner-up: Abby Ryder Fortson – Are You There God? It's Me, Margaret. as Margaret Simon; Julia Louis-Dreyfus – You Hurt My Feelings as Beth; Mia Goth – Infinity Pool as Gabi Bauer; Teyana Taylor – A Thousand and One as Inez de la Paz
**Best Supporting Actor**: **Glenn Howerton – BlackBerry as Jim Balsillie**; Runner-up: Jason Momoa – Fast X as Dante Reyes; Ben Affleck – Air as Phil Knight; Chris Messina – Air as David Falk; John Magaro – Past Lives as Arthur	**Best Supporting Actress**: **Viola Davis – Air as Deloris Jordan**; Runner-up: Rachel McAdams – Are You There God? It's Me, Margaret. as Barbara Simon; Kathy Bates – Are You There God? It's Me, Margaret. as Sylvia Simon; Patti LuPone – Beau Is Afraid as Mona Wassermann; Scarlett Johansson – Asteroid City as Midge Campbell
**Best Screenplay**: **Celine Song – Past Lives**; Runner-up: Alex Convery – Air; Kelly Fremon Craig – Are You There God? It's Me, Margaret.; Phil Lord, Chris Miller, and Dave Callaham – Spider-Man: Across the Spider-Verse; Wes Anderson – Asteroid City	**Best Horror**: **M3GAN**; Runner-up: Evil Dead Rise; Infinity Pool; Knock at the Cabin; Scream VI
**Best Indie**: **Past Lives**; Runner-up: BlackBerry; Rye Lane; A Thousand and One; You Hurt My Feelings	**Best Stunts**: **John Wick: Chapter 4**; Runner-up: Polite Society; Dungeons & Dragons: Honor Among Thieves; Extraction 2; Fast X
**Most Anticipated Film**: **Barbie**; Runner-up: Oppenheimer; Dune: Part Two; Killers of the Flower Moon; Mission: Impossible – Dead Reckoning Part One

== Films with multiple wins ==
The following films received multiple awards:

Wins	Film
3	Past Lives
2	Air
2	Spider-Man: Across the Spider-Verse

== Films with multiple nominations ==
The following films received multiple nominations:

Nominations	Film
7	Air
7	Past Lives
6	Are You There God? It's Me, Margaret.
3	Asteroid City
3	BlackBerry
3	John Wick: Chapter 4
3	Spider-Man: Across the Spider-Verse
2	Beau Is Afraid
2	Creed III
2	Dungeons & Dragons: Honor Among Thieves
2	Fast X
2	Infinity Pool
2	A Thousand and One
2	You Hurt My Feelings

== See also ==
- 3rd Astra TV Awards
- 7th Astra Film Awards
- 2nd Astra Creative Arts Awards
