= Are You There God? It's Me, Margaret. (film) =

2023 film by Kelly Fremon Craig

- Theatrical release poster
- Directed by: Kelly Fremon Craig
- Screenplay by: Kelly Fremon Craig
- Based on: Are You There God? It's Me, Margaret. by Judy Blume
- Produced by: James L. Brooks; Julie Ansell; Richard Sakai; Kelly Fremon Craig; Judy Blume; Amy Lorraine Brooks; Aldric La'auli Porter
- Starring: Rachel McAdams; Abby Ryder Fortson; Elle Graham; Benny Safdie; Kathy Bates
- Cinematography: Tim Ives
- Edited by: Nick Moore; Oona Flaherty
- Music by: Hans Zimmer
- Production company: Gracie Films
- Distributed by: Lionsgate
- Release dates: April 23, 2023 (SFIFF); April 28, 2023 (United States)
- Running time: 106 minutes
- Country: United States
- Language: English
- Budget: $30 million
- Box office: $21.5 million

Are You There God? It's Me, Margaret. is a 2023 American coming-of-age comedy-drama film written and directed by Kelly Fremon Craig, based on the 1970 novel by Judy Blume. The film stars Abby Ryder Fortson, Rachel McAdams, Elle Graham, Benny Safdie, and Kathy Bates.

The film premiered at the San Francisco International Film Festival on April 23, 2023, and was released theatrically in the United States on April 28 by Lionsgate. It received mostly positive reviews and grossed $21 million worldwide against a $30 million budget.

== Plot ==
In 1970, 11-year-old Margaret Simon is informed by her parents Barbara and Herb that they are moving from New York City to a New Jersey suburb, as Herb has received a promotion. Upset about leaving her friends and paternal grandmother Sylvia, Margaret begins communicating with God about her concerns, anxieties, and hopes. Upon moving to New Jersey, Margaret is quickly befriended by her neighbor and soon-to-be classmate Nancy Wheeler. Nancy welcomes Margaret into her friend group with two other girls, Gretchen Potter and Janie Loomis.

As the school year begins, Margaret's teacher, Mr. Benedict, gives his class a year-long research assignment. After reading Margaret's answers to a class questionnaire, he asks Margaret why she dislikes religious holidays; she explains her family does not observe them. As her mother is a Christian and her father is Jewish, they feel Margaret should decide on her own religious identity when she becomes an adult. In response, Mr. Benedict suggests Margaret choose religion as her research assignment subject.

Prompted by her assignment, Margaret asks her mother why she has never met her maternal grandparents. Barbara reveals she is estranged from her devoutly Christian parents Paul and Mary, who disowned her for marrying a Jewish man.

During a weekend visit to New York, Margaret asks Sylvia to take her to temple, which Sylvia gladly does. Meanwhile, Barbara attempts to fit in with the PTA by signing up for multiple committees, which draw her away from her main interests—painting and teaching art.

Margaret and her new friends anticipate the milestones of puberty, including wearing a bra and having their first kisses. At a classmate's birthday party, Margaret shares her first kiss with Philip Leroy, a popular boy in her class, during two minutes in heaven. She also attends varied church services with Nancy and Janie.

After viewing a video on menstruation at school, the girls become excited about starting their periods. Margaret grows impatient when other girls get theirs before she does, including Gretchen and allegedly Nancy. One night while Margaret is dining in New York with the Wheelers, a distraught Nancy gets her period. Surprised at Nancy's tearful reaction, Margaret is upset to discover Nancy had lied about getting her period earlier.

At school, Margaret is assigned a group project with Laura Danker, a classmate ostracized by her peers (especially Nancy) for developing early. While working together in the library, Margaret jealously brings up rumors about Laura letting boys "feel her up". Upset, Laura storms out. Immediately regretting her words, Margaret follows Laura to a Catholic church where she sees her exit a confessional. Afterward, Margaret enters the confessional but is too nervous to tell the priest more than she "did something awful" before running out.

Margaret's spring break plans to visit Sylvia in Florida are thwarted when Barbara announces her parents are coming to meet Margaret. Learning of the cancelation, Sylvia arrives at the Simons' on the day of Paul and Mary's visit. After dinner, the evening becomes awkward when Paul and Mary question Margaret about attending Sunday school. Sylvia retorts that because Margaret accompanied her to temple in New York, her granddaughter had already chosen to become Jewish. This sparks an argument among the adults over what religion Margaret should follow. Margaret shouts at everyone to stop fighting, proclaiming she does not care about religion and does not believe in God.

Margaret hands in her research paper, which expresses her disillusionment with religion. Soon, she reconciles with her parents and Sylvia. At the end of the school year, Margaret thanks Mr. Benedict for being a good teacher. At the school carnival, she befriends Laura, asking her to dance, with Janie joining them shortly afterward. Barbara, who has since returned to teaching painting, tells Nancy's mother Jan, the PTA president, that she will no longer volunteer for committee work.

Before leaving for summer camp, Margaret talks to Moose Freed (a friend of Nancy's brother Evan), whom Margaret has been interested in throughout the year. They agree to spend time together when she returns. At home, she discovers her first period has arrived and excitedly tells her mother, who is thrilled for her. Margaret resumes her communication with God, thanking him.

== Cast ==
- Abby Ryder Fortson as Margaret Simon
- Rachel McAdams as Barbara Simon
- Kathy Bates as Sylvia Simon
- Benny Safdie as Herb Simon
- Elle Graham as Nancy Wheeler
- Amari Alexis Price as Janie Loomis
- Katherine Kupferer as Gretchen Potter
- Kate MacCluggage as Mrs. Jan Wheeler
- Aidan Wojtak-Hissong as Moose Freed
- Landon S. Baxter as Evan Wheeler
- Echo Kellum as Mr. Benedict
- Zackary Brooks as Philip Leroy
- Isol Young as Laura Danker
- Simms May as Norman Fisher
- Mia Dillon as Mary Hutchins
- Gary Houston as Paul Hutchins

== Production ==
After rejecting several offers to adapt her book in the 49 years since its publication, author Judy Blume sold the film rights to James L. Brooks and Kelly Fremon Craig, who worked together on The Edge of Seventeen (2016), with Craig set to write and direct. A studio bidding war over the distribution rights was won by Lionsgate.

In February 2021, it was announced that Abby Ryder Fortson would star as the titular Margaret, with Rachel McAdams cast as her mother. Kathy Bates was added to the cast in March. In April, Benny Safdie joined the cast.

Principal photography began on April 1, 2021, in Charlotte, North Carolina. Filming also took place in Concord, North Carolina late in May, and wrapped in June 2021. Hans Zimmer composed the film's score.

== Release ==
Are You There God? It's Me, Margaret. had its world premiere at the San Francisco International Film Festival on April 23, 2023, and was released on April 28, 2023, by Lionsgate Films. It was originally scheduled to be released on September 16, 2022.

The film was released on VOD on June 6, 2023, with a Blu-ray and DVD release that followed on July 11, 2023.

== Reception ==
=== Box office ===
Are You There God? It's Me, Margaret. grossed $20.4 million in the United States and Canada, and $1.1 million in other territories, for a worldwide total of $21.5 million.

In the United States and Canada, Are You There God? It's Me, Margaret. was released alongside Big George Foreman and Sisu, and was projected to gross $7–9 million from 3,334 theaters in its opening weekend. The film made $2.3 million on its first day, including $600,000 from early previews. It went on to debut to $6.8 million, finishing third behind holdovers The Super Mario Bros. Movie and Evil Dead Rise. In its second weekend the film made $3.2 million, finishing in fourth.

=== Critical response ===
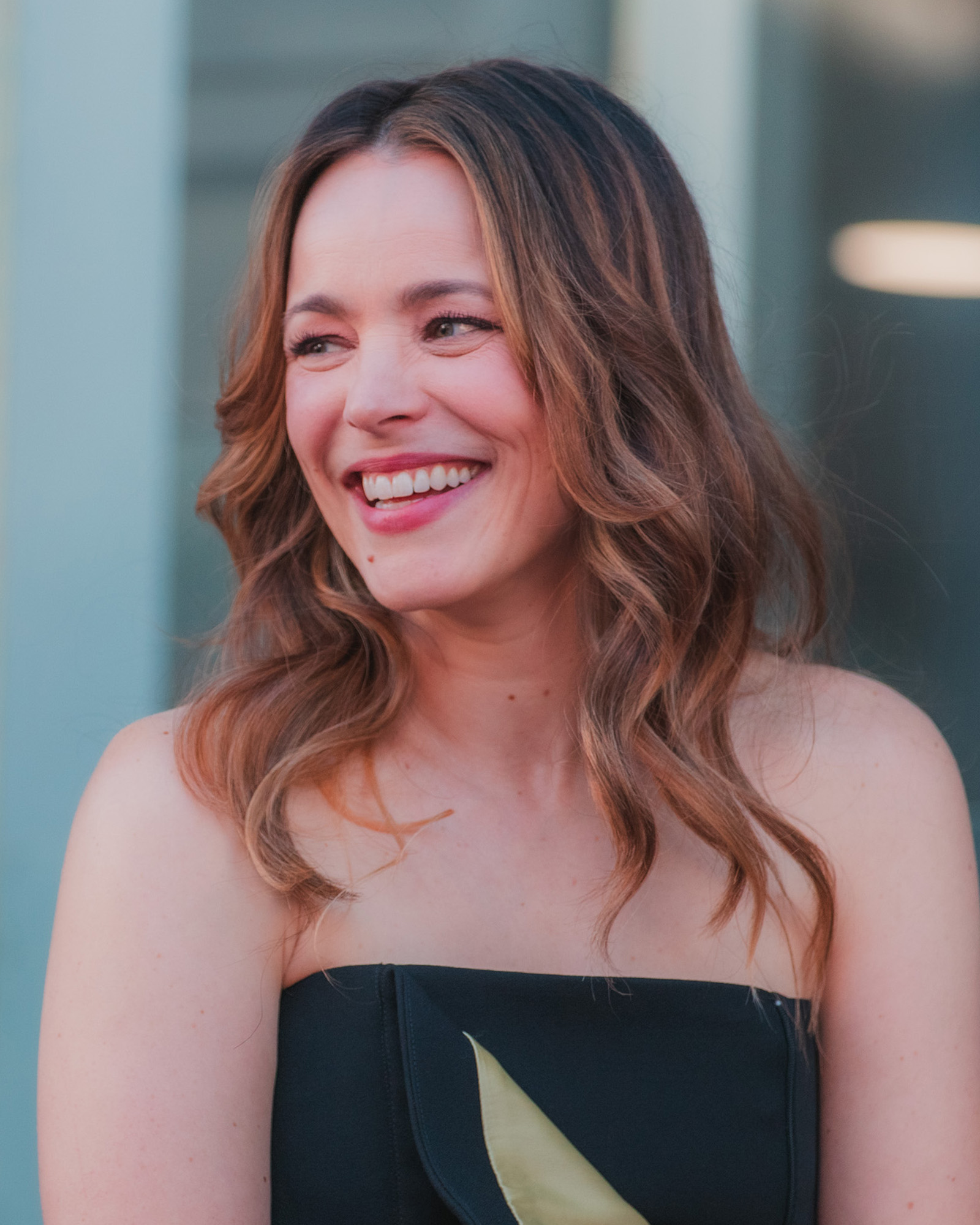
Rachel McAdams' performance garnered critical acclaim and she received several nominations and wins for it.

On the review aggregator website Rotten Tomatoes, 99% of 232 critics' reviews are positive, with an average rating of 8.4/10. The website's consensus reads: "Effervescent and refreshingly frank about the travails of puberty, this long-awaited adaptation does full justice to Judy Blume's seminal novel." Metacritic, which uses a weighted average, assigned the film a score of 84 out of 100, based on 49 critics, indicating "universal acclaim". Audiences surveyed by CinemaScore gave the film an average grade of "A" on an A+ to F scale, while those polled by PostTrak gave it an 88% positive score (with an average 4.5 out of 5 stars).

Critics praised the film for being a faithful adaptation of the book while also fleshing out its adult characters. Pete Hammond of Deadline Hollywood described the film as a "rip-roaring, funny, human, wonderful studio movie comedy you might have forgotten Hollywood knew how to make any more", and praised the film's cast, Craig's direction, and the decision to leave the story set in the 1970s, which was the setting of the novel. Hammond pointed out how "every character in this film is finding there is much to learn in life at whatever point you happen to be." Time called Fortson "marvelous" and said she "[captures] all of Margaret's eager earnestness". Amy Nicholson of Variety said "There’s plenty in [the film] to treasure" and "the [girls'] friendship scenes are standouts", but opined the film also "seems uneasy putting funny, flawed and all-too-realistic Margaret on screen exactly as she is."

=== Accolades ===
Award / Film Festival	Date of ceremony	Category	Recipient(s)	Result	Ref.
Heartland Film Festival	2023	Truly Moving Picture Award	Are You There God? It's Me, Margaret.	Won	
Hollywood Critics Association Midseason Film Awards	June 30, 2023	Best Picture	Are You There God? It's Me, Margaret.	Nominated	
Hollywood Critics Association Midseason Film Awards	June 30, 2023	Best Director	Kelly Fremon Craig	Nominated	
Hollywood Critics Association Midseason Film Awards	June 30, 2023	Best Screenplay	Kelly Fremon Craig	Nominated	
Hollywood Critics Association Midseason Film Awards	June 30, 2023	Best Actress	Abby Ryder Fortson	Runner-up	
Hollywood Critics Association Midseason Film Awards	June 30, 2023	Best Supporting Actress	Rachel McAdams	Runner-up	
Hollywood Critics Association Midseason Film Awards	June 30, 2023	Best Supporting Actress	Kathy Bates	Nominated	
Gotham Independent Film Awards	November 27, 2023	Outstanding Supporting Performance	Rachel McAdams	Nominated	
Chicago Film Critics Association Awards	December 12, 2023	Best Supporting Actress	Rachel McAdams	Nominated	
Chicago Film Critics Association Awards	December 12, 2023	Best Adapted Screenplay	Kelly Fremon Craig	Nominated	
Chicago Film Critics Association Awards	December 12, 2023	Most Promising Performer	Abby Ryder Fortson	Nominated	
Washington D.C. Area Film Critics Association Awards	December 10, 2023	Best Youth Performance	Abby Ryder Fortson	Nominated	
Los Angeles Film Critics Association	December 10, 2023	Best Supporting Performance	Rachel McAdams	Won	
Boston Society of Film Critics	December 10, 2023	Best Adapted Screenplay	Kelly Fremon Craig	Runner-up (Note: Shared with Eric Roth and Martin Scorsese for Killers of the Flower Moon.)	
Las Vegas Film Critics Society	December 13, 2023	Best Supporting Actress	Rachel McAdams	Nominated	
Las Vegas Film Critics Society	December 13, 2023	Best Adapted Screenplay	Kelly Fremon Craig	Nominated	
Las Vegas Film Critics Society	December 13, 2023	Best Family Film	Are You There God? It’s Me, Margaret.	Won	
Las Vegas Film Critics Society	December 13, 2023	Youth in Film (Female)	Abby Ryder Fortson	Won	
Las Vegas Film Critics Society	December 13, 2023	Youth in Film (Female)	Elle Graham	Nominated	
Indiana Film Journalists Association	December 17, 2023	Best Film	Are You There God? It’s Me, Margaret.	Nominated	
Indiana Film Journalists Association	December 17, 2023	Best Supporting Performance	Rachel McAdams	Nominated	
Indiana Film Journalists Association	December 17, 2023	Best Adapted Screenplay	Kelly Fremon Craig	Nominated	
Indiana Film Journalists Association	December 17, 2023	Best Ensemble Acting	Are You There God? It’s Me, Margaret.	Nominated	
St. Louis Film Critics Association	December 17, 2023	Best Supporting Actress	Rachel McAdams	Runner-up	
St. Louis Film Critics Association	December 17, 2023	Best Adapted Screenplay	Kelly Fremon Craig	Nominated	
St. Louis Film Critics Association	December 17, 2023	Best Comedy	Are You There God? It's Me, Margaret.	Nominated	
Phoenix Film Critics Society	December 18, 2023	Best Performance by a Youth	Abby Ryder-Fortson	Won	
North Texas Film Critics Association	December 18, 2023	Best Newcomer	Abby Ryder-Fortson	Nominated	
North Texas Film Critics Association	December 18, 2023	Best Supporting Actress	Rachel McAdams	Nominated	
Florida Film Critics Circle Awards	December 21, 2023	Best Supporting Actress	Rachel McAdams	Won	
Florida Film Critics Circle Awards	December 21, 2023	Best Adapted Screenplay	Kelly Fremon Craig	Nominated	
San Diego Film Critics Society	December 19, 2023	Best Picture	Are You There God? It's Me, Margaret.	Won	
San Diego Film Critics Society	December 19, 2023	Best Director	Kelly Fremon Craig	Nominated	
San Diego Film Critics Society	December 19, 2023	Best Actress	Abby Ryder Fortson	Nominated	
San Diego Film Critics Society	December 19, 2023	Best Supporting Actress	Rachel McAdams	Won	
San Diego Film Critics Society	December 19, 2023	Best Adapted Screenplay	Kelly Fremon Craig	Won	
San Diego Film Critics Society	December 19, 2023	Best Use of Music	Are You There God? It's Me, Margaret.	Nominated	
San Diego Film Critics Society	December 19, 2023	Best Comedic Performance	Abby Ryder Fortson	Nominated	
San Diego Film Critics Society	December 19, 2023	Best Youth Performance (For a performer under the age of 18)	Abby Ryder Fortson	Won	
San Diego Film Critics Society	December 19, 2023	Breakthrough Actor	Abby Ryder Fortson	Won	
Women Film Critics Circle	December 18, 2023	Best Woman Storyteller	Kelly Fremon Craig	Runner-up	
Alliance of Women Film Journalists	January 3, 2024	Best Woman's Breakthrough Performance	Abby Ryder Forston	Nominated	
Georgia Film Critics Association	January 5, 2024	Best Supporting Actress	Rachel McAdams	Nominated	
Georgia Film Critics Association	January 5, 2024	Best Adapted Screenplay	Kelly Fremon Craig	Nominated	
Georgia Film Critics Association	January 5, 2024	Breakthrough Award	Abby Ryder Forston	Nominated	
Astra Film and Creative Awards	January 6, 2024	Best Adapted Screenplay	Kelly Fremon Craig	Nominated	
Astra Film and Creative Awards	January 6, 2024	Best Comedy Feature	Are You There God? It's Me, Margaret.	Won	
Astra Film and Creative Awards	January 6, 2024	Best Supporting Actress	Rachel McAdams	Nominated	
Astra Film and Creative Awards	January 6, 2024	Star on the Rise Award	Abby Ryder Fortson	Won	
Seattle Film Critics Society	January 8, 2024	Best Supporting Actress	Rachel McAdams	Nominated	
Seattle Film Critics Society	January 8, 2024	Best Youth Performance	Abby Ryder Forston	Nominated	
San Francisco Bay Area Film Critics Circle	January 9, 2024	Best Supporting Actress	Rachel McAdams	Nominated	
Austin Film Critics Association	January 10, 2024	Best Supporting Actress	Rachel McAdams	Nominated	
Austin Film Critics Association	January 10, 2024	Best Adapted Screenplay	Kelly Fremon Craig	Nominated	
Austin Film Critics Association	January 10, 2024	The Robert R. "Bobby" McCurdy Memorial Breakthrough Artist Award	Abby Ryder Forston	Nominated	
Denver Film Critics Society	12 January 2024	Best Supporting Performance by an Actor, Female	Rachel McAdams	Nominated	
Critics' Choice Awards	January 14, 2024	Best Adapted Screenplay	Kelly Fremon Craig	Nominated	
Critics' Choice Awards	January 14, 2024	Best Young Actor/Actress	Abby Ryder Fortson	Nominated	
Houston Film Critics Society	January 22, 2024	Best Picture	Are You There God? It's Me, Margaret.	Nominated	
Houston Film Critics Society	January 22, 2024	Best Supporting Actress	Rachel McAdams	Nominated	
Kansas City Film Critics Circle	January 27, 2024	Best Supporting Actress	Rachel McAdams	Runner-up	
Kansas City Film Critics Circle	January 27, 2024	Best Adapted Screenplay	Kelly Fremon Craig	Won	
Minnesota Film Critics Alliance	February 4, 2024	Best Supporting Actress	Rachel McAdams	Runner-up	
Set Decorators Society of America Awards	February 13, 2024	Best Achievement in Décor/Design of a Comedy or Musical Feature Film	Selina M. Van den Brink and Steve Saklad	Nominated	
People's Choice Awards	February 18, 2024	The Comedy Movie of the Year	Are You There God? It's Me, Margaret.	Nominated	
Dorian Awards	February 26, 2024	Best Supporting Film Performance of the Year	Rachel McAdams	Nominated	
Dorian Awards	February 26, 2024	Unsung Film of the Year	Are You There God? It's Me, Margaret.	Won	
Artios Awards	March 7, 2024	Outstanding Achievement in Casting – Big Budget Feature (Comedy)	Francine Maisler, Melissa Kostenbauder, Betsy Fippinger, Tara Feldstein, Chase Paris, Molly Rose	Won	
Writers Guild of America Awards	April 14, 2024	Best Adapted Screenplay	Kelly Fremon Craig	Nominated	
