= Rogue Ales =

Beer brewery in Ashland, Oregon, US

Coordinates: 44.6202°N 124.05236°W

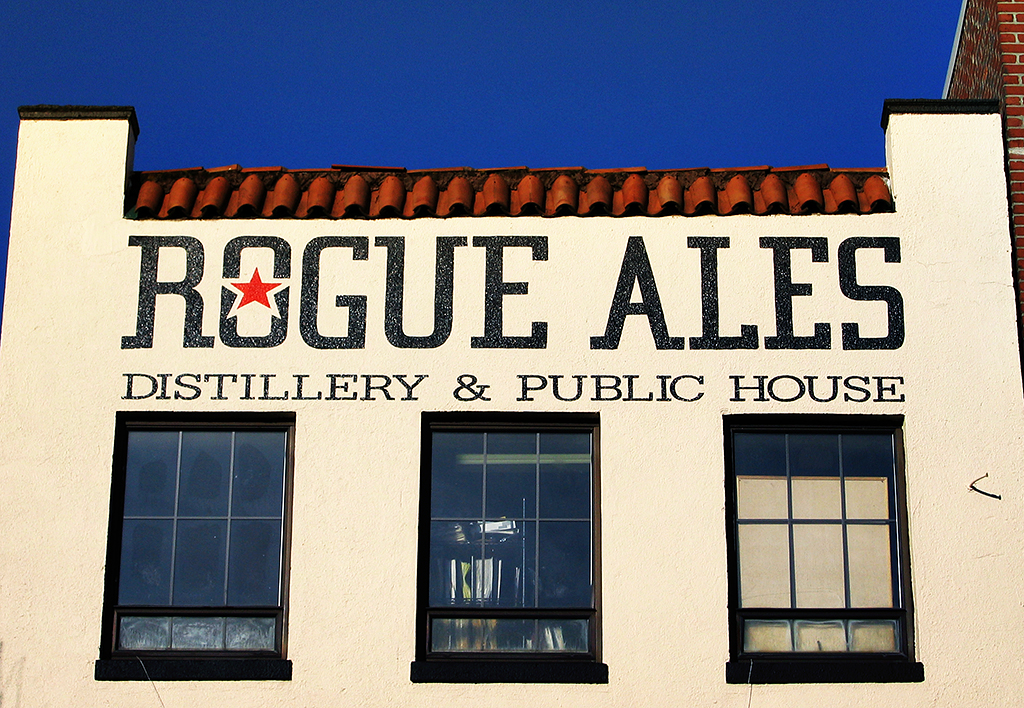
- Rogue Ales Distillery & Public House, Portland, Oregon, USA
- Industry: Alcoholic beverage
- Founded: 1988
- Founder: Jack Joyce; Rob Strasser; Bob Woodell
- Defunct: November 14, 2025; 10 months ago
- Headquarters: Newport, Oregon, U.S.
- Area served: U.S. and international
- Key people: Steven Garrett (president)
- Products: Beer; Spirits; Cider; Soda
- Website: rogue.com

Rogue Ales was a brewery founded in 1988 in Ashland, Oregon that is no longer in operation in bankruptcy proceedings. Rogue had operated a handful of pub locations around Oregon under the parent company Oregon Brewing Company. All operations ceased in November 2025 with the company filing bankruptcy later the same month and brewery assets auctioned in March 2026

== History ==
Rogue Ales was founded in Ashland, Oregon in 1988 by three Nike, Inc. executives: Jack Joyce, Rob Strasser, and Bob Woodell.

In 1987, Jack Joyce, Bob Woodell, past University of Oregon fraternity brothers, and another friend, Rob Strasser, were approached by Jeff Schultz, Woodell's accountant and avid home brewer, with an idea to open a brewpub.

Construction began in June 1988 in Ashland, along the Lithia Creek. The 10 bbl brew system was set up in the basement with a 60-seat Pub above. The first brews were American Amber Ale, Oregon Golden Ale and Shakespeare Stout. The Brewery and Pub opened in October 1988 to moderate success and soon, the company started looking to expand.

In February 1989, construction began on the Bay Front Brew Pub in Newport, Oregon. In March, John Maier, a former Hughes Aircraft employee and Seibel Institute graduate, joined the company. Mair was previously a brewer at Alaskan Brewing before he was recruited by Joyce. The pub opened in May 1989. By 2018, Rogue had eleven locations dispersed throughout Oregon, Washington, and California.

Rogue has sponsored the annual surfing event "The Gathering Longboard Classic" on Newport's South Beach.

At the end of 2018 Brett Joyce, (Jack Joyce's son) stepped down as company president and was replaced by general manager Dharma Tamm. Joyce retains an ownership stake and remains on the board.

In August 2023, Steven Garrett became the president, replacing Tamm.

On November 14th, 2025, Rogue Ales abruptly halted all operations in Newport, Oregon with no explanation. It had filed for Chapter 7 bankruptcy on November 25, 2025 leaving behind over $16.7 million in unpaid debt. The bankruptcy includes the subsidiary companies Rogue River Brewing Co. and Yaquina Bay Beverage Co. Assets from the brewery were auctioned in March 2026.

== Brewing ==
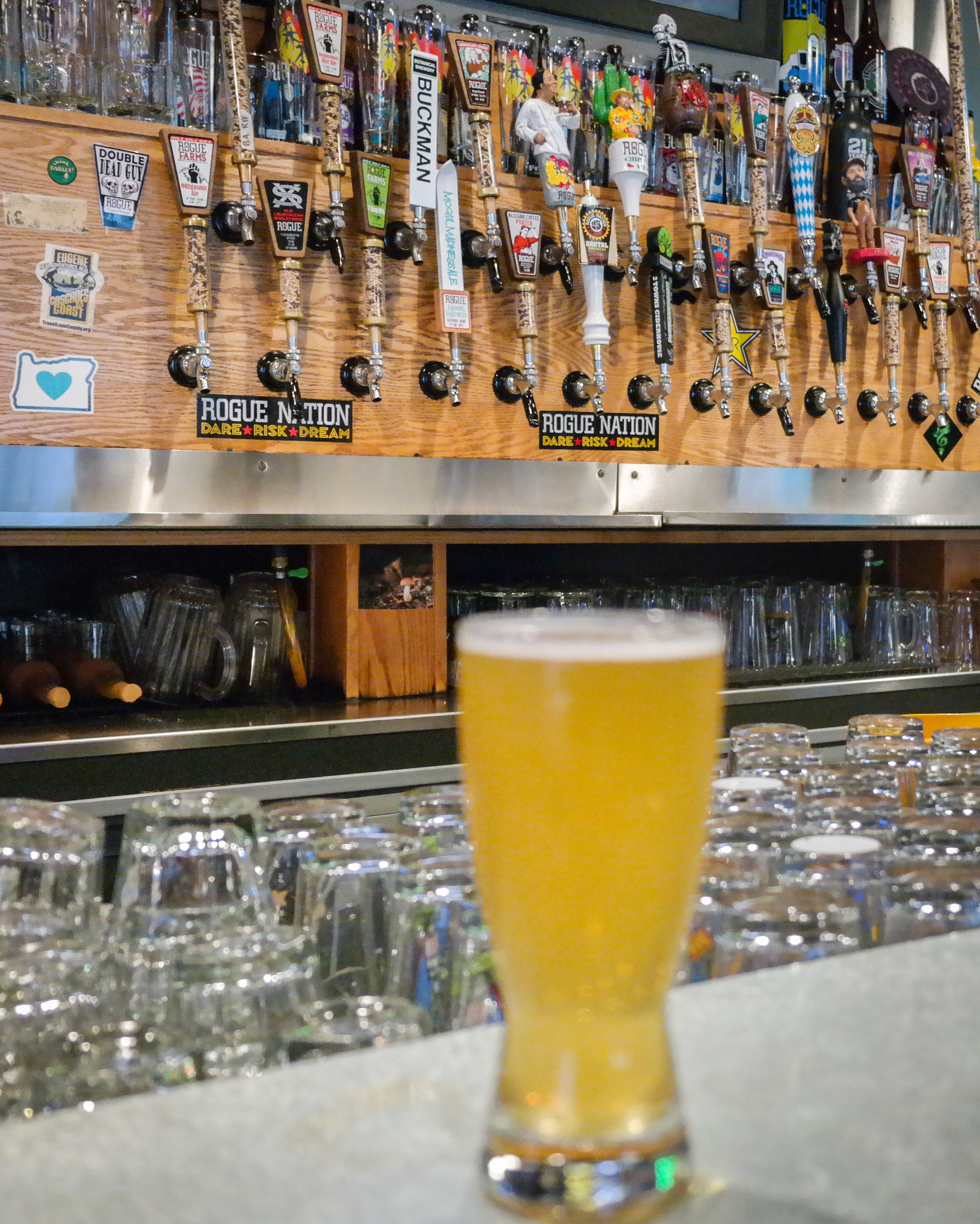
Single malt, American ale at Rogue Ales in Eugene, Oregon

Brewmaster John C. Maier joined the company in 1989 from Alaskan Brewing. Rogue has produced more than 60 different ales. The company uses a proprietary yeast known as "Pacman".

Maier says that all of their beers are meant to go with food, and the company has worked with chefs, brewing industry experts, and restaurateurs.

Maier stepped down as brewmaster in July 2019, and was replaced by Joel Shields.

=== Notable brews ===
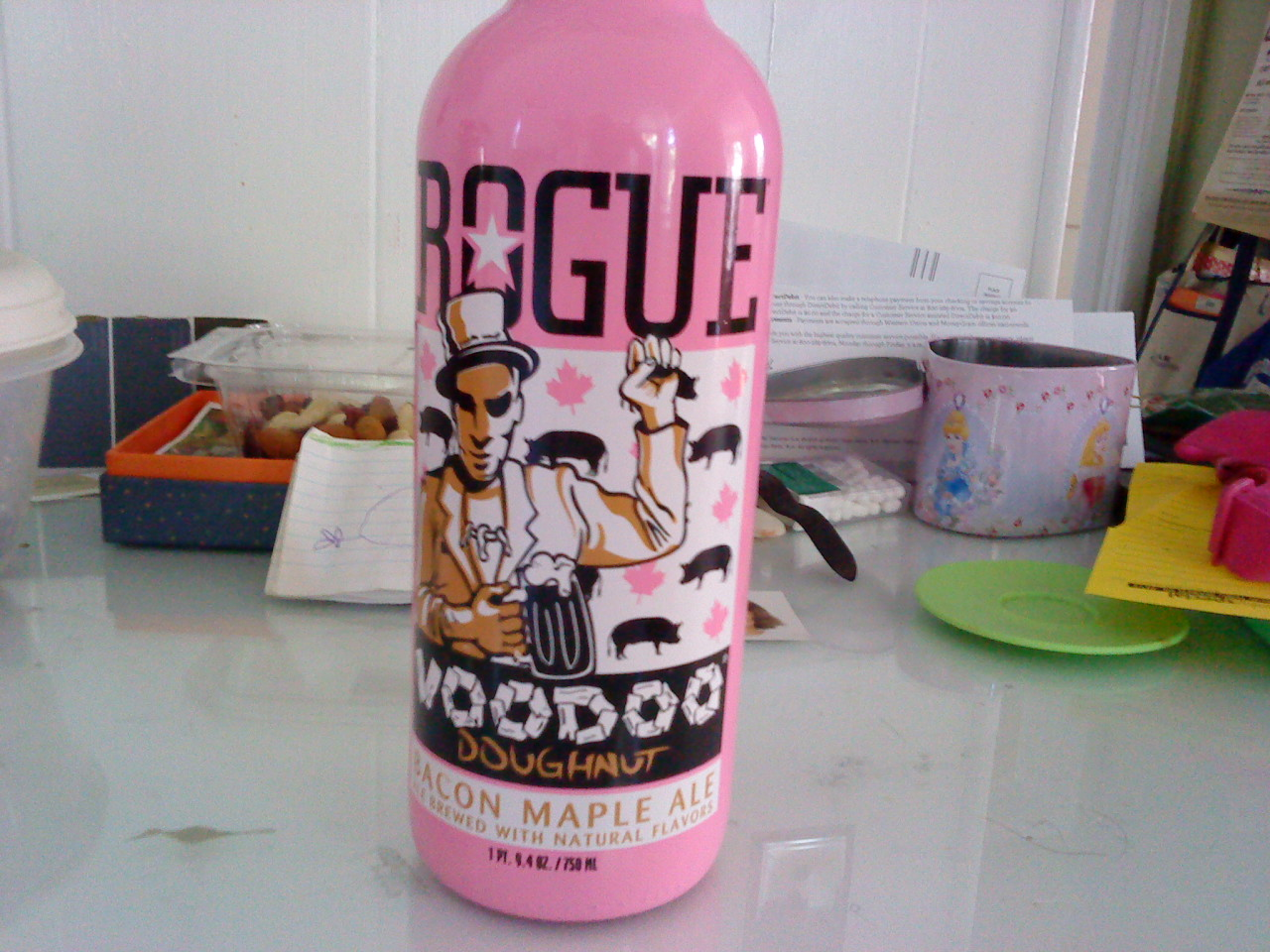
Collaboration between Rogue Ales and Voodoo Doughnuts

Rogue has collaborated on brewing beers with Rogue Creamery, Portland State, Voodoo Doughnut, Dark Horse Comics, and others. The brewery released Hot Sriracha Stout in 2013, made with the sauce of the same name.

The brewery once created a beer using a strain of yeast found in Brewmaster Maier's beard, known as their Beard Beer.

Rogue has entered contests held by the Brewers Association multiple times, and has received several medals. Rogue has entered both the Great American Beer Festival (GABF) and the World Beer Cup (WBC).

== Labor issues ==
In 2011, a group of employees from the Rogue Brewery in Newport, Oregon were unsuccessful in their attempt to unionize. Rogue was accused at the time for union-busting tactics at their Newport brewery, and has been questioned for their salary standards.

Rogue's Eugene Public House and Track Town Brewery was shut down in 2014. According to Northwest Brewing News, this was at least in part also due to Rogue's "cheapskate management tactics". Rogue reportedly refused to let the brewers have an assistant, and some brewers were forced to carry heavy loads and spend their own money to work within the company's dollar-per-keg budget limits.

In July 2015, company president Brett Joyce dismissed those with complaints as having "an ax to grind".
