= Peter Moore (shoe designer) =

American shoe designer and artist (1944–2022)

- Born: February 21, 1944; Cleveland, Ohio, U.S.
- Died: April 29, 2022 (aged 78); Portland, Oregon, U.S.
- Education: Chouinard Art Institute
- Known for: Designing the Air Jordan 1 silhouette, Nike Dunk silhouette, Air Jordan logo, Jumpman logo, and Adidas logo.
- Spouse: Christina Hummel
- Children: 3 sons Devin, Dylan, Hagen

Peter Moore (February 21, 1944 – April 29, 2022) was an American designer and artist who was a creative director at Nike and Adidas from the 1970s to the late 1990s. Moore is credited as the creator of the Air Jordan 1 silhouette and Nike Dunk silhouette. As a multidisciplinary designer, Moore also created logos for the sneaker brands including the Air Jordan ball-and-wings logo, the Jumpman logo, and the Adidas mountain logo.

== Early life ==
Moore was born on February 21, 1944, in Cleveland, Ohio, to Raymond (a career Navy officer) and Mary (Jameson) Moore. He attended Chouinard, now California Institute of the Arts, where he studied art and then graphic design, graduating in 1969. He then moved to Portland in 1972.

== Career ==
Moore worked as Creative Director for wood products company Georgia Pacific in 1972. He started Peter Moore Graphic Design in 1973 and began working with Nike in 1977. He then left Nike in 1987 to start Sports Incorporated with Rob Strasser, and eventually established Adidas America in 1992. Following the unexpected death of Rob Strasser in 1993, Moore served as Adidas' chief executive officer for a short period. In 1998, Moore left Adidas to focus on printmaking only to return again as a brand consultant for Adidas in 2013. He died on April 29, 2022 in Portland, Oregon; he was 78.

Moore was also an artist, mostly printmaking and watercolor paintings focused on global politics, injustice, the environment, and calling for Peace. His annual Christmas posters always featured a dove in some form. His personal artwork is featured on the website petermoorecreated.com.

== Popular culture ==
Matthew Maher portrayed Moore in the 2023 movie Air.

Moore is the subject of the book Peter Moore Sneaker Legend by Jason Coles.
