= Matthew Maher (actor) =

American actor

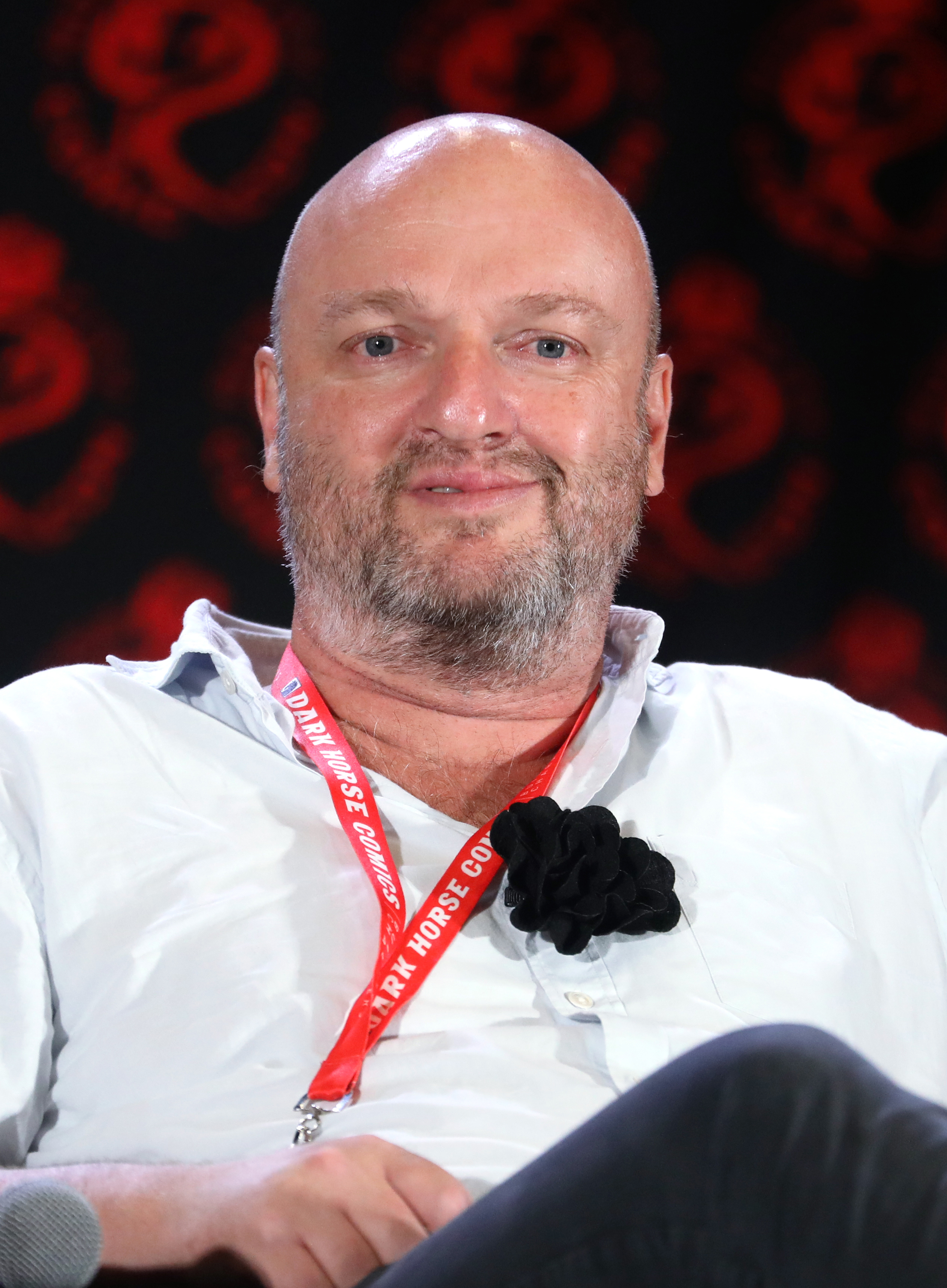
- Maher in 2024
- Born: 1971 or 1972 (age 54–55); Arkabutla, Mississippi, U.S.
- Occupation: Actor
- Years active: 1999–present

Matthew Maher (born 1971 or 1972) is an American actor. He is best known for his roles in Bringing Out the Dead (1999), Dogma (1999), Jersey Girl (2004), Gone Baby Gone (2007), It's Kind of a Funny Story (2010), Grand Theft Auto V (2013), Captain Marvel (2019), Funny Pages (2022), Air (2023), Our Flag Means Death (2022–2023), and Primetime (2026).

== Career ==
Maher has an extensive theatrical career having performed at The Public Theater, New York Shakespeare Festival, Berkeley Rep, and Actors Theater of Louisville. Theater credits include Red-Handed Otter at Cherry Lane Theater, Uncle Vanya at Soho Repertory Theatre, Golden Child by David Henry Hwang at Signature Theatre Company, and Tales From My Parents Divorce by The Civilians.

He has appeared occasionally in feature films, including Bringing Out the Dead (1999), Dogma (1999), Vulgar (2000), The Third Wheel (2002), Jersey Girl (2004), Gone Baby Gone (2007), The Killer Inside Me, I'm Still Here and It's Kind of a Funny Story (2010), Captain Marvel (2019), Funny Pages (2022), and Air (2023).

He starred in the 2013 premiere of Annie Baker's The Flick at Playwrights Horizons; Baker subsequently won the 2014 Pulitzer Prize for Drama. He was also in the 2015 production at the Barrow Street Theatre and the 2016 production at the National Theatre Dorfman in London.

== Filmography ==
Key
†	Denotes films that have not yet been released

=== Film ===
Year	Title	Role	Note
1999	Dogma	Bartender	
1999	Bringing Out the Dead	Mr. Oh's Friend	
2000	Four Letter Words	Jordon	
2000	Vulgar	Gino Fanelli	
2002	The Third Wheel	Hank	
2002	Big Apple	Office Worker #2	
2003	Just Another Story		
2004	Jersey Girl	Delivery Guy	
2004	Pagans	Store Clerk	
2005	Homecoming	Frank	
2007	Gone Baby Gone	Corwin Earle	
2008	Uber Alice	Jeremy	Short film
2009	Finding Graceland	Ricky	Short film
2010	The Killer Inside Me	Deputy Jeff Plummer	
2010	The Face	Bocce Ball Player	Short film
2010	I'm Still Here	Matt	
2010	It's Kind of a Funny Story	Humble	
2011	Sweet Little Lies		
2013	Frank the Bastard	Worm	
2014	While We're Young	Tim	
2014	A Most Violent Year	John Dominczyk	
2015	People Places Things	Improv Partner	
2016	The Finest Hours	Carl Nickerson	
2016	My Entire High School Sinking Into the Sea	Senior Kyle (voice)	
2016	The Surf Report	Bartender	Short film
2016	Live by Night	RD Pruitt	
2017	The Incredible Jessica James	Actor	
2017	Cat Killer	Tyler Krallman from Applebees	Short film
2017	Lady Bird	NYC Man on Street	
2017	Testosterone: Volume One	Bartender	
2019	Captain Marvel	Norex	
2019	Marriage Story	Theater Actor	
2020	The Mimic	The Waiter/Bartender	
2020	The Outside Story	Neil	
2022	Funny Pages	Wallace	
2023	Air	Peter Moore	
2023	The Kill Room	Nate	
2024	Relay	Hoffman	
2025	The Mastermind	Jerry	
2025	On the End	Milton	
2026	The Bride!	James	
2026	Primetime	Xavier Von Erck	

=== Television ===
Year	Title	Role	Notes
2001	Clerks	Additional voices	2 episodes
2004	The Jury	Tim Winslow	Episode: "Too Jung to Die"
2004	Law & Order: Criminal Intent	Bo	Episode: "In the Dark"
2006	Law & Order: Special Victims Unit	Tim	Episode: "Manipulated"
2007	John From Cincinnati	Dwayne	Recurring
2008	Law & Order	Antonio	Episode: "Tango"
2009	The Unusuals	Marvin Bechamel	2 episodes
2010	Bored to Death	Hostel Concierge	Episode: "Super Ray Is Mortal!"
2013	Over/Under	Danny	TV movie
2014	100 Monologues	Recovering Male	Episode: "The Recovering Male"
2015	Nurse Jackie	Matt	3 episodes
2018	Mozart in the Jungle	Alan Lawford	Recurring (season 4)
2018	Elementary	Hugo Irving	Episode: "Nobody Lives Forever"
2018	New Amsterdam	Barry / Ray DeMarco	Episode: "Every Last Minute"
2022–2023	Our Flag Means Death	Black Pete	Main (18 episodes)
2022–2024	Outer Range	Deputy Matt	6 episodes
2023	Hello Tomorrow!	Lester Costopoulos	Reoccurring (8 episodes)
2024	American Horror Stories	Eli	Episode: "Backrooms"
2025	Elsbeth	Julian Simons	Episode: "Glamazons"
2026	Wylde Pak	Vault Whiznee (voice)	Episode: "The Real Woori World/The Collector"

=== Video games ===
Year	Title	Role
2013	Grand Theft Auto V	Wade Hebert
2026	Grand Theft Auto VI	Wade Hebert

== Theater (partial) ==
- Richard III (2004, The Public Theater) as Christopher/2nd Murderer
- The School for Lies (2011, Classic Stage Company) as Acaste
- Golden Child (2012, Signature Theatre) as Reverend Baines
- Mr. Burns, a Post-Electric Play (2013, Playwrights Horizons) as Matt
- The Flick (2013, Playwrights Horizons; 2015, Barrow Street Theatre; 2016, National Theatre) as Sam
- Othello (2016, New York Theatre Workshop) as Roderigo
- King Lear (2019, Cort Theatre) as Oswald

== Awards and nominations ==
Year	Award	Category	Nominee(s)	Result	Ref.
1999	Obie Awards	Performance	The Race of the Ark Tattoo	Won	
2013	Obie Awards	Sustained Excellence in Performance		Won	
2022	Peabody Awards	Entertainment	Our Flag Means Death	Nominated	
2023	Chlotrudis Awards	Best Supporting Actor	Funny Pages	Nominated	
