= Paul Brodeur =

American novelist (1931–2023)

- Born: May 16, 1931; Boston, Massachusetts, U.S.
- Died: August 2, 2023 (aged 92); Hyannis, Massachusetts, U.S.
- Education: Phillips Academy; Harvard College
- Occupations: Writer, novelist
- Children: Adrienne Brodeur
- Writing career
- Genres: Fiction, science

Paul Adrian Brodeur Jr. (May 16, 1931 – August 2, 2023) was an American investigative science writer and author, whose writings have appeared in The New Yorker, where he began as a staff writer in 1958. He lived on Cape Cod. For nearly two decades he researched and wrote about the health hazards of asbestos. He also wrote about the dangers of household detergents, the depletion of the ozone layer, microwave radiation and electromagnetic fields from power lines.

== Early life and education ==
Paul Brodeur born in Boston on May 16, 1931. He was raised in Arlington, Massachusetts. His mother was a teacher and his father was an orthodontist and sculptor.

He graduated from Phillips Academy in 1949 and Harvard College in 1953.

== Career ==
After college, Brodeur served in the Army Counter Intelligence Corps in West Germany. He then lived for a year in Paris. While he was in Paris, he wrote the short story The Sick Fox, which become his first piece for The New Yorker when it was published in 1957. In 1958, he joined the staff of The New Yorker, first writing for the Talk of the Town and Comment sections and writing occasional short stories. In 1962, he adapted The Sick Fox into a novel. In 1970, he published The Stunt Man, a novel about an Army deserter who evades capture by working as a movie stunt man. In 1980, it was adapted into the Oscar-nominated film The Stunt Man with Peter O’Toole as an egotistical movie director.

In 1968, he wrote his first long article for the magazine called “The Magic Mineral,” which detailed the history of asbestos, which could be found in thousands of products at the time, and its link to cancer among those that worked with the material, which caused many to die of mesothelioma. Asbestos had been linked to disease in the early 20th century, but his article brought the issue national attention and lead to asbestos activism and regulations. He reported on the subject for more than 15 years. He wrote about its use in the insulation of buildings, the grave dangers it posed even as dust on people's clothes, and how industry officials tried to keep asbestos on the market.

In 1974, he won a National Magazine Award for his five-part series on the closure and cleanup of a Pittsburgh Corning asbestos plant in Tyler, Texas, where around 875 workers were exposed to asbestos and about 260 were expected to develop cancer.

He also wrote two early influential articles in 1975 and 1986 on the dangers of chlorofluorocarbons to the ozone layer.

In 1992, he donated 300 boxes of papers accumulated during his research to the New York Public Library. In 2010 he was informed that the NYPL had finished culling the papers it chose to retain in its collection. Brodeur publicly objected, stating that the materials to be removed were essential to understanding his investigative process. Brodeur's papers are now archived at the Howard Gotlieb Archival Research Center at Boston University.

Science writer Gary Taubes has said Brodeur's writings on electromagnetic radiation are part of what inspired him to switch from writing about bad practices in physics to epidemiology and public health.

Brodeur's short stories have appeared in The New Yorker, The Saturday Evening Post, and Show Magazine.

He retired in the mid-1990s, after the take over of the New Yorker by Tina Brown. In retirement, he lived in a modernist house filled with art on the northern tip of Cape Cod and regularly went fishing.

== Personal life and death ==
His daughter, Adrienne Brodeur, is an author and program director at the Aspen Institute.

Paul Brodeur died in Hyannis, Massachusetts on August 2, 2023, at the age of 92, following complications from pneumonia and hip replacement surgery.

== Bibliography ==
- The Sick Fox (novel) – 1963
- The Stunt Man (novel) – 1970
- Downstream (short stories) – 1972
- "Asbestos & Enzymes" – 1972
- "Expendable Americans" – 1974
- "The Zapping of America: Microwaves, Their Deadly Risk, and the Coverup" – 1977
- "The Asbestos Hazard" – 1980
- "Outrageous Misconduct: the Asbestos Industry on Trial" – 1985
- "Restitution: The Land Claims of the Mashpee, Passamaquoddy, and Penobscot Indians of New England" – 1985
- "Currents of Death" – 1989
- "The Great Power-Line Cover-Up: How the Utilities and Government Are Trying to Hide the Cancer Hazard Posed by Electromagnetic Fields" – 1993
- "Secrets: A Writer in the Cold War" – 1997
