= Wild Game =

2019 memoir by Adrienne Brodeur

- First edition
- Author: Adrienne Brodeur
- Language: English
- Genre: Memoir
- Publisher: Mariner Books (US); Chatto & Windus (UK)
- Publication date: October 15, 2019
- Publication place: United States
- Media type: Print (hardcover)
- Pages: 234
- ISBN: 978-0-358-36132-9

Wild Game: My Mother, Her Lover, and Me is a 2019 memoir by American writer Adrienne Brodeur. It recounts the author's collision with her mother, Malabar Brewster, to conceal an affair Brewster was having while Brodeur was a teenager.

== Plot ==
In Wild Game, Brodeur recounts how Brodeur helped her mother conceal her affair beginning in 1980 when Brodeur was 14. Brodeur's mother Malabar Brewster was a food writer for The Boston Globe, and the book's title comes from the name of an unproduced cookbook Brewster planned to write with her husband, Charles, her lover, Ben Southern, a hunter, and Ben's wife, Lily.

Though Brodeur used her parents' real names, she changed the names of other parties featured in the story.

Brodeur stated that her mother supported her efforts to have the book written. However, by the time it was completed, Brewster's dementia had worsened to the point she could not read the book.

== Reception ==
Wild Game was named a national bestseller. It won the New England Society of New York 2020 Book Award in the nonfiction category and was ranked by People as one of the 10 best books of 2019. Amazon also ranked Wild Game as a best book of 2019.

The book received positive reviews from critics. In her The New York Times review, Rapp Black wrote, "The book is so gorgeously written and deeply insightful, and with a line of narrative tension that never slacks, from the first page to the last, that it’s one you’ll likely read in a single, delicious sitting." She also praised the way Brodeur "does not reject her mother, [...] but neither does she become her or soft-pedal the ways in which Malabar continues to wound her."

Jennifer Haupt of Psychology Today wrote that the book is "inspiring" and "moving, masterful." In a review published in The Guardian, Elizabeth Lowry called the book, "Polished but very dark [...] A memoir of sex, animal innards and a daughter who is too polite to her narcissist mother."

Publishers Weekly, which deemed it a featured book, wrote that it is "page-turning" and "This layered narrative of deceit, denial, and disillusionment is a surefire bestseller." Ilana Masad of National Public Radio stated that the novel, "for all its luscious prose and tantalizing elements, is ultimately about the slow and painful process of losing a mother." Masad wrote that the work "reads very much like a novel with a first-person narrator."

== Film adaptation ==
In 2018 it was announced that Kelly Fremon Craig would be adapting the book into a film for Chernin Entertainment.
