= Air (2023 American film) =

2023 film by Ben Affleck

- Theatrical release poster
- Directed by: Ben Affleck
- Written by: Alex Convery
- Produced by: David Ellison; Jesse Sisgold; Jon Weinbach; Ben Affleck; Matt Damon; Madison Ainley; Jeff Robinov; Peter Guber; Jason Michael Berman
- Starring: Matt Damon; Ben Affleck; Jason Bateman; Chris Messina; Matthew Maher; Marlon Wayans; Jay Mohr; Julius Tennon; Chris Tucker; Viola Davis
- Cinematography: Robert Richardson
- Edited by: William Goldenberg
- Production companies: Skydance Sports; Artists Equity; Mandalay Pictures
- Distributed by: Amazon Studios (United States); Warner Bros. Pictures (International)
- Release dates: March 18, 2023 (SXSW); April 5, 2023 (United States)
- Running time: 112 minutes
- Country: United States
- Language: English
- Budget: $70–90 million
- Box office: $90.1 million

Air is a 2023 American biographical sports comedy-drama film directed by Ben Affleck and written by Alex Convery. It is based on true events about the origin of Air Jordan, a basketball shoeline, of which a Nike employee seeks to strike a business deal with rookie player Michael Jordan. The film stars Matt Damon, Affleck, Jason Bateman, Chris Messina, Matthew Maher, Marlon Wayans, Jay Mohr, Julius Tennon, Chris Tucker, and Viola Davis.

The project was announced in April 2022 with Affleck set to direct, as well as star and produce alongside Damon with their newly formed production company Artists Equity. Principal photography took place between June and July 2022 with Affleck reuniting with his frequent collaborators cinematographer Robert Richardson and editor William Goldenberg. Though Jordan was uninvolved with the production, he did meet with Affleck, offering several suggestions, including the casting of Davis as his mother. Originally set to premiere on the streaming service Amazon Prime Video, distributor Amazon Studios opted to release the film theatrically first after positive test screenings, making it the first Amazon title since Late Night (2019) to be released in theaters without also premiering on Prime Video.

Air had its world premiere at South by Southwest on March 18, 2023, and was released theatrically in the United States on April 5. The film received positive reviews from critics and grossed $90 million worldwide. It received two nominations at the 81st Golden Globe Awards, including Best Motion Picture – Musical or Comedy.

== Plot ==
In 1984, Oregon-based Nike, Inc. is on the verge of shutting its basketball shoe division down due to low sales. In response to this, Marketing VP Rob Strasser, along with co-founder and CEO Phil Knight, task Nike's basketball talent scout Sonny Vaccaro to come up with a new spokesperson for Nike basketball shoes.

While considering the basketball players chosen in the 1984 NBA draft, Nike's executives think third pick Michael Jordan is off limits, being both a fan of Adidas and too expensive for the basketball division's meager budget. However, once Vaccaro watches Jordan's highlights in conjunction with an Arthur Ashe commercial for his Head rackets, Vaccaro becomes convinced that Nike should pursue who he considers a generational talent, with both brand and athlete building off each other.

Following dinner with his friend George Raveling, who coached Jordan in the Olympic tournament, and asking for his support in courting the star, Vaccaro travels to Wilmington, North Carolina, where he convinces Michael's mother Deloris that Nike would give Jordan all the attention that he would not receive from his preferred brands Adidas and Converse.

After receiving a negative phone call from Jordan's agent David Falk regarding contacting his client's family, Vaccaro learns that the Jordans have scheduled a meeting at Nike's Beaverton, Oregon headquarters the following Monday. Vaccaro and Strasser start preparing their pitch while requesting shoe designer Peter Moore to prepare a prototype, which Moore names "Air Jordan" after Nike's Air Sole technology. In the meantime, Knight agrees to assign the basketball division's entire $250,000 budget to sign Jordan.

After the meeting with Jordan and his parents is successful, Vaccaro learns that Adidas matched the offer while adding a Mercedes Benz 380SL, and he thinks the deal will not go through. However, Vaccaro receives a call from Deloris, who states that Michael will sign with Nike on the condition he earns a percentage of every Air Jordan sold.

Even though Vaccaro thinks the company's higher-ups would not accept this bonus due to industry precedent, Knight goes with it, deeming necessary to ensure the endorsement. An epilogue reveals the Air Jordan exceeded Knight's expectations of $3 million in sales, earning $162 million in one year and becoming a steady source of income for Nike.

== Cast ==
- Matt Damon as Sonny Vaccaro
- Ben Affleck as Phil Knight
- Jason Bateman as Rob Strasser
- Chris Messina as David Falk
- Matthew Maher as Peter Moore
- Marlon Wayans as George Raveling
- Jay Mohr as John Fisher
- Julius Tennon as James Jordan
- Chris Tucker as Howard White
- Viola Davis as Deloris Jordan
- Dan Bucatinsky as Richard
- Gustaf Skarsgård as Horst Dassler
- Jessica Green as Katrina Sainz

== Production ==
=== Development ===
The screenplay was written by Alex Convery between 2020 and 2021, appearing on 2021's Black List under the title Air Jordan. Convery had the idea for the film while watching a brief segment in the documentary miniseries The Last Dance about how Nike signed basketball player Michael Jordan and created the Air Jordan. He then researched the history further. It was reported in April 2022 that the script had been bought by Amazon Studios, who were to produce with Skydance Sports and Mandalay Pictures, with Ben Affleck and Matt Damon teaming to star in the film, while Affleck would direct.

=== Filming ===
Principal photography began in Los Angeles on June 6, 2022, with Jason Bateman, Viola Davis, Chris Tucker, Marlon Wayans, and Chris Messina amongst several additions to the cast. Robert Richardson served as cinematographer, using the Arri Alexa 35 camera to film with. It wrapped up in July 2022. The same month, Joel Gretsch, Gustaf Skarsgård, and Jessica Green were announced to be among the cast. The character of Michael Jordan is portrayed in the film, though his face is not seen and has limited dialogue.

Although not directly involved with the film, Jordan met with Affleck prior to the beginning of production and gave the project his blessing, asking for four changes to the script. Jordan asked for the inclusion of George Raveling, his assistant coach on the 1984 United States men's Olympic basketball team, who was the first to recommend that he should sign with Nike. Jordan also asked that Howard White, vice president of Nike's Jordan Brand and his personal friend, be included in the film. This directly led to Affleck casting Tucker, with whom he had long wanted to work and whom Jordan knew. He also asked for the removal of Tinker Hatfield as a character, as Hatfield, despite working at Nike at the time, was not involved with the creation of the Air Jordan. Finally, Jordan asked the roles of his parents, James R. Jordan Sr. and Deloris Jordan, to be extended, and the casting of Davis to play his mother, who was instrumental in making his mind about meeting and signing a deal with Nike, was his idea. Affleck and Damon did an uncredited script revision to accommodate Jordan's asks.

== Music ==
Affleck curated a playlist titled 1984 on Spotify, having more than a hundred popular hits from the 1980s. He sent the playlist to music supervisor Andrea von Foerster, and instructed her to select the tracks that are apt for the film. Since she did not have a big-budget for the film's music, she asked artists and music publishers to trust the film's story and compile the soundtrack. The soundtrack to the film featured 13 songs out of the 23 needle drops and 18 score cues as heard in the film, and released under the Legacy Recordings label on April 5, 2023.

== Release ==
Air was originally slated for a streaming-only release on Amazon Prime Video, but Amazon Studios eventually decided to release the film theatrically following strong results from test screenings.

Air was theatrically released in the United States on April 5, 2023, making it the first Amazon title since Late Night (2019) to be given an exclusive theatrical release. Warner Bros. Pictures handled the film's international theatrical and worldwide physical home media release. Amazon also gave the film a longer theatrical window before releasing it on Prime Video globally than their previous theatrical releases. The film closed out the 2023 South by Southwest Film & TV Festival on March 18, 2023. The film was released via streaming on Amazon Prime Video on May 12, 2023.

Amazon spent $40–50 million promoting the film, including $7 million on an ad which aired during Super Bowl LVII. According to Deadline, Amazon "relished the long tail of the movie and its impact on Prime Video in terms of views, subscriber hold, and resonance on other parts of Amazon.com."

It was released on Blu-ray and DVD on September 12, 2023, by Warner Bros. Home Entertainment. Despite being a film from Amazon Studios, the physical release is credited as a Metro-Goldwyn-Mayer Pictures release due to the acquisition of that studio by Amazon in 2022.

The film had its broadcast television premiere on ABC on June 11, 2024, serving as a bridge program for the network's broadcast of the 2024 NBA Finals, playing on an off night between Games 2 and 3.

== Reception ==
=== Box office ===
Air grossed $52.5 million in the United States and Canada, and $37.6 million in other territories, for a worldwide total of $90.1 million.

In the United States and Canada, Air was released alongside The Super Mario Bros. Movie, and was projected to gross $16–18 million from 3,507 theaters in its five-day opening weekend. It made $3.2 million on its first day and $2.4 million on its second. The film went on to debut to $14.4 million (and a total of $20.2 million over the five days), finishing third at the box office; 49% of the audience was older than 35. The film made $7.6 million and $5.5 million in its second and third weekend, respectively, finishing fifth both times.

Outside of the US and Canada, Air grossed $10.5 million from 59 markets in its opening weekend. In its second weekend, the film earned $6.2 million from 66 markets for a drop of 34%.

=== Critical response ===
On the review aggregator website Rotten Tomatoes, 93% of 347 critics' reviews are positive, with an average rating of 7.7/10. The website's consensus reads: "A fact-based drama that no one will dunk on, Air aims to dramatize events that changed the sports world forever—and hits almost nothing but net." Metacritic, which uses a weighted average, assigned the film a score of 73 out of 100, based on 59 critics, indicating "generally favorable" reviews. Audiences surveyed by CinemaScore gave the film an average grade of "A" on an A+ to F scale, while those polled by PostTrak gave it a 93% positive score, with 83% saying they would definitely recommend it.

Chicago Sun-Times's Richard Roeper gave the film four out of four stars, writing "Thanks to Affleck's sure-handed, period-piece-perfect direction, a crackling good screenplay by Alex Convery and the lively, funny, warm, passionate performances from the A-list cast, Air is as entertaining and fast-paced as an NBA Finals game that is destined for overtime." Peter Debruge, writing for Variety, gave the film a positive review and praised the performances, saying: "Air ought to be taken as the ultimate example of the American dream, a funny, touching Cinderella story about how the third-place sneaker brand wished upon a star, and how that man—and his mother—were smart enough to know their value." The Hollywood Reporter's Lovia Gyarkye also gave the film a positive review and deemed that, "For most audiences, Air will be worth seeing just for the starry cast—particularly the reunion between Damon and Affleck. Their scenes possess a kinetic and intimate dynamism that the rest of the film approaches but doesn't always match." Filmmakers A. V. Rockwell and Reinaldo Marcus Green cited it as among their favorite films of 2023.

Less flatteringly, NPR's Aisha Harris summarily dismissed the film's "flimsy premise" as a "craven exercise in capitalist exaltation"; though she praised Davis and Messina's performances, Harris resented the overall inadequate character development and concluded with the impression that there was "something ultimately hollow about trying to extract FUBU mentality from what amounts to a two-hour ad for Nike and the uber-rich". Similarly, Peter Bradshaw of The Guardian admonished the film for "looking like the most expensive in-house corporate promo in history: shallow, parochial and obtuse" and also bemoaned the underutilization of Davis, who he described as having "more charisma and force than the rest of the cast put together".

=== Accolades ===
Award	Date of ceremony	Category	Recipient(s)	Result	Ref.
Astra Film and Creative Awards	January 6, 2024	Best Picture	Air	Nominated	
Astra Film and Creative Awards	January 6, 2024	Best Director	Ben Affleck	Nominated	
Astra Film and Creative Awards	January 6, 2024	Best Original Screenplay	Alex Convery	Nominated	
Astra Film and Creative Awards	January 6, 2024	Best Supporting Actress	Viola Davis	Nominated	
Astra Film and Creative Awards	January 6, 2024	Best Cast Ensemble	The cast of Air (Note: Matt Damon, Ben Affleck, Jason Bateman, Chris Messina, Matthew Maher, Marlon Wayans, Jay Mohr, Julius Tennon, Chris Tucker, Viola Davis, Dan Bucatinsky, Gustaf Skarsgård, Jessica Green)	Nominated	
Astra Film and Creative Awards	February 26, 2024	Best Casting	Mary Vernieu, Lindsay Graham Ahanonu	Nominated	
Black Reel Awards	January 16, 2024	Outstanding Supporting Performance	Viola Davis	Nominated	
Black Reel Awards	January 16, 2024	Outstanding Costume Design	Charlese Antoinette Jones	Nominated	
Black Reel Awards	January 16, 2024	Outstanding Hairstyle and Make-up	Carla Farmer	Nominated	
Critics' Choice Movie Awards	January 14, 2024	Best Acting Ensemble	The cast of Air	Nominated	
Critics' Choice Movie Awards	January 14, 2024	Best Original Screenplay	Alex Convery	Nominated	
Critics' Choice Movie Awards	January 14, 2024	Best Editing	William Goldenberg	Nominated	
Golden Globe Awards	January 7, 2024	Best Motion Picture – Musical or Comedy	Air	Nominated	
Golden Globe Awards	January 7, 2024	Best Actor – Motion Picture Musical or Comedy	Matt Damon	Nominated	
Gotham Independent Film Awards	November 27, 2023	Visionary Icon & Creator Tribute	Air	Won	
Heartland Film	2023	Truly Moving Picture Award	Air	Won	
Hollywood Critics Association Midseason Film Awards	June 30, 2023	Best Picture	Air	Nominated	
Hollywood Critics Association Midseason Film Awards	June 30, 2023	Best Director	Ben Affleck	Nominated	
Hollywood Critics Association Midseason Film Awards	June 30, 2023	Best Actor	Matt Damon	Won	
Hollywood Critics Association Midseason Film Awards	June 30, 2023	Best Supporting Actor	Chris Messina	Nominated	
Hollywood Critics Association Midseason Film Awards	June 30, 2023	Best Supporting Actor	Ben Affleck	Nominated	
Hollywood Critics Association Midseason Film Awards	June 30, 2023	Best Supporting Actress	Viola Davis	Won	
Hollywood Critics Association Midseason Film Awards	June 30, 2023	Best Screenplay	Alex Convery	Runner-up	
Hollywood Music in Media Awards	November 15, 2023	Music Supervision — Film	Andrea Von Foerster	Nominated	
Mill Valley Film Festival	October 16, 2023	Variety Screenwriters to Watch	Alex Convery	Won	
San Diego Film Critics Society Awards	December 11, 2023	Best Performance by an Ensemble	The cast of Air	Nominated	
San Diego Film Critics Society Awards	December 11, 2023	Best Use of Music	Air	Nominated	
St. Louis Gateway Film Critics Association Awards	December 10, 2023	Best Supporting Actress	Viola Davis	Nominated	
St. Louis Gateway Film Critics Association Awards	December 10, 2023	Best Original Screenplay	Alex Convery	Nominated	
St. Louis Gateway Film Critics Association Awards	December 10, 2023	Best Soundtrack	Air (Official Soundtrack)	Nominated	
Washington D.C. Area Film Critics Association Awards	December 10, 2023	Best Supporting Actress	Viola Davis	Nominated	
Washington D.C. Area Film Critics Association Awards	December 10, 2023	Best Original Screenplay	Alex Convery	Nominated	
Writers Guild of America Awards	April 14, 2024	Best Original Screenplay	Alex Convery	Nominated	

== Political usage ==
In June 2023, Donald Trump used the monologue from the film in a fundraising 2024 presidential campaign video on Truth Social. Damon and Affleck's production company Artists Equity condemned the usage as unauthorized.

== See also ==
- List of basketball films
