= Detroit Film Critics Society Award for Best Film =

Annual US film award

The Detroit Film Critics Society Award for Best Film is an annual award given by the Detroit Film Critics Society to honor the best film made that year.

== Winners ==
Legend:

indicates the winners.

=== 2000s ===
Year	Winner	Director(s)
2007	No Country for Old Men	Joel and Ethan Coen
2007	Juno	Jason Reitman
2007	Into the Wild	Sean Penn
2007	Le scaphandre et le papillon (The Diving Bell and the Butterfly)	Julian Schnabel
2007	There Will Be Blood	Paul Thomas Anderson
2008	Slumdog Millionaire	Danny Boyle
2008	The Dark Knight	Christopher Nolan
2008	Frost/Nixon	Ron Howard
2008	WALL-E	Andrew Stanton
2008	The Wrestler	Darren Aronofsky
2009	Up	Pete Docter
2009	(500) Days of Summer	Marc Webb
2009	The Hurt Locker	Kathryn Bigelow
2009	Inglourious Basterds	Quentin Tarantino
2009	Up in the Air	Jason Reitman

=== 2010s ===
Year	Winner	Director(s)
2010	The Social Network	David Fincher
2010	127 Hours	Danny Boyle
2010	Inception	Christopher Nolan
2010	The King's Speech	Tom Hooper
2010	Winter's Bone	Debra Granik
2011	The Artist	Michel Hazanavicius
2011	The Descendants	Alexander Payne
2011	Hugo	Martin Scorsese
2011	Take Shelter	Jeff Nichols
2011	The Tree of Life	Terrence Malick
2012	Silver Linings Playbook	David O. Russell
2012	Argo	Ben Affleck
2012	The Impossible	Juan Antonio Bayona
2012	Take This Waltz	Sarah Polley
2012	Zero Dark Thirty	Kathryn Bigelow
2013	Her	Spike Jonze
2013	12 Years a Slave	Steve McQueen
2013	Before Midnight	Richard Linklater
2013	Gravity	Alfonso Cuarón
2013	Short Term 12	Destin Daniel Cretton
2014	Boyhood	Richard Linklater
2014	Birdman or (The Unexpected Virtue of Ignorance)	Alejandro González Iñárritu
2014	The Grand Budapest Hotel	Wes Anderson
2014	Under the Skin	Jonathan Glazer
2014	Whiplash	Damien Chazelle
2015	Spotlight	Tom McCarthy
2015	Brooklyn	John Crowley
2015	Inside Out	Pete Docter
2015	Mad Max: Fury Road	George Miller
2015	The Revenant	Alejandro González Iñárritu
2015	Sicario	Denis Villeneuve
2015	Youth	Paolo Sorrentino
2016	La La Land	Damien Chazelle
2016	The Edge of Seventeen	Kelly Fremon Craig
2016	Hell or High Water	David Mackenzie
2016	Manchester by the Sea	Kenneth Lonergan
2016	Moonlight	Barry Jenkins
2017	The Florida Project	Sean Baker
2017	The Disaster Artist	James Franco
2017	Get Out	Jordan Peele
2017	The Shape of Water	Guillermo del Toro
2017	Three Billboards Outside Ebbing, Missouri	Martin McDonagh
2018	Eighth Grade	Bo Burnham
2018	First Reformed	Paul Schrader
2018	Green Book	Peter Farrelly
2018	A Quiet Place	John Krasinski
2018	Roma	Alfonso Cuarón
2019	Parasite	Bong Joon-ho
2019	The Irishman	Martin Scorsese
2019	Jojo Rabbit	Taika Waititi
2019	Marriage Story	Noah Baumbach
2019	Once Upon a Time in Hollywood	Quentin Tarantino

=== 2020s ===
Year	Winner	Director(s)
2020	Nomadland	Chloé Zhao
2020	First Cow	Kelly Reichardt
2020	Minari	Lee Isaac Chung
2020	Sound of Metal	Darius Marder
2020	The Trial of the Chicago 7	Aaron Sorkin
2021	Cyrano	Joe Wright
2021	Belfast	Kenneth Branagh
2021	CODA	Sian Heder
2021	Don't Look Up	Adam McKay
2021	King Richard	Reinaldo Marcus Green
