= Elle Graham =

American television and film actress

- Born: Elle Charlotte Graham; May 25, 2009 (age 16); Wilmington, North Carolina, U.S.
- Occupation: Actress
- Years active: 2014–present
- Notable work: Secrets of Sulphur Springs and Are You There God? It's Me, Margaret.
- Mother: Emily Graham

Elle Charlotte Graham (born May 25, 2009) is an American television and film actress known for playing Nancy Wheeler in Are You There God? It's Me, Margaret., Savannah Dillon in Secrets of Sulphur Springs, and Sara Hopper in Stranger Things. She also played Susie Coyle in Swamp Thing.

Graham's mother, Emily Graham, is an actress who has appeared in a few movies. She has two sisters and two brothers.
