= Rogue Beard Beer =

American wild ale

- Type: American wild ale
- Manufacturer: Rogue Ales
- Introduced: April 1, 2013
- Website: www.rogue.com/rogue_beer/beard-beer/

Rogue Ales Beard Beer was an American wild ale brewed by Rogue Ales of Newport, Oregon using wild yeast originally cultured from nine beard hairs belonging to Rogue Ales' brewmaster, John Maier.

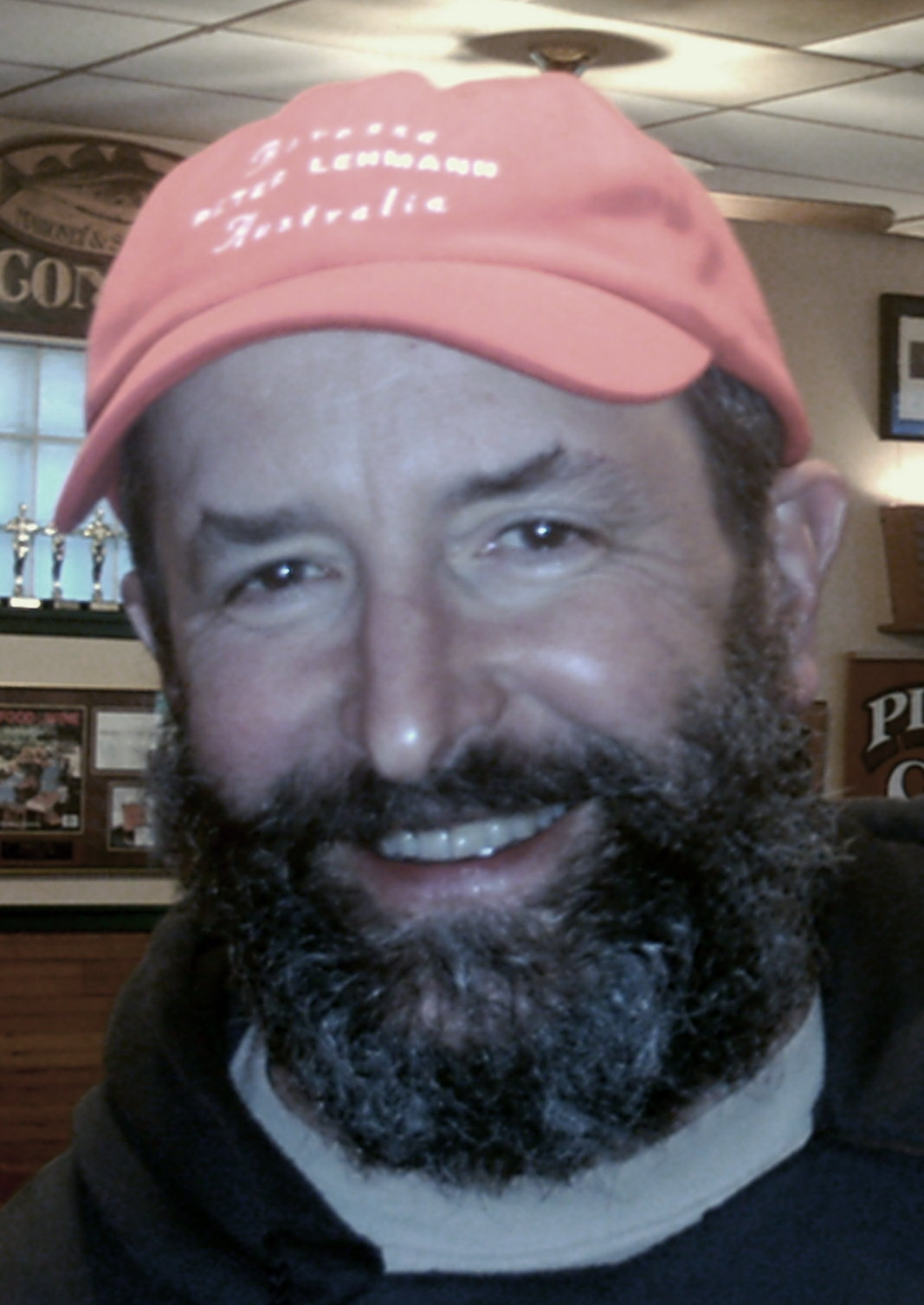
Brewmaster John Maier

Following media coverage in 2012, the beer went on sale on April 1, 2013. When reporting on the introduction of the beer in 2013, The Oregonian newspaper originally stated that the Huffington Post had been taken in by an April Fools' Day joke, but the Oregonian writer was contacted by a Rogue employee, and reported a few days later that it was not a joke. During development, the beer's working name was New Crustacean.

== New yeast strain ==
Rogue set out to find a local wild yeast to complement the locally sourced hops and grains used in their other ales, to "increase the terroir" of the finished product. Unsuitable samples were taken from various places, including the company's hopyard in Independence, Oregon, before the brewmaster's beard was tried.

Isolating and cultivating a new wild yeast or strain of bacteria can be difficult, resulting in "rediscovery" of already utilized organisms. Analysis of the yeast cultivated from Maier's beard showed that it was a new strain, perhaps a hybrid incorporating genes from Rogue's house yeast called "Pacman".

Beverages produced with local American native yeast are collectively known as the American wild ale style, of which Beard Beer is an example. Other American breweries have been successful in developing lines of brewer's yeast from a number of local wild sources, including Dogfish Head Brewery (cultivated from skins of Delaware peaches), Lost Rhino Brewing (captured at Janelia Farm) Mystic Brewing (Massachusetts plums), and Linden Street Brewery (cultivated from San Francisco sourdough).

== Critical reception ==
Willamette Week's reviewer said "The beer itself is quite normal: a sweet, bread-y American wild ale without much to distinguish it beyond a notable pineapple flavor." Writing for The Baltimore Sun, another reviewer praised the beer's "smooth finish and citrus notes". xoJane's reviewer questioned Rogue's "gimmicky" beers in its lineup, but concluded its "sweet and bready and kinda pineapple-y" taste was reminiscent of a Belgian single. A review from the website Flavor 574 described the beer as having a funky flavor. Details magazine included the brew on their "Best Weird Brews of Summer" list in 2013; and Gayot Guides lists it among its top ten weird beers, profiling it as "reminiscent of a Belgian saison, with a hazy orangish hue and flavors of bready malt, spicy peppercorn, tropical mango, passion fruit and pineapple". Paste magazine listed it as "really weird" along with beers including pickle, meteorite dust, and scorpion. The Massachusetts Daily Collegian reviewed it at length, noting it "meld[s] odors of smoke, olives and nebulously Belgian-influenced yeast... funky aromatic notes... initial citrusy sourness is balanced out by the fullness of toasted bread laced with a tangy sweetness... a simultaneously sour and sweet flavor complexion... traces of some distinctly Belgian elements... more closely aligned with saison and farmhouse ale styles". Daniel Tapper from the UK daily The Guardian reviewed five wild beers and called Beard Beer "the weirdest beer I've ever tried" and described it as containing notes of banana, passionfruit and pineapple.

An article from The New Zealand Herald published in 2014 listed the beard hair used in Rogue Beard Beer as the number one strangest craft beer ingredient, ahead of other additions including cat feces and bull's testicles. Rogue made the New Zealand Herald list twice, with the additional inclusion of its maple bacon ale, co-branded with Portland's Voodoo Doughnut.
