= Adrienne Brodeur =

American author

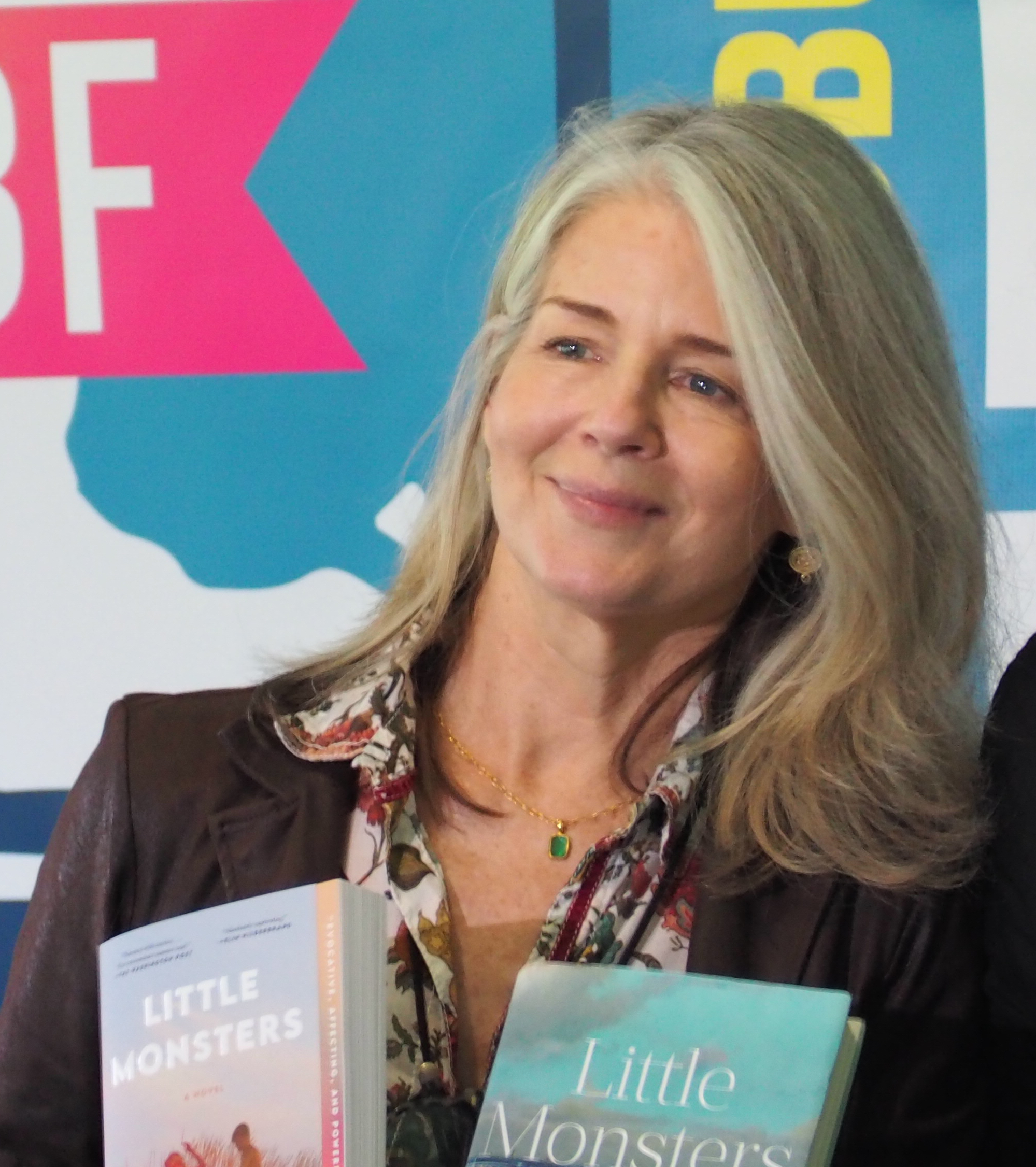
- Adrienne Brodeur at the 2024 Gaithersburg Book Festival
- Education: Columbia University (BA); University of Pennsylvania (MPA)
- Occupation: Author
- Relatives: Paul Brodeur (father); Malabar Brewster (mother)
- Writing career
- Genres: Memoir, novel
- Notable works: Little Monsters (2023); Wild Game (2019)
- Website: www.adriennewbrodeur.com

Adrienne Brodeur is an American writer. She is the author of the best-selling memoir Wild Game: My Mother, Her Lover and Me (2019) and the novel Little Monsters (2023), as well as the novel Man Camp (2005). She has also written for publications such as The New York Times, The Oprah Magazine, Vogue, and Glamour. Brodeur is executive director of Aspen Words, a literary arts nonprofit and program of The Aspen Institute. She launched the Aspen Words Literary Prize in 2017 and the Aspen Literary Festival in 2025.

== Early life and education ==
Brodeur is the daughter of New Yorker writer Paul Brodeur and food writer Malabar Brewster. Her grandfather was the board chairman of Dayton, Price & Co., Ltd., a New York exporting and shipping firm. Her mother remarried in 1974 to Henry Hornblower II, a grandson of Henry Hornblower, founder of the investment firm Hornblower & Weeks, which eventually became part of Lehman Brothers through various mergers. Her stepfather founded the Plimoth Plantation and served as its president.

She was raised on Cape Cod. In her memoir, Brodeur writes about her relationship with her mother, whose affair she helped hide from her stepfather Charles Greenwood. In interviews she has said that it took her two and a half years to write the book and "a lifetime to process [it]."

She obtained her BA from Columbia University and received an MPA from the University of Pennsylvania.

== Career ==
In 1997, Brodeur founded the fiction magazine, Zoetrope: All-Story, with filmmaker Francis Ford Coppola. She served as editor-in-chief until 2002.

In 2005, Brodeur became an editor at Harcourt HMH Books, where she acquired and edited literary fiction and memoir. She left publishing in 2013 to become Creative Director of Aspen Words, where she is now executive director. In 2017, Brodeur launched the Aspen Words Literary Prize, a $35,000 annual award for an influential work of fiction that illuminates a vital contemporary issue and demonstrates the transformative power of literature on thought and culture.

== Personal life ==
Brodeur splits her time between Cambridge, Massachusetts and Cape Cod. She lives with her husband and two children.
