= Zoetrope: All-Story =

American literary magazine

- Vol. 9, No. 3
- Editor: Michael Ray
- Categories: Literary magazine
- Frequency: Quarterly
- Founder: Francis Ford Coppola and Adrienne Brodeur
- Founded: 1997; 28 years ago
- Company: American Zoetrope
- Country: United States
- Based in: San Francisco
- Website: www.all-story.com
- ISSN: 1091-2495

Zoetrope: All-Story is an American literary magazine that was launched in 1997 by Francis Ford Coppola and Adrienne Brodeur. All-Story intends to publish new short fiction. Zoetrope: All-Story has received the National Magazine Award for Fiction.

== Content ==
The magazine has published first-time work by David Benioff, Adam Haslett, Pauls Toutonghi, and Daniyal Mueenuddin; published work by already emerging authors Chris Adrian, Ben Fountain, Miranda July, David Means, and Karen Russell; and published work by established authors Don DeLillo, David Mamet, Gabriel García Márquez, Cynthia Ozick, and Salman Rushdie.

Each All-Story issue includes a Classic Reprint. Alongside previously unpublished fiction and one-act plays, the Classic Reprint illustrates a piece of short fiction or drama that has been adapted to film or inspired a movie. Steven Millhauser's story "Eisenheim the Illusionist", which inspired Neil Burger's 2006 film The Illusionist, Alice Munro's story "The Bear Came Over The Mountain", which Sarah Polley adapted into the film Away From Her in 2006, and Wes Anderson's screenplay for the short film Hotel Chevalier in Winter 2007 are examples.

In addition, a guest designer constructs the quarterly's issues. Since Helmut Newton was invited to design the magazine in 1998, artists (Wayne Thiebaud), musicians (David Bowie, Tom Waits and Will Oldham), actors (Dennis Hopper), and directors (Gus Van Sant and Peter Greenaway) have contributed to the magazine's visual aesthetic as guest designers.

== Contests ==
Zoetrope: All-Story sponsors an annual writing contest for short fiction. The contest has been judged by writers Joyce Carol Oates, Colum McCann Mary Gaitskill and Tommy Orange. The winner and finalists' stories are forwarded to leading literary agencies. The winning story is often published in an online supplement to the magazine.

== Writing workshops ==
Hosted by Francis Ford Coppola's Blancaneaux Lodge in Belize, Zoetrope: All-Story runs an annual writing workshop. A small group of writers spend a week studying and writing under the tutelage of professional authors and the magazine's editor, Michael Ray.

Zoetrope: All-Story also runs year-round online workshops through a partnership with Gotham Writers Workshop.

== See also ==
- List of literary magazines
