= The Edge of Seventeen =

2016 film by Kelly Fremon Craig

- Theatrical release poster
- Directed by: Kelly Fremon Craig
- Written by: Kelly Fremon Craig
- Produced by: James L. Brooks; Richard Sakai; Julie Ansell
- Starring: Hailee Steinfeld; Woody Harrelson; Kyra Sedgwick; Haley Lu Richardson
- Cinematography: Doug Emmett
- Edited by: Tracey Wadmore-Smith
- Music by: Atli Örvarsson
- Production companies: STX Entertainment; H. Brothers; Tang Media Productions; Gracie Films; Virgin Produced
- Distributed by: STX Entertainment
- Release dates: September 16, 2016 (TIFF); November 18, 2016 (United States)
- Running time: 104 minutes
- Country: United States
- Language: English
- Budget: $9 million
- Box office: $19.4 million

The Edge of Seventeen is a 2016 American coming-of-age comedy-drama film written and directed by Kelly Fremon Craig, in her directorial debut. The film stars Hailee Steinfeld, Woody Harrelson, Kyra Sedgwick, and Haley Lu Richardson.

The film premiered at the 2016 Toronto International Film Festival on September 16, 2016, and was theatrically released on November 18, 2016, by STXfilms.

It received positive reviews, with Steinfeld's performance being critically acclaimed. The film grossed more than $19.4 million against a budget of $9 million.

== Plot ==
Seventeen-year-old Nadine Franklin has tempestuous relationships with her popular older brother Darian and her image-conscious mother Mona but was close to her late father Tom. He died of a heart attack when Nadine was thirteen, and her best friend Krista is the only person keeping her buoyed.

Mona travels to the Oregon Coast to meet a boyfriend, and in her absence, Nadine and Krista get extremely drunk. Darian throws a pool party at the house and, after throwing up, Nadine falls asleep while Krista talks to Darian. The next morning, Nadine finds Krista with Darian in bed, straining the girls' friendship.

The next day at school, Krista insists Nadine join her at a house party to which Darian has invited her. When they arrive, Darian introduces Krista to other students, leaving Nadine on her own. After failed attempts at mingling, Nadine sits outside with another partygoer, who remarks how inferior Nadine seems compared to her brother, and Nadine leaves the party.

Nadine turns to her classmate Erwin Kim, who has a crush on her. She is attracted to older student Nick Mossman and makes inept attempts to attract him. She invites Erwin to an amusement park, but she rejects his attempt to kiss her. At the end of the night, Nadine tells him he is a great guy and they become friends.

At school, Krista confronts Nadine for ignoring her, and Nadine says Darian does not care about Krista and will soon drop her. Krista retorts that Darian has asked her to be his girlfriend and to prom, which is months away. Insecure and desperate, Nadine says Krista must choose between her or Darian. When she refuses to do so, Nadine ends their friendship.

For support at school, Nadine turns to world-weary teacher Max Bruner, who says she is his favorite student to cheer her up. Nadine goes swimming in Erwin's pool and finds his house is luxurious and his family is wealthy. She learns Erwin is a talented animation filmmaker and accepts his invitation to their school's short film festival.

Mona has been giving Nadine a ride to school since her falling out with Krista. One day, Nadine refuses to get out of the car when she sees Krista arriving at school at the same time, which leads to Mona bringing Nadine to work with her. There, they argue about her father, and Nadine steals Mona's car. She drives to a playground, and pours her heart out to Nick in a sexually explicit text. She resolves to delete the message but then accidentally sends it, much to her horror.

Nadine drives to school and flippantly tells Bruner she is going to kill herself, and he tries to reassure her everything will be fine. Nick replies to her text, asking her to hang out. Mona calls Darian while he is with Krista and some friends, telling him that Nadine is missing. Darian and Krista leave to find her.

Nick, having taken Nadine's explicit text seriously, attempts to have sex with her in his car, and angrily belittles her when she rejects his advances. Humiliated and heartbroken, Nadine tearfully runs away and calls Bruner, who takes her back to his house where they wait for Darian to arrive. Nadine meets Bruner's wife and child there. Darian arrives, and when Nadine refuses to go home with him upon seeing Krista in the car, Darian sarcastically reveals to Nadine he has suffered from the pressures of taking their father's place, saying he feels trapped and did not apply to distant colleges because their mother is so dependent on him; The only person who makes him happy is Krista, but he dislikes that it destroys Nadine for him to be with Krista. Darian asks Bruner to give Nadine a ride home. Back at their house, Nadine tells Darian about her own feelings of self-hatred and envy. They hug, ending their feud.

As Nadine leaves for the film festival in the morning, she and Krista reconcile and agree to catch up later. Realizing that Mona is still worried she has run away, Nadine texts her that she is safe, and Mona decides to trust her word. Erwin's animated film is about an alien boy who falls in love with a girl at high school but is rejected. The girl resembles Nadine and wears sneakers similar to hers. After the film, Nadine hands Erwin flowers she picked for him and apologizes for taking so long to accept his affection, and he jokingly says the film is not about her. Erwin is congratulated by his colleagues and introduces Nadine, who greets them with a smile.

== Cast ==
- Hailee Steinfeld as Nadine Franklin, Darian's younger sister, and Mona and Tom's daughter.
  - Lina Renna portrays Nadine as a child.
- Woody Harrelson as Max Bruner, Nadine's high school teacher and Greer's husband.
- Haley Lu Richardson as Krista, Nadine's best friend and Darian's girlfriend.
  - Ava Grace Cooper portrays Krista as a child.
- Blake Jenner as Darian Franklin, Nadine's older brother and Mona and Tom's son, Krista's boyfriend.
  - Christian Michael Cooper portrays Darian as a child.
- Hayden Szeto as Erwin Kim, Nadine's awkward admirer.
- Kyra Sedgwick as Mona Franklin, Tom's widow and Darian and Nadine's mother.
- Eric Keenleyside as Tom Franklin, Mona's late husband and Darian and Nadine's father.
- Alexander Calvert as Nick Mossman, an older boy that Nadine is attracted to.
- Nesta Cooper as Shannon, a friend of Darian's.
- Meredith Monroe as Greer Bruner, Max's wife.

== Production ==
In 2011, screenwriter Kelly Fremon Craig sent a copy of her screenplay, Besties, to producer James L. Brooks, hoping that Brooks would produce the film. Craig recalled, "I had written a spec version of this film, and had been just an insane fan of Jim's for years and years. He was the crazy longshot I took in the beginning! And one I never thought would actually work. But I sent him the script and he ended up taking on the project." The Edge of Seventeen is Craig's directorial debut. She also produced the film.

On August 4, 2015, Hailee Steinfeld was cast to play the lead role, while Richard Sakai was also attached as a producer of the film. On September 24, 2015, Woody Harrelson and Kyra Sedgwick joined the film's cast, with Harrelson playing the role of a high school teacher and Sedgwick as the main character's mother. On October 6, 2015, Blake Jenner was cast in the film as Nadine's older brother, a popular and handsome soccer player who begins dating Nadine's best friend Krista. Hayden Szeto was cast in the film as Erwin Kim, Nadine's earnest classmate, who fumbles several attempts to win her affection through much of the story. Haley Lu Richardson joined the film to play the role of Nadine's best friend Krista.

Principal photography on the film began on October 21, 2015, in Vancouver, then in Anaheim, California. Filming also took place at Guildford Park Secondary School and near Guildford Town Centre in Surrey, British Columbia. Port Moody was also shown, with the film festival taking place in City Hall. Filming wrapped on December 3, 2015.

== Release ==
The Edge of Seventeen, distributed by STX Entertainment, was originally scheduled to be released on September 30, 2016, before being moved to November 18. Stage 6 Films and Sony Pictures Releasing International handle some distribution rights to the film outside the United States.

The film was released on Blu-ray and DVD by Universal Home Entertainment on February 14, 2017.

== Reception ==
=== Box office ===
The Edge of Seventeen grossed $14.4 million in the United States and Canada and $4.4 million in other territories for a total of $18.8 million, against a production budget of $9 million.

In North America, the film was released alongside the openings of Fantastic Beasts and Where to Find Them and Bleed for This, as well as the wide expansions of Moonlight and Billy Lynn's Long Halftime Walk. It was initially expected to gross around $8 million from 1,900 theaters. However, after grossing $1.8 million on its first day, weekend projections were lowered to $4–5 million; it ended up opening with $4.8 million, finishing number seven at the box office.

=== Critical response ===
On review aggregator Rotten Tomatoes, the film has an approval rating of 94% based on 222 reviews, with an average rating of 7.90/10. The website's critical consensus reads, "The Edge of Seventeen's sharp script – and Hailee Steinfeld's outstanding lead performance – make this more than just another coming-of-age dramedy." On Metacritic, the film has a weighted average score of 77 out of 100, based on 38 critics, indicating "generally favorable reviews". Audiences polled by CinemaScore gave the film an average grade of "A−" on an A+ to F scale.

== Accolades ==
List of awards and nominations
| Award | Date of ceremony | Category | Recipients | Result | Refs |
|---|---|---|---|---|---|
| Austin Film Critics Association | December 28, 2016 | Best First Film | The Edge of Seventeen | Nominated | |
| Chicago Film Critics Association | December 15, 2016 | Most Promising Filmmaker | Kelly Fremon Craig | Nominated | |
| Critics' Choice Awards | December 11, 2016 | Best Young Performer | Hailee Steinfeld | Nominated | |
| Critics' Choice Awards | December 11, 2016 | Best Actress in a Comedy | Hailee Steinfeld | Nominated | |
| Critics' Choice Awards | December 11, 2016 | Best Comedy | Kelly Fremon Craig | Nominated | |
| Detroit Film Critics Society | December 19, 2016 | Best Film | The Edge of Seventeen | Nominated | |
| Detroit Film Critics Society | December 19, 2016 | Best Breakthrough | Kelly Fremon Craig (director and screenwriter) | Won | |
| Directors Guild of America Awards | February 4, 2017 | Outstanding Directing – First-Time Feature Film | Kelly Fremon Craig | Nominated | |
| Golden Globe Awards | January 8, 2017 | Best Actress – Motion Picture Comedy or Musical | Hailee Steinfeld | Nominated | |
| Golden Tomato Awards | January 12, 2017 | Best Comedy Movie 2016 | The Edge of Seventeen | 5th Place | |
| MTV Movie & TV Awards | May 7, 2017 | Movie of the Year | The Edge of Seventeen | Nominated | |
| MTV Movie & TV Awards | May 7, 2017 | Best Actor in a Movie | Hailee Steinfeld | Nominated | |
| New York Film Critics Circle | December 1, 2016 | Best First Film | Kelly Fremon Craig | Won (Note: Tied with Trey Edward Shults for Krisha.) | |
| Teen Choice Awards | August 13, 2017 | Choice Movie: Drama | The Edge of Seventeen | Nominated | |
| Teen Choice Awards | August 13, 2017 | Choice Movie Actress: Drama | Hailee Steinfeld | Nominated | |
| Toronto Film Critics Association | December 11, 2016 | Best First Feature | The Edge of Seventeen | Runner-up | |
| Washington D.C. Area Film Critics Association | December 5, 2016 | Best Youth Performance | Hailee Steinfeld | Nominated | |
| Women Film Critics Circle | December 19, 2016 | Best Young Actress | Hailee Steinfeld | Won | |

== Cancelled spin-off ==
In May 2018, it was announced that YouTube Premium began development for a spin-off web series based on the film that would be exclusive to their platform. Annabel Oakes would pen the pilot, while Fremon Craig would be executive producer for the series. In May 2020, it was confirmed by Oakes that the series had been cancelled.
