= Kelly Fremon Craig =

American filmmaker and screenwriter (born 1981)

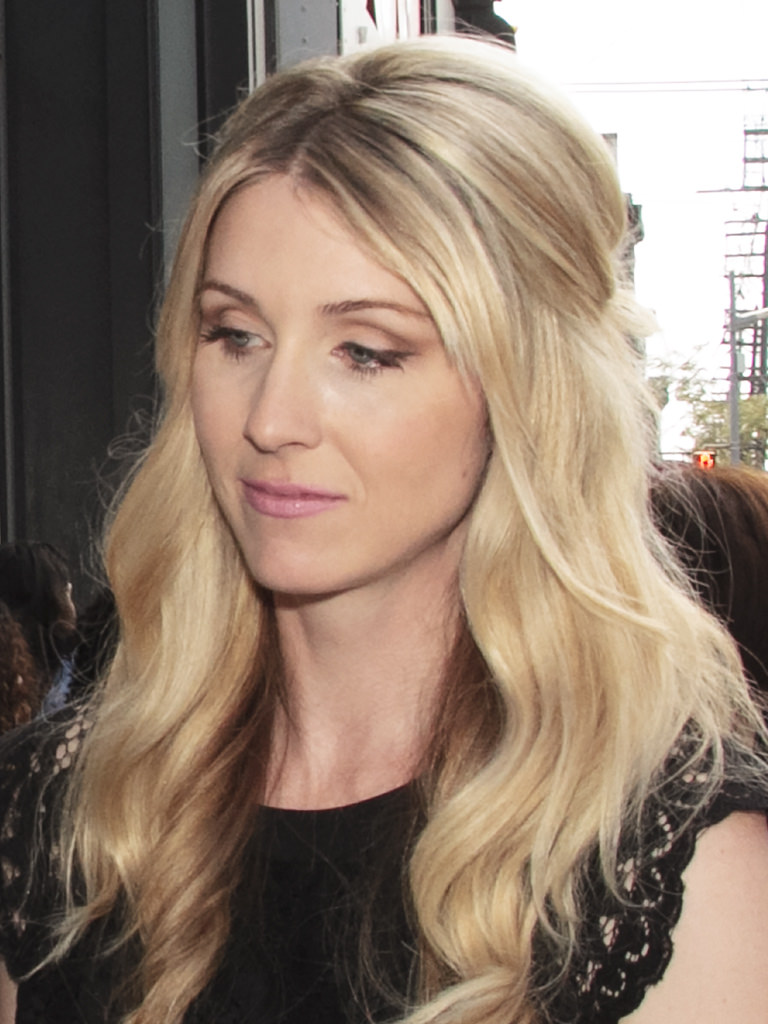
- Fremon Craig in 2016
- Born: Kelly Fremon; May 28, 1980 (age 46); Whittier, California, U.S.
- Education: University of California, Irvine
- Occupations: Film director, screenwriter, producer
- Years active: 2008–present
- Notable work: The Edge of Seventeen; Are You There God? It's Me, Margaret.
- Children: 1

Kelly Fremon Craig (born May 28, 1980) is an American screenwriter, producer, and film director. She is known for writing and directing the 2016 coming-of-age dramedy The Edge of Seventeen and the 2023 adaptation of Judy Blume's classic middle-grade novel, Are You There God? It's Me, Margaret.

== Early life ==
Fremon Craig was born in Whittier, California and graduated from UC Irvine with an English degree. When she was 13, she watched a lot of MTV, which sparked her interest in music videos. She stated that music videos were "like little short films". Spoken word poetry was what Fremon Craig initially began writing.

== Career ==
=== 2000s: Early Career and Post Grad ===
Fremon Craig started out by writing sketch comedy and spoken word poetry in college, which landed her an internship at Immortal Entertainment’s film division, where she read her first film script and began to pursue screenwriting. She developed several specs during the 2000s, including a high school retelling of Cyrano de Bergerac and a comedic remake of the 2004 French drama Intimate Strangers for Paramount Pictures. One of her scripts, Ticket to Ride, caught the attention of Ghostbusters director Ivan Reitman. He bought the script under his The Montecito Picture Company as a directing vehicle for himself. According to Reitman, the script was rewritten at least 15 times. The film was released, under the new title Post Grad and was instead directed by Shrek director Vicky Jenson. ‘The film was released in 2009 to critical and commercial disappointment.

=== 2010s: The Edge of Seventeen ===
In 2011, Fremon Craig completed another script titled Besties and sent the script to James L. Brooks. Brooks bought the script and it was announced that Fremon Craig would direct the film and Brooks would serve as a producer and mentor for her first film. No updates were issued for the feature until August 2015, when Hailee Steinfeld was announced to star in the film. Casting continued until October of that same year, with filming commencing that same month.

The film was released by STX Entertainment in Fall 2016 under its new title The Edge of Seventeen to critical praise and it was a modest financial hit. Fremon Craig kept a series of journals that helped inspire her while writing The Edge of Seventeen. She took some of these journal entries and formed them into the script. For research on the film and script, Fremon Craig went to high schools and hung out with teenagers to better understand what their lives were like. Fremon Craig also provided uncredited rewrites (and was briefly attached as co-screenwriter) for the 2018 Transformers spin-off film, Bumblebee, which also starred Steinfeld.

=== 2020s: Are You There God? It's Me, Margaret. ===
Fremon Craig was originally attached as the sole screenwriter for an animated film adaptation of Scooby-Doo for Warner Animation Group. The film, released as Scoob! in 2020, was instead rewritten by Adam Sztykiel, Jack Donaldson, Derek Elliott, Matt Lieberman, Eyal Podell, and Jonathon E. Stewart.

Fremon Craig collaborated again with James L. Brooks in the film adaptation of the Judy Blume book Are You There God? It's Me, Margaret. In August 2018, Craig drafted an email for her agent to send to Judy Blume, expressing an interest in adapting one of her books for film but without a specific one in mind. She let Blume know her books were "a north star for me" while directing The Edge of Seventeen; Blume had seen the film and thought the director might handle an adaptation of one of her books well. After reading through Blume's oeuvre, Craig decided the 1970 young adult novel Are You There God? It's Me, Margaret was the one she wanted to adapt. Brooks, who had produced Fremon Craig's first movie, soon got on board.

In September 2019, Blume took a meeting with Fremon Craig and Brooks at her home in Key West. Following their meeting, Fremon Craig began writing the script and sent Blume drafts through the end of 2019 and into 2020. "She couldn't have been more wonderful with her notes and ideas," Craig told Blume's biographer Mark Oppenheimer. "There were places I had to take license, but she was so permission-giving about that, she had written this iconic book, [and] it would be so easy to be precious about everything."

=== Unrealized projects ===
- Intimate Strangers for Paramount Pictures
- A modern-day high school retelling of Cyrano de Bergerac for Level 1
- The Good Life for Fox Searchlight Pictures
- The Best Mistakes for Level 1
- Lovehampton for The CW and Alloy Entertainment
- An untitled pilot for CBS Television Studios and Uppity TV
- Wild Game, a film adaptation of the memoir Wild Game: My Mother, Her Lover, and Me for Chernin Entertainment
- Scoob! rewrites for Warner Animation Group and Warner Bros. Pictures
- Untitled The Edge of Seventeen web series for YouTube Premium

== Influences ==
Fremon Craig has cited writer-director John Hughes as an influence on writing The Edge of Seventeen, and has mentioned Christopher Guest, Alexander Payne, Nick Hornby, and David Sedaris as inspirations. She also takes inspiration from Nora Ephron by taking moments of her own life and putting them into her writing. Fremon Craig stated that James L. Brooks is her comedy idol, “there's nobody in the world I love more than Jim Brooks. He is the reason I wanted to be a filmmaker."

== Personal life ==
As of 2016, Fremon Craig resides in Los Angeles with her husband and son. She is represented by UTA and Kaplan/Perrone.

== Filmography ==
Short film writer

- Streak (2008) (Story only)

Feature film

Year	Title	Director	Writer	Producer
2009	Post Grad	No	Yes	No
2016	The Edge of Seventeen	Yes	Yes	No
2023	Are You There God? It's Me, Margaret.	Yes	Yes	Yes
2024	Ordinary Angels	No	Yes	No

Uncredited rewrites

- Bumblebee (2018)

== Accolades ==
List of awards and nominations
Year	Award	Category	Nominated work	Result	Notes
2016	Critics' Choice Movie Awards	Best Comedy	The Edge of Seventeen	Nominated	
2016	New York Film Critics Circle	Best First Film	The Edge of Seventeen	Won (Note: Tied with Trey Edward Shults for Krisha.)	
2016	Chicago Film Critics Association	Most Promising Filmmaker	The Edge of Seventeen	Nominated	
2016	Toronto Film Critics Association	Best First Feature	The Edge of Seventeen	Runner-up	
2016	Detroit Film Critics Society	Best Film	The Edge of Seventeen	Nominated	
2016	Detroit Film Critics Society	Best Breakthrough	The Edge of Seventeen	Won	
2016	Austin Film Critics Association	Best First Film	The Edge of Seventeen	Nominated	
2016	Indiewire Critics' Poll	Best First Feature	The Edge of Seventeen	3rd place	
2016	Las Vegas Film Critics Society Awards	Breakout Filmmaker of the Year	The Edge of Seventeen	Nominated	
2017	Oklahoma Film Critics Circle Awards	OFCC Award for Best First Film	The Edge of Seventeen	2nd place	
2017	Directors Guild of America Awards	First-Time Feature Film	The Edge of Seventeen	Nominated	
2017	Golden Tomato Awards	Best Comedy Movie 2016	The Edge of Seventeen	5th place	
2017	Online Film & Television Association	Best Feature Debut	The Edge of Seventeen	Nominated	
2017	2017 MTV Movie & TV Awards	Best Movie	The Edge of Seventeen	Nominated	
2023	Hollywood Critics Association Midseason Film Awards	Best Director	Are You There God? It's Me, Margaret.	Nominated	
2023	Hollywood Critics Association Midseason Film Awards	Best Screenplay	Are You There God? It's Me, Margaret.	Nominated	
2023	Chicago Film Critics Association Awards	Best Adapted Screenplay	Are You There God? It's Me, Margaret.	Nominated	
2023	Boston Society of Film Critics	Best Adapted Screenplay	Are You There God? It's Me, Margaret.	Runner-up	
2023	St. Louis Film Critics Association	Best Adapted Screenplay	Are You There God? It's Me, Margaret.	Nominated	
2023	Florida Film Critics Circle Awards	Best Adapted Screenplay	Are You There God? It's Me, Margaret.	Nominated	
2023	San Diego Film Critics Society	Best Director	Are You There God? It's Me, Margaret.	Nominated	
2023	San Diego Film Critics Society	Best Adapted Screenplay	Are You There God? It's Me, Margaret.	Won	
2023	Women Film Critics Circle	Best Woman Storyteller	Are You There God? It's Me, Margaret.	Runner-up	
2024	Astra Film and Creative Awards	Best Adapted Screenplay	Are You There God? It's Me, Margaret.	Nominated	
2024	Critics' Choice Awards	Best Adapted Screenplay	Are You There God? It's Me, Margaret.	Nominated	
2024	Georgia Film Critics Association	Best Adapted Screenplay	Are You There God? It's Me, Margaret.	Nominated	
