= Rob Strasser =

Pioneer in the sports apparel industry

- Born: October 5, 1947
- Died: October 15, 1993 (aged 46)
- Occupations: Marketing and Management
- Known for: Leadership at Nike and Adidas

Robert Jay Strasser (5 October 1947 – 15 October 1993) was a pioneering figure in the sports apparel industry, playing instrumental roles at Nike and Adidas. He was notably involved in the launch of the Air Jordan line at Nike and later helped rejuvenate Adidas as a significant competitor.

== Career ==
=== Early career ===
Strasser was a graduate of Willamette University in Salem and the UC Berkeley School of Law. He started his career as a lawyer in Portland, Oregon, where he represented Nike (under its original name, Blue Ribbon Sports) and drew the attention of its founder Phil Knight.

=== Nike ===
Strasser joined Nike during its early years. His audacious and unconventional style was critical in shaping Nike's trajectory, most notably in the launch of the Air Jordan line. Strasser led Nike's strategic war against Adidas, Nike's key rival, and was instrumental in Nike's charge into European markets.

In 1987, Strasser left Nike due to ideological differences with Phil Knight and partnered with Peter Moore in a consulting firm, Sports Inc.

=== Adidas ===
Strasser's career took an unexpected turn when he was recruited by Adidas, the company he had once helped Nike to defeat. Tasked with rejuvenating the struggling brand, Strasser and Moore relocated Adidas's North American headquarters to Portland. Their strategy focused on reducing the brand to its iconic core, a move that resonated with consumers.

== Legacy ==
Despite Strasser's complicated relationships with both Nike and Adidas, his influence on Portland's economy and culture remains indisputable. His loyalty to the city helped shape Portland into a major player in the sportswear industry.

Strasser was portrayed by Jason Bateman in the 2023 movie Air.
