= 1982 NCAA Men's Basketball All-Americans =

- Awarded for: 1981–82 NCAA Division I men's basketball season

The Consensus 1982 College Basketball All-American team, as determined by aggregating the results of four major All-American teams. To earn "consensus" status, a player must win honors from a majority of the following teams: the Associated Press, the USBWA, The United Press International and the National Association of Basketball Coaches.

== 1982 Consensus All-America team ==
Consensus First Team
Player	Position	Class	Team
Terry Cummings	F	Junior	DePaul
Quintin Dailey	G	Junior	San Francisco
Eric Floyd	G	Senior	Georgetown
Ralph Sampson	C	Junior	Virginia
James Worthy	F	Junior	North Carolina

Consensus Second Team
Player	Position	Class	Team
Dale Ellis	F	Junior	Tennessee
Kevin Magee	F	Senior	UC Irvine
John Paxson	G	Junior	Notre Dame
Sam Perkins	F/C	Sophomore	North Carolina
Paul Pressey	F/G	Senior	Tulsa

== Individual All-America teams ==
All-America Team
All-America Team	First team		Second team		Third team	
All-America Team	Player	School	Player	School	Player	School
Associated Press	Terry Cummings	DePaul	Lester Conner	Oregon State	Dan Callandrillo	Seton Hall
Associated Press	Quintin Dailey	San Francisco	Dale Ellis	Tennessee	Ricky Frazier	Missouri
Associated Press	Eric Floyd	Georgetown	Keith Lee	Memphis State	Ricky Pierce	Rice
Associated Press	Kevin Magee	UC Irvine	Terry Teagle	Baylor	Paul Pressey	Tulsa
Associated Press	Ralph Sampson	Virginia	James Worthy	North Carolina	Dominique Wilkins	Georgia
USBWA	Terry Cummings	DePaul	Eric Floyd	Georgetown	No third team	
USBWA	Quintin Dailey	San Francisco	Bill Garnett	Wyoming	No third team	
USBWA	Dale Ellis	Tennessee	Sam Perkins	North Carolina	No third team	
USBWA	Kevin Magee	UC Irvine	Ricky Pierce	Rice	No third team	
USBWA	Ralph Sampson	Virginia	Paul Pressey	Tulsa	No third team	
USBWA	James Worthy	North Carolina			No third team	
NABC	Terry Cummings	DePaul	Quintin Dailey	San Francisco	John Bagley	Boston College
NABC	Eric Floyd	Georgetown	Kevin Magee	UC Irvine	Dan Callandrillo	Seton Hall
NABC	John Paxson	Notre Dame	Sam Perkins	North Carolina	Dale Ellis	Tennessee
NABC	Ralph Sampson	Virginia	Paul Pressey	Tulsa	Ricky Frazier	Missouri
NABC	James Worthy	North Carolina	Dominique Wilkins	Georgia	Ricky Pierce	Rice
UPI	Terry Cummings	DePaul	Kevin Magee	UC Irvine	Dan Callandrillo	Seton Hall
UPI	Quintin Dailey	San Francisco	John Paxson	Notre Dame	Lester Conner	Oregon State
UPI	Eric Floyd	Georgetown	Sam Perkins	North Carolina	Ricky Frazier	Missouri
UPI	Ralph Sampson	Virginia	Paul Pressey	Tulsa	Ted Kitchel	Indiana
UPI	James Worthy	North Carolina	Dominique Wilkins	Georgia	Mark McNamara	California

AP Honorable Mention:

- Dwight Anderson, Southern California
- Mitchell Anderson, Bradley
- Doug Arnold, Texas Christian
- Bruce Atkins, Duquesne
- John Bagley, Boston College
- Steve Barker, Samford
- Jerry Beck, Middle Tennessee
- Boot Bond, Pepperdine
- Randy Breuer, Minnesota
- Wallace Bryant, San Francisco
- Steve Burtt, Iona
- Antoine Carr, Wichita State
- Ronnie Carr, Western Carolina
- Dan Caldwell, Washington
- Howard Carter, Louisiana State
- Riley Clarida, Long Island
- Carlos Clark, Mississippi
- Albert Culton, Texas–Arlington
- Clarence Dickerson, Hawaii
- Skip Dillard, DePaul
- Joe Dumars, McNeese State
- Bill Dunlap, Gonzaga
- Keith Edmonson, Purdue
- Patrick Ewing, Georgetown
- Kenny Fields, UCLA
- Jimmy Foster, South Carolina
- Bill Garnett, Wyoming
- Stewart Granger, Villanova
- Butch Graves, Yale
- Ken Green, Nevada-Reno
- Sidney Green, UNLV
- Mike Hackett, Jacksonville
- Chipper Harris, Robert Morris
- Scott Hastings, Arkansas
- Granger Hall, Temple
- Rod Higgins, Fresno State
- Roy Hinson, Rutgers
- Derrick Hord, Kentucky
- Joe Jakubick, Akron
- Greg Jones, West Virginia
- Mark Jones, St. Bonaventure
- Clark Kellogg, Ohio State
- Harry Kelly, Texas Southern
- Ted Kitchel, Indiana
- Brad Leaf, Evansville
- Lafayette Lever, Arizona State
- Cliff Levingston, Wichita State
- Paul Little, Pennsylvania
- Kenneth Lyons, North Texas State
- David Maxwell, Fordham
- Mark McNamara, California
- Jack Moore, Nebraska
- Perry Moss, Northeastern
- Ed Nealy, Kansas State
- Mark Nickens, American
- Ken Owens, Idaho
- John Paxson, Notre Dame
- Sam Perkins, North Carolina
- Eddie Phillips, Alabama
- John Pinone, Villanova
- Allen Rayhorn, Northern Illinois
- John Revelli, Stanford
- Fred Roberts, Brigham Young
- Oliver Robinson, Alabama-Birmingham
- David Russell, St. John's
- Walker Russell, Western Michigan
- Mike Sanders, UCLA
- Erich Santifer, Syracuse
- Wayne Sappleton, Loyola (IL)
- John Schweitz, Richmond
- Charlie Sitton, Oregon State
- Jose Slaughter, Portland
- Derek Smith, Louisville
- Kevin Smith, Michigan State
- Steve Smith, Marist
- Dale Solomon, Virginia Tech
- Brook Steppe, Georgia Tech
- Steve Stipanovich, Missouri
- Jon Sundvold, Missouri
- Vince Taylor, Duke
- Corny Thompson, Connecticut
- LaSalle Thompson, Texas
- Linton Townes, James Madison
- Alford Turner, Southwestern Louisiana
- David Vann, Saint Mary's
- Matt Waldron, Pacific
- Phil Ward, UNC Charlotte
- Bryan Warrick, St. Joseph's
- Mark West, Old Dominion
- Terry White, Texas-El Paso
- Willie White, Tennessee-Chattanooga
- Mitchell Wiggins, Florida State
- Rob Williams, Houston
- Ronnie Williams, Florida
- Mike Wilson, Marquette
- Othell Wilson, Virginia
- Leon Wood, Cal State Fullerton
- Carlos Yates, George Mason
