= 1981–82 NCAA Division I men's basketball season =

Basketball season

- Preseason AP No. 1: North Carolina Tar Heels
- NCAA Tournament: 1982
- Tournament dates: March 11 – 29, 1982
- National Championship: Louisiana Superdome; New Orleans, Louisiana
- NCAA Champions: North Carolina Tar Heels
- Helms National Champions: North Carolina Tar Heels
- Other champions: Bradley Braves (NIT)
- Player of the Year (Naismith, Wooden): Ralph Sampson, Virginia Cavaliers
- Player of the Year (Helms): Ralph Sampson, Virginia Cavaliers; James Worthy, North Carolina Tar Heels

The 1981–82 NCAA Division I men's basketball season began on November 27, 1981, progressed through the regular season and conference tournaments, and concluded with the 1982 NCAA Division I men's basketball tournament championship game on March 29, 1982, at the Louisiana Superdome in New Orleans, Louisiana. The North Carolina Tar Heels won their second NCAA national championship with a 63–62 victory over the Georgetown Hoyas.

== Season headlines ==
- Eastern Illinois, Illinois–Chicago, Loyola (MD), Marist, Maryland–Eastern Shore, Texas–San Antonio, U.S. International, Utica, Western Illinois, Wisconsin–Green Bay and Youngstown State began Division I play.
- The ECAC Metro Conference began play, with 11 original members. It was renamed the Northeast Conference in 1988.
- The ECAC South Conference began conference play, with 11 original members. Although it had been founded in 1979, its members had played as independents until this season, taking part in the Eastern College Athletic Conference's postseason South region tournament for independents. The ECAC South Conference was renamed the Colonial Athletic Association in 1985 and the Coastal Athletic Association in 2023.
- The Metro Atlantic Athletic Conference began play, with six original members.
- Before a crowd of 7,300 people at Robertson Field House in Peoria, Illinois, on December 21, 1981, Cincinnati defeated Bradley 75–73 in seven overtimes in the longest game in NCAA Division I history.
- Texas Southern's Harry Kelly led the United States in scoring and had the highest single-game output with 51 points against Texas College.
- The NCAA tournament's national third-place game — which had pitted the two teams that lost in the semifinals against one another — was abolished. It had been part of the tournament from 1946 through 1981.
- The National Invitation Tournament's third-place game, in which the two teams that lost in the semifinals had played against one another, was abolished. It had been part of the NIT since the tournament was first held in 1938.
- For the first time CBS was awarded the television rights for the NCAA tournament.
- The selection show announcing the NCAA tournament bracket was televised live for the first time.
- Brent Musburger of CBS Sports became the first television sportscaster to refer to the NCAA tournament as "March Madness" on the air.
- John Thompson of Georgetown became the first African-American head coach to lead his team to the Final Four.
- Dean Smith won his first national championship as his North Carolina Tar Heels defeated the Georgetown Hoyas 63–62 in New Orleans, Louisiana. It was Smith's first win after three losses in the championship game – including losing the previous year to Indiana.
- Following the season, the University of San Francisco (USF) dropped its basketball program following a scandal involving All-American guard Quintin Dailey. In the process of pleading guilty to assaulting a female USF student, Dailey revealed that he had been paid $1000 per month by a Dons booster for a job he never showed up for. This, combined with other blemishes on the program, caused university president John Lo Schiavo to shut down the program. USF did not reinstate its basketball program until 1985.

== Major rule changes ==
Beginning in 1981–1982, the following rules changes were implemented:

- The jump ball was only used at the beginning of the game and at the start of each overtime. An alternating arrow was used to indicate possession in jump-ball situations during the game.
- All fouls charged to bench personnel were assessed to the head coach.
- To decrease stalling, two defensive players are required to enter the mid-court area and "continuously and aggressively" attempt to gain control of the ball.
- Causing a backboard to vibrate during a shot or tap is a technical foul.
- Purposely faking a free throw is a violation.
- During free throw attempts, the free throw shooter and any players not in a marked space around the lane are not allowed to enter the lane until the ball touches either the rim or backboard.
- "Break-away" rims, implemented by the NBA after the Darryl Dawkins backboard-shattering dunks, are now permitted.

== Season outlook ==
=== Pre-season polls ===
The top 20 from the AP Poll during the pre-season.

Associated Press
Ranking	Team
1	North Carolina (25)
2	UCLA (20)
3	Kentucky (8)
4	Louisville (4)
5	Georgetown (2)
6	Wichita State
7	Virginia
8	DePaul
9	Iowa
10	Minnesota
11	Tulsa
12	Indiana (1)
13	Wake Forest
14	Alabama-Birmingham
15	Missouri
16	Georgia
17	Louisiana State
18	Arkansas (1)
19	Notre Dame
20	Alabama

UPI Coaches
Ranking	Team
1	North Carolina
2	UCLA
3	Kentucky
4	Louisville
5	Georgetown
6	Virginia
7	Wichita State
8	Iowa
9	DePaul
10	Minnesota
11	Indiana
12	Tulsa
13	Georgia
14	Wake Forest
15	Missouri
16	San Francisco
17	Alabama-Birmingham
18	Louisiana State
19	Arkansas
20	UNLV

== Conference membership changes ==
School	Former conference	New conference
Army Cadets	Division I independent	Metro Atlantic Athletic Conference
Baltimore Super Bees	Division I independent	ECAC Metro Conference
Catholic Cardinals	Division I independent	Old Dominion Athletic Conference (Division III)
East Carolina Pirates	Division I independent	ECAC South Conference
Eastern Illinois Panthers	Division II independent	Division I independent
Fairfield Stags	Division I independent	Metro Atlantic Athletic Conference
Fairleigh Dickinson Knights	Division I independent	ECAC Metro Conference
Fordham Rams	Division I independent	Metro Atlantic Athletic Conference
George Mason Patriots	Division I independent	ECAC South Conference
Georgia State Panthers	Sun Belt Conference	Division I independent
Illinois-Chicago Flames	CCAC (NAIA)	Division I independent
Illinois State Redbirds	Division I independent	Missouri Valley Conference
Iona Gaels	Division I independent	Metro Atlantic Athletic Conference
James Madison Dukes	Division I independent	ECAC South Conference
Long Island Blackbirds	Division I independent	ECAC Metro Conference
Loyola (Md.) Greyhounds	Division II independent	ECAC Metro Conference
Manhattan Jaspers	Division I independent	Metro Atlantic Athletic Conference
Marist Red Foxes	Big Apple Conference (Division II)	ECAC Metro Conference
Maryland Eastern Shore Hawks	Division II independent	Mid-Eastern Athletic Conference
Navy Midshipmen	Division I independent	ECAC South Conference
Old Dominion Monarchs	Division I independent	ECAC South Conference
Portland State Vikings	Division I independent	Discontinued basketball program
Richmond Spiders	Division I independent	ECAC South Conference
Robert Morris Colonials	Division I independent	ECAC Metro Conference
St. Francis (N.Y.) Terriers	Division I independent	ECAC Metro Conference
St. Francis (Pa.) Red Flash	Division I independent	ECAC Metro Conference
Saint Peter's Peacocks	Division I independent	Metro Atlantic Athletic Conference
Siena Saints	Division I independent	ECAC Metro Conference
Texas–San Antonio Roadrunners	No program	Division I independent
Towson State Tigers	Division I independent	ECAC Metro Conference
U.S. International Gulls	Division II independent	Division I independent
Utica Pioneers	Non-Division I	Division I independent
Wagner Seahawks	Division I independent	ECAC Metro Conference
Western Illinois Leathernecks	Division II independent	Division I independent
William & Mary Indians	Division I independent	ECAC South Conference
Wisconsin–Green Bay Phoenix	Division II independent	Division I independent
Youngstown State Penguins	Division II independent	Ohio Valley Conference

NOTE: Although the ECAC South Conference was founded in 1979, its members played as independents until conference play began this season. Catholic University left the ECAC South Conference before conference play began.

== New arenas ==
Georgetown, which had used on-campus McDonough Gymnasium as its home court since the 1951–52 season, moved off campus to Capital Centre (later known as USAir Arena and USAirways Arena) in Landover, Maryland. Although they would continue to play occasional home games at McDonough Gymnasium, the Hoyas would use Capital Centre as their home court until early in the 1997–98 season. In its first game at Capital Centre, Georgetown defeated San Diego State 71–53 before a crowd of 8,302 on December 5, 1981.

== Regular season ==
=== Conferences ===
==== Conference winners and tournaments ====
Conference	Regular season winner	Conference player of the year	Conference tournament	Tournament venue (City)	Tournament winner
Atlantic Coast Conference	North Carolina & Virginia	Ralph Sampson, Virginia	1982 ACC men's basketball tournament	Greensboro Coliseum (Greensboro, North Carolina)	North Carolina
Big East Conference	Villanova	Dan Callandrillo, Seton Hall	1982 Big East men's basketball tournament	Hartford Civic Center (Hartford, Connecticut)	Georgetown
Big Eight Conference	Missouri	Ricky Frazier, Missouri	1982 Big Eight Conference men's basketball tournament	Kemper Arena (Kansas City, Missouri) (Semifinals and Finals)	Missouri
Big Sky Conference	Idaho	Ken Owens, Idaho	1982 Big Sky Conference men's basketball tournament	Kibbie Dome (Moscow, Idaho)	Idaho
Big Ten Conference	Minnesota	None Selected	no tournament		
East Coast Conference	Temple (East); West Chester (West)	Granger Hall, Temple & Mark Nickens, American	1982 East Coast Conference men's basketball tournament	The Palestra (Philadelphia, Pennsylvania)	St. Joseph's
Eastern Athletic Association (Eastern 8)	West Virginia	Greg Jones, West Virginia	1982 Eastern 8 men's basketball tournament	Civic Arena (Pittsburgh, Pennsylvania)	Pittsburgh
ECAC Metro	Fairleigh Dickinson (North); Robert Morris (South)	Not awarded	1982 ECAC Metro men's basketball tournament	Campus sites; final held at Schwartz Athletic Center (Brooklyn, New York)	Robert Morris
ECAC North	Northeastern	Perry Moss, Northeastern	1982 ECAC North men's basketball tournament	Matthews Arena (Boston, Massachusetts)	Northeastern
ECAC South	James Madison	Not awarded	1982 ECAC South men's basketball tournament	Norfolk Scope (Norfolk, Virginia)	Old Dominion
Ivy League	Penn	Paul Little, Penn & Craig Robinson, Princeton	no tournament		
Metro Atlantic Athletic Conference	St. Peter's	William Brown, St. Peter's	1982 MAAC men's basketball tournament	Meadowlands Arena (East Rutherford, New Jersey)	Iona
Metro Conference	Memphis State	Keith Lee, Memphis State	1982 Metro Conference men's basketball tournament	Mid-South Coliseum (Memphis, Tennessee)	Memphis State
Mid-American Conference	Ball State	Mel McLaughlin, Central Michigan	1982 MAC men's basketball tournament	Crisler Arena (Ann Arbor, Michigan)	Northern Illinois
Mid-Eastern Athletic Conference	North Carolina A&T	Joe Binion, North Carolina A&T	1982 MEAC men's basketball tournament	Lawrence Joel Veterans Memorial Coliseum (Winston-Salem, North Carolina)	North Carolina A&T
Midwestern City Conference	Evansville	Wayne Sappleton, Loyola (Chicago)	1982 Midwestern City Conference men's basketball tournament	Mabee Center (Tulsa, Oklahoma)	Evansville
Missouri Valley Conference	Bradley	Paul Pressey, Tulsa	1982 Missouri Valley Conference men's basketball tournament	Tulsa Convention Center (Tulsa, Oklahoma)	Tulsa
Ohio Valley Conference	Murray State & Western Kentucky	Jerry Beck, Middle Tennessee State	1982 Ohio Valley Conference men's basketball tournament	E. A. Diddle Arena (Bowling Green, Kentucky)	Middle Tennessee State
Pacific-10 Conference	Oregon State	Lester Conner, Oregon State	no tournament		
Pacific Coast Athletic Association	Fresno State	Kevin Magee, UC Irvine	1981 Pacific Coast Athletic Association men's basketball tournament	Anaheim Convention Center (Anaheim, California)	Fresno State
Southeastern Conference	Kentucky & Tennessee	Dale Ellis, Tennessee	1982 SEC men's basketball tournament	Rupp Arena (Lexington, Kentucky)	Alabama
Southern Conference	Tennessee-Chattanooga	Willie White, Tennessee-Chattanooga	1982 Southern Conference men's basketball tournament	Charleston Civic Center (Charleston, West Virginia)	Tennessee-Chattanooga
Southland Conference	Southwestern Louisiana	Albert Culton, Texas-Arlington	1982 Southland Conference men's basketball tournament	Blackham Coliseum (Lafayette, Louisiana)	Southwestern Louisiana
Southwest Conference	Arkansas	Ricky Pierce, Rice	1982 Southwest Conference men's basketball tournament	Reunion Arena (Dallas, Texas)	Arkansas
Southwestern Athletic Conference	Alcorn State & Jackson State	Harry Kelly, Texas Southern	1982 SWAC men's basketball tournament		Alcorn State
Sun Belt Conference	UAB	Oliver Robinson, UAB	1982 Sun Belt Conference men's basketball tournament	Birmingham-Jefferson Convention Complex (Birmingham, Alabama)	UAB
Trans America Athletic Conference	Arkansas-Little Rock	Willie Jackson, Centenary	1982 TAAC men's basketball tournament	Ewing Coliseum (Monroe, Louisiana)	Northeast Louisiana Louisiana
West Coast Athletic Conference	Pepperdine	Quintin Dailey, San Francisco	no tournament		
Western Athletic Conference	Wyoming	Bill Garnett, Wyoming	no tournament		

==== Conference standings ====
Atlantic Coast Conference
	Conf			Overall		
Team	W	L	Pct	W	L	Pct
No. 1 North Carolina	12	2	.857	32	2	.941
No. 3 Virginia	12	2	.857	30	4	.882
No. 18 Wake Forest	9	5	.643	21	9	.700
North Carolina State	7	7	.500	22	10	.688
Maryland	5	9	.357	16	13	.552
Clemson	4	10	.286	14	14	.500
Duke	4	10	.286	10	17	.370
Georgia Tech	3	11	.214	10	16	.385

Big East Conference
	Conf			Overall		
Team	W	L	Pct	W	L	Pct
Villanova	11	3	.786	24	8	.750
No. 6 Georgetown	10	4	.714	30	7	.811
St. John's	9	5	.643	21	9	.700
Boston College	8	6	.571	22	10	.688
Connecticut	7	7	.500	17	11	.607
Syracuse	7	7	.500	16	13	.552
Seton Hall	2	12	.143	11	16	.407
Providence	2	12	.143	10	17	.370

Big Eight Conference
	Conf			Overall		
Team	W	L	Pct	W	L	Pct
No. 5 Missouri	12	2	.857	27	4	.871
Kansas State	10	4	.714	23	8	.742
Oklahoma	8	6	.571	22	11	.667
Nebraska	7	7	.500	16	12	.571
Oklahoma State	7	7	.500	15	12	.556
Iowa State	5	9	.357	10	17	.370
Kansas	4	10	.286	13	14	.481
Colorado	3	11	.214	11	16	.407

Big Sky Conference
	Conf			Overall		
Team	W	L	Pct	W	L	Pct
No. 8 Idaho	13	1	.929	27	3	.900
Montana	10	4	.714	17	10	.630
Nevada-Reno	9	5	.643	19	9	.679
Weber State	6	8	.429	15	13	.536
Boise State	6	8	.429	12	14	.462
Idaho State	5	9	.357	14	12	.538
Montana State	5	9	.357	11	18	.379
Northern Arizona	2	12	.143	6	20	.231

Big Ten Conference
	Conf			Overall		
Team	W	L	Pct	W	L	Pct
No. 7 Minnesota	14	4	.778	23	6	.793
No. 16 Iowa	12	6	.667	21	8	.724
Ohio State	12	6	.667	21	10	.677
Indiana	12	6	.667	19	10	.655
Purdue	11	7	.611	18	14	.563
Illinois	10	8	.556	18	11	.621
Michigan State	7	11	.389	11	17	.393
Michigan	7	11	.389	7	20	.259
Northwestern	5	13	.278	8	19	.296
Wisconsin	3	15	.167	6	21	.222

East Coast Conference
	Conf			Overall		
Team	W	L	Pct	W	L	Pct
East
Temple	11	0	1.000	19	8	.704
Saint Joseph's	10	1	.909	25	5	.833
American	8	3	.727	21	9	.700
Drexel	7	4	.636	19	11	.633
La Salle	7	4	.636	16	13	.552
Hofstra	4	7	.364	12	16	.429
West
West Chester	8	8	.500	13	14	.481
Lafayette	7	9	.438	12	15	.444
Rider	7	9	.438	11	16	.407
Delaware	6	10	.375	9	17	.346
Lehigh	3	13	.188	9	17	.346
Bucknell	3	13	.188	7	20	.259

ECAC Metro Conference
	Conf			Overall		
Team	W	L	Pct	W	L	Pct
North
Fairleigh Dickinson	12	3	.800	16	11	.593
Long Island	11	4	.733	20	10	.667
Siena	8	7	.533	15	13	.536
St. Francis (NY)	8	7	.533	10	17	.370
Marist	6	9	.400	12	14	.462
Wagner	1	14	.067	4	22	.154
South
Robert Morris	9	5	.643	17	13	.567
Baltimore	8	6	.571	15	13	.536
Loyola (MD)	7	7	.500	11	16	.407
Towson State	7	7	.500	10	17	.370
Saint Francis (PA)	3	11	.214	6	20	.231

ECAC North Conference
	Conf			Overall		
Team	W	L	Pct	W	L	Pct
Northeastern	8	1	.889	23	7	.767
Canisius	7	2	.778	19	8	.704
Niagara	7	2	.778	19	10	.655
Boston University	6	2	.750	19	9	.679
Holy Cross	4	4	.500	16	11	.593
Maine	3	7	.300	7	19	.269
Vermont	2	8	.200	10	16	.385
Colgate	2	8	.200	8	17	.320
New Hampshire	2	9	.182	9	18	.333

ECAC South Conference
	Conf			Overall		
Team	W	L	Pct	W	L	Pct
James Madison	10	1	.909	24	6	.800
Richmond	6	4	.600	18	11	.621
Old Dominion	5	4	.556	18	12	.600
William & Mary	6	5	.545	16	12	.556
Navy	2	4	.333	12	14	.462
George Mason	2	6	.250	13	14	.481
East Carolina	2	8	.200	10	17	.370

Eastern Athletic Association
	Conf			Overall		
Team	W	L	Pct	W	L	Pct
No. 14 West Virginia	13	1	.929	27	4	.871
Rutgers	9	5	.643	20	10	.667
Pittsburgh	8	6	.571	20	10	.667
St. Bonaventure	7	7	.500	14	14	.500
George Washington	7	7	.500	13	14	.481
Duquesne	5	9	.357	11	16	.407
Rhode Island	4	10	.286	10	17	.370
Massachusetts	3	11	.214	7	20	.259

Ivy League
	Conf			Overall		
Team	W	L	Pct	W	L	Pct
Penn	12	2	.857	17	10	.630
Columbia	9	5	.643	16	10	.615
Princeton	9	5	.643	13	13	.500
Yale	7	7	.500	13	13	.500
Cornell	7	7	.500	10	16	.385
Harvard	6	8	.429	11	15	.423
Brown	5	9	.357	5	21	.192
Dartmouth	1	13	.071	7	19	.269

Metro Conference
	Conf			Overall		
Team	W	L	Pct	W	L	Pct
No. 9 Memphis State	10	2	.833	24	5	.828
No. 20 Louisville	8	4	.667	23	10	.697
Tulane	8	4	.667	19	9	.679
Virginia Tech	7	5	.583	20	11	.645
Cincinnati	4	8	.333	15	12	.556
Florida State	4	8	.333	11	17	.393
Saint Louis	1	11	.083	6	21	.222

Metro Atlantic Conference
	Conf			Overall		
Team	W	L	Pct	W	L	Pct
Saint Peter's	9	1	.900	20	9	.828
Fordham	8	2	.800	18	11	.621
Iona	7	3	.700	24	9	.727
Manhattan	3	7	.300	11	16	.407
Fairfield	3	7	.300	11	18	.379
Army	0	10	.000	6	21	.222

Mid-American Conference
	Conf			Overall		
Team	W	L	Pct	W	L	Pct
Ball State	12	4	.750	17	11	.607
Bowling Green	10	6	.625	18	11	.621
Northern Illinois	9	7	.563	16	14	.533
Eastern Michigan	8	8	.500	15	12	.556
Western Michigan	8	8	.500	15	14	.517
Ohio	8	8	.500	13	14	.481
Miami (OH)	8	8	.500	11	16	.407
Toledo	7	9	.438	15	11	.577
Kent State	6	10	.375	10	16	.385
Central Michigan	4	12	.250	10	16	.385

Mid-Eastern Athletic Conference
	Conf			Overall		
Team	W	L	Pct	W	L	Pct
North Carolina A&T	10	2	.833	19	9	.679
Howard	9	3	.750	17	11	.607
South Carolina State	7	5	.583	10	15	.400
Florida A&M	5	7	.417	10	17	.370
Delaware State	4	8	.333	13	13	.500
Bethune-Cookman	4	8	.333	10	18	.357
Maryland-Eastern Shore	3	9	.250	6	20	.231

Midwestern City Conference
	Conf			Overall		
Team	W	L	Pct	W	L	Pct
Evansville	10	2	.833	23	6	.793
Oral Roberts	8	4	.667	18	12	.600
Loyola-Chicago	8	4	.667	17	12	.586
Oklahoma City	6	6	.500	14	14	.500
Detroit	6	6	.500	10	17	.370
Butler	3	9	.250	7	20	.259
Xavier	1	11	.083	8	20	.286

Missouri Valley Conference
	Conf			Overall		
Team	W	L	Pct	W	L	Pct
Bradley	13	3	.813	26	10	.722
No. 10 Tulsa	12	4	.750	24	6	.800
Wichita State	12	4	.750	23	6	.793
New Mexico State	10	6	.625	17	11	.607
Illinois State	9	7	.563	17	12	.586
Drake	7	9	.438	12	15	.444
Southern Illinois	7	9	.438	11	16	.407
Creighton	4	12	.250	7	20	.259
West Texas State	3	13	.188	11	15	.423
Indiana State	2	14	.125	9	18	.333

Ohio Valley Conference
	Conf			Overall		
Team	W	L	Pct	W	L	Pct
Murray State	13	3	.813	20	8	.714
Western Kentucky	13	3	.813	19	10	.655
Middle Tennessee State	12	4	.750	22	8	.733
Morehead State	11	5	.688	17	10	.630
Tennessee Tech	8	8	.500	12	14	.462
Youngstown State	5	11	.313	8	18	.308
Austin Peay	4	12	.250	6	20	.231
Akron	3	13	.188	7	19	.269
Eastern Kentucky	3	13	.188	5	21	.192

Pacific Coast Athletic Association
	Conf			Overall		
Team	W	L	Pct	W	L	Pct
No. 11 Fresno State	13	1	.929	27	3	.900
UC Irvine	10	4	.714	23	7	.767
Cal State Fullerton	9	5	.643	18	14	.563
San Jose State	7	7	.500	13	13	.500
Long Beach State	7	7	.500	12	16	.429
UC Santa Barbara	5	9	.357	10	16	.385
Pacific	3	11	.214	7	20	.259
Utah State	2	12	.143	4	23	.148

Pacific-10 Conference
	Conf			Overall		
Team	W	L	Pct	W	L	Pct
No. 4 Oregon State	16	2	.889	25	5	.833
No. 19 UCLA	14	4	.778	21	6	.778
Southern California	13	5	.722	19	9	.679
Washington	11	7	.611	19	10	.655
Washington State	10	8	.556	16	14	.533
California	8	10	.444	14	13	.519
Arizona State	8	10	.444	13	14	.481
Arizona	4	14	.222	9	18	.333
Oregon	4	14	.222	9	18	.333
Stanford	2	16	.111	7	20	.259

Southeastern Conference
	Conf			Overall		
Team	W	L	Pct	W	L	Pct
No. 15 Kentucky	13	5	.722	22	8	.733
Tennessee	13	5	.722	20	10	.667
No. 13 Alabama	12	6	.667	24	7	.774
Mississippi	11	7	.611	18	12	.600
LSU	11	7	.611	14	14	.500
Georgia	10	8	.556	19	12	.613
Vanderbilt	7	11	.389	15	13	.536
Auburn	7	11	.389	14	14	.500
Mississippi State	4	14	.222	8	19	.296
Florida	2	16	.111	5	22	.185

Southern Conference
	Conf			Overall		
Team	W	L	Pct	W	L	Pct
Tennessee-Chattanooga	15	1	.938	27	4	.871
Western Carolina	11	5	.688	19	8	.704
Davidson	9	7	.563	14	15	.483
Marshall	8	8	.500	16	11	.593
East Tennessee State	8	8	.500	13	15	.464
The Citadel	7	9	.438	14	14	.500
Furman	7	9	.438	11	16	.407
Appalachian State	6	10	.375	11	15	.423
VMI	1	15	.063	1	25	.038

Southland Conference
	Conf			Overall		
Team	W	L	Pct	W	L	Pct
Southwest Louisiana	8	2	.800	24	8	.750
Lamar	7	3	.700	22	7	.759
Texas-Arlington	6	4	.600	16	12	.571
McNeese State	4	6	.400	14	15	.483
Arkansas State	3	7	.300	15	11	.577
Louisiana Tech	2	8	.200	11	16	.407

Southwest Conference
	Conf			Overall		
Team	W	L	Pct	W	L	Pct
No. 12 Arkansas	12	4	.750	23	6	.793
Houston	11	5	.688	25	8	.758
Texas A&M	10	6	.625	20	11	.645
Baylor	9	7	.563	17	11	.607
Texas Christian	9	7	.563	16	13	.552
Texas Tech	8	8	.500	17	11	.607
Texas	6	10	.375	16	11	.593
Rice	6	10	.375	15	15	.500
SMU	1	15	.063	6	21	.222

Southwestern Athletic Conference
	Conf			Overall		
Team	W	L	Pct	W	L	Pct
Alcorn State	10	2	.833	22	8	.733
Jackson State	10	2	.833	19	9	.679
Texas Southern	8	4	.667	21	8	.724
Grambling	8	4	.667	12	17	.414
Mississippi Valley State	4	8	.333	6	20	.231
Southern	3	9	.250	7	18	.280
Prairie View A&M	1	11	.083	2	23	.080

Sun Belt Conference
	Conf			Overall		
Team	W	L	Pct	W	L	Pct
No. 17 UAB	9	1	.900	25	6	.806
VCU	7	3	.700	17	11	.607
Jacksonville	5	5	.500	14	13	.519
South Florida	4	6	.400	17	11	.607
UNC Charlotte	3	7	.300	15	12	.556
South Alabama	2	8	.200	12	16	.429

Trans America Athletic Conference
	Conf			Overall		
Team	W	L	Pct	W	L	Pct
Arkansas-Little Rock	12	4	.750	19	8	.704
Northwestern State	10	6	.625	19	9	.679
Northeast Louisiana	9	7	.563	19	11	.633
Centenary	9	7	.563	17	12	.586
Mercer	8	8	.500	16	11	.593
Georgia Southern	8	8	.500	14	13	.519
Houston Baptist	8	8	.500	13	14	.481
Samford	6	10	.375	11	15	.423
Hardin–Simmons	2	14	.125	6	20	.231

West Coast Athletic Conference
	Conf			Overall		
Team	W	L	Pct	W	L	Pct
Pepperdine	14	0	1.000	22	7	.759
San Francisco	11	3	.786	25	6	.806
Portland	9	5	.643	17	10	.630
Santa Clara	7	7	.500	16	11	.593
Gonzaga	7	7	.500	15	12	.556
San Diego	4	10	.286	11	15	.423
Saint Mary's	3	11	.214	11	16	.407
Loyola-Marymount	1	13	.071	3	24	.111

Western Athletic Conference
	Conf			Overall		
Team	W	L	Pct	W	L	Pct
Wyoming	14	2	.875	23	7	.767
UTEP	11	5	.688	20	8	.714
San Diego State	11	5	.688	20	9	.690
Hawaii	9	7	.563	17	10	.630
BYU	9	7	.563	17	13	.567
New Mexico	7	9	.438	14	14	.500
Utah	6	10	.375	11	17	.393
Air Force	3	13	.188	8	19	.296
Colorado State	2	14	.125	8	19	.296

===== Conference standings key =====
Team won the conference tournament and the automatic bid to the NCAA tournament
Conference did not have conference tournament, so team received an automatic bid to the NCAA tournament for finishing in first
Team received at-large bid to NCAA tournament
Rankings from AP Poll.

=== Division I independents ===
A total of 29 college teams played as Division I independents. Among them, DePaul (26–2) had both the best winning percentage (.929) and the most wins.

Division I Independents
Team	W	L	Pct
No. 2 DePaul	26	2	.929
Marquette	23	9	.719
Dayton	21	9	.700
New Orleans	18	8	.692
UNLV	20	10	.667
Cleveland State	17	10	.630
Southeastern Louisiana	16	11	.593
Southern Mississippi	15	11	.577
North Texas State	15	12	.556
Penn State	15	12	.556
Tennessee State	13	12	.520
Eastern Illinois	14	13	.519
Illinois-Chicago	14	13	.519
Western Illinois	14	13	.519
Wisconsin-Green Bay	14	13	.519
Baptist	13	13	.500
South Carolina	14	15	.483
UNC Wilmington	13	14	.481
Northern Iowa	12	15	.444
Stetson	12	15	.444
Campbell	11	16	.407
Notre Dame	10	17	.370
US International	9	18	.333
Valparaiso	9	18	.333
Texas-San Antonio	8	19	.296
Nicholls State	6	20	.231
Texas-Pan American	5	20	.200
Utica	4	22	.154
Georgia State	4	23	.148

==== Independents key ====
Team received at-large bid to NCAA tournament
Rankings from AP Poll.

=== Informal championships ===
Conference	Regular season winner	Most Valuable Player
Philadelphia Big 5	Saint Joseph's & Temple	Jeffery Clark, Saint Joseph's, & John Pinone, Villanova

Saint Joseph's and Temple both finished with records of 3–1 in head-to-head competition among the Philadelphia Big 5.

=== Statistical leaders ===
Points per game			Rebounds per game			Field-goal percentage			Free-throw percentage		
Player	School	PPG	Player	School	RPG	Player	School	FG%	Player	School	FT%
Harry Kelly	TX Southern	29.7	LaSalle Thompson	Texas	13.5	Mark McNamara	California	70.2	Rod Foster	UCLA	95.0
Ricky Pierce	Rice	26.8	Wayne Sappleton	Loyola (IL)	13.0	Dale Ellis	Tennessee	65.4	Jack Moore	Nebraska	93.9
Dan Callandrillo	Seton Hall	25.9	Darren Tillis	Cleveland St.	12.8	Orlando Phillips	Pepperdine	64.6	Joe Dykstra	W. Illinois	91.3
Kevin Magee	UC Irvine	25.2	Mark McNamara	California	12.6	Albert Culton	TX-Arlington	64.3	Byron Williams	Idaho St.	89.7
Quintin Dailey	San Francisco	25.2	Riley Clarida	LIU	12.3	Kevin Magee	UC Irvine	64.2	Jim Master	Kentucky	89.6

== Postseason tournaments ==
=== NCAA tournament ===
North Carolina freshman Michael Jordan hit the game-winning shot as Dean Smith won his first national championship after many near-misses over his career, defeating the Georgetown Hoyas 63–62 at the Louisiana Superdome in New Orleans. Fred Brown's errant pass to James Worthy in the closing seconds sealed the game, which featured star freshmen Jordan and the Hoyas' Patrick Ewing. Worthy was named Final Four Most Outstanding Player.

==== Final Four – Louisiana Superdome, New Orleans ====
National semifinals
E1	North Carolina	68
MW6	Houston	63
ME3	Louisville	46
W1	Georgetown	50

National championship game
E1	North Carolina	63
W1	Georgetown	62

=== National Invitation tournament ===
The Bradley Braves, led by coach Dick Versace, defeated the Purdue Boilermakers 67–58 to win their fourth National Invitation tournament, tying them with St. John's for the most NIT championships (St. John's has since won two additional titles). Bradley's Mitchell Anderson was named NIT Most Valuable Player.

==== NIT Semifinals and Final ====
Played at Madison Square Garden in New York City

Semifinals
Oklahoma	68
Bradley	84
Georgia	60
Purdue	61

Final
Bradley	67
Purdue	58

== Awards ==
=== Consensus All-American teams ===
Consensus First Team
Player	Position	Class	Team
Terry Cummings	F	Junior	DePaul
Quintin Dailey	G	Junior	San Francisco
Eric Floyd	G	Senior	Georgetown
Ralph Sampson	C	Junior	Virginia
James Worthy	F	Junior	North Carolina

Consensus Second Team
Player	Position	Class	Team
Dale Ellis	F	Junior	Tennessee
Kevin Magee	F	Senior	UC Irvine
John Paxson	G	Junior	Notre Dame
Sam Perkins	F/C	Sophomore	North Carolina
Paul Pressey	F/G	Senior	Tulsa

=== Major player of the year awards ===
- Wooden Award: Ralph Sampson, Virginia
- Naismith Award: Ralph Sampson, Virginia
- Helms Player of the Year: Ralph Sampson, Virginia, & James Worthy, North Carolina
- Associated Press Player of the Year: Ralph Sampson, Virginia
- UPI Player of the Year: Ralph Sampson, Virginia
- NABC Player of the Year: Ralph Sampson, Virginia
- Oscar Robertson Trophy (USBWA): Ralph Sampson, Virginia
- Adolph Rupp Trophy: Ralph Sampson, Virginia
- Sporting News Player of the Year: Ralph Sampson, Virginia

=== Major coach of the year awards ===
- Associated Press Coach of the Year: Ralph Miller, Oregon State
- Henry Iba Award (USBWA): John Thompson, Georgetown
- NABC Coach of the Year: Don Monson, Idaho
- UPI Coach of the Year: Norm Stewart, Missouri
- CBS/Chevrolet Coach of the Year: Gene Keady, Purdue
- Sporting News Coach of the Year: Ralph Miller, Oregon State

=== Other major awards ===
- Frances Pomeroy Naismith Award (Best player under 6'0): Jack Moore, Nebraska
- Robert V. Geasey Trophy (Top player in Philadelphia Big 5): Jeffery Clark, St. Joseph's & John Pinone, Villanova
- NIT/Haggerty Award (Top player in New York City metro area): Dan Callandrillo, Seton Hall

== Coaching changes ==
A number of teams changed coaches throughout the season and after the season ended.

Team	Former Coach	Interim Coach	New Coach	Reason
American	Gary Williams		Ed Tapscott	
Arizona	Fred Snowden		Ben Lindsey	Snowden announced his resignation, effective at the end of the season, on January 8, 1982.
Arizona State	Ned Wulk		Bob Weinhauer	
Army	Pete Gaudet		Les Wothke	Gaudet took an assistant coaching position at Duke under his predecessor at Army, Mike Krzyzewski.
Ball State	Steve Yoder		Al Brown	
Boston College	Tom Davis		Gary Williams	When Dr. Tom Davis left BC, the Eagles replaced him with former Davis assistant Gary Williams.
Colgate	Mike Griffin		Tony Relvas	
Detroit	Willie McCarter		Don Sicko	
Duquesne	Mike Rice		Jim Satalin	
East Carolina	Dave Odom		Charlie Harrison	
East Tennessee State	Jim Hallahan		Barry Dowd	
Furman	Eddie Holbrook		Jene Davis	
Idaho State	Lynn Archibald		Wayne Ballard	
Indiana State	Bill Hodges		Dave Schellhase	
Kent State	Ed Douma		Jim McDonald	
Loyola (MD)	Bill Burke		Mark Amatucci	
Mississippi	Bob Weltlich		Lee Hunt	
Mississippi Valley State	Pop Gaines		Jerry Lewis	
Pacific	Dick Fichtner		Tom O'Neill	
Penn	Bob Weinhauer		Craig Littlepage	
Prairie View A&M	Calvin White		Jim Duplantier	
St. Bonaventure	Jim Satalin		Jim O'Brien	
Saint Louis	Ron Ekker		Rich Grawer	
Seton Hall	Bill Raftery	Hoddy Mahon	P. J. Carlesimo	After Raftery unexpectedly quit in November, long-time assistant Mahon was tapped as interim coach. After the season, Seton Hall hired Wagner's Carlesimo. Raftery never coached again, instead embarking on a long and highly successful career as a television analyst.
Siena	William Kirsch		John Griffin	
Stanford	Dick DiBiaso		Tom Davis	
Temple	Don Casey		John Chaney	Casey left to become an assistant for the Chicago Bulls. Temple hired successful Division II coach Chaney.
Texas	Abe Lemons		Bob Weltlich	Lemons was fired after a season that saw the Longhorns start 14–0, but derailed after forward Mike Wacker went down to injury.
Texas–Pan American	Bill White		Lon Kruger	The Broncs gave Kansas State assistant Kruger his first head coaching job.
UNC Charlotte	Mike Pratt		Hal Wissel	
VMI	Charlie Schmaus		Marty Fletcher	
Wagner	P. J. Carlesimo		Neil Kennett	
Western Michigan	Les Wothke		Vernon Payne	
Wisconsin	Bill Cofield		Steve Yoder	
Wisconsin-Green Bay	Dave Buss		Dick Lien	
Yale	Ray Carazo		Tom Brennan	
Youngstown State	Dom Roselli		Mike Rice	
