= List of 1984–85 NBA season transactions =

This is a list of all transactions occurring in the 1984-85 NBA season.

== Events ==
=== July ?, 1984 ===
- The San Antonio Spurs waived Brant Weidner.

=== July 10, 1984 ===
- The Kansas City Kings waived Dave Robisch.

=== July 11, 1984 ===
- The Atlanta Hawks signed Walker Russell as a free agent.

=== July 25, 1984 ===
- The Denver Nuggets waived Anthony Roberts.
- The Portland Trail Blazers signed Tom Scheffler as a free agent.

=== July 26, 1984 ===
- The Cleveland Cavaliers hired George Karl as head coach.

=== August ?, 1984 ===
- The New York Knicks signed Ron Cavenall as a free agent.

=== August 1, 1984 ===
- The New York Knicks signed Clinton Wheeler as a free agent.

=== August 3, 1984 ===
- The Denver Nuggets signed Elston Turner as a veteran free agent and sent Howard Carter to the Dallas Mavericks as compensation.

=== August 8, 1984 ===
- The Atlanta Hawks traded Johnny Davis to the Cleveland Cavaliers for John Garris and Stewart Granger.

=== August 10, 1984 ===
- The Houston Rockets traded Caldwell Jones to the Chicago Bulls for Mitchell Wiggins, a 1985 2nd round draft pick (Tyrone Corbin was later selected) and a 1985 3rd round draft pick (Michael Payne was later selected).

=== August 24, 1984 ===
- The New York Knicks waived Clinton Wheeler.

=== September ?, 1984 ===
- The Cleveland Cavaliers signed Dale Wilkinson as a free agent.
- The Utah Jazz waived Jim Rowinski.

=== September 7, 1984 ===
- The Golden State Warriors signed Chuck Aleksinas as a free agent.

=== September 9, 1984 ===
- The Golden State Warriors signed Peter Thibeaux as a free agent.

=== September 11, 1984 ===
- The San Antonio Spurs waived Charles Jones.

=== September 14, 1984 ===
- The Chicago Bulls traded Wallace Bryant to the Dallas Mavericks for a 1986 2nd round draft pick (Rafael Addison was later selected).
- The Philadelphia 76ers traded Leo Rautins to the Indiana Pacers for a 1987 3rd round draft pick (Hansi Gnad was later selected).

=== September 15, 1984 ===
- The Los Angeles Lakers signed Chuck Nevitt as a free agent.

=== September 17, 1984 ===
- The Indiana Pacers traded Kevin McKenna to the Houston Rockets for a 1985 5th round draft pick (Ivan Daniels was later selected).

=== September 20, 1984 ===
- The Chicago Bulls signed Charles Jones as a free agent.

=== September 21, 1984 ===
- The Seattle SuperSonics signed John Schweitz as a free agent.

=== September 23, 1984 ===
- The Seattle SuperSonics signed Frank Brickowski as a free agent.

=== September 24, 1984 ===
- Bob Lanier retired from the Milwaukee Bucks
- The Phoenix Suns signed Mike Holton as a free agent.
- The Seattle SuperSonics waived Steve Hayes.

=== September 25, 1984 ===
- The Washington Bullets traded Bryan Warrick to the Los Angeles Clippers for a 1985 3rd round draft pick (Ken Perry was later selected).

=== September 26, 1984 ===
- The Portland Trail Blazers waived Tom Piotrowski.
- The Houston Rockets signed Lionel Hollins as a veteran free agent.

=== September 27, 1984 ===
- The Washington Bullets signed Dudley Bradley as a free agent.
- The New Jersey Nets signed George Johnson as a veteran free agent.
- The Cleveland Cavaliers signed Robert Smith as a free agent.
- The Chicago Bulls signed Dirk Minniefield as a free agent.

=== September 28, 1984 ===
- The Utah Jazz signed Billy Paultz as a veteran free agent and sent a 1985 3rd round draft pick (Sedric Toney was later selected) to the Atlanta Hawks as compensation.
- The Detroit Pistons signed Bobby Cattage as a free agent.

The Indiana Pacers signed Tony Brown as a free agent.

=== September 29, 1984 ===
- The New York Knicks traded Campy Russell to the Cleveland Cavaliers for a 1985 2nd round draft pick. The 2nd round draft pick was contingent upon Russell being on Cleveland's roster on December 1, 1984, but he was waived on November 5, 1984.
- The Milwaukee Bucks traded Junior Bridgeman, Harvey Catchings, Marques Johnson and cash to the Los Angeles Clippers for Terry Cummings, Craig Hodges and Ricky Pierce.

=== October 4, 1984 ===
- The Houston Rockets traded James Bailey and a 1985 2nd round draft pick (Tyrone Corbin was later selected) to the San Antonio Spurs for John Lucas and a 1985 3rd round draft pick (Sam Mitchell was later selected).
- The Indiana Pacers waived Sidney Lowe.

=== October 8, 1984 ===
- The Detroit Pistons waived Jerome Henderson.
- The Kansas City Kings waived Carl Henry.

=== October 10, 1984 ===
- The Philadelphia 76ers waived Butch Graves.
- The Phoenix Suns waived Michael Young.

=== October 11, 1984 ===
- The Utah Jazz waived Jerry Eaves.

=== October 12, 1984 ===
- The Detroit Pistons signed Sidney Lowe as a free agent.
- The Milwaukee Bucks signed Butch Graves as a free agent.

=== October 15, 1984 ===
- The Atlanta Hawks signed Leo Rautins as a free agent.
- The Atlanta Hawks signed Jerry Eaves as a free agent.
- The Kansas City Kings waived Larry Micheaux.
- The Indiana Pacers waived Brook Steppe.
- The Golden State Warriors waived Pace Mannion.
- The San Antonio Spurs waived Joe Binion.

=== October 16, 1984 ===
- The Boston Celtics traded Gerald Henderson to the Seattle SuperSonics for a 1986 1st round draft pick (Len Bias was later selected).

=== October 17, 1984 ===
- The Milwaukee Bucks signed Larry Micheaux as a free agent.

=== October 18, 1984 ===
- The Detroit Pistons waived Bobby Cattage.

=== October 19, 1984 ===
- The Indiana Pacers traded Butch Carter to the New York Knicks for a 1985 2nd round draft pick (Dwayne McClain was later selected).

=== October 22, 1984 ===
- The Dallas Mavericks traded Bill Garnett and Terence Stansbury to the Indiana Pacers for a 1990 1st round draft pick (Travis Mays was later selected).
- The Cleveland Cavaliers waived Dale Wilkinson.
- The Milwaukee Bucks waived Butch Graves.
- The Chicago Bulls waived Dirk Minniefield.

=== October 23, 1984 ===
- The Portland Trail Blazers waived Pete Verhoeven.
- The Dallas Mavericks waived Mark West.
- The Houston Rockets waived Major Jones.
- The Houston Rockets waived Terry Teagle.
- The Houston Rockets waived Kevin McKenna.
- The Golden State Warriors waived Chris Engler.
- The Golden State Warriors waived Don Collins.
- The Milwaukee Bucks waived McKinley Singleton.
- The Detroit Pistons waived Ray Tolbert.

=== October 24, 1984 ===
- The Detroit Pistons signed Dale Wilkinson as a free agent.
- The San Antonio Spurs traded James Bailey to the New York Knicks for a 1986 3rd round draft pick (Forrest McKenzie was later selected).
- The Utah Jazz waived David Pope.
- The Indiana Pacers waived Kenton Edelin.

=== October 25, 1984 ===
- The Washington Bullets waived Joe Kopicki.
- The Boston Celtics waived Michael Young.

=== October 26, 1984 ===
- The Chicago Bulls signed Wes Matthews as a free agent.

=== October 29, 1984 ===
- The Los Angeles Clippers traded Hank McDowell to the Houston Rockets for a 1985 3rd round draft pick (Ken Perry was later selected).

=== October 31, 1984 ===
- The Denver Nuggets signed Joe Kopicki as a free agent.
- The Atlanta Hawks waived Jerry Eaves.

=== November 2, 1984 ===
- The Kansas City Kings signed Pete Verhoeven as a free agent.

=== November 5, 1984 ===
- The Atlanta Hawks waived Leo Rautins.
- The Milwaukee Bucks waived Lorenzo Romar.
- The Cleveland Cavaliers waived Campy Russell.

=== November 6, 1984 ===
- The Milwaukee Bucks signed Mark West as a free agent.
- The Washington Bullets waived Charles Davis.
- The Los Angeles Lakers waived Chuck Nevitt.
- The Detroit Pistons waived Dale Wilkinson.

=== November 7, 1984 ===
- The Detroit Pistons signed Major Jones as a free agent.
- The Detroit Pistons signed Terry Teagle as a free agent.

=== November 8, 1984 ===
- The Detroit Pistons signed Lorenzo Romar as a free agent.
- The Utah Jazz waived Kenny Natt.

=== November 9, 1984 ===
- The Indiana Pacers waived Ralph Jackson.

=== November 11, 1984 ===
- The Milwaukee Bucks signed Charles Davis as a free agent.
- The Detroit Pistons waived Sidney Lowe.

=== November 12, 1984 ===
- The Milwaukee Bucks waived Mark West.

=== November 13, 1984 ===
- The Seattle SuperSonics waived Scooter McCray.

=== November 14, 1984 ===
- The New Jersey Nets signed Tom LaGarde as a free agent.

=== November 16, 1984 ===
- The Cleveland Cavaliers claimed Michael Wilson on waivers from the Washington Bullets.
- The Chicago Bulls waived Ronnie Lester.
- The Chicago Bulls waived Charles Jones.

=== November 18, 1984 ===
- Jack McKinney resigns as head coach for the Kansas City Kings.
- The Kansas City Kings hired Phil Johnson as head coach.

=== November 20, 1984 ===
- The Detroit Pistons waived Terry Teagle.

=== November 23, 1984 ===
- The Cleveland Cavaliers signed Mark West as a free agent.

=== November 24, 1984 ===
- The Detroit Pistons signed Brook Steppe as a free agent.

=== November 26, 1984 ===
- The Cleveland Cavaliers waived Robert Smith.

=== November 27, 1984 ===
- The Detroit Pistons waived Lorenzo Romar.
- The Phoenix Suns signed Michael Young as a free agent.

=== November 28, 1984 ===
- The Los Angeles Lakers signed Ronnie Lester as a free agent.
- The Atlanta Hawks signed Sidney Lowe as a free agent.

=== November 29, 1984 ===
- The Detroit Pistons waived David Thirdkill.

=== December 5, 1984 ===
- The San Antonio Spurs waived Ron Brewer.

=== December 6, 1984 ===
- The Kansas City Kings waived Dane Suttle.

=== December 7, 1984 ===
- The Cleveland Cavaliers waived Geoff Huston.

=== December 8, 1984 ===
- The Kansas City Kings signed David Pope as a free agent.

=== December 10, 1984 ===
- The Utah Jazz waived John Drew.
- The New Jersey Nets signed Kevin McKenna as a free agent.

=== December 11, 1984 ===
- The Kansas City Kings traded Billy Knight to the San Antonio Spurs for Mark McNamara.

=== December 14, 1984 ===
- The Cleveland Cavaliers traded Jeff Cook to the San Antonio Spurs for Edgar Jones and cash.
- The Kansas City Kings signed Kenny Natt as a free agent.
- The Cleveland Cavaliers waived Michael Wilson.

=== December 15, 1984 ===
- The Philadelphia 76ers signed George Johnson as a veteran free agent and sent a 1989 2nd round draft pick (Reggie Cross was later selected) to the Indiana Pacers as compensation.
- The Philadelphia 76ers traded Marc Iavaroni to the San Antonio Spurs for a 1986 3rd round draft pick (Keith Colbert was later selected).

=== December 17, 1984 ===
- The Dallas Mavericks waived Howard Carter.
- The Kansas City Kings waived Kenny Natt.
- The Milwaukee Bucks waived Larry Micheaux.

=== December 18, 1984 ===
- The Houston Rockets waived Phil Ford.
- The New Jersey Nets waived Tom LaGarde.
- The San Antonio Spurs traded Fred Roberts to the Utah Jazz for a 1986 2nd round draft pick (Lemone Lampley was later selected) and a 1988 2nd round draft pick (Jeff Moe was later selected).
- The Atlanta Hawks waived Sidney Lowe.
- The Atlanta Hawks waived Walker Russell.

=== December 19, 1984 ===
- The Kansas City Kings signed Kenny Natt to a 10-day contract.

=== December 20, 1984 ===
- The Atlanta Hawks signed Sidney Lowe to the first of two 10-day contracts.
- The Cleveland Cavaliers signed Kevin Williams as a free agent.

=== December 22, 1984 ===
- The New Jersey Nets signed Chris Engler as a free agent.
- The Utah Jazz signed Pace Mannion as a free agent.

=== December 26, 1984 ===
- The New Jersey Nets signed Michael Wilson as a free agent.

=== December 28, 1984 ===
- The Houston Rockets signed Larry Micheaux as a free agent.

=== January 10, 1985 ===
- The Cleveland Cavaliers signed Butch Graves to the first of two 10-day contracts.
- The Indiana Pacers signed Kenton Edelin to a 10-day contract.

=== January 14, 1985 ===
- The Chicago Bulls signed Chris Engler to the first of two 10-day contracts.

=== February 12, 1985 ===
- The Milwaukee Bucks signed David Thirdkill to the first of two 10-day contracts.
- The Cleveland Cavaliers traded Paul Thompson to the Milwaukee Bucks for a 1985 2nd round draft pick (Hot Rod Williams was later selected) and a 1987 2nd round draft pick (Kannard Johnson was later selected).

=== February 14, 1985 ===
- The Washington Bullets signed Charles Jones as a free agent.
- The Atlanta Hawks waived Stewart Granger.

=== February 18, 1985 ===
- The Los Angeles Clippers signed Chris Engler to a 10-day contract.

=== February 21, 1985 ===
- The Boston Celtics signed Ray Williams as a veteran free agent and sent a 1985 2nd round draft pick (Gerald Wilkins was later selected) and a 1986 2nd round draft pick (Michael Jackson was later selected) to the New York Knicks as compensation.

=== February 27, 1985 ===
- The Kansas City Kings signed Ed Nealy as a free agent.

=== March 5, 1985 ===
- The Los Angeles Lakers signed Chuck Nevitt as a free agent.

=== March 6, 1985 ===
- The Milwaukee Bucks waived David Thirdkill.

=== March 8, 1985 ===
- The Los Angeles Clippers waived Bryan Warrick.

=== March 10, 1985 ===
- The Los Angeles Clippers signed Franklin Edwards as a veteran free agent.
- The Los Angeles Clippers signed Dale Wilkinson as a free agent.

=== March 11, 1985 ===
- The Golden State Warriors signed Terry Teagle as a free agent.

=== March 13, 1985 ===
- The Washington Bullets signed Don Collins as a free agent.

=== March 19, 1985 ===
- The Philadelphia 76ers signed Steve Hayes as a free agent.

=== March 21, 1985 ===
- The New Jersey Nets signed Ron Brewer as a free agent.

=== March 25, 1985 ===
- The Indiana Pacers signed Greg Kelser as a veteran free agent.

=== March 29, 1985 ===
- The Indiana Pacers signed Kenton Edelin as a free agent.

=== April 2, 1985 ===
- The Milwaukee Bucks signed Chris Engler as a free agent.

=== April 7, 1985 ===
- The Philadelphia 76ers waived Steve Hayes.

=== April 9, 1985 ===
- The San Antonio Spurs signed David Thirdkill as a free agent.

=== April 11, 1985 ===
- The Seattle SuperSonics signed Joe Cooper to a contract for the rest of the season.

=== April 12, 1985 ===
The San Antonio Spurs signed Linton Townes as a free agent.

=== April 25, 1985 ===
The Seattle SuperSonics fired Lenny Wilkens as head coach.

=== May 1, 1985 ===
- The Dallas Mavericks traded a 1985 1st round draft pick (Sam Vincent was later selected) to the Boston Celtics for a 1985 1st round draft pick (Terry Porter was later selected) and a 1988 2nd round draft pick (Jose Vargas was later selected).

The Washington Bullets waived Don Collins.

=== May 8, 1985 ===
- The Dallas Mavericks waived Tom Sluby.

=== May 23, 1985 ===
- The Utah Jazz signed Steve Hayes as a free agent.

=== May 25, 1985 ===
- The Chicago Bulls fired Kevin Loughery as head coach.

=== May 28, 1985 ===
- Billy Cunningham resigns as head coach for Philadelphia 76ers.

=== June 6, 1985 ===
- The Detroit Pistons signed Jerome Henderson as a free agent.

=== June 13, 1985 ===
- Stan Albeck resigns as head coach for the New Jersey Nets.

=== June 14, 1985 ===
- The Philadelphia 76ers hired Matt Guokas as head coach.
- The Portland Trail Blazers traded Bernard Thompson to the Phoenix Suns for a 1987 2nd round draft pick (Nikita Wilson was later selected).

=== June 17, 1985 ===
- The Chicago Bulls hired Stan Albeck as head coach.
- The Washington Bullets traded Greg Ballard to the Golden State Warriors for a 1985 2nd round draft pick (Manute Bol was later selected) and a 1987 2nd round draft pick (Duane Washington was later selected).
- The Washington Bullets traded Mike Gibson and Rick Mahorn to the Detroit Pistons for Dan Roundfield.

=== June 18, 1985 ===
- The San Antonio Spurs traded Gene Banks to the Chicago Bulls for Steve Johnson and a 1985 2nd round draft pick (Mike Brittain was later selected).
- The Chicago Bulls traded Keith Lee and Ennis Whatley to the Cleveland Cavaliers for Charles Oakley and Calvin Duncan.
- The Portland Trail Blazers traded Mike Smrek to the Chicago Bulls for Ben Coleman and Ken Johnson.

=== June 19, 1985 ===
- The San Antonio Spurs waived Billy Knight.

=== June 25, 1985 ===
- The Seattle SuperSonics hired Bernie Bickerstaff as head coach.
