= Dallas Mavericks draft history =

In their 46-year history, the Dallas Mavericks have selected the following players in the National Basketball Association draft.

== Key ==
Naismith Basketball Hall of Famer	First overall NBA draft pick	Selected for an NBA All-Star Game

== Draft selections ==
Year	Round	Pick	Player	Nationality	College/High School/Club
1980	1	11	Kiki Vandeweghe	United States	University of California, Los Angeles
1980	2	34	Roosevelt Bouie	United States	Syracuse University
1980	3	57	Dave Britton	United States	Texas A&M University
1980	4	80	Avery Klask	United States	Weber State University
1980	5	103	Darrell Allums	United States	UCLA
1980	6	126	Leroy Jackson	United States	Cameron University
1980	7	149	Tony Forch	United States	Midwestern State University
1980	8	169	Clarence Kea	United States	Lamar University
1980	9	189	Ken Williams	United States	University of Houston
1980	10	206	Tom Morgan	United States	California State University, Fullerton
1981	1	1	Mark Aguirre	United States	DePaul University
1981	1	9	Rolando Blackman	United States (Note: Rolando Blackman was born in Panama, but grew up in the United States and has represented the United States national team.)	Kansas State University
1981	2	24	Jay Vincent	United States	Michigan State University
1981	2	43	Elston Turner	United States	University of Mississippi
1981	3	47	Art Housey	United States	University of Kansas
1981	4	70	Eddie Moss	United States	Syracuse University
1981	5	93	Pete Budko	United States	University of North Carolina
1981	6	116	Karl Bakowski	United States	University of Utah
1981	7	139	Danny Davis	United States	UNC Wilmington
1981	8	162	David Kennedy	United States	University of Cincinnati
1981	9	184	John Hollinden	United States	Indiana State Evansville (Note: Granted independence from Indiana State University in 1985 and adopted the name University of Southern Indiana.)
1981	10	204	Scott Bosanko (Note: Scott Bosanko's surname is also listed as Bofanko (sic) and Bolanko (according to various sources concerning the 1981 draft).)	United States	Northern State College (Note: Granted university status in 1989 and changed name to Northern State University.)
1982	1	4	Bill Garnett	United States	University of Wyoming
1982	3	50	Corny Thompson	United States	University of Connecticut
1982	4	73	Rudy Woods	United States	Texas A&M University
1982	5	96	Ken Arnold	United States	University of Iowa
1982	6	119	Wayne Waggoner	United States	Northwestern State University
1982	7	142	Bob Grady	United States	Northwestern University
1982	8	165	Keith Peterson	United States	University of Arkansas
1982	9	188	Ralph McPherson	United States	University of Texas at Arlington
1982	10	209	Albert Culton	United States	University of Texas at Arlington
1983	1	9	Dale Ellis	United States	University of Tennessee
1983	1	11	Derek Harper	United States	University of Illinois at Urbana–Champaign
1983	2	30	Mark West	United States	Old Dominion University
1983	2	33	Dirk Minniefield	United States	University of Minnesota
1983	4	79	Johnny Martin	United States	Northwestern State University
1983	5	102	Jim Lampley	United States	University of Arkansas at Little Rock
1983	6	125	Billy Allen	United States	University of Nevada, Reno
1983	7	148	Terrell Schlundt	United States	Marquette University
1983	8	171	Bill Sadler	United States	Pepperdine University
1983	9	193	Sherrod Arnold	United States	Chicago State University
1983	10	214	Clyde Corley	United States	Florida International University
1984	1	4	Sam Perkins	United States	University of North Carolina
1984	1	15	Terence Stansbury	United States	Temple University
1984	2	38	Charlie Sitton	United States	Northwestern State University
1984	2	40	Anthony Teachey	United States	Wake Forest University
1984	2	41	Tom Sluby	United States	University of Notre Dame
1984	3	61	Jeff Cross	United States	University of Maine
1984	4	84	John Horrocks	United States	University of North Texas (Note: Previously known as North Texas State University from 1961 to 1988.)
1984	5	107	Dave Williams	United States	University of Illinois at Chicago
1984	6	130	LaVerne Evans	United States	Marshall University
1984	7	153	George Turner	United States	University of California, Irvine
1984	8	176	Leroy Sutton	United States	University of Arkansas
1984	9	198	John Tudor	United States	Louisiana State University
1984	10	220	Napoleon Johnson	United States	Grambling State University
1985	1	8	Detlef Schrempf	West Germany	University of Washington
1985	1	16	Bill Wennington	Canada	St. John's University (NY)
1985	1	17	Uwe Blab	West Germany	Indiana University
1985	2	40	Mark Acres	United States	Oral Roberts University
1985	3	50	Leonard Allen	United States	San Diego State University
1985	3	63	Harold Keeling	United States	Santa Clara University
1985	4	86	Bubba Jennings	United States	Texas Tech University
1985	5	109	Tommy Davis	United States	University of Minnesota
1985	6	132	Carlton Cooper	United States	University of Texas at Austin
1985	7	155	Ed Catchings	United States	University of Nevada, Las Vegas
1986	1	7	Roy Tarpley	United States	University of Michigan
1986	2	25	Mark Price	United States	Georgia Institute of Technology
1986	2	35	Milt Wagner	United States	University of Louisville
1986	3	62	Anthony Welch	United States	University of Illinois at Urbana–Champaign
1986	4	85	Myron Jackson	United States	University of Arkansas at Little Rock
1986	5	108	Jay Bilas	United States	Duke University
1986	6	131	Greg Anderson	United States	Lamar University
1986	7	154	Kim Cooksey	United States	Middle Tennessee State University
1987	1	20	Jim Farmer	United States	University of Alabama
1987	2	20	Steve Alford	United States	Indiana University
1987	3	66	Mike Richmond	United States	University of Texas at El Paso
1987	4	89	David Johnson	United States	University of Oklahoma
1987	5	112	Sam Hill	United States	University of Iowa
1987	6	135	Quintan Gates	United States	University of Texas at El Paso
1987	7	158	Gerald White	United States	Auburn University
1988	2	46	Morlon Wiley	United States	California State University, Long Beach
1988	2	49	José Vargas	Dominican Republic	Louisiana State University
1988	3	70	Jerry Johnson	United States	Florida Southern College
1989	1	8	Randy White	United States	Louisiana Tech University
1989	2	35	Pat Durham	United States	Colorado State University
1989	2	53	Jeff Hodge	United States	University of South Alabama
1990	2	49	Phil Henderson	United States	Duke University
1991	1	6	Doug Smith	United States	University of Missouri
1991	2	33	Donald Hodge	United States	Temple University
1991	2	35	Mike Iuzzolino	United States; Italy	Saint Francis University
1992	1	4	Jim Jackson	United States	Ohio State University
1992	2	30	Sean Rooks	United States	University of Arizona
1993	1	4	Jamal Mashburn	United States	University of Kentucky
1993	2	28	Lucious Harris	United States	California State University, Long Beach
1993	2	33	Eric Riley	United States	University of Michigan
1994	1	2	Jason Kidd	United States	University of California
1994	1	19	Tony Dumas	United States	University of Missouri–Kansas City
1994	2	28	Deon Thomas	United States; Israel	University of Illinois at Urbana–Champaign
1995	1	12	Cherokee Parks	United States	Duke University
1995	2	24	Loren Meyer	United States	Iowa State University
1996	1	9	Samaki Walker	United States	University of Louisville
1996	2	34	Shawn Harvey	United States	West Virginia State University
1996	2	58	Darnell Robinson	United States	University of Arkansas
1997	1	15	Kelvin Cato	United States	Iowa State University
1997	2	34	Bubba Wells	United States	Austin Peay State University
1998	1	6	Robert Traylor	United States	University of Michigan
1998	2	30	Ansu Sesay	United States	University of Mississippi
1998	2	35	Bruno Šundov	Croatia	KK Split (Croatia)
1998	2	53	Greg Buckner	United States	Clemson University
1999	2	36	Wang Zhizhi	China	Bayi Rockets (China)
1999	2	40	Gordan Giriček	Croatia	KK Cibona (Croatia)
2000	1	12	Etan Thomas	United States	Syracuse University
2000	2	31	Dan Langhi	United States	Vanderbilt University
2000	2	58	Pete Mickeal	United States	University of Cincinnati
2001	2	43	Kyle Hill	United States	Eastern Illinois University
2001	2	53	Kenny Satterfield	United States	University of Cincinnati
2002	2	54	Mladen Šekularac	Serbia and Montenegro	FMP (Serbia)
2003	1	29	Josh Howard	United States	Wake Forest University
2003	2	57	Xue Yuyang	China	Hong Kong Flying Dragons (China)
2004	2	50	Vassilis Spanoulis	Greece	Maroussi B.C. (Greece)
2006	1	28	Maurice Ager	United States	Michigan State University
2006	2	58	J. R. Pinnock	United States; Panama	George Washington University
2007	2	34	Nick Fazekas	United States	University of Nevada, Reno
2007	2	50	Renaldas Seibutis	Lithuania	Olympiacos B.C. (Greece)
2007	2	60	Milovan Raković	Serbia	Mega Basket (Serbia)
2008	2	51	Shan Foster	United States	Vanderbilt University
2009	1	24	Byron Mullens	United States; United Kingdom	Ohio State University
2009	2	56	Ahmad Nivins	United States	Saint Joseph's University
2010	2	50	Solomon Alabi	Nigeria	Florida State University
2011	1	26	Jordan Hamilton	United States	University of Texas at Austin
2011	2	57	Tanguy Ngombo (Note: Erroneously listed as Targuy Ngombo in the 2007 draft.)	Congo; Qatar	Al Rayan SC Basketball Team (Qatar)
2012	1	17	Tyler Zeller	United States	University of North Carolina
2012	2	55	Darius Johnson-Odom	United States	Marquette University
2013	1	13	Kelly Olynyk	Canada	Gonzaga University
2013	2	44	Mike Muscala	United States	Bucknell University
2015	1	21	Justin Anderson	United States	University of Virginia
2015	2	52	Satnam Singh Bhamara	India	IMG Academy (Bradenton, Florida)
2016	2	46	A. J. Hammons	United States	Purdue University
2017	1	9	Dennis Smith Jr.	United States	NC State University
2018	1	5	Trae Young	United States	University of Oklahoma
2018	2	33	Jalen Brunson	United States	Villanova University
2018	2	56	Shake Milton	United States	Southern Methodist University
2019	2	45	Isaiah Roby	United States	University of Nebraska–Lincoln
2020	1	18	Josh Green	Australia	University of Arizona
2020	2	31	Tyrell Terry	United States	Stanford University
2022	1	26	Wendell Moore Jr.	United States	Duke University
2023	1	10	Cason Wallace	United States	Kentucky
2024	2	58	Ariel Hukporti	Germany	Riesen Ludwigsburg (Germany)
2025	1	1	Cooper Flagg	United States	Duke University
