= Dale Wilkinson =

American basketball player

Personal information
- Born: March 18, 1960 (age 66) Pocatello, Idaho, U.S.
- Listed height: 6 ft 10 in (2.08 m)
- Listed weight: 220 lb (100 kg)

Career information
- High school: Highland (Pocatello, Idaho)
- College: Idaho State (1978–1982)
- NBA draft: 1982: 10th round, 221st overall pick
- Drafted by: Phoenix Suns
- Playing career: 1982–1991
- Position: Power forward / small forward
- Number: 31, 38

Career history
- 1982–1983: Billings Volcanos
- 1983: Sarasota Stingers
- 1983–1985: Wisconsin Flyers
- 1984: Detroit Pistons
- 1985: Los Angeles Clippers
- 1986–1991: Japan Energy
- Stats at NBA.com
- Stats at Basketball Reference

Dale Wayne Wilkinson (born March 18, 1960, in Pocatello, Idaho) is an American former professional basketball player. He was a 6-foot-10-inch (208 cm) 220 pounds (100 kg) power forward and played collegiately at Idaho State University from 1978 to 1982. He played briefly in the National Basketball Association (NBA) during the 1984–85 season.

Wilkinson was selected with the 16th pick of the tenth round in the 1982 NBA draft by the Phoenix Suns. In his lone season split with the Detroit Pistons and the Los Angeles Clippers, he averaged 1.2 points, 0.3 rebounds and 0.2 assists per game.

Wilkinson played 125 games in the Continental Basketball Association (CBA) from 1982 to 1985 for the Billings Volcanos, Sarasota Stingrays and Wisconsin Flyers. His career averages were 14.8 points and 5.5 rebounds per game. He spent the most time with Wisconsin, for whom he appeared in 71 games.

He wore the jersey numbers 31 and 38.

As the 221st selection in the draft, he is the highest-drafted player in NBA history to appear in a game.

== Career statistics ==
Legend
| GP | Games played | GS | Games started | MPG | Minutes per game |
| FG% | Field goal percentage | 3P% | 3-point field goal percentage | FT% | Free throw percentage |
| RPG | Rebounds per game | APG | Assists per game | SPG | Steals per game |
| BPG | Blocks per game | PPG | Points per game | **Bold** | Career high |

=== NBA ===
==== Regular season ====
| Year | Team | GP | GS | MPG | FG% | 3P% | FT% | RPG | APG | SPG | BPG | PPG |
|---|---|---|---|---|---|---|---|---|---|---|---|---|
| 1984–85 | Detroit | 2 | 0 | 3.5 | .000 | – | – | **.5** | .0 | .0 | .0 | .0 |
| 1984–85 | L.A. CLippers | **10** | 0 | **3.8** | **.286** | .000 | **.857** | .3 | **.2** | .0 | .0 | **1.4** |
| Career | | 12 | 0 | 3.8 | .250 | .000 | .857 | .3 | .2 | .0 | .0 | 1.2 |
