= 1982 NBA draft =

Basketball player selection

General information
- Sport: Basketball
- Date: June 29, 1982
- Location: Felt Forum, Madison Square Garden (New York City, New York)
- Network: USA Network

Overview
- 225 total selections in 10 rounds
- League: NBA
- First selection: James Worthy (Los Angeles Lakers)
- Hall of Famers: 2: SF James Worthy; SF Dominique Wilkins

The 1982 NBA draft took place on June 29, 1982, at the Felt Forum at Madison Square Garden in New York City, New York.

The #1 selection from this year's draft, future Hall of Fame small forward James Worthy, was drafted by the Los Angeles Lakers despite them winning the NBA championship the previous season. Their #1 selection in 1982 came from a 1979 trade the team had made with the Cleveland Cavaliers, in which Cleveland had traded their first-round pick for journeyman power forward Don Ford. Worthy would help turn LA into the Showtime Lakers dynasty of the 1980s. Meanwhile, what proved to be reckless trades of first round draft picks by then Cavaliers' owner Ted Stepien led to the NBA creating the "Ted Stepien Rule" forbidding teams from trading first round draft picks in back-to-back years unless they had a different first-round pick that they kept during that time.

== Draft ==
| PG | Point guard | SG | Shooting guard | SF | Small forward | PF | Power forward | C | Center |

| ^ | Denotes player who has been inducted to the Naismith Memorial Basketball Hall of Fame |
| * | Denotes player who has been selected for at least one All-Star Game and All-NBA Team |
| ^{+} | Denotes player who has been selected for at least one All-Star Game |
| ^{x} | Denotes player who has been selected for at least one All-NBA Team |
| ^{#} | Denotes player who has never appeared in an NBA regular-season or playoff game |
| ^{~} | Denotes player who has been selected as Rookie of the Year |

Hall of Famer James Worthy was selected first overall by the Los Angeles Lakers.

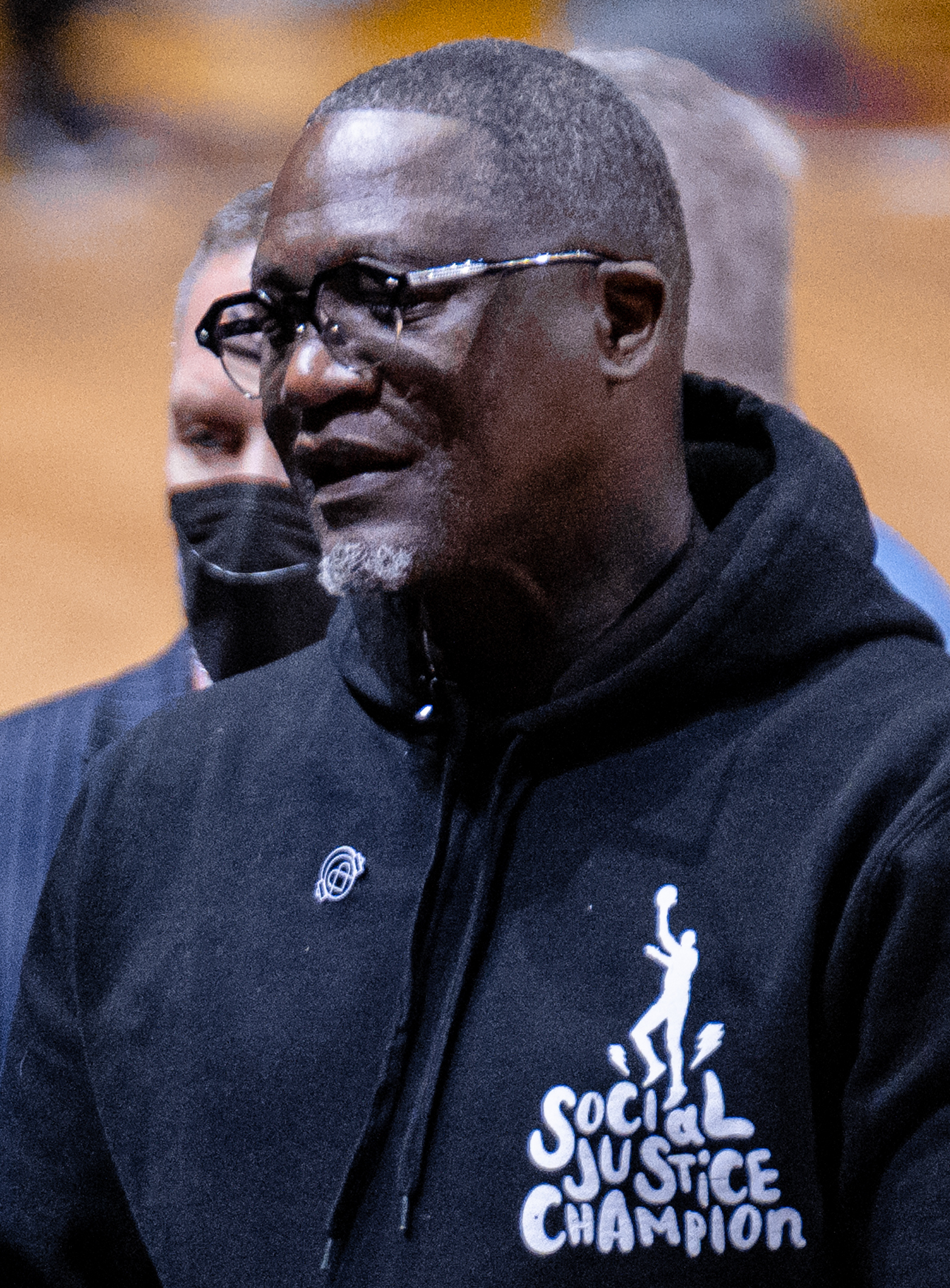
Dubbed "The Human Highlight Film", Hall of Famer Dominique Wilkins was selected third overall by the Atlanta Hawks.

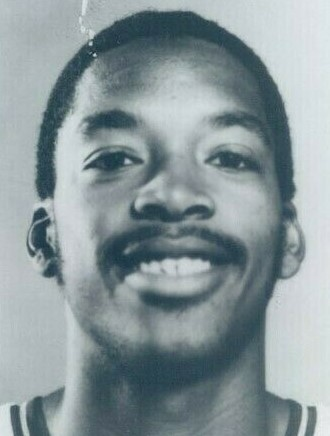
Two-time All-Star Fat Lever was selected eleventh overall by the Portland Trail Blazers.

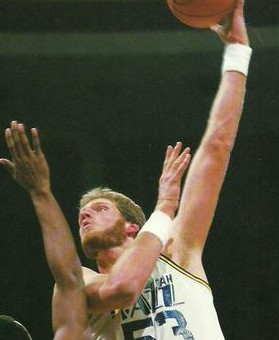
7'4" Mark Eaton was selected 72nd overall by the Utah Jazz, and holds both the all-time season and career NBA blocks-per-game records

| Round | Pick | Player | Pos. | Nationality | Team | School/club team |
|---|---|---|---|---|---|---|
| 1 | 1 | James Worthy^ | SF | United States | Los Angeles Lakers (from Cleveland) | North Carolina (Jr.) |
| 1 | 2 | Terry Cummings*~ | PF | United States | San Diego Clippers | DePaul (Jr.) |
| 1 | 3 | Dominique Wilkins^ | SF | United States | Utah Jazz (traded to Atlanta) | Georgia (Jr.) |
| 1 | 4 | Bill Garnett | SF | United States | Dallas Mavericks | Wyoming (Sr.) |
| 1 | 5 | LaSalle Thompson | C/PF | United States | Kansas City Kings | Texas (Jr.) |
| 1 | 6 | Trent Tucker | SG | United States | New York Knicks | Minnesota (Sr.) |
| 1 | 7 | Quintin Dailey | SG | United States | Chicago Bulls | San Francisco (Jr.) |
| 1 | 8 | Clark Kellogg | PF | United States | Indiana Pacers | Ohio State (Jr.) |
| 1 | 9 | Cliff Levingston | PF | United States | Detroit Pistons | Wichita State (Jr.) |
| 1 | 10 | Keith Edmonson | SG | United States | Atlanta Hawks | Purdue (Sr.) |
| 1 | 11 | Fat Lever* | PG | United States | Portland Trail Blazers | Arizona State (Sr.) |
| 1 | 12 | John Bagley | PG | United States | Cleveland Cavaliers (from Washington via Detroit) | Boston College (Jr.) |
| 1 | 13 | Sleepy Floyd^{+} | SG | United States | New Jersey Nets | Georgetown (Sr.) |
| 1 | 14 | Lester Conner | PG | United States | Golden State Warriors | Oregon State (Sr.) |
| 1 | 15 | David Thirdkill | SF | United States | Phoenix Suns (from Denver) | Bradley (Sr.) |
| 1 | 16 | Terry Teagle | SG | United States | Houston Rockets | Baylor (Sr.) |
| 1 | 17 | Brook Steppe | SG | United States | Kansas City Kings (from Phoenix via New Jersey) | Georgia Tech (Sr.) |
| 1 | 18 | Ricky Pierce^{+} | SF | United States | Detroit Pistons (from San Antonio via Portland) | Rice (Sr.) |
| 1 | 19 | Rob Williams | PG | United States | Denver Nuggets (from Seattle) | Houston (Jr.) |
| 1 | 20 | Paul Pressey | SF | United States | Milwaukee Bucks | Tulsa (Sr.) |
| 1 | 21 | Eddie Phillips | SF | United States | New Jersey Nets (from Los Angeles) | Alabama (Sr.) |
| 1 | 22 | Mark McNamara | C | United States | Philadelphia 76ers | California (Sr.) |
| 1 | 23 | Darren Tillis | C | United States | Boston Celtics | Cleveland State (Sr.) |
| 2 | 24 | Oliver Robinson | SG | United States | San Antonio Spurs | UAB (Sr.) |
| 2 | 25 | Bryan Warrick | SG | United States | Washington Bullets | Saint Joseph's (Sr.) |
| 2 | 26 | Ricky Frazier^{#} | SF | United States | Chicago Bulls | Missouri (Sr.) |
| 2 | 27 | Fred Roberts | PF | United States | Milwaukee Bucks | BYU (Sr.) |
| 2 | 28 | Dave Magley | PF | United States | Cleveland Cavaliers | Kansas (Sr.) |
| 2 | 29 | Scott Hastings | F/C | United States | New York Knicks | Arkansas (Sr.) |
| 2 | 30 | Wallace Bryant | C | United States | Chicago Bulls | San Francisco (Sr.) |
| 2 | 31 | Rod Higgins | F | United States | Chicago Bulls | Fresno State (Sr.) |
| 2 | 32 | Richard Anderson | PF | United States | San Diego Clippers | UC Santa Barbara (Sr.) |
| 2 | 33 | Linton Townes | SF | United States | Portland Trail Blazers | James Madison (Sr.) |
| 2 | 34 | Vince Taylor | SF | United States | New York Knicks | Duke (Sr.) |
| 2 | 35 | Derek Smith | SG | United States | Golden State Warriors | Louisville (Sr.) |
| 2 | 36 | J. J. Anderson | SF | United States | Philadelphia 76ers | Bradley (Sr.) |
| 2 | 37 | Audie Norris | C | United States | Portland Trail Blazers | Jackson State (Sr.) |
| 2 | 38 | Wayne Sappleton | F | Jamaica | Golden State Warriors (traded to New Jersey) | Loyola (IL) (Sr.) |
| 2 | 39 | Kevin Magee^{#} | PF | United States | Phoenix Suns | UC Irvine (Sr.) |
| 2 | 40 | Guy Morgan | G | United States | Indiana Pacers | Wake Forest (Sr.) |
| 2 | 41 | Dwight Anderson | G | United States | Washington Bullets | USC (Sr.) |
| 2 | 42 | Jeff Taylor | SG | United States | Houston Rockets | Texas Tech (Sr.) |
| 2 | 43 | Jose Slaughter | SG | United States | Indiana Pacers | Portland (Sr.) |
| 2 | 44 | Mike Gibson | F | United States | Washington Bullets | USC Upstate (Sr.) |
| 2 | 45 | Russ Schoene | F/C | United States | Philadelphia 76ers | Chattanooga (Sr.) |
| 2 | 46 | Tony Guy^{#} | G | United States | Boston Celtics | Kansas (Sr.) |
| 3 | 47 | Mike Wilson | G | United States | Cleveland Cavaliers | Marquette (Sr.) |
| 3 | 48 | Craig Hodges | SG | United States | San Diego Clippers | Long Beach State (Sr.) |
| 3 | 49 | Steve Trumbo^{#} | F | United States; Spain | Utah Jazz | BYU (Sr.) |
| 3 | 50 | Corny Thompson | PF | United States | Dallas Mavericks | Connecticut (Sr.) |
| 3 | 51 | Jim Johnstone | PF/C | United States | Kansas City Kings | Wake Forest (Sr.) |
| 3 | 52 | Dan Caldwell^{#} | F | United States | New York Knicks | Washington (Sr.) |
| 3 | 53 | Tyrone Adams^{#} | F | United States | Chicago Bulls | Kansas State (Sr.) |
| 3 | 54 | Hutch Jones | PG | United States | San Diego Clippers | Vanderbilt (Sr.) |
| 3 | 55 | Jerry Eaves | PG | United States | Utah Jazz | Louisville (Sr.) |
| 3 | 56 | Joe Kopicki | PF | United States | Atlanta Hawks | Detroit (Sr.) |
| 3 | 57 | Craig Tucker^{#} | G | United States | New York Knicks | Illinois (Sr.) |
| 3 | 58 | Mike Largey^{#} | F | United States | Washington Bullets | Upsala (Sr.) |
| 3 | 59 | Jimmy Black^{#} | G | United States | New Jersey Nets | North Carolina (Sr.) |
| 3 | 60 | Chris Engler | C | United States | Golden State Warriors | Wyoming (Sr.) |
| 3 | 61 | Charles Pittman | PF | United States | Phoenix Suns | Maryland (Sr.) |
| 3 | 62 | Roylin Bond^{#} | G | United States | Denver Nuggets | Pepperdine (Sr.) |
| 3 | 63 | Chuck Nevitt | C | United States | Houston Rockets | NC State (Sr.) |
| 3 | 64 | Willie Redden^{#} | C | United States | San Antonio Spurs | South Florida (Sr.) |
| 3 | 65 | John Greig | SF | United States | Seattle SuperSonics | Oregon (Sr.) |
| 3 | 66 | Phillip Lockett^{#} | F | United States | Portland Trail Blazers | Alabama (Sr.) |
| 3 | 67 | Mike Hackett^{#} | F | United States | Los Angeles Lakers | Jacksonville (Sr.) |
| 3 | 68 | Dale Solomon^{#} | C | United States | Philadelphia 76ers | Virginia Tech (Sr.) |
| 3 | 69 | Perry Moss | PG | United States | Boston Celtics | Northeastern (Sr.) |
| 4 | 70 | Reggie Hannah^{#} | F | United States | Cleveland Cavaliers | South Alabama (Sr.) |
| 4 | 71 | Darius Clemons^{#} | G | United States | San Diego Clippers | Loyola Chicago (Sr.) |
| 4 | 72 | Mark Eaton^{+} | C | United States | Utah Jazz | UCLA (Sr.) |
| 4 | 73 | Rudy Woods^{#} | C | United States | Dallas Mavericks | Texas A&M (Sr.) |
| 4 | 74 | Mike Sanders | SG | United States | Kansas City Kings | UCLA (Sr.) |
| 4 | 75 | Norm Anchrum^{#} | C | United States | New York Knicks | UAB (Sr.) |
| 4 | 76 | Chuck Aleksinas | C | United States | Chicago Bulls | Connecticut (Sr.) |
| 4 | 77 | Jeff Jones^{#} | G | United States | Indiana Pacers | Virginia (Sr.) |
| 4 | 78 | Walker Russell | SG | United States | Detroit Pistons | Western Michigan (Sr.) |
| 4 | 79 | Eric Smith^{#} | F | United States | Portland Trail Blazers | Georgetown (Sr.) |
| 4 | 80 | James Griffin^{#} | F | United States | New Jersey Nets | Illinois (Sr.) |
| 4 | 81 | Dino Gregory^{#} | F | United States | Washington Bullets | Long Beach State (Sr.) |
| 4 | 82 | Tony Brown | SF/SG | United States | New Jersey Nets | Arkansas (Sr.) |
| 4 | 83 | Ken Stancell^{#} | F | United States | Golden State Warriors | VCU (Sr.) |
| 4 | 84 | Alford Turner^{#} | G | United States | Denver Nuggets | Southwestern Louisiana (Sr.) |
| 4 | 85 | Andre Gaddy^{#} | C | United States | Houston Rockets | George Mason (Sr.) |
| 4 | 86 | Rory White | PF | United States | Phoenix Suns | South Alabama (Sr.) |
| 4 | 87 | Tony Grier^{#} | G | United States | San Antonio Spurs | South Florida (Sr.) |
| 4 | 88 | Ken Owens^{#} | G | United States | Seattle SuperSonics | Idaho (Sr.) |
| 4 | 89 | Jerry Beck^{#} | F | United States | Milwaukee Bucks | Middle Tennessee (Sr.) |
| 4 | 90 | Craig McCormick^{#} | C | United States | Los Angeles Lakers | Western Kentucky (Sr.) |
| 4 | 91 | Bruce Atkins^{#} | F | United States | Philadelphia 76ers | Duquesne (Sr.) |
| 4 | 92 | Greg Stewart^{#} | F | United States | Boston Celtics | Tulsa (Sr.) |
| 5 | 93 | Terry White^{#} | F | United States | Cleveland Cavaliers | UTEP (Sr.) |
| 5 | 94 | Gary Carter^{#} | G | United States | San Diego Clippers | Tennessee (Sr.) |
| 5 | 95 | Mike McKay^{#} | F | United States | Utah Jazz | Connecticut (Sr.) |
| 5 | 96 | Kenny Arnold^{#} | G | United States | Dallas Mavericks | Iowa (Sr.) |
| 5 | 97 | Kenny Simpson^{#} | G | United States | Kansas City Kings | Grambling State (Sr.) |
| 5 | 98 | Aaron Howard^{#} | F | United States | New York Knicks | Villanova (Sr.) |
| 5 | 99 | Rubin Jackson^{#} | G | United States | Chicago Bulls | Oklahoma City (Sr.) |
| 5 | 100 | Rich DiBenedetto^{#} | F | United States | Indiana Pacers | Wisconsin–Eau Claire (Sr.) |
| 5 | 101 | John Ebeling^{#} | F | United States | Detroit Pistons | Florida Southern (Sr.) |
| 5 | 102 | Mark Hall^{#} | G | United States | Atlanta Hawks | Minnesota (Sr.) |
| 5 | 103 | Cherokee Rhone^{#} | F | United States | Portland Trail Blazers | Centenary (Sr.) |
| 5 | 104 | Clarence Dickerson^{#} | G | United States | Washington Bullets | Hawaii (Sr.) |
| 5 | 105 | Chris Giles^{#} | F | United States | New Jersey Nets | UAB (Sr.) |
| 5 | 106 | Albert Irving^{#} | F | United States | Golden State Warriors | Alcorn State (Sr.) |
| 5 | 107 | Jeff Schneider^{#} | G | United States | Houston Rockets | Virginia Tech (Sr.) |
| 5 | 108 | Marvin McCrary^{#} | G | United States | Phoenix Suns | Missouri (Sr.) |
| 5 | 109 | Bill Duffy^{#} | G | United States | Denver Nuggets | Santa Clara (Sr.) |
| 5 | 110 | Clarence Swannegan^{#} | F | United States | San Antonio Spurs | Texas Tech (Sr.) |
| 5 | 111 | Rod Camp^{#} | C | United States | Seattle SuperSonics | Southern Illinois (Sr.) |
| 5 | 112 | Jerry Davis^{#} | F | United States | Washington Bullets | Detroit Mercy (Sr.) |
| 5 | 113 | Howard McNeill^{#} | F | United States | Los Angeles Lakers | Seton Hall (Sr.) |
| 5 | 114 | Donald Mason^{#} | G | United States | Philadelphia 76ers | Fresno State (Sr.) |
| 5 | 115 | William Brown^{#} | G | United States | Boston Celtics | Saint Peter's (Sr.) |
| 6 | 116 | Vince Reynolds^{#} | F | United States | Cleveland Cavaliers | South Florida (Sr.) |
| 6 | 117 | Eric Marbury^{#} | G | United States | San Diego Clippers | Georgia (Sr.) |
| 6 | 118 | Alvin Jackson^{#} | G | United States | Utah Jazz | Southern (Sr.) |
| 6 | 119 | Wayne Waggoner^{#} | G | United States | Dallas Mavericks | Northwestern State (Sr.) |
| 6 | 120 | Poncho Wright^{#} | F | United States | Kansas City Kings | Louisville (Sr.) |
| 6 | 121 | Mike Kanieski^{#} | C | United States | New York Knicks | Dayton (Sr.) |
| 6 | 122 | B. B. Fontenet^{#} | G | United States | Chicago Bulls | Nevada (Sr.) |
| 6 | 123 | Jeff Clark^{#} | G | United States | Indiana Pacers | Saint Joseph's (Sr.) |
| 6 | 124 | Gary Holmes^{#} | F | United States | Detroit Pistons | Minnesota (Sr.) |
| 6 | 125 | Leo Cunningham^{#} | C | United States | Portland Trail Blazers | Utah State (Sr.) |
| 6 | 126 | Jay Bruchack^{#} | G | United States | Atlanta Hawks | Mount St. Mary's (Sr.) |
| 6 | 127 | Byron Williams^{#} | F | United States | Washington Bullets | Idaho State (Sr.) |
| 6 | 128 | Mel Daniel^{#} | G | United States | New Jersey Nets | Furman (Sr.) |
| 6 | 129 | David Vann^{#} | G | United States | Golden State Warriors | Saint Mary's (Sr.) |
| 6 | 130 | Jake Bethany^{#} | C | United States | Phoenix Suns | Hardin–Simmons (Sr.) |
| 6 | 131 | Chris Brust^{#} | F | United States | Denver Nuggets | North Carolina (Sr.) |
| 6 | 132 | Don Wilson^{#} | F | United States | Houston Rockets | Louisiana–Monroe (Sr.) |
| 6 | 133 | Jaime Pena^{#} | F | United States | San Antonio Spurs | New Mexico State (Sr.) |
| 6 | 134 | Bobby Potts^{#} | F | United States | Seattle SuperSonics | Charlotte (Sr.) |
| 6 | 135 | Tony Carr^{#} | G | United States | Milwaukee Bucks | Wisconsin–Eau Claire (Sr.) |
| 6 | 136 | Lynden Rose^{#} | G | Bahamas | Los Angeles Lakers | Houston (Sr.) |
| 6 | 137 | Kevin Boyle^{#} | F | United States | Philadelphia 76ers | Iowa (Sr.) |
| 6 | 138 | John Schweitz | SG | United States | Boston Celtics | Richmond (Sr.) |
| 7 | 139 | Randy Reed^{#} | F | United States | Cleveland Cavaliers | Kansas State (Sr.) |
| 7 | 140 | Eddie Hughes | PG | United States | San Diego Clippers | Colorado State (Sr.) |
| 8 | 141 | Thad Garner^{#} | F | United States | Utah Jazz | Michigan (Sr.) |
| 7 | 142 | Bob Grady^{#} | F | United States | Dallas Mavericks | Northwestern (Sr.) |
| 7 | 143 | Perry Range^{#} | G | United States | Kansas City Kings | Illinois (Sr.) |
| 7 | 144 | Phil Seymore^{#} | G | United States | New York Knicks | Canisius (Sr.) |
| 7 | 145 | Chuck Verderber^{#} | F | United States | Chicago Bulls | Kentucky (Sr.) |
| 7 | 146 | Brad Leaf^{#} | F | United States; Israel | Indiana Pacers | Evansville (Sr.) |
| 7 | 147 | Deon Marquardt^{#} | C | United States | Detroit Pistons | Marquette (Sr.) |
| 7 | 148 | Horace Wyatt^{#} | F | United States | Atlanta Hawks | Clemson (Sr.) |
| 7 | 149 | Terry Long^{#} | G | United States | Portland Trail Blazers | Lamar (Sr.) |
| 7 | 150 | Wendell Gibson^{#} | F | United States | Washington Bullets | USC Upstate (Sr.) |
| 7 | 151 | Tony Anderson^{#} | F | United States | New Jersey Nets | UCLA (Sr.) |
| 7 | 152 | Matt Waldron^{#} | F | United States | Golden State Warriors | Pacific (Sr.) |
| 7 | 153 | Jeb Barlow^{#} | F | United States | Denver Nuggets | North Carolina (Sr.) |
| 7 | 154 | Mike Helms^{#} | G | United States | Houston Rockets | Wake Forest (Sr.) |
| 7 | 155 | Phil Ward^{#} | G | United States | Phoenix Suns | Charlotte (Sr.) |
| 7 | 156 | Delonte Taylor^{#} | G | United States | San Antonio Spurs | North Texas (Sr.) |
| 7 | 157 | Allen Rayhorn^{#} | C | United States | Seattle SuperSonics | Northern Illinois (Sr.) |
| 7 | 158 | Bobby Austin^{#} | G | United States | Milwaukee Bucks | Cincinnati (Sr.) |
| 7 | 159 | Maurice Williams^{#} | F | United States | Los Angeles Lakers | USC (Sr.) |
| 7 | 160 | Keith Hilliard^{#} | G | United States | Philadelphia 76ers | Missouri State (Sr.) |
| 7 | 161 | Phil Collins^{#} | C | United States | Boston Celtics | West Virginia (Sr.) |
| 8 | 162 | Monty Knight^{#} | G | United States | Cleveland Cavaliers | VCU (Sr.) |
| 8 | 163 | Jacques Tuz^{#} | F | United States | San Diego Clippers | Colorado (Sr.) |
| 8 | 164 | Rick Campbell^{#} | G | United States | Utah Jazz | Middle Tennessee (Sr.) |
| 8 | 165 | Keith Peterson^{#} | F | United States | Dallas Mavericks | Arkansas (Sr.) |
| 8 | 166 | Ed Nealy | PF | United States | Kansas City Kings | Kansas State (Sr.) |
| 8 | 167 | Dan Terwilliger^{#} | F | United States | New York Knicks | Siena (Sr.) |
| 8 | 168 | Mike Burns^{#} | G | United States | Chicago Bulls | UNLV (Sr.) |
| 8 | 169 | Donald Reese^{#} | C | United States | Indiana Pacers | Bradley (Sr.) |
| 8 | 170 | Brian Nyenhuis^{#} | F | United States | Detroit Pistons | Marquette (Sr.) |
| 8 | 171 | Dave Porter^{#} | F | United States | Portland Trail Blazers | Western Oregon (Sr.) |
| 8 | 172 | James Ratiff^{#} | F | United States | Atlanta Hawks | Howard (Sr.) |
| 8 | 173 | Ken Luck^{#} | G | United States | Washington Bullets | Delaware (Sr.) |
| 8 | 174 | Otis Jackson^{#} | G | United States | New Jersey Nets | Memphis (Sr.) |
| 8 | 175 | Mark King^{#} | F | United States | Golden State Warriors | Florida Southern (Sr.) |
| 8 | 176 | Dan Callandrillo^{#} | G | United States; Italy | Houston Rockets | Seton Hall (Sr.) |
| 8 | 177 | Rick Elrod^{#} | G | United States | Phoenix Suns | Georgetown (Kentucky) (Sr.) |
| 8 | 178 | Donnie Speer^{#} | F | United States | Denver Nuggets | UAB (Sr.) |
| 8 | 179 | Chis Faggi^{#} | F | United States | San Antonio Spurs | McNeese State (Sr.) |
| 8 | 180 | Steve Burks^{#} | G | United States | Seattle SuperSonics | Washington (Sr.) |
| 8 | 181 | Bryan Leonard^{#} | C | United States | Milwaukee Bucks | Illinois (Sr.) |
| 8 | 182 | Micah Blunt^{#} | C | United States | Los Angeles Lakers | Tulane (Sr.) |
| 8 | 183 | Donald Seals^{#} | F | United States | Philadelphia 76ers | Jackson State (Sr.) |
| 8 | 184 | Ed Spriggs^{#} | C | United States | Boston Celtics | Georgetown (Sr.) |
| 9 | 185 | Tony Hafley^{#} | F | United States | Cleveland Cavaliers | South Alabama (Sr.) |
| 9 | 186 | John Hegwood^{#} | F | United States | San Diego Clippers | San Francisco (Sr.) |
| 9 | 187 | Riley Clarida^{#} | F | United States | Utah Jazz | LIU (Sr.) |
| 9 | 188 | Ralph McPherson^{#} | F | United States | Dallas Mavericks | UT Arlington (Sr.) |
| 9 | 189 | Jack Moore^{#} | G | United States | Kansas City Kings | Nebraska (Sr.) |
| 9 | 190 | Merle Scott^{#} | G | United States | New York Knicks | South Carolina State (Sr.) |
| 9 | 191 | Skip Dillard^{#} | G | United States | Chicago Bulls | DePaul (Sr.) |
| 9 | 192 | Mike Scearce^{#} | F | United States | Indiana Pacers | Purdue (Sr.) |
| 9 | 193 | Kevin Smith^{#} | G | United States | Detroit Pistons | Michigan State (Sr.) |
| 9 | 194 | Pierre Bland^{#} | G | United States | Atlanta Hawks | Elizabeth City State (Sr.) |
| 9 | 195 | Mark Dearborn^{#} | F | United States | Portland Trail Blazers | Saint Joseph's (Sr.) |
| 9 | 196 | James Terry^{#} | F | United States; Israel | Washington Bullets | Howard (Sr.) |
| 9 | 197 | Gary Johnson^{#} | G | United States | New Jersey Nets | Oral Roberts (Sr.) |
| 9 | 198 | Nick Morken^{#} | G | United States | Golden State Warriors | Chattanooga (Sr.) |
| 9 | 199 | Ken Lyles^{#} | F | United States | Phoenix Suns | Washington (Sr.) |
| 9 | 200 | Dean Sears^{#} | F | United States | Denver Nuggets | UCLA (Sr.) |
| 9 | 201 | Harry O'Brien^{#} | F | United States | San Antonio Spurs | St. Mary's (Texas) (Sr.) |
| 9 | 202 | Robert Tate^{#} | G | United States | Milwaukee Bucks | Idaho State (Sr.) |
| 9 | 203 | Tim Byrne^{#} | G | United States | Los Angeles Lakers | Rutgers (Sr.) |
| 9 | 204 | George Melton^{#} | F | United States | Philadelphia 76ers | Cheyney (Sr.) |
| 9 | 205 | Panagiotis Giannakis^{#} | G | Greece | Boston Celtics | Ionikos Nikaias (Greece) |
| 10 | 206 | Durand Walker^{#} | G | United States | Cleveland Cavaliers | Marion (Sr.) |
| 10 | 207 | Daryl Stovall^{#} | F | United States | San Diego Clippers | Creighton (Sr.) |
| 10 | 208 | Michael Edwards^{#} | G | United States | Utah Jazz | New Orleans (Sr.) |
| 10 | 209 | Albert Culton^{#} | F | United States | Dallas Mavericks | UT Arlington (Sr.) |
| 10 | 210 | Robert Estes^{#} | F | United States | Kansas City Kings | Iowa State (Sr.) |
| 10 | 211 | John Leonard^{#} | G | United States | New York Knicks | Manhattan (Sr.) |
| 10 | 212 | Tony Britto^{#} | C | United States | Chicago Bulls | Campbell (Sr.) |
| 10 | 213 | Craig Summers^{#} | G | United States | Indiana Pacers | Wisconsin–Stout (Sr.) |
| 10 | 214 | David Coulthard^{#} | G | Canada | Detroit Pistons | York (Sr.) |
| 10 | 215 | Grant Taylor^{#} | F | United States | Portland Trail Blazers | UC Irvine (Sr.) |
| 10 | 216 | Ronnie McAdoo^{#} | F | United States | Atlanta Hawks | Old Dominion (Sr.) |
| 10 | 217 | Donald Sinclair^{#} | G | United States | Washington Bullets | North Carolina Central (Sr.) |
| 10 | 218 | Sean Tuohy^{#} | G | United States | New Jersey Nets | Ole Miss (Sr.) |
| 10 | 219 | Randy Whieldon^{#} | G | United States | Golden State Warriors | UC Irvine (Sr.) |
| 10 | 220 | Mike Phillips^{#} | G | United States | Denver Nuggets | Niagara (Sr.) |
| 10 | 221 | Dale Wilkinson | F | United States | Phoenix Suns | Idaho State (Sr.) |
| 10 | 222 | Keith White^{#} | F | United States | San Antonio Spurs | McMurry (Sr.) |
| 10 | 223 | Bob Coenen^{#} | F | United States | Milwaukee Bucks | Wisconsin–Eau Claire (Sr.) |
| 10 | 224 | Randy Burkert^{#} | G | United States | Philadelphia 76ers | Drexel (Sr.) |
| 10 | 225 | Landon Turner^{#} | F | United States | Boston Celtics | Indiana (Sr.) |

== Early entrants ==
=== College underclassmen ===
For the first time since 1978, a player that had previously qualified for entry in the NBA draft as a college underclassman (in this case, a Nigerian born player from Sam Houston State University named Yommy Sangodeyi) would later withdraw his entry into the draft pool. He would become the only underclassman player to officially withdraw his name from an NBA draft during the 1980s decade, though he would appear in the draft. The following twelve college basketball players successfully applied for early draft entrance otherwise.

- (United States) John Bagley – G, Boston College (junior)
- (United States) Terry Cummings – F, DePaul (junior)
- (United States) Quintin Dailey – G, San Francisco (junior)
- (United States) Ollie Johnson – F, Washington State (junior)
- (United States) Clark Kellogg – F, Ohio State (junior)
- (United States) Cliff Levingston – F, Wichita State (junior)
- (United States) Michael McDuffen – G, Murray State (junior)
- (United States) LaSalle Thompson – F/C, Texas (junior)
- (United States) Dominique Wilkins – F, Georgia (junior)
- (United States) Rob Williams – G, Houston (junior)
- (United States) James Worthy – F, North Carolina (junior)
- (United States) Victor Mitchell – C, Kansas (junior)

== Invited attendees ==
The 1982 NBA draft is considered to be the fifth NBA draft to have utilized what's properly considered the "green room" experience for NBA prospects. The NBA's green room is a staging area where anticipated draftees often sit with their families and representatives, waiting for their names to be called on draft night. Often being positioned either in front of or to the side of the podium (in this case, located in the Madison Square Garden's Felt Forum, a first at the Garden),), once a player heard his name, he would walk to the podium to shake hands and take promotional photos with the NBA commissioner. From there, the players often conducted interviews with various media outlets while backstage. However, once the NBA draft started to air nationally on TV starting with the 1980 NBA draft, the green room evolved from players waiting to hear their name called and then shaking hands with these select players who were often called to the hotel to take promotional pictures with the NBA commissioner a day or two after the draft concluded to having players in real-time waiting to hear their names called up and then shaking hands with Larry O'Brien, the NBA's commissioner. The NBA compiled its list of green room invites through collective voting by the NBA's team presidents and general managers alike, which in this year's case belonged to only what they believed were the top 14 prospects at the time. However, they inexplicably did not give an invite to the actual #1 pick of the draft there, All-American, ACC Player of the Year, and NCAA Tournament MVP on the championship North Carolina Tarheels James Worthy. On the opposite end of the spectrum, Scott Hastings would be the first invited green room player to stay there beyond the first round of the draft, falling into the second round and languishing to overall pick #29.

The following players were invited to attend the 1982 NBA draft festivities:

- (United States) Terry Cummings – PF, DePaul
- (United States) Quintin Dailey – SG, San Francisco
- (United States) Keith Edmonson – SG, Purdue
- (United States) Sleepy Floyd – PG/SG, Georgetown
- (United States) Bill Garnett – PF, Wyoming
- (United States) Scott Hastings – PF/C, Arkansas
- (United States) Clark Kellogg – PF, Ohio State
- (United States) Fat Lever – PG, Arizona State
- (United States) Cliff Levingston – PF, Wichita State
- (United States) Brook Steppe – SG/SF, Georgia Tech
- (United States) LaSalle Thompson – PF/C, Texas
- (United States) Trent Tucker – SG, Minnesota
- (United States) / (France) Dominique Wilkins – SF, Georgia
- (United States) Rob Williams – PG, Houston

== See also ==
- List of first overall NBA draft picks
