= Jack Moore (basketball) =

American basketball player

Personal information
- Born: December 26, 1959 Muncie, Indiana, U.S.
- Died: March 3, 1984 (aged 24) Cozad, Nebraska, U.S.
- Listed height: 5 ft 9 in (1.75 m)
- Listed weight: 165 lb (75 kg)

Career information
- High school: Muncie Central (Muncie, Indiana)
- College: Nebraska (1978–1982)
- NBA draft: 1982: 9th round, 189th overall pick
- Drafted by: Kansas City Kings
- Position: Point guard

Career highlights
- Frances Pomeroy Naismith Award (1982); Second-team Academic All-American (1982); First-team All-Big Eight (1982)
- Stats at Basketball Reference

Jack Moore (December 26, 1959 – March 3, 1984) was an American college basketball player. He played for the Nebraska Cornhuskers and was selected for the Frances Pomeroy Naismith Award in 1982 as the best player in the country under six feet tall. Moore was selected in the 1982 NBA draft by the Kansas City Kings but did not play professionally and instead worked as a stockbroker. He was killed in a plane crash in 1984.

== College career ==
Moore, a 5'9" point guard, came to Nebraska after leading his Muncie Central High School team to an Indiana state championship in 1978. Moore was a standout for the Cornhuskers on and off the court from 1978 to 1982. He was a first team All-Big Eight choice as a senior and finished second nationally in free throw percentage in both his junior and years. In the classroom, Moore made the academic all-conference team three years and was a second team Academic All-American as a senior. Nationally, he was awarded the Frances Pomeroy Naismith Award as the country's best player under six feet tall.

For his career, Moore scored 1,204 ponts and finished his career with a .901 free throw percentage – both a Big Eight and Nebraska record. Moore also holds the Nebraska record for free throw percentage in a season with .939 in 1981–82.

== Death and legacy ==
After graduating from Nebraska, Moore was drafted by the Kansas City Kings in the 1982 NBA draft, however he did not play in the National Basketball Association. He took a job as a stockbroker in North Platte, Nebraska.

On March 3, 1984, Moore was killed when his plane crashed into a farm in Cozad, Nebraska. He had been a passenger alongside the pilot, his stockbroker boss Gary Johnson, who were returning to North Platte from Muncie, Indiana, after a business trip. The wreckage was not discovered until almost two days later because it was hidden by snow.

Moore was posthumously inducted into both the Nebraska and Indiana Basketball Halls of Fame. For the 1984–85 season, the Nebraska athletic department established the Jack Moore Award, presented to the most valuable player for the Huskers each year. The first recipient was center Dave Hoppen.
