= Ricky Frazier =

American basketball player

Personal information
- Born: February 9, 1958 (age 68) Charleston, Missouri, U.S.
- Listed height: 6 ft 6 in (1.98 m)
- Listed weight: 185 lb (84 kg)

Career information
- High school: Charleston (Charleston, Missouri)
- College: Saint Louis (1977–1978); Missouri (1979–1982)
- NBA draft: 1982: 2nd round, 26th overall pick
- Drafted by: Chicago Bulls
- Position: Small forward

Career highlights
- Third-team All-American – AP, NABC, UPI (1982); Big Eight Player of the Year (1982)
- Stats at Basketball Reference

Rick Revene Frazier (born February 9, 1958) is an American former professional basketball player. After transferring from Saint Louis University in 1980, he played on three Big Eight Conference championship and NCAA Tournament teams at Missouri. Frazier led the Tigers in scoring in 1980 and 1981, and formerly held the school record for field goal percentage in a season. He was drafted by the National Basketball Association's Chicago Bulls in 1982.

Frazier was selected to Missouri's "Team of the Decade" for the 1980s.

== Honors ==
- All-Big Eight (1981, '82)
- All-District (1981, '82)
- Big Eight "Player of the Year" (1982)
- All-American (1982)
- Missouri's "Team of the Decade" (1980^{s})
- Mizzou Basketball All-Century Team
