= Dan Callandrillo =

Italian-American basketball player

Personal information
- Born: February 2, 1959 (age 67) North Bergen, New Jersey, U.S.
- Listed height: 6 ft 2 in (1.88 m)
- Listed weight: 185 lb (84 kg)

Career information
- High school: North Bergen (North Bergen, New Jersey)
- College: Seton Hall (1978–1982)
- NBA draft: 1982: 8th round, 176th overall pick
- Drafted by: Houston Rockets
- Playing career: 1982–?
- Position: Point guard / shooting guard

Career history
- 1982–1983: Rochester Zeniths
- 1983–1984: Bracknell Pirates
- 1984–1985: Solent Stars

Career highlights
- Third-team All-American – AP, NABC, UPI (1982); Big East Player of the Year (1982); First-team All-Big East (1982); 2× Second-team All-Big East (1980, 1981); Haggerty Award (1982)
- Stats at Basketball Reference

Daniel Callandrillo is an Italian-American former professional basketball player. He played NCAA Division I college basketball at Seton Hall. At a height of 1.88 metres (6 feet 2 inches) tall, he played at both the point guard and shooting guard positions, with shooting guard being his main position.

== High school ==
Raised in North Bergen, New Jersey, Callandrillo played basketball at North Bergen High School. In 1977, as a senior, he averaged 32 points a game, was a high school All-American, and led the school to a high school state championship.

== College career ==
Callandrillo played college basketball at Seton Hall University, with the Seton Hall Pirates, from 1978 to 1982. While at Seton Hall, he was named Second Team All-Big East, in both his sophomore and junior seasons. As a senior, he averaged 25.9 points per game (3rd in the nation), and was named a Third Team All-American, the Haggerty Award winner, and the Big East Player of the Year, in 1982.

In his four years at Seton Hall, Callandrillo scored a total of 1,985 points. He was later inducted into the Seton Hall Pirates Hall of Fame, in 1989.

== Professional career ==
After his college basketball career, Callandrillo was drafted by the Houston Rockets, in the 1982 NBA draft, but he never played for the team in the NBA. He instead played with the Rochester Zeniths in the American Continental Basketball Association (CBA), in the 1982–83 season. He then played with the Bracknell Pirates of the British Basketball League (BBL), in the 1983–84 season. Various reports credit him with a league high 52-point game that season against Sunderland. In fact the game was in a pre-season tournament played at Bracknell Sports Centre. It was the highest scored for Bracknell in any game at the time, but didn't count in the official records.

He then moved to the British club Solent Stars, for the 1984–85 season. With the Solent Stars, he played in the FIBA European Champions Cup (now called EuroLeague), in the 1984–85 season. He scored 52 points in the club's EuroLeague first leg game against the French club Limoges.

He then played professionally in Italy.

== Personal life ==
Callandrillo's son, Danny, also played college basketball, at Bryant University, and also played professionally in Italy. One of Dan's older brothers was Paul Callandrillo, an actor who was known professionally as Paul Land.

== Awards and accomplishments ==
=== College career ===
- Big East Conference Scoring Champion: (1980)
- 2× Second Team All-Big East Conference: (1980, 1981)
- New Jersey State Player of the Year: (1982)
- UNICO National Athlete of the Year: (1982)
- Haggerty Award Winner: (1982)
- First Team All-Big East Conference: (1982)
- Big East Conference Player of the Year: (1982)
- Third Team All-American: (1982)
- Seton Hall Pirates Hall of Fame: (1989)
