= John Schweitz =

American basketball player and coach

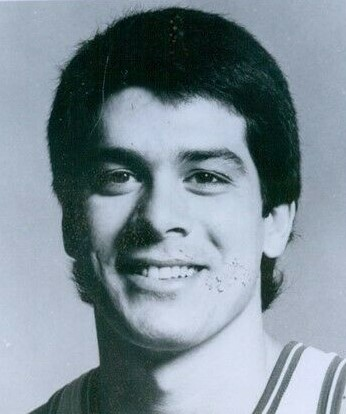

Personal information
- Born: April 19, 1960 (age 66) Waterloo, New York, U.S.
- Listed height: 6 ft 6 in (1.98 m)
- Listed weight: 210 lb (95 kg)

Career information
- High school: Waterloo (Waterloo, New York)
- College: Richmond (1978–1982)
- NBA draft: 1982: 6th round, 23rd overall pick
- Drafted by: Boston Celtics
- Position: Shooting guard
- Number: 35

Career history

Playing
- 1982–1983: Maine Lumberjacks
- 1983–1984: Albany Patroons
- 1984–1985: Seattle SuperSonics
- 1985–1986: Cincinnati Slammers
- 1986: Detroit Pistons

Coaching
- 1999–2000: Francis Marion (assistant)
- 2000–2006: Francis Marion

Career highlights
- CBA champion (1984); 2× First-team All-ECAC South (1981, 1982)
- Stats at NBA.com
- Stats at Basketball Reference

John Elwood Schweitz (born April 19, 1960) is an American former basketball player in the National Basketball Association (NBA). A 6-foot-6-inch (1.98 m) and 210 pounds (95 kg) shooting guard, Schweitz, from Waterloo, New York, and the University of Richmond, was selected by the Boston Celtics with the 23rd pick in the 6th round (138 overall) of the 1982 NBA draft. He played in two NBA seasons, for the Seattle SuperSonics and Detroit Pistons. He won a CBA championship with the Albany Patroons of the Continental Basketball Association (CBA) in 1984.

Schweitz was head men's basketball coach at Francis Marion University (FMU) for six seasons from July 2000 until March 2006, when his contract was not renewed. Prior to his stint with FMU, he served as an assistant coach with Loyola Marymount University, Irvine Valley Community College, and Long Beach State. While in high school, Schweitz was named to the New York State Sportswriters Association boys' basketball all-star first-team for small schools.

== Career statistics ==
Legend
GP	Games played	GS	Games started	MPG	Minutes per game
FG%	Field goal percentage	3P%	3-point field goal percentage	FT%	Free throw percentage
RPG	Rebounds per game	APG	Assists per game	SPG	Steals per game
BPG	Blocks per game	PPG	Points per game	**Bold**	Career high

=== NBA ===
==== Regular season ====
Year	Team	GP	GS	MPG	FG%	3P%	FT%	RPG	APG	SPG	BPG	PPG
1984–85	Seattle	**19**	0	**5.8**	**.338**	.000	**.700**	**1.1**	**.9**	.0	**.1**	**3.0**
1986–87	Detroit	3	0	2.3	.000	–	–	.3	.0	.0	.0	.0
Career		22	0	5.3	.333	.000	.700	1.0	.8	.0	.0	2.6
