= Terry Cummings =

American basketball player (born 1961)

Personal information
- Born: March 15, 1961 (age 65) Chicago, Illinois, U.S.
- Listed height: 6 ft 9 in (2.06 m)
- Listed weight: 220 lb (100 kg)

Career information
- High school: Carver (Chicago, Illinois)
- College: DePaul (1979–1982)
- NBA draft: 1982: 1st round, 2nd overall pick
- Drafted by: San Diego Clippers
- Playing career: 1982–2000
- Position: Power forward / small forward
- Number: 34, 35

Career history
- 1982–1984: San Diego Clippers
- 1984–1989: Milwaukee Bucks
- 1989–1995: San Antonio Spurs
- 1995–1996: Milwaukee Bucks
- 1996–1997: Seattle SuperSonics
- 1997–1998: Philadelphia 76ers
- 1998: New York Knicks
- 1999–2000: Golden State Warriors

Career highlights
- 2× NBA All-Star (1985, 1989); All-NBA Second Team (1985); All-NBA Third Team (1989); NBA Rookie of the Year (1983); NBA All-Rookie First Team (1983); Consensus first-team All-American (1982); No. 32 retired by DePaul Blue Demons (2024)

Career NBA statistics
- Points: 19,460 (16.4 ppg)
- Rebounds: 8,630 (7.3 rpg)
- Steals: 1,255 (1.1 spg)
- Stats at NBA.com
- Stats at Basketball Reference

Robert Terrell Cummings (born March 15, 1961) is an American former professional basketball player who played 18 seasons in the National Basketball Association (NBA). Cummings was voted Rookie of the Year and was a two-time All-Star, a two-time All-NBA selection and was a lead player on several postseason teams while in Milwaukee and San Antonio.

== College Years ==
Born in Chicago and a graduate of Carver High School, Cummings attended DePaul University from 1979 to 1982. He averaged 16.4 points per game over 85 games and entered the 1982 NBA draft after departing from school.

== NBA ==
=== San Diego Clippers ===
He was selected in the first round by the San Diego Clippers as the second overall pick, right after James Worthy was selected by the Clippers’ eventual crosstown rivals, the Lakers. Before the season even began, Cummings’ bumped heads with San Diego's now-infamous owner, Donald Sterling. While Sterling had training camp conducted at a naval base, he made all players do their own laundry. As a result of that, and other tense exchanges, Cummings’ agent tried to negotiate a one-year deal to get his client away from the Clippers as soon as possible. The two sides eventually agreed to a four-year contract during the preseason.

In his inaugural 1982–83 season, he won the NBA Rookie of the Year Award after putting up 23.7 points and 10.4 rebounds per game. These figures would turn out to be the highest of his career in those categories. On March 9, 1983, Cummings scored a then career best 39 points, along with grabbing 18 rebounds, during a 119–114 loss to the Los Angeles Lakers. Late in his rookie season, Cummings suffered from heartbeat irregularities, which would keep him out the remaining two weeks of the season. The team lost every game without him.

=== Milwaukee Bucks ===
After the next season (1983–84), Cummings was traded to the Milwaukee Bucks, where he would continue to average above 20 points and 8 rebounds for four out of his five years on the team.

In the 1985 NBA playoffs, Cummings outpointed then-rookie Michael Jordan 29.9 to 29.3 in a 3–1 series win for the Milwaukee Bucks over the Chicago Bulls. It would be the only time Jordan's career he would not lead all scorers in a postseason series he played in. The Bucks would lose in the next round in an upset to the lower seeded Philadelphia 76ers in a 4–0 sweep.

The following season, Cummings and future Hall of Fame-teammate Sidney Moncrief led the Bucks to a 57–25 record and an Eastern Conference Finals appearance. On January 6, 1986, Cummings scored 16 points, grabbed 17 rebounds, and recorded 4 assists in a win against the Cleveland Cavaliers. On April 22, 1986, during that season's playoffs, Cummings scored 23 points, grabbed 11 rebounds, and recorded a postseason career-high 3 blocks in the final game of a 3–0 first round sweep of the New Jersey Nets. In the following round, Cummings played the lead role in the Bucks advancing past Julius Erving and the 76ers in a contested seven games series, while his co-star Moncrief missed four games due to injury. Cummings led all scorers with 27 points in Milwaukee's 113-112 Game 7 win over Philadelphia, despite playing through a dislocated finger. However, in a familiar pattern for the 1980s Bucks, they would ultimately fail to reach the NBA Finals, falling to the NBA runner-up Boston Celtics.

On January 9, 1987, Cummings grabbed a career high 24 rebounds, alongside scoring 28 points, in a 100–92 loss to the Washington Bullets. On January 16, 1987, in what was arguably the best game of his career, Cummings recorded a triple double with 39 points, 15 rebounds, and 10 assists, while adding a career-high 6 steals in a 124–122 loss versus the Dallas Mavericks. Both Sidney Moncrief and Paul Pressey were out with injuries, and only one teammate of Cummings’ (Ricky Pierce, 27 points) scored more than 14 points. That postseason, Cummings and the Bucks again advanced past Philadelphia, as he averaged 21.4 points and 6.2 rebounds per game. On May 10, 1987, Cummings scored 31 points in an Eastern Semifinals Game 4 138–137 overtime loss against the Boston Celtics. The Bucks would eventually lose the series in 7 games.

On March 1, 1989, Cummings scored 38 points and grabbed 10 rebounds in a 121–111 win against the New York Knicks.

As a Buck, Cummings was selected to play in the 1984–85 and 1988–89 NBA All-Star Games.

=== San Antonio Spurs ===
Cummings was traded to the San Antonio Spurs on May 28, 1989, sent with a 1990 2nd round draft pick (Tony Massenburg was later selected) for Cadillac Anderson, Alvin Robertson, and a 1989 2nd round draft pick (Frank Kornet was later selected).

His first season in San Antonio, alongside David Robinson and Maurice Cheeks, saw the Spurs surge from 21 wins to a remarkable 56. That season, Cummings set a career high in points scored in a single game, with 52 in a 129–95 win over the Charlotte Hornets.

He would remain in San Antonio for six years. His scoring and rebounding averages for the 1989–90 through 1991–92 seasons were close to 20 and 8, respectively, and he helped his team to consecutive 50-win seasons and playoff appearances.

Cummings suffered a serious knee injury in the summer of 1992 in a casual pickup game. He would miss the first 74 regular-season games. Upon his return to the lineup, he could no longer put up near-All-Star numbers, and from then on he would appear as a reserve off the bench. Cummings would play in San Antonio until 1994–95.

=== Return to Bucks ===
In November 1995, he rejoined the Milwaukee Bucks. He played 81 games, averaging 8.0 points in 21 minutes on the court.

=== Seattle Supersonics ===
In January 1997 he signed with the Seattle SuperSonics as a free agent. He contributed as a role player helping the Sonics reach the Western Conference Semi-finals, where they lost to the Houston Rockets in 7 games.

=== Philadelphia 76ers/ New York Knicks ===
He signed with the Philadelphia 76ers in September 1997. He played in 44 games, averaging 5.3 points, before being dealt to the New York Knicks just before the trade deadline in February 1998, for Herb Williams and Ron Grandison. He played in 30 games with New York.

=== Golden State Warriors ===
Before the lockout ending in 1999, he was traded by the Knicks along with John Starks and Chris Mills to the Golden State Warriors for Latrell Sprewell. He played two seasons for the Warriors, closing out his career averaging 8.4 PPG and 4.9 RPG in 18 minutes a night at a 38 year-old in 1999–2000.

=== Career totals ===
In 18 seasons, Cummings played in 1,183 games, and scored 19,460 points, placing him 57th on the list of NBA all-time regular-season scoring leaders, as of December 2022. He finished with averages of 16.4 points and 7.3 rebounds per game.

Predominantly a power forward, Cummings tallied 8,630 total rebounds (3,183 offensive, 5,447 defensive), and 1,255 steals, and had .484 field goal (8,045 for 16,628) and .706 free throw (3,326 for 4,711) percentages over 33,898 minutes played

== Personal life ==
Cummings wanted to be a professional hockey player growing up, and had not attempted playing competitive basketball until an unexpected high school growth-spurt.

On April 4, 1985, Cummings sang the national anthem in Milwaukee before playing in a home game versus the Detroit Pistons. In December 1989, Cummings and several Spurs teammates released a Christmas song.

Cummings has been an ordained Pentecostal minister since 1977 and performed the wedding of former teammate Sean Elliott. He has three sons, Antonio, T. J., and Shawn.

Cummings released an album, T.C. Finally in early 2007, of songs which he wrote, sang, and played keyboards. The album is reminiscent of the R&B/soul styles of musicians such as Marvin Gaye, Al Green, and Sam Cooke.

== NBA career statistics ==
Legend
GP	Games played	GS	Games started	MPG	Minutes per game
FG%	Field goal percentage	3P%	3-point field goal percentage	FT%	Free throw percentage
RPG	Rebounds per game	APG	Assists per game	SPG	Steals per game
BPG	Blocks per game	PPG	Points per game	**Bold**	Career high
*	Led the league

=== Regular season ===
Year	Team	GP	GS	MPG	FG%	3P%	FT%	RPG	APG	SPG	BPG	PPG
1982–83	San Diego	70	69	**36.2**	**.523**	.000	.709	**10.6**	2.5	**1.8**	.9	**23.7**
1983–84	San Diego	81	80	35.9	.494	.000	.720	9.6	1.7	1.1	.7	22.9
1984–85	Milwaukee	79	78	34.5	.495	.000	.741	9.1	**2.9**	1.5	.8	23.6
1985–86	Milwaukee	**82**	**82**	32.5	.474	.000	.656	8.5	2.4	1.5	.6	19.8
1986–87	Milwaukee	**82**	77	33.8	.511	.000	.662	8.5	2.8	1.6	**1.0**	20.8
1987–88	Milwaukee	76	76	34.6	.485	.333	.665	7.3	2.4	1.0	.6	21.3
1988–89	Milwaukee	80	78	35.3	.467	.467	.787	8.1	2.5	1.3	.9	22.9
1989–90	San Antonio	81	78	34.8	.475	.322	.780	8.4	2.7	1.4	.6	22.4
1990–91	San Antonio	67	62	32.8	.484	.212	.683	7.8	2.3	.9	.4	17.6
1991–92	San Antonio	70	67	30.7	.488	.385	.711	9.0	1.5	.8	.5	17.3
1992–93	San Antonio	8	0	9.5	.379	–	.500	2.4	.5	.1	.1	3.4
1993–94	San Antonio	59	29	19.2	.428	.000	.589	5.0	.8	.5	.2	7.3
1994–95	San Antonio	76	20	16.8	.483	–	.585	5.0	.8	.5	.3	6.8
1995–96	Milwaukee	81	13	21.9	.462	.143	.650	5.5	1.1	.7	.4	8.0
1996–97	Seattle	45	3	18.4	.486	.600	.695	4.1	.9	.7	.2	8.2
1997–98	Philadelphia	44	2	14.9	.458	.000	.672	3.4	.5	.5	.1	5.3
1997–98	New York	30	1	17.6	.477	–	.700	4.5	.9	.5	.2	7.8
1998–99	Golden State	50*	0	20.2	.439	**1.000**	.711	5.1	1.2	.9	.2	9.1
1999–00	Golden State	22	0	18.1	.429	–	**.821**	4.9	1.0	.6	.4	8.4
Career		1,183	815	28.7	.484	.295	.706	7.3	1.9	1.1	.5	16.4
All-Star		2	0	17.5	.423	–	.833	6.0	.5	1.5	1.0	13.5

=== Playoffs ===
Year	Team	GP	GS	MPG	FG%	3P%	FT%	RPG	APG	SPG	BPG	PPG
1985	Milwaukee	8	8	38.9	**.577**	.000	.828	8.8	2.5	1.5	.9	**27.5**
1986	Milwaukee	14	**14**	36.4	.514	–	.694	9.9	**3.0**	1.4	1.1	21.6
1987	Milwaukee	12	10	36.9	.488	–	.687	7.9	2.3	1.0	1.1	22.3
1988	Milwaukee	5	5	38.6	.562	–	.659	7.8	2.6	**1.8**	.6	25.8
1989	Milwaukee	5	4	24.8	.362	.000	**.875**	6.6	1.4	.6	.0	12.8
1990	San Antonio	10	10	37.5	.528	**.200**	.808	9.4	2.2	.7	.4	24.9
1991	San Antonio	4	4	31.0	.510	.000	.500	9.3	1.0	.8	.5	14.8
1992	San Antonio	3	3	**40.7**	.515	.000	.500	**11.3**	2.3	1.3	**1.3**	26.0
1993	San Antonio	10	0	13.8	.443	.000	.625	3.9	.5	.3	.1	6.7
1994	San Antonio	4	1	18.0	.500	–	.833	6.3	.5	1.3	.8	8.0
1995	San Antonio	**15**	2	9.0	.375	.000	.733	2.1	.3	.3	.1	3.9
1997	Seattle	12	6	24.3	.489	–	.667	6.0	1.2	.9	.5	8.8
1998	New York	8	1	15.0	.441	–	.250	4.4	.6	.5	.3	4.0
Career		110	68	26.9	.502	.091	.706	6.7	1.6	.9	.6	15.1

== See also ==
- List of NBA career personal fouls leaders
- List of NBA rookie single-season scoring leaders
