= Wayne Sappleton =

Jamaican basketball player

Personal information
- Born: November 17, 1960 (age 65) Kingston, Jamaica
- Listed height: 6 ft 9 in (2.06 m)
- Listed weight: 215 lb (98 kg)

Career information
- High school: Ardenne (Kingston, Jamaica)
- College: Loyola Chicago (1978–1982)
- NBA draft: 1982: 2nd round, 38th overall pick
- Drafted by: Golden State Warriors
- Playing career: 1982–1993
- Position: Power forward
- Number: 44

Career history
- 1982–1984: AMG Sebastiani Rieti
- 1984–1985: New Jersey Nets
- 1985–1986: Allibert Livorno
- 1986–1989: Sangiorgese
- 1989–1991: Corona Cremona
- 1991–1993: CB Llíria

Career highlights
- Horizon League Player of the Year (1982)
- Stats at NBA.com
- Stats at Basketball Reference

Wayne B. Sappleton (born November 17, 1960) is a Jamaican former professional basketball player, formerly of the NBA's New Jersey Nets. A 6'9 power forward, Sappleton was a star at Loyola University Chicago from 1978 to 1982.

== Collegiate career ==
Sappleton grew up in Kingston, Jamaica where he attended Ardenne High School. He eventually moved to the U.S. to play for the Loyola Ramblers from 1978 to 1982 and was the Midwestern City Conference (now the Horizon League) Player of the Year in 1982. While at Loyola, Sappleton twice finished second in the NCAA in rebounding, in 1981 and 1982.

== Professional career ==
After completing his collegiate eligibility, Sappleton was drafted by the Golden State Warriors in the 2nd round (38th pick overall) in the 1982 NBA draft, but his rights were traded to the New Jersey Nets. After a stop in Italy, Sappleton played in 33 games over the 1984-85 season. Sappleton averaged 2.9 points and 2.3 rebounds per game over his NBA career.

After the NBA, Sappleton played basketball for several more clubs in Italy.

== Career statistics ==
Legend
GP	Games played	GS	Games started	MPG	Minutes per game
FG%	Field goal percentage	3P%	3-point field goal percentage	FT%	Free throw percentage
RPG	Rebounds per game	APG	Assists per game	SPG	Steals per game
BPG	Blocks per game	PPG	Points per game	**Bold**	Career high

=== NBA ===
==== Regular season ====
Year	Team	GP	GS	MPG	FG%	3P%	FT%	RPG	APG	SPG	BPG	PPG
1984–85	New Jersey	33	0	9.0	.471	–	.412	2.3	.2	.2	.1	2.9
