= Mike Wilson (basketball) =

American basketball player (born 1959)

Personal information
- Born: September 15, 1959 (age 67) Memphis, Tennessee, U.S.
- Listed height: 6 ft 4 in (1.93 m)
- Listed weight: 175 lb (79 kg)

Career information
- High school: Manassas (Memphis, Tennessee)
- College: Marquette (1978–1982)
- NBA draft: 1982: 3rd round, 47th overall pick
- Drafted by: Cleveland Cavaliers
- Playing career: 1983–1987
- Position: Point guard / shooting guard
- Number: 2, 22, 15

Career history
- 1982–1983: Wisconsin Flyers
- 1983: Washington Bullets
- 1983–1985: Sarasota Stingers
- 1984: Cleveland Cavaliers
- 1984–1986: New Jersey Nets
- 1986: Charleston Gunners
- 1986–1988: Topeka Sizzlers
- 1987: Atlanta Hawks
- 1988: Rochester Flyers
- Stats at NBA.com
- Stats at Basketball Reference

Michael Wilson (born September 15, 1959) is an American former basketball player. He played college basketball for Marquette University from 1978 to 1982. Wilson averaged 10.9 points, 3.8 assists, 3.5 rebounds and 2.3 steals over his 119-game college career. Wilson was captain of the Marquette team in 1980–81 and 1981–82 and he led the team in scoring his senior season with 16.1 points per game.

Wilson played in the National Basketball Association (NBA). Wilson was drafted in the third round of the 1982 NBA draft by the Cleveland Cavaliers with the 47th overall pick He first played with the Washington Bullets in 1983, played with the Cavaliers in 1984. Later, he played with the New Jersey Nets in 1984–85,1986–1987 and the Atlanta Hawks in 1986–1987.

Wilson also played 144 games in the Continental Basketball Association (CBA). He averaged 16.6 points and 3.8 assists per game over five seasons for the Wisconsin Flyers, Sarasota Stingers, Charleston Gunners, Topeka Sizzlers and Rochester Flyers from 1982 to 1988.

== Career statistics ==
Legend
GP	Games played	GS	Games started	MPG	Minutes per game
FG%	Field goal percentage	3P%	3-point field goal percentage	FT%	Free throw percentage
RPG	Rebounds per game	APG	Assists per game	SPG	Steals per game
BPG	Blocks per game	PPG	Points per game	**Bold**	Career high

=== NBA ===
==== Regular season ====
Year	Team	GP	GS	MPG	FG%	3P%	FT%	RPG	APG	SPG	BPG	PPG
1983–84	Washington	6	0	4.3	.000	.000	.500	.2	.5	.0	.0	.2
1984–85	Cleveland	**11**	0	**15.9**	**.500**	–	.767	**1.6**	**2.2**	**.9**	**.3**	**7.0**
1984–85	New Jersey	8	0	11.5	.391	–	.667	**1.6**	1.4	.5	**.3**	2.8
1986–87	New Jersey	5	0	8.6	.375	–	**1.000**	.8	1.2	.2	.0	1.6
1986–87	Atlanta	2	0	1.0	.000	–	–	.0	.5	.0	.0	.0
Career		32	0	10.6	.438	.000	.750	1.1	1.4	.5	.2	3.4
