= Brook Steppe =

American basketball player

Personal information
- Born: November 7, 1959 (age 67) Chapel Hill, North Carolina, U.S.
- Listed height: 6 ft 5 in (1.96 m)
- Listed weight: 195 lb (88 kg)

Career information
- High school: North Springs (Atlanta, Georgia)
- College: Dekalb Central CC (1977–1978); Georgia Tech (1978–1982)
- NBA draft: 1982: 1st round, 17th overall pick
- Drafted by: Kansas City Kings
- Playing career: 1982–1995
- Position: Shooting guard / small forward
- Number: 14, 11, 31, 25, 7

Career history
- 1982–1983: Kansas City Kings
- 1983–1984: Indiana Pacers
- 1984–1985: Detroit Pistons
- 1985–1986: Tampa Bay Thrillers
- 1986–1987: Rockford Lightning
- 1986–1987: Sacramento Kings
- 1987–1988: Paris Basket Racing
- 1988–1989: Pensacola Tornados
- 1989: Portland Trail Blazers
- 1989–1990: Hapoel Tel Aviv
- 1991–1992: Fort Wayne Fury
- 1992–1993: Capital Region Pontiacs
- 1993–1994: Hartford Hellcats
- 1994: Rochester Renegade
- 1994–1995: Fort Wayne Fury

Career highlights
- All-CBA First Team (1989); CBA scoring champion (1989); First-team All-ACC (1982)
- Stats at NBA.com
- Stats at Basketball Reference

Michael Holbrook "Brook" Steppe (born November 7, 1959) is an American former basketball player in the National Basketball Association (NBA). He was a 6'5" 190 lb (86 kg) shooting guard. Born in Chapel Hill, North Carolina, Steppe played competitively from 1977 to 1982 at DeKalb Central Community College and Georgia Institute of Technology, where he was twice named first-team All-ACC. He was selected with the 17th pick in the 1982 NBA draft by the Kansas City Kings.

He played five NBA seasons with as many teams until 1989.

He was once suspended for one game without pay by the Kansas City Kings during his rookie season in 1983 when he missed a plane from Atlanta to Kansas City.

Steppe played in the Continental Basketball Association (CBA) for the Tampa Bay Thrillers, Rockford Lightning, Pensacola Tornados, Fort Wayne Fury, Capital Region Pontiacs, Hartford Hellcats and Rochester Renegade from 1985 to 1995. He was selected to the All-CBA First Team in 1989.

Following his playing career, Steppe got into coaching. He spent four seasons as an assistant men's basketball coach at Kennesaw State.

== Career statistics ==
Legend
| GP | Games played | GS | Games started | MPG | Minutes per game |
| FG% | Field goal percentage | 3P% | 3-point field goal percentage | FT% | Free throw percentage |
| RPG | Rebounds per game | APG | Assists per game | SPG | Steals per game |
| BPG | Blocks per game | PPG | Points per game | **Bold** | Career high |

=== NBA ===
==== Regular season ====
| Year | Team | GP | GS | MPG | FG% | 3P% | FT% | RPG | APG | SPG | BPG | PPG |
|---|---|---|---|---|---|---|---|---|---|---|---|---|
| 1982–83 | Kansas City | **62** | 6 | 9.8 | **.477** | .143 | .760 | 1.2 | 1.1 | .4 | .0 | 4.0 |
| 1983–84 | Indiana | 61 | **13** | 14.0 | .471 | .000 | .832 | **2.0** | 1.3 | **.6** | **.1** | 7.0 |
| 1984–85 | Detroit | 54 | 0 | 9.0 | .466 | .000 | .837 | 1.1 | .7 | .3 | **.1** | 4.7 |
| 1986–87 | Sacramento | 34 | 7 | **19.6** | **.477** | .333 | .830 | 1.8 | **2.4** | .5 | **.1** | **7.8** |
| 1988–89 | Portland | 27 | 2 | 9.0 | .423 | **.556** | **.865** | 1.2 | .6 | .4 | .0 | 3.8 |
| Career | | 238 | 28 | 12.0 | .469 | .310 | .820 | 1.4 | 1.2 | .4 | .1 | 5.4 |

==== Playoffs ====
| Year | Team | GP | GS | MPG | FG% | 3P% | FT% | RPG | APG | SPG | BPG | PPG |
|---|---|---|---|---|---|---|---|---|---|---|---|---|
| 1985 | Detroit | 4 | 0 | 5.0 | .286 | .000 | .667 | .8 | .5 | .0 | .0 | 2.0 |
