= Harry Kelly (basketball) =

American basketball player

Personal information
- Born: 1961 (age 64–65) Jackson, Mississippi, U.S.
- Listed height: 6 ft 7 in (2.01 m)
- Listed weight: 205 lb (93 kg)

Career information
- High school: Wingfield (Jackson, Mississippi)
- College: Texas Southern (1979–1983)
- NBA draft: 1983: 4th round, 81st overall pick
- Drafted by: Atlanta Hawks
- Position: Small forward

Career highlights
- 2× NCAA scoring champion (1982, 1983); 3× SWAC Player of the Year (1981–1983); 4× First-team All-SWAC (1980–1983)
- Stats at Basketball Reference

Harry "Machine Gun" Kelly (born 1961) is an American former basketball player. He played college basketball for the Texas Southern Tigers from 1979 to 1983.

== College career ==
Kelly was born in Jackson, Mississippi. He enrolled at Texas Southern University in 1979, and played basketball for the team for four seasons. A counselor gave him his nickname "Machine Gun Kelly" in his freshman year due to his prolific scoring; in his college career he scored 3,066 points — the sixth most in NCAA Division I history — and averaged 27.9 points per game. In addition, he achieved a career total of 1,085 rebounds, averaging 9.9 per game, making him the first player to score over 3,000 points and grab 1,000 rebounds in NCAA history. He was named Southwestern Athletic Conference Player of the Year three times and received the John McLendon Award, which honors the best player at a historically black college, in 1982 and 1983. Kelly was a four-time All-Southwestern Athletic Conference (SWAC) selection; a feat that only he and Alphonso Ford have accomplished.

== Professional career ==
Kelly was selected in the fourth round of the 1983 NBA draft by the Atlanta Hawks. He was cut from the team before the season in favor of Doc Rivers, Randy Wittman and center John Pinone, who were all selected before him. He subsequently played briefly in California's Summer Pro League and Italy's Lega Basket Serie A. In 1984 he started a career in Houston's Department of Public Works and Engineering.

== See also ==
- List of NCAA Division I men's basketball players with 60 or more points in a game
- List of NCAA Division I men's basketball players with 2000 points and 1000 rebounds
- List of NCAA Division I men's basketball career scoring leaders
- List of NCAA Division I men's basketball season scoring leaders
