= Bill Garnett =

American basketball player (born 1960)

Personal information
- Born: April 22, 1960 (age 66) Kansas City, Missouri, U.S.
- Listed height: 6 ft 9 in (2.06 m)
- Listed weight: 225 lb (102 kg)

Career information
- High school: Regis Jesuit (Denver, Colorado)
- College: Wyoming (1978–1982)
- NBA draft: 1982: 1st round, 4th overall pick
- Drafted by: Dallas Mavericks
- Playing career: 1982–1989
- Position: Power forward
- Number: 20

Career history

Playing
- 1982–1984: Dallas Mavericks
- 1984–1986: Indiana Pacers
- 1986–1987: Berloni Torino
- 1987–1988: Yoga Bologna
- 1988–1989: Glaxo Verona

Coaching
- 1994–1995: Metro State (assistant)

Career highlights
- Second-team All-American – USBWA (1982); WAC Player of the Year (1982); First-team All-WAC (1982); Second-team All-WAC (1981)
- Stats at NBA.com
- Stats at Basketball Reference

William Patrick Garnett (born April 22, 1960) is an American former professional basketball player who was selected by the Dallas Mavericks in the first round (4th overall) of the 1982 NBA draft. Born in Kansas City, Missouri, Garnett is a 6'9" small forward from the University of Wyoming, Garnett played in 4 NBA seasons from 1982 to 1986 for the Mavericks and Indiana Pacers. In his NBA career, Garnett played in 300 games and scored a total of 1,638 points.

== Career statistics ==
Legend
GP	Games played	GS	Games started	MPG	Minutes per game
FG%	Field goal percentage	3P%	3-point field goal percentage	FT%	Free throw percentage
RPG	Rebounds per game	APG	Assists per game	SPG	Steals per game
BPG	Blocks per game	PPG	Points per game	**Bold**	Career high

=== NBA ===
==== Regular season ====
Year	Team	GP	GS	MPG	FG%	3P%	FT%	RPG	APG	SPG	BPG	PPG
1982–83	Dallas	75	13	18.8	**.533**	.000	**.741**	**5.4**	1.4	**.6**	**.9**	6.3
1983–84	Dallas	**80**	**34**	**19.1**	.472	.000	.733	4.1	**1.6**	**.6**	.8	5.1
1984–85	Indiana	65	13	17.3	.481	.000	.690	4.4	1.0	.4	.2	**6.4**
1985–86	Indiana	**80**	2	15.0	.469	.000	.716	3.4	1.2	.5	.3	4.3
Career		300	62	17.5	.490	.000	.720	4.3	1.3	.5	.6	5.5

==== Playoffs ====
Year	Team	GP	MPG	FG%	3P%	FT%	RPG	APG	SPG	BPG	PPG
1984	Dallas	8	9.3	.500	1.000	.875	2.8	.5	.0	.3	4.8
