= Albert Culton =

American basketball player

Personal information
- Born: Ennis, Texas, U.S.
- Listed height: 6 ft 7 in (2.01 m)
- Listed weight: 200 lb (91 kg)

Career information
- High school: Ennis (Ennis, Texas)
- College: Texas A&M (1977–1979); UT Arlington (1980–1982)
- NBA draft: 1982: 10th round, 209th overall pick
- Drafted by: Dallas Mavericks
- Position: Forward

Career highlights
- Southland Player of the Year (1982); 2× First-team All-Southland (1981, 1982); Southland Freshman of the Year (1981)
- Stats at Basketball Reference

Albert Culton is an American former basketball player. He played college basketball for the Texas A&M Aggies and UT Arlington Mavericks.

Culton attended Ennis High School in Ennis, Texas. He averaged 22.6 points and 19.6 rebounds per game as a senior while he led his team to its first district title and earned first-team all-state honors. He was heavily recruited by colleges, including most teams in the Southwest Conference, and signed a letter of intent with the Texas A&M Aggies on April 14, 1977. He transferred to play for the UT Arlington Mavericks and was named the Southland Conference Freshman of the Year in 1981. He averaged 18.0 points and 9.6 rebounds per game during the 1981–82 season and was selected as the Southland Player of the Year.

Culton was selected by the Dallas Mavericks as the 209th overall pick in the 1982 NBA draft. He played for the Harlem Globetrotters.
