= 1981–82 UAB Blazers men's basketball team =

American college basketball season

1981–82 UAB Blazers men's basketball

Sun Belt tournament champions Sun Belt Regular season champions

NCAA tournament, Elite Eight
- Conference: Sun Belt Conference

Ranking
- AP: No. 17
- Record: 25–6 (9–1 Sun Belt)
- Head coach: Gene Bartow (4th season)
- Home arena: BJCC Coliseum

1981–82 Sun Belt Conference men's basketball standings
	Conf.				Overall
Team	W		L	PCT	W		L	PCT
No. 17 UAB †	9	–	1	.900	25	–	6	.806
VCU	7	–	3	.700	17	–	11	.607
Jacksonville	5	–	5	.500	14	–	13	.519
South Florida	4	–	6	.400	17	–	11	.607
UNC Charlotte	3	–	7	.300	15	–	12	.556
South Alabama	2	–	8	.200	12	–	16	.429
† 1982 Sun Belt Conference tournament winner Rankings from AP Poll

The 1981–82 UAB Blazers men's basketball team represented the University of Alabama at Birmingham as a member of the Sun Belt Conference during the 1981–82 NCAA Division I men's basketball season. This was head coach Gene Bartow's fourth season at UAB, and the Blazers played their home games at BJCC Coliseum. They finished the season 25–6, 9–1 in Sun Belt play and won the Sun Belt tournament. They received an automatic bid to the NCAA tournament as No. 4 seed in the Mideast region. After beating No. 5 seed Indiana in the second round, UAB upset No. 1 seed Virginia to reach the Elite Eight. The Blazers fell to Louisville in the Mideast regional final, 75–68. As of 2025, that is the furthest a UAB men’s team has advanced in NCAA Tournament play.

== Roster ==
1981–82 UAB Blazers men's basketball team
Players
Coaches

Pos.	#	Name	Height	Weight	Year	Hometown
G	11	Murry Bartow	5 ft 10 in (1.78 m)	160 lb (73 kg)	Fr	Birmingham, Alabama
F	12	Marvin Ray Johnson	6 ft 7 in (2.01 m)	—	Fr	Birmingham, Alabama
G	14	Jonathan Nicholas	6 ft 3 in (1.91 m)	—	Sr	Brooklyn, New York
G	15	Luellen Foster	6 ft 4 in (1.93 m)	165 lb (75 kg)	So	Birmingham, Alabama
G	20	Oliver Robinson	6 ft 4 in (1.93 m)	180 lb (82 kg)	Jr	Birmingham, Alabama
G	21	Scott Simcik	6 ft 1 in (1.85 m)	—	Jr	Simi Valley, California
G	24	Raymond Gause	6 ft 5 in (1.96 m)	195 lb (88 kg)	Sr	Memphis, Tennessee
F	33	Scott McCabe	6 ft 7 in (2.01 m)	—	Fr	Peoria, Illinois
F	40	Chris Giles	6 ft 8 in (2.03 m)	200 lb (91 kg)	Sr	Birmingham, Alabama
C	42	Lex Drum	6 ft 10 in (2.08 m)	—	Jr	Poplar Bluff, Missouri
F	44	Craig Lane	6 ft 6 in (1.98 m)	210 lb (95 kg)	Sr	Quincy, Florida
C	52	Donnie Speer	6 ft 8 in (2.03 m)	225 lb (102 kg)	Sr	Sylacauga, Alabama
C	55	Norman Anchrum	6 ft 10 in (2.08 m)	225 lb (102 kg)	Sr	Birmingham, Alabama

Head coach

- Gene Bartow

Assistant coach(es)

Legend

- (C) Team captain
- (S) Suspended
- (I) Ineligible
- (W) Walk-on
- Injured
- Current redshirt

Roster

== Schedule and results ==
Date time, TV	Rank^{#}	Opponent^{#}	Result	Record	Site (attendance) city, state
Regular season
Nov 27, 1981*	No. 14	Benedictine	W 100–63	1–0	Birmingham-Jefferson Civic Center (5,055); Birmingham, Alabama
Nov 28, 1981*	No. 14	Pittsburgh	W 78–62	2–0	Birmingham-Jefferson Civic Center (6,053); Birmingham, Alabama
Dec 5, 1981*	No. 11	Ole Miss	W 72–58	3–0	Birmingham-Jefferson Civic Center (12,785); Birmingham, Alabama
Dec 12, 1981*	No. 9	at No. 4 Wichita State	L 60–75	3–1	Levitt Arena (10,666); Wichita, Kansas
Dec 14, 1981*	No. 16	Roosevelt	W 86–40	4–1	Birmingham-Jefferson Civic Center (2,891); Birmingham, Alabama
Dec 18, 1981*	No. 16	vs. Southern Miss; Cotton States Classic	W 71–56	5–1	(7,162); Atlanta, Georgia
Dec 19, 1981*	No. 16	vs. Georgia; Cotton States Classic	L 72–76	5–2	(7,450); Atlanta, Georgia
Dec 22, 1981*	No. 19	Chico State	W 80–60	6–2	Birmingham-Jefferson Civic Center (3,217); Birmingham, Alabama
Dec 27, 1981*	No. 19	vs. No. 9 Missouri; Winston Tire Classic	L 80–98	6–3	(7,364); Los Angeles, California
Dec 28, 1981*		vs. Michigan; Winston Tire Classic	W 73–72	7–3	(7,774); Los Angeles, California
Dec 30, 1981*		Chattanooga	W 76–50	8–3	Birmingham-Jefferson Civic Center (5,318); Birmingham, Alabama
Jan 2, 1982		VCU	L 54–55	8–4 (0–1)	Birmingham-Jefferson Civic Center (7,031); Birmingham, Alabama
Jan 4, 1982		Jacksonville	W 82–62	6–4 (1–1)	Birmingham-Jefferson Civic Center (6,092); Birmingham, Alabama
Jan 9, 1982		South Alabama	W 78–59	10–4 (2–1)	Birmingham-Jefferson Civic Center (10,019); Birmingham, Alabama
Jan 11, 1982		UNC Charlotte	W 85–81	11–4 (3–1)	Birmingham-Jefferson Civic Center (5,516); Birmingham, Alabama
Jan 13, 1982*		Utica	W 73–44	12–4	Birmingham-Jefferson Civic Center (489); Birmingham, Alabama
Jan 16, 1982		at South Florida	W 54–49	13–4 (4–1)	Sun Dome (8,106); Tampa, Florida
Jan 23, 1982*		at No. 4 DePaul	L 68–79	13–5	Rosemont Horizon (14,187); Rosemont, Illinois
Jan 29, 1982		South Florida	W 59–51	14–5 (5–1)	Birmingham-Jefferson Civic Center (8,491); Birmingham, Alabama
Feb 1, 1982		at Jacksonville	W 59–57 ^{OT}	15–5 (6–1)	Birmingham-Jefferson Civic Center (3,497); Birmingham, Alabama
Feb 4, 1982*		Mississippi Valley State	W 102–77	16–5	Birmingham-Jefferson Civic Center (3,755); Birmingham, Alabama
Feb 7, 1982		at South Alabama	W 86–82	17–5 (7–1)	Jaguar Gym (7,512); Mobile, Alabama
Feb 11, 1982*		at Saint Louis	W 79–63	18–5	St. Louis Arena (1,222); St. Louis, Missouri
Feb 20, 1982		vs. VCU	W 56–55	19–5 (8–1)	Richmond Coliseum (5,600); Richmond, Virginia
Feb 21, 1982		at UNC Charlotte	W 78–73	20–5 (9–1)	Charlotte Coliseum (4,160); Charlotte, North Carolina
Feb 23, 1982*		Samford	W 40–27	21–5	Birmingham-Jefferson Civic Center (7,198); Birmingham, Alabama
Sun Belt tournament
Feb 27, 1982*	(1)	(4) South Florida; Semifinals	W 66–56	22–5	Birmingham-Jefferson Civic Center (11,658); Birmingham, Alabama
Feb 28, 1982*	(1)	(2) VCU; Championship Game	W 94–83	23–5	Birmingham-Jefferson Civic Center (11,408); Birmingham, Alabama
NCAA tournament
Mar 13, 1982*	(4 ME) No. 17	vs. (5 ME) Indiana; Second Round	W 80–70	24–5	Memorial Gymnasium (14,761); Nashville, Tennessee
Mar 18, 1982*	(4 ME) No. 17	vs. (1 ME) No. 3 Virginia; Mideast Regional semifinal – Sweet Sixteen	W 68–66	25–5	Birmingham-Jefferson Civic Center (16,754); Birmingham, Alabama
Mar 20, 1982*	(4 ME) No. 17	vs. (3 ME) No. 20 Louisville; Mideast Regional final – Elite Eight	L 68–75	25–6	Birmingham-Jefferson Civic Center (16,754); Birmingham, Alabama
*Non-conference game. ^{#}Rankings from AP poll. (#) Tournament seedings in parentheses. ME=Mideast.

== Awards and honors ==
- Oliver Robinson – Sun Belt Conference Player of the Year, Sun Belt tournament MVP
- Gene Bartow – Sun Belt Conference Coach of the Year

== NBA draft ==
Round	Pick	Player	NBA club
2	24	Oliver Robinson	San Antonio Spurs
