= 1981–82 Illinois State Redbirds men's basketball team =

American college basketball season

1981–82 Illinois State Redbirds men's basketball
- Conference: Missouri Valley Conference
- Record: 17–12 (9–7 MVC)
- Head coach: Bob Donewald (4th season)
- Assistant coaches: Pat Cunningham; Jim Platt; Terry Smith
- Home arena: Horton Field House

1981–82 Missouri Valley Conference men's basketball standings
	Conf.				Overall
Team	W		L	PCT	W		L	PCT
Bradley	13	–	3	.813	26	–	10	.722
No. 10 Tulsa †	12	–	4	.750	24	–	6	.800
Wichita State	12	–	4	.750	23	–	6	.793
New Mexico State	10	–	6	.625	17	–	11	.607
Illinois State	9	–	7	.563	17	–	12	.586
Drake	7	–	9	.438	12	–	15	.444
Southern Illinois	7	–	9	.438	11	–	16	.407
Creighton	4	–	12	.250	7	–	20	.259
Indiana State	3	–	13	.188	9	–	18	.333
West Texas State	3	–	13	.188	11	–	15	.423
† 1982 MVC tournament winner Rankings from AP Poll

The 1981–82 Illinois State Redbirds men's basketball team represented Illinois State University during the 1981–82 NCAA Division I men's basketball season. The Redbirds, led by fourth year head coach Bob Donewald, played their home games at Horton Field House and competed as a member of the Missouri Valley Conference.

They finished the season 17–12, 9–7 in conference play to finish in fifth place. They were the number four seed for the Missouri Valley Conference tournament as Wichita State University was serving the first of a two-year probation and therefore prohibited from postseason competition. They made it to the championship game before losing to the tenth ranked University of Tulsa.

== Roster ==
1981–82 Illinois State Redbirds men's basketball team
Players
Coaches

Pos.	#	Name	Height	Weight	Year	Hometown
G	34	Dale White	6 ft 5 in (1.96 m)	190 lb (86 kg)	Sr	Covington, IN
C	53	Rick Lamb	6 ft 7 in (2.01 m)	230 lb (104 kg)	Jr	Illiopolis, IL
F	44	Raynard Malaine	6 ft 6 in (1.98 m)	220 lb (100 kg)	Jr	Gary, IN
G	25	Vann Parkin (W)	—	—	Jr	Manito, IL
G	23	Dwayne Tyus	6 ft 2 in (1.88 m)	175 lb (79 kg)	Jr	Chicago, IL
F	52	Hank Cornley	6 ft 7 in (2.01 m)	220 lb (100 kg)	So	Columbus, OH
F	45	Mark Zwart	6 ft 8 in (2.03 m)	205 lb (93 kg)	So	Monona, WI
G	33	Brad Duncan	6 ft 4 in (1.93 m)	—	Fr	Anderson, IN
G	24	Rickie Johnson	6 ft 4 in (1.93 m)	—	Fr	Indianapolis, IN
G	10	Michael McKenny	6 ft 1 in (1.85 m)	—	Fr	Gary, IN
C	35	Lou Stefanovic	6 ft 8 in (2.03 m)	—	Fr	Merillville, IN

Head coach

- Bob Donewald (Hanover)

Assistant coach(es)

- Pat Cunningham (Kalamazoo)
- Jim Platt (Concordia–Chicago)
- Terry Smith (Marian (IN))

Legend

- (C) Team captain
- (S) Suspended
- (I) Ineligible
- (W) Walk-on
- Injured
- Current redshirt

== Schedule ==
Date time, TV	Rank^{#}	Opponent^{#}	Result	Record	High points	High rebounds	High assists	Site (attendance) city, state
Exhibition Season
November 19, 1981*; 7:30 pm		Team England	W 88–54		18 – Lamb, Tyus	10 – Lamb	7 – McKenny	Horton Field House (4,271); Normal, IL
Regular Season
November 28, 1981*; 7:30 pm		Mississippi Valley State	W 92–75	1–0	23 – White	11 – Lamb	–	Horton Field House (3,905); Normal, IL
December 2, 1981*; 7:30 pm		Northern Illinois	W 63–60	2–0	24 – White	9 – Lamb	–	Horton Field House (5,109); Normal, IL
December 7, 1981*; 7:30 pm		at Western Illinois	L 79–84	2–1	23 – White	12 – Lamb	–	Western Hall (5,961); Macomb, IL
December 11, 1981*; 7:00 pm		vs. Arizona State; Utah Classic [Semifinal]	L 61–63	2–2	18 – Cornley	11 – Lamb, Cornley	–	Special Events Center (11,057); Salt Lake City, UT
December 12, 1981*; 7:00 pm		vs. Fairfield; Utah Classic [Third Place]	W 81–73	3–2	16 – White	10 – Lamb	–	Special Events Center (12,509); Salt Lake City, UT
December 19, 1981*		Eastern Illinois	W 94–55	4–2	25 – Lamb	11 – Lamb	–	Lantz Arena (1,500); Charleston, IL
December 28, 1981*		at No. 13 DePaul	L 58–74	4–3	15 – Lamb	12 – Lamb	–	Rosemont Horizon (15,127); Rosemont, IL
January 2, 1982		at Southern Illinois	L 68–72	4–4 (0–1)	20 – Lamb	9 – Lamb	–	SIU Arena (2,750); Carbondale, IL
January 4, 1982; 7:30 pm		Drake	W 59–49	5–4 (1–1)	15 – Lamb	6 – Lamb, Malaine	–	Horton Field House (6,245); Normal, IL
January 8, 1982*		vs. Virginia Military Institute; Worcester County National Classic [Semifinal]	W 74–56	6–4	18 – Lamb	7 – Malaine, Johnson	–	Hart Recreation Center (3,000); Worcester, MA
January 9, 1982*		at Holy Cross; Worcester County National Classic [Final]	L 51–52	6–5	10 – Cornley	6 – Lamb	–	Hart Recreation Center (4,000); Worcester, MA
January 14, 1982; 6:30 pm		at Indiana State	W 81–63	7–5 (2–1)	22 – Lamb	8 – Lamb	–	Hulman Center (4,793); Terre Haute, IN
January 16, 1982; 2:30 pm		New Mexico State	W 72–58	8–5 (3–1)	25 – Lamb	7 – Lamb	–	Horton Field House (5,305); Normal, IL
January 18, 1982; 7:30 pm		West Texas State	W 65–53	9–5 (4–1)	22 – Lamb	12 – Lamb	–	Horton Field House (4,970); Normal, IL
January 21, 1982; 7:00 pm		at Creighton	W 68–54	10–5 (5–1)	23 – Cornley	15 – Lamb	3 – Tyus, McKenny	Omaha Civic Auditorium (5,201); Omaha, NE
January 23, 1982		at Drake	L 46–49	10–6 (5–2)	16 – Tyus	11 – Lamb	–	Veterans Memorial Auditorium (8,860); Des Monies, IA
January 28, 1982; 7:30 pm, WEEK		at Bradley	L 58–72	10–7 (5–3)	16 – Cornley	11 – Cornley	–	Robertson Memorial Field House (7,300); Peoria, IL
January 30, 1982; 2:30 pm		Indiana State	W 81–62	11–7 (6–3)	21 – Cornley	12 – Lamb	–	Horton Field House (5,705); Normal, IL
February 4, 1982; 7:30 pm		Wichita State	L 56–61	11–8 (6–4)	18 – Tyus	5 – Malaine	2 – White, Lamb, Malaine, Tyus	Horton Field House (7,039); Normal, IL
February 6, 1982; 2:30 pm		Southern Illinois	W 65–53	12–8 (7–4)	17 – Tyus	10 – Lamb	–	Horton Field House (5,191); Normal, IL
February 11, 1982		at No. 7 Tulsa	L 67–78 ^{OT}	12–9 (7–5)	18 – Tyus	13 – Lamb, Cornley	–	Tulsa Convention Center (9,119); Tulsa, OK
February 13, 1982; 2:30 pm, MVC–TV		Bradley	L 47–48	12–10 (7–6)	10 – Lamb, Malaine	7 – Cornley	–	Horton Field House (8,276); Normal, IL
February 18, 1982		at New Mexico State	L 62–65	12–11 (7–7)	20 – Lamb	10 – Lamb	–	Pan American Center (10,073); Las Cruces, NM
February 20, 1982		at West Texas State	W 51–49	13–11 (8–7)	13 – Malaine	8 – Zwart	–	WTSU Fiedhouse (2,154); Canyon, TX
February 23, 1982*; 7:30 pm		Northern Iowa	W 62–39	14–11	23 – White	10 – Zwart	–	Horton Field House (5,068); Normal, IL
February 27, 1982; 2:30 pm		Creighton	W 66–48	15–11 (9–7)	19 – McKenny	10 – Cornley	2 – Lamb, Cornley, Zwart	Horton Field House (5,305); Normal, IL
Missouri Valley Conference {MVC} tournament
March 2, 1982*; 8:00 pm	(4)	(5) Drake; Quarterfinal	W 56–43	16–11	18 – Cornley	12 – Lamb	3 – Lamb, Malaine, Tyus	Horton Field House (4,377); Normal, IL
March 4, 1982*; 8:00 pm, WEEK	(4)	at (1) Bradley; Semifinal	W 55–50 ^{2OT}	17–11	15 – Cornley	10 – Lamb	11 – McKenny	Robertson Memorial Field House (7,300); Peoria, IL
March 6, 1982*	(4)	at (2) No. 10 Tulsa; Final	L 77–90	17–12	18 – Lamb	7 – Lamb	5 – McKenny	Tulsa Convention Center (9,119); Tulsa, OK
*Non-conference game. ^{#}Rankings from AP Poll. (#) Tournament seedings in parentheses. All times are in Central Standard Time.
