= 1981–82 Iowa State Cyclones men's basketball team =

American college basketball season

1981–82 Iowa State Cyclones men's basketball
- Conference: Big Eight Conference
- Record: 10–17 (5–9 Big Eight)
- Head coach: Johnny Orr (2nd season)
- Home arena: Hilton Coliseum

1981–82 Big Eight Conference men's basketball standings
| | Conf. | | | | Overall |
| Team | W | | L | PCT | W | | L | PCT |
|---|---|---|---|---|---|---|---|---|
| No. 5 Missouri † | 12 | – | 2 | .857 | 27 | – | 4 | .871 |
| Kansas State | 10 | – | 4 | .714 | 23 | – | 8 | .742 |
| Oklahoma | 8 | – | 6 | .571 | 22 | – | 11 | .667 |
| Nebraska | 7 | – | 7 | .500 | 16 | – | 12 | .571 |
| Oklahoma State | 7 | – | 7 | .500 | 15 | – | 12 | .556 |
| Iowa State | 5 | – | 9 | .357 | 10 | – | 17 | .370 |
| Kansas | 4 | – | 10 | .286 | 13 | – | 14 | .481 |
| Colorado | 3 | – | 11 | .214 | 11 | – | 16 | .407 |
† 1982 Big Eight tournament winner Rankings from AP Poll

The 1981–82 Iowa State Cyclones men's basketball team represented Iowa State University during the 1981–82 NCAA Division I men's basketball season. The Cyclones were coached by Johnny Orr, who was in his 2nd season. They played their home games at Hilton Coliseum in Ames, Iowa.

They finished the season 10–17, 5–9 in Big Eight play to finish in sixth. The Cyclones lost in the first round of the Big Eight tournament to Oklahoma, falling 71–67.

== Roster ==
1981–82 Iowa State Cyclones men's basketball team
Players
Coaches

| Pos. | # | Name | Height | Weight | Year | Hometown |
|---|---|---|---|---|---|---|
| F | | Ron Harris (C) | 6 ft 3 in (1.91 m) | — | So |
| G | | Barry Stevens | 6 ft 5 in (1.96 m) | — | Fr |
| F | | Robert Estes | 6 ft 6 in (1.98 m) | — | Sr |
| G | | Malvin Warrick (C) | 6 ft 2 in (1.88 m) | — |
| C | | Ron Falenschek | 6 ft 11 in (2.11 m) | — | Jr |
| G | | Terrence Allen | 6 ft 0 in (1.83 m) | — | So |
| G | | Paul Beene | 5 ft 11 in (1.8 m) | — |
| C | | John Kunnert (C) | 6 ft 6 in (1.98 m) | — |
| | | Wes Wallace | — | — | Fr |
| | | Lonzell Simmons | — | — |
| | | Doug Jones | — | — |
| F | | Tom Peterson | — | — | Fr |
| | | Dave Rauker | — | — |
| F | | Ray Harris | — | — | Fr |

Head coach

- Johnny Orr (Beloit)

Assistant coach(es)

Legend

- (C) Team captain
- (S) Suspended
- (I) Ineligible
- (W) Walk-on
- Injured
- Current redshirt

== Schedule and results ==
| Date time, TV | Rank^{#} | Opponent^{#} | Result | Record | Site city, state |
Exhibition
| November 21, 1981*; 6:00 pm | | Windsor (Canada); Exhibition | W 93–80 | – | Hilton Coliseum (3,112); Ames, Iowa |
Regular season
| November 28, 1981*; 9:00 pm | | at Eastern Montana (MSU-Billings) | L 55–66 | 0–1 | The Metra (1,692); Billings, Montana |
| December 2, 1981*; 7:35 pm, Cyclone Basketball Network | | SMU | W 80–70 | 1–1 | Hilton Coliseum (8,112); Ames, Iowa |
| December 5, 1981*; 7:35 pm | | South Dakota | W 100–78 | 2–1 | Hilton Coliseum (8,437); Ames, Iowa |
| December 8, 1981*; 7:35 pm, Cyclone Basketball Network | | No. 6 Iowa; CyHawk Rivalry | L 68–79 | 2–2 | Hilton Coliseum (14,038); Ames, Iowa |
| December 12, 1981*; 7:35 pm, Cyclone Basketball Network | | at Texas | L 75–108 | 2–3 | Erwin Center (7,973); Austin, Texas |
| December 14, 1981*; 7:35 pm | | at TCU | L 63–72 | 2–4 | Daniel Meyer Coliseum (2,572); Fort Worth, Texas |
| December 19, 1981*; 7:35 pm, Heritage Cablevision | | at Drake; Iowa Big Four | L 56–72 | 2–5 | Veterans Memorial Auditorium (10,015); Des Moines, Iowa |
| December 26, 1981*; 11:00 pm | | vs. Idaho; Far West Classic Quarterfinal | L 68–88 | 2–6 | Memorial Coliseum (11,040); Portland, OR |
| December 28, 1981*; 1:00 pm | | vs. Pittsburgh; Far West Classic Consolation Semifinal | L 65–81 | 2–7 | Memorial Coliseum (3,356); Portland, OR |
| December 29, 1981*; 3:00 pm | | vs. Wisconsin; Far West Classic Consolation Seventh Place | W 103–79 | 3–7 | Memorial Coliseum (3,127); Portland, OR |
| January 6, 1982*; 7:35 pm | | Northern Iowa; Iowa Big Four | W 78–65 | 4–7 | Hilton Coliseum (7,526); Ames, Iowa |
| January 9, 1982*; 7:35 pm | | Saint Louis | W 74–61 | 5–7 | Hilton Coliseum (3,284); Ames, Iowa |
| January 13, 1982; 7:40 pm, KSHB | | at Kansas State | L 55–75 | 5–8 (0–1) | Ahearn Fieldhouse (11,220); Manhattan, Kansas |
| January 16, 1982; 7:35 pm | | at Oklahoma | L 67–68 | 5–9 (0–2) | Lloyd Noble Center (5,542); Norman, Oklahoma |
| January 20, 1982; 7:35 pm, Cyclone Basketball Network | | Colorado | W 62–58 | 6–9 (1–2) | Hilton Coliseum (7,136); Ames, Iowa |
| January 23, 1982; 2:38 pm, Big Eight | | at Nebraska | L 47–60 | 6–10 (1–3) | Devaney Sports Center (9,223); Lincoln, Nebraska |
| January 27, 1982; 7:35 pm, WOI | | No. 1 Missouri | L 73–86 | 6–11 (1–4) | Hilton Coliseum (11,428); Ames, Iowa |
| January 30, 1982; 7:35 pm | | at Oklahoma State | L 60–69 | 6–12 (1–5) | Gallagher Hall (6,000); Stillwater, Oklahoma |
| February 3, 1982; 7:30 pm, WOI/KSHB/USA | | Kansas | W 55–53 | 7–12 (2–5) | Hilton Coliseum (6,781); Ames, Iowa |
| February 6, 1982; 12:10 pm, Big Eight (NBC) | | Oklahoma | L 69–85 | 7–13 (2–6) | Hilton Coliseum (7,579); Ames, Iowa |
| February 10, 1982; 9:05 pm | | at Colorado | L 64–74 | 7–14 (2–7) | Coors Events Center (4,706); Boulder, Colorado |
| February 13, 1982; 7:35 pm | | Kansas State | L 49–58 | 7–15 (2–8) | Hilton Coliseum (10,134); Ames, Iowa |
| February 16, 1982; 8:08 pm, ESPN | | at No. 4 Missouri | L 71–100 | 7–16 (2–9) | Hearnes Center (10,368); Columbia, Missouri |
| February 20, 1982; 7:35 pm | | Nebraska | W 63–61 | 8–16 (3–9) | Hilton Coliseum (9,202); Ames, Iowa |
| February 24, 1982; 7:35 pm | | Oklahoma State | W 71–64 | 9–16 (4–9) | Hilton Coliseum (7,837); Ames, Iowa |
| February 27, 1982; 1:05 pm | | at Kansas | W 63–61 | 10–16 (5–9) | Allen Fieldhouse (5,600); Lawrence, Kansas |
Big Eight tournament
| March 2, 1982; 7:35 pm | (6) | at (3) Oklahoma; Big Eight tournament Quarterfinals | L 67–71 | 10–17 | Lloyd Noble Center (7,825); Norman, Oklahoma |
*Non-conference game. ^{#}Rankings from AP poll. (#) Tournament seedings in parentheses. All times are in Central Time.
