= 1981–82 Indiana Hoosiers men's basketball team =

American college basketball season

1981–82 Indiana Hoosiers men's basketball

NCAA Men's Division I Tournament, Second Round
- Conference: Big Ten Conference
- Record: 19–10 (12–6 Big Ten)
- Head coach: Bobby Knight (11th season)
- Captains: Ted Kitchel; Landon Turner
- Home arena: Assembly Hall

1981–82 Big Ten Conference men's basketball standings
| | Conf. | | | | Overall |
| Team | W | | L | PCT | W | | L | PCT |
|---|---|---|---|---|---|---|---|---|
| No. 7 Minnesota | 14 | – | 4 | .778 | 23 | – | 6 | .793 |
| No. 16 Iowa | 12 | – | 6 | .667 | 21 | – | 8 | .724 |
| Ohio State | 12 | – | 6 | .667 | 21 | – | 10 | .677 |
| Indiana | 12 | – | 6 | .667 | 19 | – | 10 | .655 |
| Purdue | 11 | – | 7 | .611 | 18 | – | 14 | .563 |
| Illinois | 10 | – | 8 | .556 | 18 | – | 11 | .621 |
| Michigan State | 6 | – | 12 | .333 | 11 | – | 17 | .393 |
| Michigan | 6 | – | 12 | .333 | 7 | – | 20 | .259 |
| Northwestern | 4 | – | 14 | .222 | 8 | – | 19 | .296 |
| Wisconsin* | 1 | – | 17 | .056 | 4 | – | 23 | .148 |
Rankings from AP Poll; *Wisconsin forfeited all games after Jan 25, 1982 due to NCAA sanctions. Disputed record (3–15, 6–23)

The 1981–82 Indiana Hoosiers men's basketball team represented Indiana University. Their head coach was Bobby Knight, who was in his 11th year. The team played its home games in Assembly Hall in Bloomington, Indiana, and was a member of the Big Ten Conference.

The Hoosiers finished the regular season with an overall record of 19–10 and a conference record of 12–6, finishing 2nd in the Big Ten Conference. IU was invited to participate in the 1982 NCAA Tournament as a 5-seed; the Hoosiers advanced to the second round, but they lost to 4-seed UAB.

== Roster ==
| No. | Name | Position | Ht. | Year | Hometown |
|---|---|---|---|---|---|
| 11 | Dan Dakich | G | 6–5 | Fr. | Merrillville, Indiana |
| 20 | Jim Thomas | G | 6–3 | Jr. | Fort Lauderdale, Florida |
| 21 | Winston Morgan | G/F | 6–5 | Fr. | Anderson, Indiana |
| 23 | Chuck Franz | G | 6–2 | Jr. | Clarksville, Indiana |
| 24 | Randy Wittman | G/F | 6–6 | Jr. | Indianapolis, Indiana |
| 25 | Cam Cameron | G | 6–2 | Jr. | Terre Haute, Indiana |
| 30 | Ted Kitchel | F | 6–8 | Jr. | Galveston, Indiana |
| 31 | Tony Brown | G | 6–2 | Jr. | Chicago, Illinois |
| 32 | Landon Turner | F/C | 6–10 | Sr. | Indianapolis, Indiana |
| 33 | Uwe Blab | C | 7–2 | Fr. | Munich, Germany |
| 42 | John Flowers | F | 6–9 | Fr. | Fort Wayne, Indiana |
| 43 | Mike LaFave | F | 6–9 | So. | Indianapolis, Indiana |
| 44 | Rick Rowray | G | 6–6 | Fr. | Muncie, Indiana |
| 54 | Steve Bouchie | F | 6–8 | Jr. | Washington, Indiana |

== Schedule/results ==
| Date time, TV | Rank^{#} | Opponent^{#} | Result | Record | Site city, state |
Regular season
| 11/28/1981* | No. 12 | Miami (OH) | W 71–64 | 1–0 | Assembly Hall; Bloomington, IN |
| 12/1/1981* | No. 12 | Notre Dame | W 69–55 | 2–0 | Assembly Hall; Bloomington, IN |
| 12/8/1981* | No. 10 | at No. 2 Kentucky; Indiana–Kentucky rivalry | L 69–85 | 2–1 | Rupp Arena; Lexington, KY |
| 12/11/1981* | No. 10 | Colorado State; Indiana Classic | W 82–41 | 3–1 | Assembly Hall; Bloomington, IN |
| 12/12/1981* | No. 10 | Penn State; Indiana Classic | W 80–51 | 4–1 | Assembly Hall; Bloomington, IN |
| 12/14/1981* | No. 10 | vs. Tulane | W 77–59 | 5–1 | Market Square Arena; Indianapolis, IN |
| 12/19/1981* | No. 13 | Kansas State | W 58–49 | 6–1 | Assembly Hall; Bloomington, IN |
| 12/28/1981* | No. 11 | vs. No. 20 Villanova; ECAC Holiday Festival | L 59–63 | 6–2 | Madison Square Garden; New York City, NY |
| 12/29/1981* | No. 11 | vs. Kansas | L 61–71 | 6–3 | Madison Square Garden; New York City, NY |
| 1/7/1982 | | at Michigan State | L 58–65 | 6–4 (0–1) | Jenison Fieldhouse; East Lansing, MI |
| 1/9/1982 | | at Northwestern | L 61–75 | 6–5 (0–2) | Welsh-Ryan Arena; Evanston, IL |
| 1/14/1982 | | Michigan | W 81–51 | 7–5 (1–2) | Assembly Hall; Bloomington, IN |
| 1/16/1982 | | Ohio State | W 66–61 | 8–5 (2–2) | Assembly Hall; Bloomington, IN |
| 1/21/1982 | | at Illinois; Rivalry | W 54–53 | 9–5 (3–2) | Assembly Hall; Champaign, IL |
| 1/23/1982 | | Purdue; Rivalry | W 77–55 | 10–5 (4–2) | Assembly Hall; Bloomington, IN |
| 1/28/1982 | | at Wisconsin | W 62–56 | 11–5 (5–2) | Wisconsin Field House; Madison, WI |
| 1/30/1982 | | No. 10 Minnesota | L 62–69 | 11–6 (5–3) | Assembly Hall; Bloomington, IN |
| 2/4/1982 | | at No. 5 Iowa | L 40–62 | 11–7 (5–4) | Iowa Field House; Iowa City, IA |
| 2/6/1982 | | at No. 6 Minnesota | W 58–55 | 12–7 (6–4) | Williams Arena; Minneapolis, MN |
| 2/11/1982 | | Illinois; Rivalry | W 73–60 | 13–7 (7–4) | Assembly Hall; Bloomington, IN |
| 2/13/1982 | | No. 5 Iowa | W 73–58 | 14–7 (8–4) | Assembly Hall; Bloomington, IN |
| 2/18/1982 | No. 20 | Wisconsin | W 88–57 | 15–7 (9–4) | Assembly Hall; Bloomington, IN |
| 2/20/1982 | No. 20 | at Purdue; Rivalry | L 65–76 | 15–8 (9–5) | Mackey Arena; West Lafayette, IN |
| 2/25/1982 | | at Ohio State | L 65–68 | 15–9 (9–6) | St. John Arena; Columbus, OH |
| 2/27/1982 | | at Michigan | W 78–70 | 16–9 (10–6) | Crisler Arena; Ann Arbor, MI |
| 3/4/1982 | | Northwestern | W 79–49 | 17–9 (11–6) | Assembly Hall; Bloomington, IN |
| 3/6/1982 | | Michigan State | W 74–58 | 18–9 (12–6) | Assembly Hall; Bloomington, IN |
NCAA tournament
| 3/11/1982* | (5) | vs. (12) Robert Morris; First Round | W 94–62 | 19–9 (12–6) | Memorial Gymnasium; Nashville, TN |
| 3/13/1982* | (5) | vs. (4) UAB; Second Round | L 70–80 | 19–10 (12–6) | Memorial Gymnasium; Nashville, TN |
*Non-conference game. ^{#}Rankings from AP Poll. (#) Tournament seedings in parentheses.
