= 1981–82 Iowa Hawkeyes men's basketball team =

American college basketball season

1981–82 Iowa Hawkeyes men's basketball

NCAA tournament, Round of 32
- Conference: Big Ten Conference

Ranking
- Coaches: No. 16
- AP: No. 16
- Record: 21–8 (12–6 Big Ten)
- Head coach: Lute Olson (8th season)
- Assistant coaches: Jim Rosborough; Ken Burmeister; Scott Thompson
- MVP: Kevin Boyle
- Home arena: Iowa Field House (Capacity: 13,365)

1981–82 Big Ten Conference men's basketball standings
	Conf.				Overall
Team	W		L	PCT	W		L	PCT
No. 7 Minnesota	14	–	4	.778	23	–	6	.793
No. 16 Iowa	12	–	6	.667	21	–	8	.724
Ohio State	12	–	6	.667	21	–	10	.677
Indiana	12	–	6	.667	19	–	10	.655
Purdue	11	–	7	.611	18	–	14	.563
Illinois	10	–	8	.556	18	–	11	.621
Michigan State	6	–	12	.333	11	–	17	.393
Michigan	6	–	12	.333	7	–	20	.259
Northwestern	4	–	14	.222	8	–	19	.296
Wisconsin*	1	–	17	.056	4	–	23	.148
Rankings from AP Poll; *Wisconsin forfeited all games after Jan 25, 1982 due to NCAA sanctions. Disputed record (3–15, 6–23)

The 1981–82 Iowa Hawkeyes men's basketball team represented the University of Iowa as members of the Big Ten Conference. The team was led by head coach Lute Olson, coaching in his 8th season at the school, and played their home games on campus at the Iowa Field House in Iowa City. They were 20–7 in the regular season and 12–6 in Big Ten play.

In mid-February, Iowa was 18–2 and ranked fifth in the AP poll, but then dropped five of their final seven games. In the last three games of the regular season, all losses, two went to overtime and the third was by a point.

The Hawkeyes received an at-large bid to the NCAA tournament as the sixth-seed in the West Regional. In the opening round at Pullman, Washington, Iowa defeated Northeast Louisiana by seven, but fell 69–67 in overtime to local favorite and #3 seed Idaho in the Round of 32, and finished at 21–8 overall.

== Roster ==
1981–82 Iowa Hawkeyes men's basketball team
Players
Coaches

Pos.	#	Name	Height	Weight	Year	Hometown
G	15	Steve Carfino	6 ft 2 in (1.88 m)	—	So	Los Angeles, California
G	24	Bob Hansen	6 ft 6 in (1.98 m)	—	Jr	Des Moines, Iowa
G	25	Todd Berkenpas	6 ft 2 in (1.88 m)	—	Fr	Mapleton, Iowa
G	30	Kenny Arnold	6 ft 2 in (1.88 m)	—	Sr	Chicago, Illinois
F	32	Jerry Dennard	6 ft 9 in (2.06 m)	—	Jr	Chowchilla, California
F	34	Craig Anderson	6 ft 7 in (2.01 m)	—	So	Madison, Wisconsin
F	40	Kevin Boyle	6 ft 7 in (2.01 m)	—	Sr	Chicago, Illinois
F/C	41	Greg Stokes	6 ft 10 in (2.08 m)	—	Fr	Hamilton, Ohio
C	42	Michael Payne	6 ft 11 in (2.11 m)	—	Fr	Quincy, Illinois
F	44	Mark Gannon	6 ft 7 in (2.01 m)	—	Jr	Iowa City, Iowa
G		Waymond King	6 ft 1 in (1.85 m)	—	So	Kansas City, Missouri

Head coach

- Lute Olson (Augsburg)

Assistant coach(es)

- Jim Rosborough (Iowa)
- Ken Burmeister (St. Mary's (TX))
- Scott Thompson (Iowa)

Legend

- (C) Team captain
- (S) Suspended
- (I) Ineligible
- (W) Walk-on
- Injured
- Current redshirt

== Schedule/results ==
Date time, TV	Rank^{#}	Opponent^{#}	Result	Record	Site city, state
Non-conference regular season
11/28/1981*	No. 9	Northern Illinois	W 84–66	1–0	Iowa Field House; Iowa City, IA
11/30/1981*	No. 9	Nebraska-Omaha	W 71–58	2–0	Iowa Field House; Iowa City, IA
12/5/1981*	No. 6	at Marquette	W 79–68 ^{OT}	3–0	U.S. Cellular Arena (11,052); Milwaukee, WI
12/8/1981*	No. 6	at Iowa State; Rivalry	W 79–68	4–0	Hilton Coliseum; Ames, IA
12/12/1981*	No. 6	Northern Iowa	W 84–53	5–0	Iowa Field House (13,365); Iowa City, IA
12/18/1981*	No. 6	vs. Clemson; Kettle Classic	W 80–68	6–0	Hofheinz Pavilion; Houston, TX
12/19/1981*	No. 6	at Houston; Kettle Classic	L 52–62	6–1	Hofheinz Pavilion; Houston, TX
12/30/1981*	No. 10	Drake; Rivalry	W 60–49	7–1	Iowa Field House; Iowa City, IA
1/2/1982*	No. 10	at South Carolina	W 57–47	8–1	Carolina Coliseum; Columbia, SC
Big Ten Regular Season
1/7/1982	No. 7	Purdue	W 62–40	9–1 (1–0)	Iowa Field House; Iowa City, IA
1/9/1982	No. 7	Illinois	W 56–50	10–1 (2–0)	Iowa Field House (13,365); Iowa City, IA
1/14/1982	No. 5	at No. 11 Minnesota	L 56–61	10–2 (2–1)	Williams Arena; Minneapolis, MN
1/16/1982	No. 5	at Wisconsin	W 78–62	11–2 (3–1)	Wisconsin Field House; Madison, WI
1/21/1982	No. 6	at Northwestern	W 49–48	12–2 (4–1)	Welsh-Ryan Arena; Evanston, IL
1/23/1982	No. 6	Michigan	W 56–38	13–2 (5–1)	Iowa Field House (13,365); Iowa City, IA
1/28/1982	No. 6	at Michigan State	W 57–56	14–2 (6–1)	Jenison Fieldhouse; East Lansing, MI
1/30/1982	No. 6	Ohio State	W 76–66	15–2 (7–1)	Iowa Field House; Iowa City, IA
2/4/1982	No. 5	Indiana	W 62–40	16–2 (8–1)	Iowa Field House; Iowa City, IA
2/6/1982	No. 5	at Ohio State	W 69–65	17–2 (9–1)	St. John Arena; Columbus, OH
2/11/1982	No. 5	Northwestern	W 62–49	18–2 (10–1)	Iowa Field House; Iowa City, IA
2/13/1982	No. 5	at Indiana	L 58–73	18–3 (10–2)	Assembly Hall; Bloomington, IN
2/18/1982	No. 7	Michigan State	W 59–53	19–3 (11–2)	Iowa Field House (13,365); Iowa City, IA
2/20/1982	No. 7	at Michigan	L 58–68	19–4 (11–3)	Crisler Arena (11,052); Ann Arbor, MI
2/25/1982	No. 11	Wisconsin	W 79–55	20–4 (12–3)	Iowa Field House (13,365); Iowa City, IA
2/27/1982	No. 11	No. 13 Minnesota	L 55–57 ^{3OT}	20–5 (12–4)	Iowa Field House (13,365); Iowa City, IA
3/4/1982	No. 11	at Illinois	L 67–73 ^{OT}	20–6 (12–5)	Assembly Hall (16,413); Champaign, IL
3/6/1982	No. 11	at Purdue	L 65–66	20–7 (12–6)	Mackey Arena; West Lafayette, IN
NCAA Tournament
3/12/1982*	(6W) No. 16	vs. (11W) Northeast Louisiana; First Round	W 70–63	21–7	Beasley Coliseum (9,420); Pullman, WA
3/14/1982*	(6W) No. 16	vs. (3W) No. 8 Idaho; Second Round	L 67–69 ^{OT}	21–8	Beasley Coliseum (12,340); Pullman, WA
*Non-conference game. ^{#}Rankings from AP Poll. (#) Tournament seedings in parentheses.
