= Tony Guy =

American basketball player

Personal information
- Born: July 4, 1959 (age 67) Towson, Maryland, U.S.
- Listed height: 6 ft 6 in (1.98 m)
- Listed weight: 203 lb (92 kg)

Career information
- High school: Loyola Blakefield (Towson, Maryland)
- College: Kansas (1978–1982)
- NBA draft: 1982: 2nd round, 46th overall pick
- Drafted by: Boston Celtics
- Playing career: 1982–1984
- Position: Shooting guard
- Number: 31

Career history
- 1982: Maine Lumberjacks
- 1982–1983: Wyoming Wildcatters

Career highlights
- CBA All-Defensive First Team (1983); McDonald's All-American (1978); Second-team Parade All-American (1978)
- Stats at Basketball Reference

Anthony Robert Guy (born July 4, 1959) is an American former professional basketball player. He was a McDonald's All-American while playing at Loyola High School in Towson, Maryland. Guy played collegiately for the Kansas Jayhawks, where he served as team captain during his final two seasons. He was selected by the Boston Celtics as the 46th overall pick in the 1982 NBA draft but was told by Celtics general manager Red Auerbach that he would not make the team and should instead hone his skills in the Continental Basketball Association (CBA) that season. Guy split the 1982–83 season in the CBA with the Wyoming Wildcatters and the Maine Lumberjacks and was selected to the CBA All-Defensive First Team. He received an unsuccessful tryout with the New York Knicks in 1983. He played in Switzerland for one season and then returned to tryout for the Cleveland Cavaliers. A hamstring injury suffered two weeks before the start of the 1984–85 NBA season derailed his chances of making the team and he retired from playing basketball.

Guy enrolled in the University of Missouri–Kansas City graduate business school. After graduating, he received a position with State Farm in the Kansas City Area, where he has worked for 30 years.

== Career statistics ==
Legend
GP	Games played	GS	Games started	MPG	Minutes per game
FG%	Field goal percentage	3P%	3-point field goal percentage	FT%	Free throw percentage
RPG	Rebounds per game	APG	Assists per game	SPG	Steals per game
BPG	Blocks per game	PPG	Points per game	**Bold**	Career high

=== College ===
Year	Team	GP	GS	MPG	FG%	3P%	FT%	RPG	APG	SPG	BPG	PPG
1978–79	Kansas	29	29	29.4	.461	–	.711	**3.6**	2.2	1.3	**.1**	9.2
1979–80	Kansas	29	17	30.6	.481	–	**.785**	**3.6**	2.5	1.1	**.1**	10.9
1980–81	Kansas	**32**	**32**	36.2	**.537**	–	.776	3.5	2.8	**1.9**	**.1**	**15.8**
1981–82	Kansas	27	27	**37.5**	.433	–	.681	3.5	**3.8**	1.1	**.1**	14.9
Career		117	105	33.4	.480	–	.740	3.5	2.8	1.4	.1	12.7
