= 1981–82 Kansas State Wildcats men's basketball team =

American college basketball season

1981–82 Kansas State Wildcats men's basketball

NCAA tournament, Sweet Sixteen
- Conference: Big Eight Conference

Ranking
- Coaches: No. 18
- Record: 23–8 (10–4 Big Eight)
- Head coach: Jack Hartman (12th season)
- Assistant coach: Lon Kruger (3rd season)
- Home arena: Ahearn Field House

1981–82 Big Eight Conference men's basketball standings
	Conf.				Overall
Team	W		L	PCT	W		L	PCT
No. 5 Missouri †	12	–	2	.857	27	–	4	.871
Kansas State	10	–	4	.714	23	–	8	.742
Oklahoma	8	–	6	.571	22	–	11	.667
Nebraska	7	–	7	.500	16	–	12	.571
Oklahoma State	7	–	7	.500	15	–	12	.556
Iowa State	5	–	9	.357	10	–	17	.370
Kansas	4	–	10	.286	13	–	14	.481
Colorado	3	–	11	.214	11	–	16	.407
† 1982 Big Eight tournament winner Rankings from AP Poll

The 1981–82 Kansas State Wildcats men's basketball team represented Kansas State University in the 1981-82 NCAA Division I men's basketball season.

== Roster ==
1981–82 Kansas State Wildcats men's basketball team
Players
Coaches

Pos.	#	Name	Height	Weight	Year	Hometown
G	12	Tim Jankovich	6 ft 0 in (1.83 m)	165 lb (75 kg)	Sr	Manhattan, Kansas
F	45	Ed Nealy	6 ft 7 in (2.01 m)	238 lb (108 kg)	Sr	Bonner Springs, Kansas
F	52	Randy Reed	6 ft 7 in (2.01 m)	215 lb (98 kg)	Sr	St. Louis, Missouri

Head coach

- Jack Hartman

Assistant coach(es)

Legend

- (C) Team captain
- (S) Suspended
- (I) Ineligible
- (W) Walk-on
- Injured
- Current redshirt

Roster

== Schedule ==
Date time, TV	Rank^{#}	Opponent^{#}	Result	Record	Site city, state
Regular Season
November 28*		Northern Iowa	W 86–50	1–0	Ahearn Field House; Manhattan, Kansas
November 30*		Stewart B.C.	W 91–44	2–0	Ahearn Field House; Manhattan, Kansas
December 3*		Auburn-Montgomery	W 83–46	3–0	Ahearn Field House; Manhattan, Kansas
December 5*		at Illinois	L 49–55	3–1	Assembly Hall; Champaign, Illinois
December 9*		Arizona	W 63–55	4–1	Ahearn Field House; Manhattan, Kansas
December 12*		Wisconsin-Parkside	W 83–63	5–1	Ahearn Field House; Manhattan, Kansas
December 19*		at Indiana	L 49–58	5–2	Assembly Hall; Bloomington, Indiana
December 21*		No. 8 Minnesota	W 62–52	6–2	Ahearn Field House; Manhattan, Kansas
December 30*		Southern Illinois	W 82–53	7–2	Ahearn Field House; Manhattan, Kansas
January 4*		UNLV	W 82–65	8–2	Ahearn Field House; Manhattan, Kansas
January 6*		Marquette	W 70–65	9–2	Ahearn Field House (11,010); Manhattan, Kansas
January 9*		Western Illinois	W 67–57	10–2	Ahearn Field House; Manhattan, Kansas
January 13; 7:40 pm, KSHB		Iowa State	W 75–55	11–2 (1—0)	Ahearn Field House (11,220); Manhattan, Kansas
January 16		at Colorado	W 78–68	12–2 (2—0)	CU Events/Conference Center; Boulder, Colorado
January 20		Oklahoma	W 47–42	13–2 (3—0)	Ahearn Field House; Manhattan, Kansas
January 23	No. 18	Kansas; Sunflower Showdown	W 70–53	14–2 (4—0)	Ahearn Field House; Manhattan, Kansas
January 27		at Oklahoma State	L 53–56	14–3 (4—1)	Gallagher-Iba Arena; Stillwater, Oklahoma
January 30	No. 14	No. 1 Missouri	L 58–59	14–4 (4—2)	Ahearn Field House; Manhattan, Kansas
February 3		at Nebraska	W 75–64	15–4 (5—2)	Bob Devaney Sports Center; Lincoln, Nebraska
February 6		Colorado	W 65–58	16–4 (6—2)	Ahearn Field House; Manhattan, Kansas
February 10		at Oklahoma	L 58–68	16–5 (6—3)	Lloyd Noble Center; Norman, Oklahoma
February 13; 7:35 pm		at Iowa State	W 58–49	17–5 (7—3)	Hilton Coliseum (10,134); Ames, Iowa
February 17		Oklahoma State	L 62–72	17–6 (7—4)	Ahearn Field House; Manhattan, Kansas
February 20	No. 18	at Kansas; Sunflower Showdown	W 63–53	18–6 (8—4)	Allen Fieldhouse; Lawrence, Kansas
February 24		at No. 5 Missouri	W 57–56	19–6 (9—4)	Hearnes Center; Columbia, Missouri
February 27		Nebraska	W 67–50	20–6 (10—4)	Ahearn Field House; Manhattan, Kansas
Big 8 Tournament
March 2	(2) No. 17	(7) Kansas; Quarterfinals	W 74–62	21–6 (10—4)	Ahearn Field House; Manhattan, Kansas
March 5	(2) No. 17	vs. (3) Oklahoma; Semifinals	L 62–68	21–7 (10—4)	Kemper Arena; Kansas City, Missouri
NCAA Tournament
March 12	(5 MW)	vs. Northern Illinois; First Round	W 77–68	22–7 (10—4)	Reunion Arena; Dallas, Texas
March 14*	(5 MW)	vs. (4 MW) No. 12 Arkansas; Second Round	W 65–64	23–7 (10—4)	Reunion Arena; Dallas, Texas
March 19*	(5 MW)	vs. (8 MW) Boston College; Sweet Sixteen	L 65–69	23–8 (10—4)	St. Louis Arena; St. Louis, Missouri
*Non-conference game. ^{#}Rankings from AP Poll. (#) Tournament seedings in parentheses. MW=Midwest. All times are in Central Time.
