= 1981–82 Ohio State Buckeyes men's basketball team =

American college basketball season

1981–82 Ohio State Buckeyes men's basketball

NCAA tournament
- Conference: Big Ten Conference
- Record: 21–10 (12–6 Big Ten)
- Head coach: Eldon Miller (6th season)
- Home arena: St. John Arena

1981–82 Big Ten Conference men's basketball standings
	Conf.				Overall
Team	W		L	PCT	W		L	PCT
No. 7 Minnesota	14	–	4	.778	23	–	6	.793
No. 16 Iowa	12	–	6	.667	21	–	8	.724
Ohio State	12	–	6	.667	21	–	10	.677
Indiana	12	–	6	.667	19	–	10	.655
Purdue	11	–	7	.611	18	–	14	.563
Illinois	10	–	8	.556	18	–	11	.621
Michigan State	6	–	12	.333	11	–	17	.393
Michigan	6	–	12	.333	7	–	20	.259
Northwestern	4	–	14	.222	8	–	19	.296
Wisconsin*	1	–	17	.056	4	–	23	.148
Rankings from AP Poll; *Wisconsin forfeited all games after Jan 25, 1982 due to NCAA sanctions. Disputed record (3–15, 6–23)

The 1981–82 Ohio State Buckeyes men's basketball team represented Ohio State University during the 1981–82 NCAA Division I men's basketball season. Led by 6th-year head coach Eldon Miller, the Buckeyes finished 21–10 (12–6 Big Ten) and reached the NCAA tournament.

== Roster ==
1981–82 Ohio State Buckeyes men's basketball team
Players
Coaches

Pos.	#	Name	Height	Weight	Year	Hometown
F		Tony Campbell	6 ft 7 in (2.01 m)	210 lb (95 kg)	So	Teaneck, New Jersey
C	13	Granville Waiters	6 ft 11 in (2.11 m)	220 lb (100 kg)	Jr	Columbus, Ohio
F	33	Clark Kellogg	6 ft 7 in (2.01 m)	220 lb (100 kg)	Jr	Cleveland, Ohio
F		Bryant Johnson	6 ft 7 in (2.01 m)	—	Sr	Washington, D.C.

Head coach

- Eldon Miller (Wittenberg)

Assistant coach(es)

Legend

- (C) Team captain
- (S) Suspended
- (I) Ineligible
- (W) Walk-on
- Injured
- Current redshirt

== Schedule/results ==
Date time, TV	Rank^{#}	Opponent^{#}	Result	Record	Site (attendance) city, state
Non-conference regular season
Nov 25, 1981*		vs. Iona; Great Alaska Shootout	L 57–58	0–1	Buckner Fieldhouse (3,600); Fort Richardson, Alaska
Nov 26, 1981*		vs. McNeese State; Great Alaska Shootout	W 63–60	1–1	Buckner Fieldhouse; Fort Richardson, Alaska
Nov 27, 1981*		vs. No. 5 Georgetown; Great Alaska Shootout	W 47–46	2–1	Buckner Fieldhouse (1,600); Fort Richardson, Alaska
Dec 2, 1981*		Kent State	W 74–54	3–1	St. John Arena; Columbus, Ohio
Dec 5, 1981*		No. 2 Kentucky	L 62–78	3–2	St. John Arena; Columbus, Ohio
Dec 12, 1981*		at West Virginia	L 68–73	3–3	WVU Coliseum; Morgantown, West Virginia
Dec 15, 1981*		at South Alabama	W 68–58	4–3	Jaguar Gym; Mobile, Alabama
Dec 19, 1981*		vs. Princeton	W 59–55	5–3	
Dec 22, 1981*		Florida	W 61–58	6–3	St. John Arena; Columbus, Ohio
Dec 29, 1981*		Washington State	W 63–54	7–3	St. John Arena; Columbus, Ohio
Jan 2, 1982*		Butler	W 66–48	8–3	St. John Arena; Columbus, Ohio
Jan 4, 1982*		Syracuse	W 67–57	9–3	St. John Arena; Columbus, Ohio
Big Ten Regular season
Jan 7, 1982		No. 6 Minnesota	W 49–47	10–3 (1–0)	St. John Arena; Columbus, Ohio
Jan 9, 1982		Wisconsin	W 66–59	11–3 (2–0)	St. John Arena; Columbus, Ohio
Jan 14, 1982		at Illinois	W 51–50	12–3 (3–0)	Assembly Hall; Champaign, Illinois
Jan 16, 1982		at Indiana	L 61–66	12–4 (3–1)	Assembly Hall; Bloomington, Indiana
Jan 21, 1982		Purdue	L 60–66	12–5 (3–2)	St. John Arena; Columbus, Ohio
Jan 23, 1982		Northwestern	W 59–57	13–5 (4–2)	St. John Arena; Columbus, Ohio
Jan 28, 1982		at Michigan	L 60–62	13–6 (4–3)	Crisler Arena; Ann Arbor, Michigan
Jan 30, 1982		at No. 6 Iowa	L 66–76	13–7 (4–4)	Iowa Field House; Iowa City, Iowa
Feb 4, 1982		Michigan State	W 50–49	14–7 (5–4)	St. John Arena; Columbus, Ohio
Feb 6, 1982		No. 5 Iowa	L 65–69	14–8 (5–5)	St. John Arena; Columbus, Ohio
Feb 11, 1982		at Purdue	W 74–68	15–8 (6–5)	Mackey Arena; West Lafayette, Indiana
Feb 13, 1982		at Michigan State	W 51–46	16–8 (7–5)	Jenison Fieldhouse; East Lansing, Michigan
Feb 18, 1982		Michigan	W 64–63	17–8 (8–5)	St. John Arena; Columbus, Ohio
Feb 20, 1982		at Northwestern	W 67–62	18–8 (9–5)	Welsh-Ryan Arena; Evanston, Illinois
Feb 25, 1982		Indiana	W 68–65	19–8 (10–5)	St. John Arena; Columbus, Ohio
Feb 27, 1982		Illinois	W 63–53	20–8 (11–5)	St. John Arena; Columbus, Ohio
Mar 4, 1982		at Wisconsin	W 77–75	21–8 (12–5)	Wisconsin Field House; Madison, Wisconsin
Mar 6, 1982		at No. 7 Minnesota	L 75–87	21–9 (12–6)	Williams Arena; Minneapolis, Minnesota
NCAA tournament
Mar 11, 1982*	(8 E)	vs. (9 E) James Madison; First round	L 48–55	21–10	Charlotte Coliseum (11,200); Charlotte, North Carolina
*Non-conference game. ^{#}Rankings from AP Poll. (#) Tournament seedings in parentheses. E=East.
