= 1981–82 Wisconsin Badgers men's basketball team =

American college basketball season

1981–82 Wisconsin Badgers men's basketball
- Conference: Big Ten Conference
- Record: 6–21 (3–15 Big Ten)
- Head coach: Bill Cofield (6th season)
- Home arena: UW Fieldhouse

1981–82 Big Ten Conference men's basketball standings
	Conf.				Overall
Team	W		L	PCT	W		L	PCT
No. 7 Minnesota	14	–	4	.778	23	–	6	.793
No. 16 Iowa	12	–	6	.667	21	–	8	.724
Ohio State	12	–	6	.667	21	–	10	.677
Indiana	12	–	6	.667	19	–	10	.655
Purdue	11	–	7	.611	18	–	14	.563
Illinois	10	–	8	.556	18	–	11	.621
Michigan State	6	–	12	.333	11	–	17	.393
Michigan	6	–	12	.333	7	–	20	.259
Northwestern	4	–	14	.222	8	–	19	.296
Wisconsin*	1	–	17	.056	4	–	23	.148
Rankings from AP Poll; *Wisconsin forfeited all games after Jan 25, 1982 due to NCAA sanctions. Disputed record (3–15, 6–23)

The 1981–82 Wisconsin Badgers men's basketball team represented University of Wisconsin–Madison. The head coach was Bill Cofield, coaching his sixth and final season with the Badgers. The team played their home games at the UW Fieldhouse in Madison, Wisconsin and was a member of the Big Ten Conference.

== Roster ==
1981–82 Wisconsin Badgers men's basketball team
Players
Coaches

Pos.	#	Name	Height	Weight	Year	Hometown
G	10	Greg Dandridge	6 ft 2 in (1.88 m)	175 lb (79 kg)	Jr	Milwaukee, Wisconsin
F	12	John Bailey	6 ft 3 in (1.91 m)	175 lb (79 kg)	Sr	Macon, Georgia
G	14	Steve Jacobson	6 ft 1 in (1.85 m)	180 lb (82 kg)	Sr	Pardeeville, Wisconsin
F	30	Cory Blackwell	6 ft 6 in (1.98 m)	215 lb (98 kg)	Fr	Chicago, Illinois
F	31	Scott Roth	6 ft 7 in (2.01 m)	200 lb (91 kg)	Fr	Brecksville, Ohio
F	32	Brad Sellers	6 ft 11 in (2.11 m)	210 lb (95 kg)	Fr	Warrensville Heights, Ohio
F/C	41	Keith Mitchell	6 ft 9 in (2.06 m)	210 lb (95 kg)	Sr	Taylor, Michigan
F	44	Gary Zinkgraf	6 ft 7 in (2.01 m)	205 lb (93 kg)	Sr	Bethesda, Maryland
C	45	John Ploss	6 ft 9 in (2.06 m)	220 lb (100 kg)	Fr	Antioch, Illinois
F	51	Jack Hippen	6 ft 7 in (2.01 m)	205 lb (93 kg)	Fr	Chadwick, Illinois
G		Carl Golston	5 ft 9 in (1.75 m)	—	Fr

Head coach

- Bill Cofield (McKendree)

Assistant coach(es)

- Bo Ryan (Wilkes)

Legend

- (C) Team captain
- (S) Suspended
- (I) Ineligible
- (W) Walk-on
- Injured
- Current redshirt

== Schedule ==
Date time, TV	Rank^{#}	Opponent^{#}	Result	Record	Site city, state
Regular Season
12/4/1981*		UIC; Wisconsin Invitational	L 66–74	0–1	UW Fieldhouse; Madison, WI
12/5/1981*		UW—Green Bay; Wisconsin Invitational	W 77–65	1–1	UW Fieldhouse; Madison, WI
12/9/1981*		at Central Michigan	L 68–71	1–2	Rose Arena; Mount Pleasant, MI
12/12/1981*		Ball State	W 71–70	2–2	UW Fieldhouse; Madison, WI
12/21/1981*		Northern Iowa	W 65–53	3–2	UW Fieldhouse; Madison, WI
12/27/1981*		vs. Oregon; Far West Classic	L 82–85	3–3	Memorial Coliseum; Portland, OR
12/28/1981*		vs. Tennessee; Far West Classic	L 67–79	3–4	Memorial Coliseum; Portland, OR
12/29/1981*; 3:00 p.m.		vs. Iowa State; Far West Classic Consolation seventh place	L 79–103	3–5	Memorial Coliseum; Portland, OR
1/7/1982		at Michigan	W 65–63	4–5 (1–0)	Crisler Arena; Ann Arbor, MI
1/9/1982		at Ohio State	L 59–67	4–6 (1–1)	St. John Arena; Columbus, OH
1/14/1982		Northwestern	L 55–61	4–7 (1–2)	UW Fieldhouse; Madison, WI
1/16/1982		No. 5 Iowa	L 62–78	4–8 (1–3)	UW Fieldhouse; Madison, WI
1/21/1982		No. 5 Minnesota	L 57–78	4–9 (1–4)	UW Fieldhouse; Madison, WI
1/23/1982		at Michigan State	L 58–68	4–10 (1–5)	Jenison Fieldhouse; Lansing. MI
1/28/1982		Indiana	L 56–62	4–11 (1–6)	UW Fieldhouse; Madison, WI
1/30/1982		at Purdue	L 67–81	4–12 (1–7)	Mackey Arena; West Lafayette, IN
2/4/1982		at Illinois	L 54–88	4–13 (1–8)	Assembly Hall; Champaign, IL
2/6/1982		Purdue	L 46–55	4–14 (1–9)	UW Fieldhouse; Madison, WI
2/11/1982		at No. 9 Minnesota	L 60–71	4–15 (1–10)	Williams Arena; Minneapolis, MN
2/13/1982		Illinois	L 60–68	4–16 (1–11)	UW Fieldhouse; Madison, WI
2/18/1982		at No. 20 Indiana	L 57–88	4–17 (1–12)	Assembly Hall; Bloomington, IN
2/20/1982		Michigan State	W 65–60	5–17 (2–12)	UW Fieldhouse; Madison, WI
2/25/1982		at No. 11 Iowa	L 55–79	5–18 (2–13)	Carver–Hawkeye Arena; Iowa City, IA
2/27/1982		at Northwestern	W 61–60	6–18 (3–13)	McGaw Memorial Hall; Evanston, IL
3/4/1982		Ohio State	L 75–77	6–19 (3–14)	UW Fieldhouse; Madison, WI
3/6/1982		Michigan	L 84–91	6–20 (3–15)	UW Fieldhouse; Madison, WI
3/9/1982*		at Marquette	L 64–94	6–21	MECCA Arena; Milwaukee, WI
*Non-conference game. ^{#}Rankings from AP Poll. (#) Tournament seedings in parentheses. All times are in Central Time.
