= 1981–82 Michigan State Spartans men's basketball team =

American college basketball season

1981–82 Michigan State Spartans men's basketball
- Conference: Big Ten Conference
- Record: 12–16 (7–11 Big Ten)
- Head coach: Jud Heathcote (6th season)
- Assistant coaches: Frank Rourke; John Holms; William Norton
- Captains: Kurt James; Kevin Smith
- Home arena: Jenison Fieldhouse

1981–82 Big Ten Conference men's basketball standings
	Conf.				Overall
Team	W		L	PCT	W		L	PCT
No. 7 Minnesota	14	–	4	.778	23	–	6	.793
No. 16 Iowa	12	–	6	.667	21	–	8	.724
Ohio State	12	–	6	.667	21	–	10	.677
Indiana	12	–	6	.667	19	–	10	.655
Purdue	11	–	7	.611	18	–	14	.563
Illinois	10	–	8	.556	18	–	11	.621
Michigan State	6	–	12	.333	11	–	17	.393
Michigan	6	–	12	.333	7	–	20	.259
Northwestern	4	–	14	.222	8	–	19	.296
Wisconsin*	1	–	17	.056	4	–	23	.148
Rankings from AP Poll; *Wisconsin forfeited all games after Jan 25, 1982 due to NCAA sanctions. Disputed record (3–15, 6–23)

The 1981–82 Michigan State Spartans men's basketball team represented Michigan State University in the 1981–82 NCAA Division I men's basketball season. The team played their home games at Jenison Field House in East Lansing, Michigan and were members of the Big Ten Conference. They were coached by Jud Heathcote in his sixth year at Michigan State. The Spartans finished with a record of 11–17, 6–12 to finish in a tie for seventh place in Big Ten play.

Due to NCAA sanctions against Wisconsin for providing improper benefits for players, MSU's official record for the year is 12–16, 7–11.

== Previous season ==
The Spartans finished the 1980–81 season 13–14, 7–11 in Big Ten play to finish in eighth place in conference.

== Roster and statistics ==
1981–82 Michigan State Spartans men's basketball team
No	Name	Pos	Year	Height	Pts	Reb	Ast
5	Kevin Smith	G	SR	6–2	15.6	2.1	4.5
10	Tim Gore	G	SO	6–4	0.4	0.0	0.0
11	Sam Vincent	G	FR	6–2	11.7	2.8	3.1
20	Ben Tower	F	SO	6–8	5.4	4.6	0.8
22	Bill Cawood	F	JR	6–7	0.5	0.4	0.2
23	Randy Morrison	G	SO	6–2	5.0	1.5	1.6
24	Richard Mudd	F	SO	6–9	3.3	1.9	0.2
30	Kurt James	F	SR	6–7	1.5	3.2	0.3
35	Larry Polec	F	FR	6–8			
41	Derek Perry	F	JR	6–6	8.6	5.4	1.4
42	Kevin Willis	C	SO	7–0	6.0	4.2	0.1
43	Evaristo Perez	F			2.0	1.6	0.2
44	Herb Bostic	G	JR	6–4	1.0	0.7	0.1
50	Cleveland Bibbens	F	SO	6–6	2.8	1.9	0.3
52	Steve Bates	C	SR	6–10	0.5	0.8	0.0

== Schedule and results ==
Date time, TV	Rank^{#}	Opponent^{#}	Result	Record	Site city, state
Non-conference regular season
Nov 27, 1981*		Central Michigan; Spartan Cutlass Classic semifinals	W 89–70	1–0	Jenison Field House; East Lansing, MI
Nov 28, 1981*		Western Michigan; Spartan Cutlass Classic finals	L 79–83	1–1	Jenison Field House; East Lansing, MI
Dec 2, 1981*		at Detroit Mercy	W 65–62	2–1	Calihan Hall; Detroit, MI
Dec 5, 1981*		at Kansas	L 56–74	2–2	Allen Fieldhouse; Lawrence, KS
Dec 12, 1981*		Cincinnati	L 45–56	2–3	Jenison Field House; East Lansing, MI
Dec 15, 1981*		Green Bay	W 49–48	3–3	Jenison Field House; East Lansing, MI
Dec 19, 1981*		Marshall	W 101–82	4–3	Jenison Field House; East Lansing, MI
Dec 27, 1981*		vs. No. 20 North Carolina State; Rainbow Classic quarterfinals	L 46–67	4–4	Neil S. Blaisdell Center; Honolulu, HI
Dec 28, 2016*		vs. Cal State Fullerton; Rainbow Classic consolation	W 51–50	5–4	Neil S. Blaisdell Center; Honolulu, HI
Dec 29, 1981*		at Hawaii	L 61–62	5–5	Neil S. Blaisdell Center; Rainbow Classic fifth place game
Big Ten regular season
Jan 7, 1982		Indiana	W 65–58	6–5 (1–0)	Jenison Field House; East Lansing, MI
Jan 9, 1982		No. 6 Minnesota	L 58–64	6–6 (1–1)	Jenison Field House; East Lansing, MI
Jan 14, 1982		at Purdue	L 47–53	6–7 (1–2)	Mackey Arena; West Lafayette, IN
Jan 16, 1982		at Illinois	L 51–55	6–8 (1–3)	Assembly Hall; Champaign, IL
Jan 21, 1982		at Michigan; Rivalry	W 64–62	7–8 (2–3)	Crisler Arena; Ann Arbor, MI
Jan 23, 1982		Wisconsin	W 68–58	8–8 (3–3)	Jenison Field House; East Lansing, MI
Jan 28, 1982		No. 6 Iowa	L 56–57	8–9 (3–4)	Jenison Field House; East Lansing, MI
Jan 30, 1982		Northwestern	W 64–61	9–9 (4–4)	Jenison Field House; East Lansing, MI
Feb 4, 1982		at Ohio State	L 49–50	9–10 (4–5)	St. John Arena; Columbus, OH
Feb 6, 1982		at Northwestern	L 43–48	9–11 (4–6)	Welsh-Ryan Arena; Evanston, IL
Feb 11, 1982		Michigan; Rivalry	W 66–55	10–11 (5–6)	Jenison Field House; East Lansing, MI
Feb 13, 1982		Ohio State	L 46–51	10–12 (5–7)	Jenison Field House; East Lansing, MI
Feb 18, 1982		at No. 7 Iowa	L 53–59	10–13 (5–8)	Iowa Fieldhouse; Iowa City, IA
Feb 20, 1982		at Wisconsin	L 60–65	10–14 (5–9)	Wisconsin Field House; Madison, WI
Feb 25, 1982		Illinois	W 56–47	11–14 (6–9)	Jenison Field House; East Lansing, MI
Feb 27, 1982		Purdue	L 49–51	11–15 (6–10)	Jenison Field House; East Lansing, MI
Mar 4, 1982		at No. 7 Minnesota	L 51–54	11–16 (6–11)	Williams Arena; Minneapolis, MN
Mar 6, 1982		Indiana	L 58–74	11–17 (6–12)	Assembly Hall; Bloomington, IN
*Non-conference game. ^{#}Rankings from AP Poll,. (#) Tournament seedings in parentheses. All times are in Central Time Source.

== Awards and honors ==
- Kevin Smith – All-Big Ten First Team
