= 1982 Missouri Valley Conference men's basketball tournament =

- Classification: Division I
- Season: 1981–82
- Teams: 8
- Site: Campus sites
- Finals site: Tulsa Convention Center; Tulsa, Oklahoma
- Champions: Tulsa (1st title)
- Winning coach: Nolan Richardson (1st title)

1981–82 Missouri Valley Conference men's basketball standings
	Conf.				Overall
Team	W		L	PCT	W		L	PCT
Bradley	13	–	3	.813	26	–	10	.722
No. 10 Tulsa †	12	–	4	.750	24	–	6	.800
Wichita State	12	–	4	.750	23	–	6	.793
New Mexico State	10	–	6	.625	17	–	11	.607
Illinois State	9	–	7	.563	17	–	12	.586
Drake	7	–	9	.438	12	–	15	.444
Southern Illinois	7	–	9	.438	11	–	16	.407
Creighton	4	–	12	.250	7	–	20	.259
Indiana State	3	–	13	.188	9	–	18	.333
West Texas State	3	–	13	.188	11	–	15	.423
† 1982 MVC tournament winner Rankings from AP Poll

The 1982 Missouri Valley Conference men's basketball tournament was played after the conclusion of the 1981–1982 regular season. The quarterfinal and semifinal rounds were played on campus sites with the final contested at the Tulsa Convention Center in Tulsa, Oklahoma.

The tenth ranked Tulsa Golden Hurricane defeated the Illinois State Redbirds in the championship game, 90–77, and as a result won their first MVC Tournament title to earn an automatic bid to the 1982 NCAA tournament.

== Bracket ==
Quarterfinals; March 5, 1982; Campus Sites, Higher Seed
1	Bradley	86
8	Indiana State	61
4	Illinois State	56
5	Drake	43
2	No. 10 Tulsa	106
7	Creighton	81
3	New Mexico State	68
6	Southern Illinois	43

Semifinals; March 6, 1982; Campus Sites, Higher Seed
1	Bradley	50 ^{2OT}
4	Illinois State	55
2	No. 10 Tulsa	85
3	New Mexico State	61

Final; March 7, 1982; Tulsa Convention Center
4	Illinois State	77
2	No. 10 Tulsa	90
