= 1981–82 Tulsa Golden Hurricane men's basketball team =

American college basketball season

1981–82 Tulsa Golden Hurricane men's basketball

MVC tournament champion

NCAA tournament, Second round
- Conference: Missouri Valley Conference

Ranking
- Coaches: No. 11
- AP: No. 10
- Record: 24–6 (12–4 MVC)
- Head coach: Nolan Richardson (2nd season)
- Assistant coaches: Scott Edgar (2nd season); Andy Stoglin
- Home arena: Tulsa Convention Center

1981–82 Missouri Valley Conference men's basketball standings
	Conf.				Overall
Team	W		L	PCT	W		L	PCT
Bradley	13	–	3	.813	26	–	10	.722
No. 10 Tulsa †	12	–	4	.750	24	–	6	.800
Wichita State	12	–	4	.750	23	–	6	.793
New Mexico State	10	–	6	.625	17	–	11	.607
Illinois State	9	–	7	.563	17	–	12	.586
Drake	7	–	9	.438	12	–	15	.444
Southern Illinois	7	–	9	.438	11	–	16	.407
Creighton	4	–	12	.250	7	–	20	.259
Indiana State	3	–	13	.188	9	–	18	.333
West Texas State	3	–	13	.188	11	–	15	.423
† 1982 MVC tournament winner Rankings from AP Poll

The 1981–82 Tulsa Golden Hurricane men's basketball team represented the University of Tulsa as a member of the Missouri Valley Conference during the 1981–82 college basketball season. The Golden Hurricane played their home games at the Tulsa Convention Center. Led by head coach Nolan Richardson, they finished the season 24–6 overall and 12–4 in conference play to finish second in the MVC standings. The Golden Hurricane won the MVC tournament to receive an automatic bid to the NCAA tournament as the No. 3 seed in the Midwest region. Tulsa lost to No. 6 seed and eventual Final Four participant Houston in the round of 32.

== Roster ==
1981–82 Tulsa Golden Hurricane men's basketball team
Players
Coaches

Pos.	#	Name	Height	Weight	Year	Hometown
G	12	Mike Anderson	—	—	Sr	Birmingham, Alabama
G	20	Steve Harris	6 ft 5 in (1.96 m)	190 lb (86 kg)	Fr	Kansas City, Missouri
G	24	Ricky Ross	6 ft 7 in (2.01 m)	—	So
G	25	Paul Pressey	6 ft 5 in (1.96 m)	180 lb (82 kg)	Sr	Richmond, Virginia

Head coach

Nolan Richardson

Assistant coach(es)

Legend

- (C) Team captain
- (S) Suspended
- (I) Ineligible
- (W) Walk-on
- Injured
- Current redshirt

== Schedule and results ==
Date time, TV	Rank^{#}	Opponent^{#}	Result	Record	Site (attendance) city, state
Regular season
Nov 28, 1981*	No. 11	U.S. International	W 89–62	1–0	Tulsa Convention Center (8,473); Tulsa, Oklahoma
Dec 3, 1981*; ESPN	No. 9	at No. 1 North Carolina	L 70–78	1–1	Carmichael Auditorium (10,000); Chapel Hill, North Carolina
Dec 5, 1981*	No. 11	St. Mary's (TX)	W 57–43	2–1	Tulsa Convention Center (8,288); Tulsa, Oklahoma
Dec 8, 1981*; KTUL-TV	No. 14	at Oklahoma State	W 93–82	3–1	Gallagher-Iba Arena (7,000); Stillwater, Oklahoma
Dec 11, 1981*; Cable	No. 14	Texas Christian	W 72–62	4–1	Tulsa Convention Center (8,074); Tulsa, Oklahoma
Dec 12, 1981*; Cable	No. 14	Oral Roberts	W 80–63	5–1	Tulsa Convention Center (8,249); Tulsa, Oklahoma
Dec 19, 1981*	No. 12	Central Florida	W 69–58	6–1	Tulsa Convention Center (7,905); Tulsa, Oklahoma
Dec 22, 1981*	No. 14	Florida Southern	W 94–68	7–1	Tulsa Convention Center (7,851); Tulsa, Oklahoma
Jan 2, 1982*; Cable	No. 13	Oklahoma	W 98–96	8–1	Tulsa Convention Center (8,804); Tulsa, Oklahoma
Jan 4, 1982	No. 13	Creighton	W 80–55	9–1 (1–0)	Tulsa Convention Center (8,871); Tulsa, Oklahoma
Jan 9, 1982; MVC-TV	No. 10	at New Mexico State	L 66–74	9–2 (1–1)	Pan American Center (10,848); Las Cruces, New Mexico
Jan 11, 1982; Cable	No. 10	at West Texas State	W 98–84	10–2 (2–1)	WT Fieldhouse (4,029); Canyon, Texas
Jan 14, 1982; Cable	No. 18	Drake	W 71–54	11–2 (3–1)	Tulsa Convention Center (8,764); Tulsa, Oklahoma
Jan 16, 1982; CBS	No. 18	No. 16 Wichita State	W 99–88	12–2 (4–1)	Tulsa Convention Center (9,119); Tulsa, Oklahoma
Jan 21, 1982; Cable	No. 18	at Southern Illinois	W 77–74	13–2 (5–1)	SIU Arena (7,400); Carbondale, Illinois
Jan 23, 1982; Cable	No. 10	at Indiana State	L 59–60	13–3 (5–2)	Hulman Center (5,124); Terre Haute, Indiana
Jan 28, 1982	No. 16	West Texas State	W 68–61	14–3 (6–2)	Tulsa Convention Center (8,759); Tulsa, Oklahoma
Jan 30, 1982; KJRH	No. 16	New Mexico State	W 76–72	15–3 (7–2)	Tulsa Convention Center (9,119); Tulsa, Oklahoma
Feb 6, 1982; MVC-TV	No. 11	at Wichita State	W 80–75	16–3 (8–2)	Levitt Arena (10,666); Wichita, Kansas
Feb 16, 1982	No. 7	Illinois State	W 78–67	17–3 (9–2)	Tulsa Convention Center (9,119); Tulsa, Oklahoma
Feb 13, 1982; Cable	No. 7	at Creighton	W 70–63	18–3 (10–2)	Omaha Civic Auditorium (6,293); Omaha, Nebraska
Feb 15, 1982; Cable	No. 6	at Drake	L 55–56	18–4 (10–3)	Veterans Memorial Auditorium (7,790); Des Moines, Iowa
Feb 20, 1982; MVC-TV	No. 8	Indiana State	W 77–64	19–4 (11–3)	Tulsa Convention Center (9,119); Tulsa, Oklahoma
Feb 22, 1982	No. 8	Southern Illinois	W 85–67	20–4 (12–3)	Tulsa Convention Center (8,924); Tulsa, Oklahoma
Feb 25, 1982*; KJRH	No. 8	Oral Roberts	W 91–70	21–4	Tulsa Convention Center (9,119); Tulsa, Oklahoma
Feb 27, 1982; NBC	No. 8	at Bradley	L 79–82 ^{OT}	21–5 (12–4)	Robertson Memorial Field House (7,300); Peoria, Illinois
MVC Tournament
Mar 5, 1982*; Cable	No. 10	Creighton; Quarterfinals	W 106–81	22–5	Tulsa Convention Center (7,932); Tulsa, Oklahoma
Mar 6, 1982*; Cable	No. 10	New Mexico State; Semifinals	W 85–61	23–5	Tulsa Convention Center (9,119); Tulsa, Oklahoma
Mar 7, 1982*; NBC	No. 10	Illinois State; Championship game	W 90–77	24–5	Tulsa Convention Center (9,119); Tulsa, Oklahoma
NCAA Tournament
Mar 13, 1982*; CBS	(3 MW) No. 10	vs. (6 MW) Houston; Second round	L 74–78	24–6	Mabee Center (10,775); Tulsa, Oklahoma
*Non-conference game. ^{#}Rankings from AP. (#) Tournament seedings in parentheses. ME=Mideast. All times are in Central.

== NBA draft ==
Round	Pick	Player	NBA Team
1	20	Paul Pressey	Milwaukee Bucks
