= 1982 Sun Belt Conference men's basketball tournament =

- Classification: Division I
- Season: 1981–82
- Teams: 6
- Site: Birmingham–Jefferson Civic Center; Birmingham, Alabama
- Champions: UAB (1st title)
- Winning coach: Gene Bartow (1st title)
- MVP: Oliver Robinson (UAB)

1981–82 Sun Belt Conference men's basketball standings
	Conf.				Overall
Team	W		L	PCT	W		L	PCT
No. 17 UAB †	9	–	1	.900	25	–	6	.806
VCU	7	–	3	.700	17	–	11	.607
Jacksonville	5	–	5	.500	14	–	13	.519
South Florida	4	–	6	.400	17	–	11	.607
UNC Charlotte	3	–	7	.300	15	–	12	.556
South Alabama	2	–	8	.200	12	–	16	.429
† 1982 Sun Belt Conference tournament winner Rankings from AP Poll

The 1982 Sun Belt Conference Men's Basketball Tournament was held February 26–28 at the Birmingham–Jefferson Civic Center in Birmingham, Alabama.

In a rematch of the previous two finals (both won by the Rams), UAB topped VCU in the championship game, 94–83, to win their first Sun Belt Men's Basketball Tournament.

The Blazers, in turn, received an automatic bid for the 1982 NCAA Tournament, where they advanced to the Elite Eight (UAB defeated Indiana in the Second Round and Virginia in the Sweet Sixteen before ultimately losing to Louisville).

== Format ==
With the departure of Georgia State before the season, the Sun Belt's membership decreased once again to six teams. In turn, the two top-seeded teams were given byes to the semifinal rounds while the remaining four teams entered the competition in the first round. All teams were seeded based on regular season conference records.

== Bracket ==
Quarterfinals; Friday, February 26
5	UNC Charlotte	59
4	South Florida	66
3	Jacksonville	75
6	South Alabama	77

Semifinals; Saturday, February 27
1	UAB	66
4	South Florida	56
6	South Alabama	66
2	VCU	68

Championship; Sunday, February 28
1	UAB	94
2	VCU	83
