= 1981–82 Minnesota Golden Gophers men's basketball team =

American college basketball season

1981–82 Minnesota Golden Gophers men's basketball

Big Ten Champions

NCAA Men's Division I Tournament, Sweet Sixteen
- Conference: Big Ten Conference

Ranking
- Coaches: No. 6
- AP: No. 7
- Record: 23–6 (14–4 Big Ten)
- Head coach: Jim Dutcher
- Assistant coach: Jimmy Williams
- Home arena: Williams Arena

1981–82 Big Ten Conference men's basketball standings
	Conf.				Overall
Team	W		L	PCT	W		L	PCT
No. 7 Minnesota	14	–	4	.778	23	–	6	.793
No. 16 Iowa	12	–	6	.667	21	–	8	.724
Ohio State	12	–	6	.667	21	–	10	.677
Indiana	12	–	6	.667	19	–	10	.655
Purdue	11	–	7	.611	18	–	14	.563
Illinois	10	–	8	.556	18	–	11	.621
Michigan State	6	–	12	.333	11	–	17	.393
Michigan	6	–	12	.333	7	–	20	.259
Northwestern	4	–	14	.222	8	–	19	.296
Wisconsin*	1	–	17	.056	4	–	23	.148
Rankings from AP Poll; *Wisconsin forfeited all games after Jan 25, 1982 due to NCAA sanctions. Disputed record (3–15, 6–23)

The 1981–82 Minnesota Golden Gophers men's basketball team represented the University of Minnesota as a member of the Big Ten Conference during the 1981–82 NCAA Division I men's basketball season. Led by head coach Jim Dutcher, the Gophers won the Big Ten title with a conference record of 14–4, and finished with an overall record of 23–6.

== Roster ==
1981–82 Minnesota Golden Gophers men's basketball team
Players
Coaches

Pos.	#	Name	Height	Weight	Year	Hometown
F/C	20	Jim Petersen	6 ft 10 in (2.08 m)	225 lb (102 kg)	So	St. Louis Park, Minnesota
G	32	Trent Tucker	6 ft 5 in (1.96 m)	185 lb (84 kg)	Sr
C	45	Randy Breuer	7 ft 3 in (2.21 m)	225 lb (102 kg)	Jr	Lake City, Minnesota

Head coach

- Jim Dutcher (Michigan)

Assistant coach(es)

Legend

- (C) Team captain
- (S) Suspended
- (I) Ineligible
- (W) Walk-on
- Injured
- Current redshirt

== Schedule and results ==
Date time, TV	Rank^{#}	Opponent^{#}	Result	Record	Site city, state
Non-conference regular season
Nov 30, 1981*	No. 10	San Francisco State	W 88–69	1–0	Williams Arena; Minneapolis, Minnesota
Dec 2, 1981*	No. 10	Dayton	W 90–74	2–0	Williams Arena; Minneapolis, Minnesota
Dec 4, 1981*	No. 10	at Loyola-Chicago	W 61–60	3–0	Alumni Gym; Chicago, Illinois
Dec 8, 1981*	No. 8	Drake	W 80–55	4–0	Williams Arena; Minneapolis, Minnesota
Dec 19, 1981*	No. 8	at Marquette	W 76–54	5–0	MECCA Arena; Milwaukee, Wisconsin
Dec 21, 1981*	No. 8	at Kansas State	L 52–62	5–1	Ahearn Field House; Manhattan, Kansas
Dec 28, 1981*	No. 9	Army; Pillsbury Classic	W 79–37	6–1	Williams Arena; Minneapolis, Minnesota
Dec 29, 1981*	No. 9	Arizona; Pillsbury Classic	W 91–62	7–1	Williams Arena; Minneapolis, Minnesota
Jan 2, 1982*	No. 9	Long Beach State	W 75–67	8–1	Williams Arena; Minneapolis, Minnesota
Big Ten Conference Regular season
Jan 7, 1982	No. 6	at Ohio State	L 47–49	8–2 (0–1)	St. John Arena; Columbus, Ohio
Jan 9, 1982	No. 6	at Michigan State	W 64–58	9–2 (1–1)	Jenison Field House; East Lansing, Michigan
Jan 14, 1982	No. 11	No. 5 Iowa	W 61–56	10–2 (2–1)	Williams Arena; Minneapolis, Minnesota
Jan 16, 1982	No. 11	Michigan	W 67–58	11–2 (3–1)	Williams Arena; Minneapolis, Minnesota
Jan 21, 1982	No. 5	at Wisconsin	W 78–57	12–2 (4–1)	Wisconsin Field House; Madison, Wisconsin
Jan 23, 1982	No. 5	Illinois	L 57–64	12–3 (4–2)	Williams Arena; Minneapolis, Minnesota
Jan 28, 1982	No. 10	at Northwestern	W 61–53	13–3 (5–2)	Welsh-Ryan Arena; Evanston, Illinois
Jan 30, 1982	No. 10	at Indiana	W 69–62	14–3 (6–2)	Assembly Hall; Bloomington, Indiana
Feb 4, 1982	No. 6	Purdue	W 73–50	15–3 (7–2)	Williams Arena; Minneapolis, Minnesota
Feb 6, 1982	No. 6	Indiana	L 55–58	15–4 (7–3)	Williams Arena; Minneapolis, Minnesota
Feb 11, 1982	No. 9	Wisconsin	W 71–60	16–4 (8–3)	Williams Arena; Minneapolis, Minnesota
Feb 13, 1982	No. 9	at Purdue	W 53–52	17–4 (9–3)	Mackey Arena; West Lafayette, Indiana
Feb 18, 1982	No. 8	Northwestern	W 76–66	18–4 (10–3)	Williams Arena; Minneapolis, Minnesota
Feb 20, 1982	No. 8	at Illinois	L 65–77	18–5 (10–4)	Assembly Hall; Champaign, Illinois
Feb 25, 1982	No. 13	at Michigan	W 61–50	19–5 (11–4)	Crisler Arena; Ann Arbor, Michigan
Feb 27, 1982	No. 13	at No. 11 Iowa	W 57–55 ^{3OT}	20–5 (12–4)	Iowa Field House; Iowa City, Iowa
Mar 4, 1982	No. 7	Michigan State	W 54–51	21–5 (13–4)	Williams Arena; Minneapolis, Minnesota
Mar 6, 1982	No. 7	Ohio State	W 87–75	22–5 (14–4)	Williams Arena; Minneapolis, Minnesota
NCAA tournament
Mar 14, 1982*	(2 ME) No. 7	vs. (10 ME) Chattanooga; Second Round	W 62–61	23–5	Market Square Arena; Indianapolis, Indiana
Mar 18, 1982*	(2 ME) No. 7	vs. (3 ME) No. 20 Louisville; Mideast Regional semifinal	L 61–67	23–6	Birmingham–Jefferson Civic Center; Birmingham, Alabama
*Non-conference game. ^{#}Rankings from AP Poll. (#) Tournament seedings in parentheses. ME=Mideast.

== Team players in the 1982 NBA draft ==
Round	Pick	Player	NBA club
1	6	Trent Tucker	New York Knicks
