= Bob Donewald =

American college basketball coach (born 1942)

Biographical details
- Born: May 29, 1942 (age 84); Hanover, Indiana, U.S.
- Education: Hanover

Coaching career (HC unless noted)
- 1965–1973: St. Joseph HS (IN)
- 1974–1978: Indiana (assistant)
- 1978–1989: Illinois State
- 1989–2000: Western Michigan

Head coaching record
- Tournaments: 3–4 (NCAA Division I); 3–4 (NIT)

Accomplishments and honors

Championships
- MVC tournament (1983); MVC regular season (1984); MAC regular season (1998)

Awards
- MVC Coach of the Year (1984); MAC Coach of the Year (1992)

Robert Michael Donewald Sr. (born May 29, 1942) is a retired American college basketball coach. He coached at South Bend St. Joseph's High School for eight seasons, from 1965–66 to 1972–73. He was the first coach to lead Illinois State University to the NCAA post-season national tournament, and he did so for three consecutive seasons. His 1982–83 squad gave Illinois State its first Missouri Valley Conference basketball championship and his 1983–84 team captured the university's first Division I NCAA Tournament victory.

Donewald was an assistant coach under Indiana University coach Bobby Knight, for four seasons (1974–75 to 1977–78) and was a member of the Hoosiers staff in 1976 when Indiana went undefeated and won the national title. In 1978, Donewald agreed to be the head coach position at Brown University but backed out twenty minutes before an introductory press conference at the university to announce the hiring. Rumor is that, while riding to the event, Donewald told Brown Athletic Director Robert A. Seiple he would walk to the airport. Three weeks later, Donewald was hired as the new head coach of the Illinois State Redbirds, replacing the departing Gene Smithson.

In Donewald's second season, the Redbirds qualified for the NIT's post-season tournament, and then, in 1983, the Redbirds entered March Madness for the first time in their history by winning the Missouri Valley Conference post-season tournament. Donewald's Redbirds also qualified for the NCAA tournament the next two seasons. Donewald began to acquire a national reputation, and in 1982 turned down an opportunity to coach the Wisconsin Badgers. His success was parlayed into a student referendum to build a new arena to replace Horton Field House, in use from 1963 to 1988. Redbird Arena was approved, and was built mostly from student fees collected over the next twenty years.

Donewald's ISU teams relied upon a slow moving game, similar to a four corners offense,, and with the introduction of the shot clock in the mid-1980s, his strategies and his teams began to suffer. In 1989, after failing to replicate his earlier successes, Donewald was fired by ISU. He was immediately hired as the coach of Western Michigan University.

In 1992, Donewald was named Coach of the Year for the Mid-American Conference. In the 1997–98 season (his ninth season as head coach at WMU) the Broncos qualified for the NCAA tournament, where they advanced to the second round before being eliminated. But Donewald was unable to get the Broncos back to the NCAA again, and was fired in 2000.

Donewald today lives with his wife of over forty years in their Kalamazoo, Michigan home, where he does consulting work for several college and professional teams. He also works occasionally as a color analyst. His son, Bob Donewald, Jr., is currently an assistant coach at the University of Texas.

== Head coaching record ==
Record table
Season	Team	Overall	Conference	Standing	Postseason
Illinois State Redbirds (Independent) (1978–1981)
1978–79	Illinois State	20–10			
1979–80	Illinois State	20–9			NIT Second Round
1980–81	Illinois State	16–11			
Illinois State Redbirds (Missouri Valley Conference) (1981–1989)
1981–82	Illinois State	17–12	9–7	5th	
1982–83	Illinois State	24–7	13–5	2nd	NCAA Division I First Round
1983–84	Illinois State	23–8	13–3	T–1st	NCAA Division I Second Round
1984–85	Illinois State	22–8	11–5	T–2nd	NCAA Division I Second Round
1985–86	Illinois State	15–14	9–7	4th	
1986–87	Illinois State	19–13	7–7	4th	NIT Quarterfinal
1987–88	Illinois State	18–13	9–5	3rd	NIT First Round
1988–89	Illinois State	13–17	6–8	T–5th	
Illinois State:		207–122 (.629)	77–47 (.621)		
Western Michigan Broncos (Mid-American Conference) (1989–2000)
1989–90	Western Michigan	9–18	3–13	9th	
1990–91	Western Michigan	5–22	2–14	9th	
1991–92	Western Michigan	21–9	11–5	T–2nd	NIT First Round
1992–93	Western Michigan	17–12	12–6	3rd	
1993–94	Western Michigan	14–14	7–11	8th	
1994–95	Western Michigan	14–13	9–9	7th	
1995–96	Western Michigan	16–11	13–5	2nd	
1996–97	Western Michigan	14–14	9–9	T–5th	
1997–98	Western Michigan	21–8	14–4	T–1st (West)	NCAA Division I Second Round
1998–99	Western Michigan	11–15	6–12	4th (West)	
1999–00	Western Michigan	10–18	6–12	5th (West)	
Western Michigan:		152–154 (.497)	92–100 (.479)		
Total:		359–276 (.565)	169–147 (.535)		
National champion Postseason invitational champion Conference regular season champion Conference regular season and conference tournament champion Division regular season champion Division regular season and conference tournament champion Conference tournament champion
