= 1982 Big Eight Conference men's basketball tournament =

- Classification: Division I
- Season: 1981–82
- Teams: 8
- First round site: Campus Sites; Campus Arenas
- Finals site: Kemper Arena; Kansas City, MO
- Champions: Missouri (2nd title)
- Winning coach: Norm Stewart (2nd title)
- MVP: Ricky Frazier (Missouri)

1981–82 Big Eight Conference men's basketball standings
	Conf.				Overall
Team	W		L	PCT	W		L	PCT
No. 5 Missouri †	12	–	2	.857	27	–	4	.871
Kansas State	10	–	4	.714	23	–	8	.742
Oklahoma	8	–	6	.571	22	–	11	.667
Nebraska	7	–	7	.500	16	–	12	.571
Oklahoma State	7	–	7	.500	15	–	12	.556
Iowa State	5	–	9	.357	10	–	17	.370
Kansas	4	–	10	.286	13	–	14	.481
Colorado	3	–	11	.214	11	–	16	.407
† 1982 Big Eight tournament winner Rankings from AP Poll

The 1982 Big Eight Conference men's basketball tournament was held March 2–6 at a combination of on-campus gymnasiums and Kemper Arena in Kansas City, Missouri.

Top-seeded Missouri defeated Oklahoma in the championship game, 68–63, to win their second Big Eight men's basketball tournament.

The Tigers, in turn, received an automatic bid to the 1982 NCAA tournament. They were joined in the tournament by fellow Big Eight member Kansas State, who earned an at-large bid.

== Format ==
All eight of the conference's members participated in the tournament field. They were seeded based on regular season conference records, with all teams placed and paired in the initial quarterfinal round.

All first-round games were played on the home court of the higher-seeded team. The semifinals and championship game, in turn, were played at a neutral site at Kemper Arena in Kansas City, Missouri.

== Bracket ==
Quarterfinals; Tuesday, March 2
1	#5 Missouri	72
8	Colorado	60
5	Oklahoma State	49
4	Nebraska	60
3	Oklahoma	71
6	Iowa State	67
7	Kansas	62
2	#17 Kansas State	74

Semifinals; Friday, March 5
1	#5 Missouri	58
4	Nebraska	53
3	Oklahoma	68
2	#17 Kansas State	62

Championship; Saturday, March 6
1	#5 Missouri	68
3	Oklahoma	63
