= 1982–83 Illinois State Redbirds men's basketball team =

American college basketball season

1982–83 Illinois State Redbirds men's basketball

MVC tournament champions

NCAA tournament, First Round
- Conference: Missouri Valley Conference
- Record: 24–7 (13–5 MVC)
- Head coach: Bob Donewald (5th season)
- Home arena: Horton Field House

1982–83 Missouri Valley Conference men's basketball standings
	Conf.				Overall
Team	W		L	PCT	W		L	PCT
No. 14 Wichita State	17	–	1	.944	25	–	3	.893
Illinois State †	13	–	5	.722	24	–	7	.774
New Mexico State	11	–	7	.611	18	–	11	.621
Tulsa	11	–	7	.611	19	–	12	.613
Bradley	10	–	8	.556	16	–	13	.552
Drake	9	–	9	.500	13	–	15	.464
Indiana State	5	–	13	.278	9	–	19	.321
West Texas State	5	–	13	.278	8	–	20	.286
Southern Illinois	5	–	13	.278	9	–	19	.321
Creighton	4	–	14	.222	8	–	19	.296
† 1983 MVC tournament winner Rankings from AP Poll

The 1982–83 Illinois State Redbirds men's basketball team represented Illinois State University during the 1982–83 NCAA Division I men's basketball season. The Redbirds, led by fifth year head coach Bob Donewald, played their home games at Horton Field House and were members of the Missouri Valley Conference.

The Redbirds finished the season 24–7, 13–5 in conference play to finish in second place. They were the number one seed for the Missouri Valley Conference tournament as Wichita State University, who finished first in the conference season, were serving the second of a two-year probation and therefore prohibited from postseason competition. They won the championship game over the University of Tulsa.

The Redbirds won the conference autobid to the 1983 NCAA Division I men's basketball tournament. They were assigned to the Mideast Regional as the number six seed and lost to Ohio University in the first round.

== Roster ==
1982–83 Illinois State Redbirds men's basketball team
Players
Coaches

Pos.	#	Name	Height	Weight	Year	Hometown
C	53	Rick Lamb	6 ft 7 in (2.01 m)	—	Sr	Illiopolis, IL
F	44	Raynard Malaine	6 ft 7 in (2.01 m)	—	Sr	Gary, IN
G	35	Vann Parkin (W)	—	—	Sr	Manito, IL
G	23	Dwayne Tyus	6 ft 2 in (1.88 m)	—	Sr	Chicago, IL
F	52	Hank Cornley	6 ft 7 in (2.01 m)	—	Jr	Columbus, OH
C	45	Mark Zwart	6 ft 8 in (2.03 m)	—	Jr	Monona, WI
G	33	Brad Duncan	6 ft 4 in (1.93 m)	—	So	Anderson, IN
G	24	Rickie Johnson	6 ft 5 in (1.96 m)	—	So	Indianapolis, IN
G	10	Michael McKenny	6 ft 1 in (1.85 m)	—	So	Gary, IN
F	43	Lou Stefanovic	6 ft 8 in (2.03 m)	—	So	Merillville, IN
G	25	William Anderson	5 ft 11 in (1.8 m)	—	Fr	Indianapolis, IN
G	32	Kirk Francis	6 ft 7 in (2.01 m)	—	Fr	Kewanee, IL
F	42	Jim McGrath (redshirt)	6 ft 8 in (2.03 m)	—	Fr	Ottawa, IL
C	54	Willie Williams	6 ft 9 in (2.06 m)	220 lb (100 kg)	Fr	Ames, IA

Head coach

- Bob Donewald (Hanover)

Assistant coach(es)

- Terry Smith
- Jim Platt (Concordia–Chicago)
- Pat Cunningham
- Bruce Stone
- Anthony Jones

Legend

- (C) Team captain
- (S) Suspended
- (I) Ineligible
- (W) Walk-on
- Injured
- Current redshirt

== Schedule ==
Date time, TV	Rank^{#}	Opponent^{#}	Result	Record	High points	High rebounds	High assists	Site (attendance) city, state
Exhibition Season
November 16, 1982*; 7:30 pm		Chinese Taipei	W 93–71		20 – Malaine	–	–	Horton Field House (4,857); Normal, IL
Regular Season
November 27, 1982*; 7:30 pm		Chicago State	W 62–54	1–0	13 – Duncan	11 – Cornley	–	Horton Field House (4,154); Normal, IL
November 30, 1982*; 7:30 pm		at Northern Illinois	W 54–45	2–0	18 – Lamb	14 – Lamb	–	Chick Evans Field House (6,036); DeKalb, IL
December 2, 1982*; 7:30 pm		Western Illinois	W 55–53	3–0	14 – Cornley	7 – Lamb	–	Horton Field House (5,298); Normal, IL
December 7, 1982*; 7:30 pm		DePaul	W 72–62	4–0	23 – Lamb	11 – Lamb	–	Horton Field House (8,068); Normal, IL
December 11, 1982*; 2:30 pm		Oral Roberts	W 54–40	5–0	14 – Cornley	7 – Lamb	–	Horton Field House (5,952); Normal, IL
December 17, 1982*		vs. Bowling Green State; Illini Classic [Semifinal]	W 61–57 ^{OT}	6–0	23 – Lamb	11 – Lamb	–	Assembly Hall (10,119); Champaign, IL
December 18, 1982*; 9:00 pm		at Illinois; Illini Classic [Final]	L 60–67	6–1	15 – Cornley	7 – Lamb, Cornley	7 – McKenny	Assembly Hall (14,328); Champaign, IL
December 22, 1982*; 7:30 pm		Eastern Illinois	W 82–67	7–1	20 – Lamb	13 – Lamb	–	Horton Field House (6,235); Normal, IL
December 30, 1982*; 7:30 pm		at Northern Iowa	W 66–60	8–1	18 – Tyus	7 – Lamb	–	UNI Dome (3,026); Cedar Falls, IA
January 6, 1983; 8:30 pm		at New Mexico State	W 72–62	9–1 (1–0)	18 – McKenny	11 – Malaine	–	Pan American Center (8,621); Las Cruces, NM
January 8, 1983; 7:30 pm		at West Texas State	W 89–73	10–1 (2–0)	17 – Tyus	9 – Cornley	–	WTSU Fieldhouse (3,021); Canyon, TX
January 13, 1983; 7:30 pm		Bradley	W 77–69	11–1 (3–0)	23 – Lamb	9 – Lamb	–	Horton Field House (8,274); Normal, IL
January 15, 1983; 2:30 pm		Indiana State	W 96–82	12–1 (4–0)	22 – Tyus	9 – Lamb	–	Horton Field House (6,149); Normal, IL
January 22, 1983; 7:30 pm		Wichita State	W 54–53	13–1 (5–0)	15 – Tyus, Cornley	10 – Lamb	3 – McKenny	Horton Field House (8,274); Normal, IL
January 24, 1983; 7:30 pm	No. 17	Tulsa	W 61–55	14–1 (6–0)	13 – Cornley	10 – Cornley	–	Horton Field House (6,459); Normal, IL
January 27, 1983; 7:30 pm	No. 17	at Southern Illinois	W 69–63	15–1 (7–0)	19 – Lamb	8 – Lamb	–	SIU Arena (4,450); Carbondale, IL
January 31, 1983; 8:00 pm, WEEK	No. 16	at Bradley	W 56–55	16–1 (8–0)	15 – Cornley	7 – Cornley	–	Carver Arena (10,401); Peoria, IL
February 3, 1983; 7:30 pm	No. 16	Drake	W 65–59	17–1 (9–0)	15 – Tyus	10 – Lamb	–	Horton Field House (6,420); Normal, IL
February 5, 1983; 2:30 pm	No. 16	New Mexico State	L 50–66	17–2 (9–1)	25 – Cornley	12 – Cornley	–	Horton Field House (7,889); Normal, IL
February 10, 1983; 7:30 pm	No. 17	at Creighton	L 41–53	17–3 (9–2)	10 – Cornley	5 – Lamb, Tyus	3 – Zwart	Omaha Civic Auditorium (7,696); Omaha, NE
February 12, 1983; 7:30 pm	No. 17	at Drake	L 57–71	17–4 (9–3)	16 – Lamb	10 – Lamb	–	Veterans Memorial Auditorium (7,790); Des Moines, IA
February 19, 1983; 6:30 pm		at Indiana State	W 79–64	18–4 (10–3)	21 – Lamb	9 – Lamb	–	Hulman Center (4,880); Terre Haute, IN
February 21, 1983; 7:30 pm		West Texas State	W 74–59	19–4 (11–3)	20 – Cornley	13 – Lamb	–	Horton Field House (6,474); Normal, IL
February 24, 1983; 7:30 pm		Southern Illinois	W 63–54	20–4 (12–3)	15 – Duncan	10 – Cornley	–	Horton Field House (7,017); Normal, IL
February 26, 1983; 8:00 pm		at No. 12 Wichita State	L 62–72	20–5 (12–4)	16 – Lamb	5 – Lamb, Cornley	3 – Duncan, McKenny	Henry Levitt Arena (10,666); Wichita, KS
February 28, 1983; 7:30 pm		at Tulsa	L 59–61 ^{OT}	20–6 (12–5)	16 – Lamb	8 – Lamb	–	Tulsa Convention Center (9,047); Tulsa, OK
March 5, 1983; 2:30 pm		Creighton	W 94–63	21–6 (13–5)	21 – Lamb	7 – Lamb, Malaine	5 – Duncan	Horton Field House (7,535); Normal, IL
Missouri Valley Conference {MVC} tournament
March 10, 1983*	(1)	(8) Southern Illinois; Quarterfinal	W 64–54	22–6	18 – McKenny	8 – Lamb	4 – McKenny	Horton Field House (5,254); Normal, IL
March 11, 1983*	(1)	(4) Bradley; Semifinal	W 79–61	23–6	22 – Lamb	10 – Lamb	3 – Malaine, Cornley	Horton Field House (8,174); Normal, IL
March 12, 1983*; 1:00 pm, CBS	(1)	(2) Tulsa; Final	W 84–64	24–6	22 – Johnson	11 – Lamb	5 – McKenny	Horton Field House (6,485); Normal, IL
National Collegiate Athletic Association {NCAA} tournament
March 17, 1983*; 8:30 pm, NCAA Productions	(6)	vs. (11) Ohio; Mideast Region [First Round]	L 49–51	24–7	19 – Lamb	10 – Lamb	4 – McKenny	USF Sun Dome (8,023); Tampa, FL
*Non-conference game. ^{#}Rankings from AP Poll. (#) Tournament seedings in parentheses. All times are in Central Standard Time.
