= 1981–82 Illinois Fighting Illini men's basketball team =

American college basketball season

1981–82 Illinois Fighting Illini men's basketball

National Invitation Tournament, Second Round
- Conference: Big Ten Conference
- Record: 18–11 (10–8 Big Ten)
- Head coach: Lou Henson (7th season)
- Assistant coaches: Tony Yates (8th season); Dick Nagy (3rd season); Bob Hull (2nd season)
- MVPs: James Griffin; Perry Range
- Captains: James Griffin; Perry Range; Craig Tucker
- Home arena: Assembly Hall

1981–82 Big Ten Conference men's basketball standings
	Conf.				Overall
Team	W		L	PCT	W		L	PCT
No. 7 Minnesota	14	–	4	.778	23	–	6	.793
No. 16 Iowa	12	–	6	.667	21	–	8	.724
Ohio State	12	–	6	.667	21	–	10	.677
Indiana	12	–	6	.667	19	–	10	.655
Purdue	11	–	7	.611	18	–	14	.563
Illinois	10	–	8	.556	18	–	11	.621
Michigan State	6	–	12	.333	11	–	17	.393
Michigan	6	–	12	.333	7	–	20	.259
Northwestern	4	–	14	.222	8	–	19	.296
Wisconsin*	1	–	17	.056	4	–	23	.148
Rankings from AP Poll; *Wisconsin forfeited all games after Jan 25, 1982 due to NCAA sanctions. Disputed record (3–15, 6–23)

The 1981–82 Illinois Fighting Illini men's basketball team represented the University of Illinois.

== Regular season ==
The 1982 season brought Illinois another post-season appearance, in the NIT, and an 18–11 record. Derek Harper led the Big Ten in assists and steals.

=== Roster ===
1981–82 Illinois Fighting Illini men's basketball team
Players
Coaches

Pos.	#	Name	Height	Weight	Year	Previous school	Hometown
G	10	Craig Tucker (C)	6 ft 1 in (1.85 m)	175 lb (79 kg)	Sr	Flint Northern High School	Flint, Michigan
F	11	Dan Klier	6 ft 4 in (1.93 m)	185 lb (84 kg)	Jr	Naperville Central High School	Naperville, Illinois
G	12	Derek Harper	6 ft 4 in (1.93 m)	185 lb (84 kg)	So	North Shore High School	West Palm Beach, Florida
C	13	James Griffin (C)	6 ft 10 in (2.08 m)	205 lb (93 kg)	Sr	Dunbar High School	Grandview, Texas
G	14	Mike O'Brien	6 ft 2 in (1.88 m)	165 lb (75 kg)	So	Richwoods High School	Peoria, Illinois
G	20	Kevin Bontemps	6 ft 2 in (1.88 m)	180 lb (82 kg)	Jr	Morton High School	Morton, Illinois
G	21	Quinn Richardson	5 ft 11 in (1.8 m)	175 lb (79 kg)	Jr	Eisenhower High School	Robbins, Illinois
G	22	Perry Range (C)	6 ft 4 in (1.93 m)	180 lb (82 kg)	Sr	South Beloit High School	South Beloit, Illinois
F	23	George Montgomery	6 ft 8 in (2.03 m)	215 lb (98 kg)	Fr	Corliss High School	Chicago, Illinois
F	32	Jay Daniels	6 ft 7 in (2.01 m)	185 lb (84 kg)	Fr	John I. Leonard High School	West Palm Beach, Florida
F	34	Dee Maras	6 ft 7 in (2.01 m)	225 lb (102 kg)	Fr	Antioch Community High School	Antioch, Illinois
F	43	Bryan Leonard	6 ft 10 in (2.08 m)	230 lb (104 kg)	RS Jr	Belleville High School-East	Belleville, Illinois
F	44	Anthony Welch	6 ft 9 in (2.06 m)	180 lb (82 kg)	Fr	Creston High School	Grand Rapids, Michigan

Head coach

- Lou Henson (New Mexico State University) (7th year)

Assistant coach(es)

- Tony Yates (University of Cincinnati) (8th year)
- Dick Nagy (Hardin-Simmons University) (3rd year)
- Bob Hull (2nd year)

Legend

- (C) Team captain
- (S) Suspended
- (I) Ineligible
- (W) Walk-on
- Injured
- Current redshirt

Roster

== Schedule ==
Date time, TV	Rank^{#}	Opponent^{#}	Result	Record	Site (attendance) city, state
Non-Conference regular season
11/28/1981*		at Loyola (Chicago)	W 87–83 ^{ot}	1–0	Chicago Stadium (13,827); Chicago, IL
12/5/1981*		Kansas State	W 55–49	2–0	Assembly Hall (15,106); Champaign, IL
12/8/1981*		vs. No. 13 Missouri; Braggin' Rights	L 68–78 ^{ot}	2–1	St. Louis Arena (15,187); St. Louis, MO
12/11/1981*		Army; Illini Classic	W 72–37	3–1	Assembly Hall (14,257); Champaign, IL
12/12/1981*		Texas A&M; Illini Classic	W 76–63	4–1	Assembly Hall (15,126); Champaign, IL
12/19/1981*		St. Louis	W 53–43	5–1	Assembly Hall (14,094); Champaign, IL
12/22/1981*		North Dakota State	W 90–61	6–1	Assembly Hall (14,755); Champaign, IL
12/28/1981*		vs. Bowling Green; Blade-Glass City Classic	W 56–51	7–1	Centennial Hall (9,089); Toledo, OH
12/29/1981*		at Toledo; Blade-Glass City Classic	L 51–71	7–2	Centennial Hall (9,108); Toledo, OH
Big Ten regular season
1/7/1982		at Northwestern; Rivalry	W 60–50	8–2 (1–0)	McGaw Memorial Hall (7,183); Evanston, IL
1/9/1982		at No. 7 Iowa; Rivalry	L 50–56	8–3 (1–1)	Iowa Field House (13,356); Iowa City, IA
1/14/1982		Ohio State	L 50–51 ^{ot}	8–4 (1–2)	Assembly Hall (15,579); Champaign, IL
1/16/1982		Michigan State	W 55–51	9–4 (2–2)	Assembly Hall (15,290); Champaign, IL
1/21/1982		Indiana; Rivalry	L 53–54	9–5 (2–3)	Assembly Hall (16,768); Champaign, IL
1/23/1982		at No. 5 Minnesota	W 64–57	10–5 (3–3)	Williams Arena (17,218); Minneapolis, MN
1/28/1982		at Purdue	W 63–48	11–5 (4–3)	Mackey Arena (13,946); West Lafayette, IN
1/30/1982		Michigan	W 79–61	12–5 (5–3)	Assembly Hall (16,186); Champaign, IL
2/4/1982		Wisconsin	W 88–54	13–5 (6–3)	Assembly Hall (15,763); Champaign, IL
2/6/1982		at Michigan	L 53–58	13–6 (6–4)	Crisler Arena (9,208); Ann Arbor, MI
2/11/1982		at Indiana; Rivalry	L 60–73	13–7 (6–5)	Assembly Hall (16,502); Bloomington, IN
2/13/1982		at Wisconsin	W 68–60	14–7 (7–5)	Wisconsin Field House (6,387); Madison, WI
2/18/1982		Purdue	L 44–52	14–8 (7–6)	Assembly Hall (15,817); Champaign, IL
2/20/1982		No. 8 Minnesota	W 77–65	15–8 (8–6)	Assembly Hall (16,578); Champaign, IL
2/25/1982		at Michigan State	L 47–56	15–9 (8–7)	Jenison Fieldhouse (10,004); East Lansing, MI
2/27/1982		at Ohio State	L 53–63	15–10 (8–8)	St. John Arena (13,591); Columbus, OH
3/4/1982		No. 11 Iowa; Rivalry	W 73–67 ^{ot}	16–10 (9–8)	Assembly Hall (16,413); Champaign, IL
3/6/1982*		Northwestern; Rivalry	W 85–65	17–10 (10–8)	Assembly Hall (16,396); Champaign, IL
National Invitation Tournament
3/10/1982		Long Island; NIT First Round	W 126–78	18–10	Assembly Hall (10,505); Champaign, IL
3/15/1982*		Dayton; NIT Second Round	L 58–61	18–11	Assembly Hall (16,275); Champaign, IL
*Non-conference game. ^{#}Rankings from AP Poll. (#) Tournament seedings in parentheses. All times are in Central Time.

== Player stats ==
Player	Games played	Minutes played	Field goals	Free throws	Rebounds	Assists	Blocks	Steals	Points
Craig Tucker	29	1001	170	110	69	84	1	32	450
James Griffin	29	963	171	52	204	27	56	19	394
Perry Range	29	1059	146	83	128	71	7	37	375
Derek Harper	29	1059	105	34	133	145	16	67	244
Bryan Leonard	29	629	47	23	110	49	14	12	117
George Montgomery	28	462	41	20	104	13	10	8	102
Jay Daniels	27	294	38	17	41	12	4	7	93
Anthony Welch	26	260	30	17	39	12	5	4	77
Kevin Bontemps	21	76	9	4	6	14	0	4	22
Quinn Richardson	18	50	6	10	4	7	0	3	22
Dee Maras	12	19	0	8	5	1	0	0	8
Dan Klier	10	6	3	0	11	0	0	0	6
Mike O'Brien	5	6	2	0	2	0	0	0	4
Scott Palmer	5	6	0	0	0	0	0	0	0

== Awards and honors ==
- Derek Harper
  - Fighting Illini All-Century team (2005)
- James Griffin & Perry Range
  - Team Co-Most Valuable Players

== Team players drafted into the NBA ==
Player	NBA club	Round	Pick
Craig Tucker	New York Knickerbockers	3	57
James Griffin	New Jersey Nets	4	80
Perry Range	Kansas City Kings	7	143
Brian Leonard	Milwaukee Bucks	8	181
