= Gene Bartow =

American basketball coach

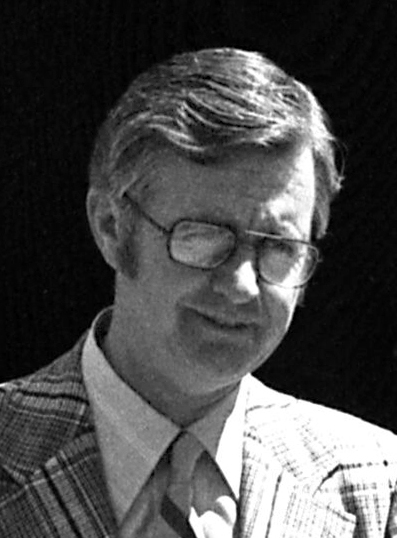
- Bartow in 1975

Biographical details
- Born: August 18, 1930; Browning, Missouri, U.S.
- Died: January 3, 2012 (aged 81); Birmingham, Alabama, U.S.
- Education: Northeast Missouri State College

Coaching career (HC unless noted)
- 1955–1957: South Shelby HS (MO)
- 1957–1961: St. Charles HS (MO)
- 1961–1964: Central Missouri State
- 1964–1970: Valparaiso
- 1970–1974: Memphis State
- 1974–1975: Illinois
- 1975–1977: UCLA
- 1978–1996: UAB

Administrative career (AD unless noted)
- 1977–2000: UAB

Head coaching record
- Overall: 647–353 (college); 145–39 (high school)
- Tournaments: 14–12 (NCAA Division I); 4–3 (NCAA Division II); 9–7 (NIT)

Accomplishments and honors

Championships
- 2 NCAA Division I tournament Final Four (1973, 1976); MSHAA (1957); 2 MVC regular season (1972, 1973); 2 Pac-8 regular season (1976, 1977); 4 Sun Belt tournament (1982–1984, 1987); 3 Sun Belt regular season (1981, 1982, 1990)

Awards
- NABC Coach of the Year (1973); MVC Coach of the Year (1972); 3x Sun Belt Coach of the Year (1981, 1982, 1985)
- College Basketball Hall of Fame; Inducted in 2009

Bobby Gene Bartow (August 18, 1930 – January 3, 2012) was an American men's college basketball coach. The Browning, Missouri, native coached 36 years at six universities after coaching two high schools in Missouri for six years. In 1972 Bartow coached the Puerto Rico national basketball team in the 1972 Munich Olympic Games.

== High school ==
Bartow began his coaching at the prep level in Missouri, coaching Shelbina and St. Charles High School basketball squads to a 145–39 win–loss mark in six seasons. His 1957 St. Charles team won the state championship, defeating North Kansas City in the Class L finals by a score of 60–54.

== College ==
Bartow coached at Central Missouri State University from 1961 to 1964, Valparaiso University from 1964 to 1970, and Memphis State University from 1970 until 1974, and he led the Memphis State Tigers to the 1973 NCAA national championship game and consecutive Missouri Valley Conference titles in the 1971–72 and 1972–73 seasons. He coached the US national team in the 1974 FIBA World Championship, winning the bronze medal.

Bartow replaced Harv Schmidt as head coach at the University of Illinois on 9 March 1974. The Fighting Illini finished tied for last in the Big Ten Conference at 4–14 (8–18 overall) in his only season with Illinois in 1975. Disenchanted that recruiting violations committed by his predecessor resulted in the program being placed on two years probation subsequent to him accepting the position, he requested and was granted a release from the remaining four years of his contract. He was succeeded by Lou Henson on 5 April 1975.

=== UCLA ===
Bartow's departure from Illinois allowed him to succeed John Wooden as the head coach at UCLA on 2 April 1975. He led the Bruins from 1975 to 1977, guiding them to Pac-8 titles and a 52–9 (.852) record, including a berth in the Final Four in 1976, falling to Indiana, the undefeated eventual champion. In 1977, his second-ranked UCLA lost to unranked Idaho State by a point in the Sweet Sixteen at Provo, Utah. As of 2023, his two seasons had the second-highest winning percentage at UCLA, behind Gary Cunningham (.862).

=== UAB ===
After just two years at UCLA, Bartow left in 1977 to take over the job of creating an athletic program at the University of Alabama at Birmingham (UAB). He served as the Blazers' first head basketball coach and athletic director for 18 years. Bartow led UAB to the NIT in 1980, the program's second year of existence, and followed that up with seven straight NCAA tournament appearances, including advancements to the Sweet Sixteen in 1981 and the Elite Eight in 1982.

Bartow retired from coaching in 1996, and in 1997, UAB renamed its basketball venue Bartow Arena in his honor. His son Murry, a UAB assistant, became the coach upon Bartow's retirement; Bartow was later president of Hoops, LP, the company that runs the Memphis Grizzlies and the FedEx Forum.

=== Honors ===
In 1989, Bartow was inducted into the Alabama Sports Hall of Fame, 10 years later, in 1999, Central Missouri State (now the University of Central Missouri) also elected him to theirs. Bartow was also voted one of Valparaiso University's 150 most influential people in October 2009. Bartow was inducted into the National Collegiate Basketball Hall of Fame in Kansas City on November 22, 2009, along with fellow inductees Magic Johnson, Larry Bird, Wayman Tisdale, Jud Heathcote, Walter Byers, Travis Grant and Bill Wall. In 2013, Bartow was selected for induction into the Mid-America Intercollegiate Athletics Association (MIAA) Hall of Fame.

== Death ==
On April 15, 2009, a UAB spokesman revealed that Bartow had been diagnosed with stomach cancer; he died at his home in Birmingham in early 2012 from the disease.

== Head coaching record ==
=== College ===
Record table
| Season | Team | Overall | Conference | Standing | Postseason |
|---|---|---|---|---|---|
Central Missouri State Mules (Missouri Intercollegiate Athletic Association) (1961–1964)
| 1961–62 | Central Missouri State | 16–6 | 9–3 | | |
| 1962–63 | Central Missouri State | 17–6 | 9–4 | | |
| 1963–64 | Central Missouri State | 14–9 | 7–4 | | |
| Central Missouri State: | | 47–21 | 25–11 | | |
Valparaiso Crusaders (Indiana Collegiate Conference) (1964–1970)
| 1964–65 | Valparaiso | 13–12 | 5–7 | 3rd | |
| 1965–66 | Valparaiso | 18–10 | 7–5 | 4th | NCAA College Division Regional Final |
| 1966–67 | Valparaiso | 21–8 | 7–5 | 2nd | NCAA College Division Elite Eight |
| 1967–68 | Valparaiso | 11–15 | 3–9 | 6th | |
| 1968–69 | Valparaiso | 16–12 | 4–4 | T–2nd | NCAA College Division Regional Final |
| 1969–70 | Valparaiso | 13–13 | 2–6 | 5th | |
| Valparaiso: | | 92–70 | 28–36 | | |
Memphis State Tigers (Missouri Valley Conference) (1970–1973)
| 1970–71 | Memphis State | 18–8 | 8–6 | 4th | |
| 1971–72 | Memphis State | 21–7 | 12–2 | T–1st | NIT First Round |
| 1972–73 | Memphis State | 24–6 | 12–2 | 1st | NCAA University Division Runner-up |
Memphis State Tigers (NCAA Division I independent) (1973–1974)
| 1973–74 | Memphis State | 19–11 | | | NIT Quarterfinals |
| Memphis State: | | 82–32 | 32–10 | | |
Illinois Fighting Illini (Big Ten Conference) (1974–1975)
| 1974–75 | Illinois | 8–18 | 4–14 | T–9th | |
| Illinois: | | 8–18 | 4–14 | | |
UCLA Bruins (Pacific-8 Conference) (1975–1977)
| 1975–76 | UCLA | 28–4† | 13–1 | 1st | NCAA Division I Third Place |
| 1976–77 | UCLA | 24–5 | 11–3 | 1st | NCAA Division I Sweet 16 |
| UCLA: | | 52–9 | 24–4 | | |
UAB Blazers (NCAA Division I independent) (1978–1979)
| 1978–79 | UAB | 15–11 | | | |
UAB Blazers (Sun Belt Conference) (1979–1991)
| 1979–80 | UAB | 18–12 | 10–4 | T–2nd | NIT First Round |
| 1980–81 | UAB | 23–9 | 9–3 | T–1st | NCAA Division I Sweet 16 |
| 1981–82 | UAB | 25–6 | 9–1 | 1st | NCAA Division I Elite Eight |
| 1982–83 | UAB | 19–14 | 9–5 | 3rd | NCAA Division I First Round |
| 1983–84 | UAB | 23–11 | 8–6 | 5th | NCAA Division I First Round |
| 1984–85 | UAB | 25–9 | 11–3 | 2nd | NCAA Division I Second Round |
| 1985–86 | UAB | 25–11 | 9–5 | T–3rd | NCAA Division I Second Round |
| 1986–87 | UAB | 21–11 | 10–4 | 3rd | NCAA Division I First Round |
| 1987–88 | UAB | 16–15 | 7–7 | 5th | |
| 1988–89 | UAB | 22–12 | 8–6 | 4th | NIT Third Place |
| 1989–90 | UAB | 22–9 | 12–2 | 1st | NCAA Division I First Round |
| 1990–91 | UAB | 18–13 | 9–5 | 2nd | NIT First Round |
UAB Blazers (Great Midwest Conference) (1991–1995)
| 1991–92 | UAB | 20–9 | 4–6 | 5th | NIT First Round |
| 1992–93 | UAB | 21–14 | 5–5 | 4th | NIT Third Place |
| 1993–94 | UAB | 22–8 | 8–4 | T–2nd | NCAA Division I First Round |
| 1994–95 | UAB | 14–16 | 5–7 | 6th | |
UAB Blazers (Conference USA) (1995–1996)
| 1995–96 | UAB | 16–14 | 6–8 | 2nd (Red) | |
| UAB: | | 365–204 | 139–81 | | |
| Total: | | 647–353 | | | |
National champion Postseason invitational champion Conference regular season champion Conference regular season and conference tournament champion Division regular season champion Division regular season and conference tournament champion Conference tournament champion

== See also ==
- List of college men's basketball coaches with 600 wins
- List of NCAA Division I Men's Final Four appearances by coach
