= 1981–82 Missouri Tigers men's basketball team =

American college basketball season

1981–82 Missouri Tigers men's basketball

Big Eight tournament champions Big Eight Regular Season Champions

NCAA tournament, Sweet Sixteen
- Conference: Big Eight Conference

Ranking
- Coaches: No. 5
- AP: No. 5
- Record: 27–4 (12–2 Big 8)
- Head coach: Norm Stewart (15th season)
- Home arena: Hearnes Center

1981–82 Big Eight Conference men's basketball standings
	Conf.				Overall
Team	W		L	PCT	W		L	PCT
No. 5 Missouri †	12	–	2	.857	27	–	4	.871
Kansas State	10	–	4	.714	23	–	8	.742
Oklahoma	8	–	6	.571	22	–	11	.667
Nebraska	7	–	7	.500	16	–	12	.571
Oklahoma State	7	–	7	.500	15	–	12	.556
Iowa State	5	–	9	.357	10	–	17	.370
Kansas	4	–	10	.286	13	–	14	.481
Colorado	3	–	11	.214	11	–	16	.407
† 1982 Big Eight tournament winner Rankings from AP Poll

The 1981–82 Missouri Tigers men's basketball team represented the University of Missouri as a member of the Big Eight Conference during the 1981–82 NCAA men's basketball season. Led by head coach Norm Stewart, the Tigers won the Big Eight regular season and tournament titles, reached the Sweet 16 of the NCAA tournament, and finished with an overall record of 27–4 (12–2 Big Eight).

== Roster ==
- Ricky Frazier, Jr.
- Steve Stipanovich, Jr.
- Jon Sundvold, Jr.
- Head coach: Norm Stewart

== Schedule and results ==
Date time, TV	Rank^{#}	Opponent^{#}	Result	Record	Site (attendance) city, state
Regular season
Dec 1, 1981*	No. 16	Alcorn State	W 82–51	1–0	Hearnes Center; Columbia, Missouri
Dec 4, 1981*	No. 16	East Carolina; Show-Me Classic	W 87–55	2–0	Hearnes Center; Columbia, Missouri
Dec 5, 1981*	No. 16	Wyoming; Show-Me Classic	W 64–54	3–0	Hearnes Center; Columbia, Missouri
Dec 8, 1981*	No. 13	vs. Illinois; Braggin' Rights	W 78–68 ^{OT}	4–0	St. Louis Arena (15,187); St. Louis, Missouri
Dec 12, 1981*	No. 13	Baylor	W 70–51	5–0	Hearnes Center; Columbia, Missouri
Dec 21, 1981*	No. 11	Youngstown State	W 97–60	6–0	Hearnes Center; Columbia, Missouri
Dec 27, 1981*	No. 9	vs. No. 19 UAB	W 98–80	7–0	L.A. Sports Arena; Los Angeles, California
Dec 28, 1981*	No. 7	at Southern California	W 65–58	8–0	L.A. Sports Arena; Los Angeles, California
Jan 2, 1982*	No. 7	vs. Notre Dame	W 92–70	9–0	Kemper Arena; Kansas City, Missouri
Jan 6, 1982*	No. 4	Austin Peay	W 81–63	10–0	Hearnes Center; Columbia, Missouri
Jan 9, 1982	No. 4	at Colorado	W 72–50	11–0 (1–0)	CU Events/Conference Center; Boulder, Colorado
Jan 13, 1982	No. 2	Oklahoma State	W 54–49	12–0 (2–0)	Hearnes Center; Columbia, Missouri
Jan 16, 1982	No. 2	at Nebraska	W 44–42	13–0 (3–0)	Bob Devaney Sports Center; Lincoln, Nebraska
Jan 17, 1982*; NBC	No. 2	vs. No. 17 Louisville	W 69–55	14–0	St. Louis Arena; St. Louis, Missouri
Jan 20, 1982	No. 2	Kansas; Border War	W 41–35	15–0 (4–0)	Hearnes Center; Columbia, Missouri
Jan 23, 1982	No. 2	Oklahoma	W 84–64	16–0 (5–0)	Hearnes Center; Columbia, Missouri
Jan 27, 1982	No. 1	at Iowa State	W 86–73	17–0 (6–0)	Hilton Coliseum; Ames, Iowa
Jan 30, 1982	No. 1	at No. 14 Kansas State	W 59–58	18–0 (7–0)	Ahearn Field House; Manhattan, Kansas
Feb 3, 1982	No. 1	Colorado	W 80–54	19–0 (8–0)	Hearnes Center; Columbia, Missouri
Feb 6, 1982	No. 1	Nebraska	L 51–67	19–1 (8–1)	Hearnes Center; Columbia, Missouri
Feb 9, 1982; ESPN	No. 4	at Kansas; Border War	W 42–41	20–1 (9–1)	Allen Fieldhouse; Lawrence, Kansas
Feb 13, 1982	No. 4	at Oklahoma State	W 89–82	21–1 (10–1)	Gallagher-Iba Arena; Stillwater, Oklahoma
Feb 16, 1982	No. 4	Iowa State	W 100–71	22–1 (11–1)	Hearnes Center; Columbia, Missouri
Feb 18, 1982	No. 4	at Oklahoma	W 60–55	23–1 (12–1)	Lloyd Noble Center; Norman, Oklahoma
Feb 20, 1982*; NBC	No. 4	at No. 13 Georgetown	L 51–63	23–2	McDonough Gymnasium; Washington, D.C.
Feb 24, 1982	No. 5	Kansas State	L 56–57	23–3 (12–2)	Hearnes Center; Columbia, Missouri
Big Eight Conference tournament
Mar 2, 1982*	No. 5	Colorado; Big Eight tournament quarterfinal	W 72–60	24–3	Hearnes Center; Columbia, MO
Mar 3, 1982*	No. 5	vs. Nebraska; Big Eight tournament semifinal	W 58–53	25–3	Kemper Arena; Kansas City, MO
Mar 4, 1982*	No. 5	vs. Oklahoma; Big Eight tournament Championship	W 68–63	26–3	Kemper Arena; Kansas City, MO
NCAA tournament
Mar 13, 1982*	(2 MW) No. 5	vs. (7 MW) Marquette; Second Round	W 73–69	27–3	Mabee Center (10,775); Tulsa, OK
Mar 19, 1982*	(2 MW) No. 5	vs. (6 MW) Houston; Regional Semifinal – Sweet Sixteen	L 78–79	27–4	The Checkerdome; St. Louis, MO
*Non-conference game. ^{#}Rankings from AP. (#) Tournament seedings in parentheses. MW=Midwest. All times are in Central.

== Awards ==
- Ricky Frazier – Big Eight Player of the Year
