= 1981–82 Kansas Jayhawks men's basketball team =

American college basketball season

1981–82 Kansas Jayhawks men's basketball
- Conference: Big Eight Conference
- Record: 13–14 (4–10 Big 8)
- Head coach: Ted Owens (18th season)
- Assistant coach: Bob Hill (3rd season)
- Captains: Tony Guy; Dave Magley
- Home arena: Allen Fieldhouse

1981–82 Big Eight Conference men's basketball standings
	Conf.				Overall
Team	W		L	PCT	W		L	PCT
No. 5 Missouri †	12	–	2	.857	27	–	4	.871
Kansas State	10	–	4	.714	23	–	8	.742
Oklahoma	8	–	6	.571	22	–	11	.667
Nebraska	7	–	7	.500	16	–	12	.571
Oklahoma State	7	–	7	.500	15	–	12	.556
Iowa State	5	–	9	.357	10	–	17	.370
Kansas	4	–	10	.286	13	–	14	.481
Colorado	3	–	11	.214	11	–	16	.407
† 1982 Big Eight tournament winner Rankings from AP Poll

The 1981–82 Kansas Jayhawks men's basketball team represented the University of Kansas during the 1981–82 NCAA Division I men's basketball season.

== Roster ==
- Dave Magley
- Tony Guy
- Kelly Knight
- Jeff Dishman
- Tyke Peacock
- Lance Hill
- Brian Martin
- Tad Boyle
- Mark Summers
- Mark Ewing
- Tim Banks
- Ron McHenry
- J. Jackson

== Schedule ==
Date time, TV	Rank^{#}	Opponent^{#}	Result	Record	Site city, state
November 28*		vs. No. 1 North Carolina	L 67-74	0-1	Charlotte Coliseum; Charlotte, NC
November 30*		Arizona State	W 63-62	1-1	Allen Fieldhouse; Lawrence, KS
December 2*		Texas Southern	W 67-65	2-1	Allen Fieldhouse; Lawrence, KS
December 5*		Michigan State	W 74-56	3-1	Allen Fieldhouse; Lawrence, KS
December 7*		Arizona	W 86-57	4-1	Allen Fieldhouse; Lawrence, KS
December 12*		No. 2 Kentucky	L 74-77 ^{OT}	4-2	Allen Fieldhouse; Lawrence, KS
December 19*		No. 3 SMU	W 81-71	5-2	Allen Fieldhouse; Lawrence, KS
December 28*		vs. St. John's (NY); ECAC Holiday Festival Semifinal	L 75-76	5-3	Madison Square Garden; New York, NY
December 29*		vs. No. 11 Indiana	W 71-61	6-3	Madison Square Garden; New York, NY
January 6*		Evansville	W 72-65	7-3	Allen Fieldhouse; Lawrence, KS
January 9*		Rollins	W 82-69	8-3	Allen Fieldhouse; Lawrence, KS
January 13		at Nebraska	L 55-75	8-4 (0-1)	Bob Devaney Sports Center; Lincoln, NE
January 16		Oklahoma State	W 77-72	9-4 (1-1)	Allen Fieldhouse; Lawrence, KS
January 20		at No. 2 Missouri; Border War	L 35-41	9-5 (1-2)	Hearnes Center; Columbia, MO
January 23		at No. 18 Kansas State; Sunflower Showdown	L 53-70	9-6 (1-3)	Ahearn Field House; Manhattan, KS
January 25*		Alcorn State	W 72-60	10-6	Allen Fieldhouse; Lawrence, KS
January 27		Colorado	W 74-60	11-6 (2-3)	Allen Fieldhouse; Lawrence, KS
January 30		Oklahoma	W 55-53	12-6 (3-3)	Allen Fieldhouse; Lawrence, KS
February 3		at Iowa State	L 53-55	12-7 (3-4)	James H. Hilton Coliseum (6,781); Ames, IA
February 6		at Oklahoma State	L 64-79	12-8 (3-5)	Gallagher-Iba Arena; Stillwater, OK
February 9		No. 4 Missouri; Border War	L 41-42	12-9 (3-6)	Allen Fieldhouse; Lawrence, KS
February 13		Nebraska	W 66-63	13-9 (4-6)	Allen Fieldhouse; Lawrence, KS
February 17		at Colorado	L 80-89	13-10 (4-7)	Coors Events/Conference Center; Boulder, CO
February 20		No. 18 Kansas State; Sunflower Showdown	L 53-63	13-11 (4-8)	Allen Fieldhouse; Lawrence, KS
February 24		at Oklahoma	L 76-79	13-12 (4-9)	Lloyd Noble Center; Norman, OK
February 27		Iowa State	L 61-63	13-13 (4-10)	Allen Fieldhouse (5,600); Lawrence, KS
March 2		at No. 17 Kansas State; Big Eight Conference men's basketball tournament quarterfinals Sunflower Showdown	L 62-74	13-14	Ahearn Field House; Manhattan, KS
*Non-conference game. ^{#}Rankings from AP Poll. (#) Tournament seedings in parentheses.
