= 1981–82 Drake Bulldogs men's basketball team =

American college basketball season

1981–82 Drake Bulldogs men's basketball
- Conference: Missouri Valley Conference
- Record: 12–15 (7–9 MVC)
- Head coach: Gary Garner (1st season)
- Home arena: Veterans Memorial Auditorium

1981–82 Missouri Valley Conference men's basketball standings
	Conf.				Overall
Team	W		L	PCT	W		L	PCT
Bradley	13	–	3	.813	26	–	10	.722
No. 10 Tulsa †	12	–	4	.750	24	–	6	.800
Wichita State	12	–	4	.750	23	–	6	.793
New Mexico State	10	–	6	.625	17	–	11	.607
Illinois State	9	–	7	.563	17	–	12	.586
Drake	7	–	9	.438	12	–	15	.444
Southern Illinois	7	–	9	.438	11	–	16	.407
Creighton	4	–	12	.250	7	–	20	.259
Indiana State	3	–	13	.188	9	–	18	.333
West Texas State	3	–	13	.188	11	–	15	.423
† 1982 MVC tournament winner Rankings from AP Poll

The 1981–82 Drake Bulldogs basketball team represented Drake University in the 1981–82 college basketball season.

== Roster ==
1981–82 Drake Bulldogs men's basketball team
Players
Coaches

Pos.	#	Name	Height	Weight	Year	Previous school	Hometown
G	12	Stephfon Butler	6 ft 1 in (1.85 m)	170 lb (77 kg)	So	DuSable	Chicago, Illinois
F	44	Kevin Campbell (redshirt)	6 ft 7 in (2.01 m)	185 lb (84 kg)	RS Jr	De Soto	De Soto, Kansas
G	21	Dana Dunson	6 ft 3 in (1.91 m)	186 lb (84 kg)	Jr	Bloomington	Bloomington, Illinois
C	23	Donnie Earl	6 ft 6 in (1.98 m)	180 lb (82 kg)	Sr	Northern Nash	Rocky Mount, North Carolina
C	42	John Everding	6 ft 8 in (2.03 m)	200 lb (91 kg)	Fr	Nicolet	Milwaukee, Wisconsin
C	41	George Johnson	6 ft 8 in (2.03 m)	205 lb (93 kg)	Fr	Blake	Minneapolis, Minnesota
F	20	Devi Parks	6 ft 5 in (1.96 m)	195 lb (88 kg)	Jr	Garey	Pomona, California
F	40	Leon Van Hook	6 ft 6 in (1.98 m)	200 lb (91 kg)	So	Morgan Park	Chicago, Illinois
F	45	Ricky Watley	6 ft 5 in (1.96 m)	205 lb (93 kg)	Jr	West Germany
C	31	Tony Watson	6 ft 6 in (1.98 m)	196 lb (89 kg)	Sr	Taft	Bronx, New York
G	15	Terry Youngbauer	6 ft 1 in (1.85 m)	170 lb (77 kg)	Jr	Hamilton	Sussex, Wisconsin

Head coach

- Gary Garner

Assistant coach(es)

Legend

- (C) Team captain
- (S) Suspended
- (I) Ineligible
- (W) Walk-on
- Injured
- Current redshirt

Roster

== Schedule ==
Date time, TV	Rank^{#}	Opponent^{#}	Result	Record	Site city, state
December 1*		Lewis	L 40–41	0–1	Veterans Memorial Auditorium; Des Moines, Iowa
December 3*		Chicago State	W 89–65	1–1	Veterans Memorial Auditorium; Des Moines, Iowa
December 5*		Texas	L 51–58	1–2	Veterans Memorial Auditorium; Des Moines, Iowa
December 8*		at No. 8 Minnesota	L 55–80	1–3	Williams Arena; Minneapolis, Minnesota
December 12*		Air Force	W 65–46	2–3	Veterans Memorial Auditorium; Des Moines, Iowa
December 17*		Missouri-K.C.	W 68–54	3–3	Veterans Memorial Auditorium; Des Moines, Iowa
December 19*; 7:35 p.m., Heritage Cablevision		Iowa State	W 72–56	4–3	Veterans Memorial Auditorium (10,015); Des Moines, Iowa
December 22*		at Texas	L 56–82	4–4	Frank Erwin Center; Austin, Texas
December 26*		Northern Iowa	W 62–58	5–4	Veterans Memorial Auditorium; Des Moines, Iowa
December 30*		at No. 10 Iowa; Rivalry	L 49–60	5–5	Iowa Field House; Iowa City, Iowa
January 4		at Illinois State	L 49–59	5–6 (0–1)	Horton Field House (6,245); Normal, Illinois
January 9		Southern Illinois	W 63–55	6–6 (1–1)	Veterans Memorial Auditorium; Des Moines, Iowa
January 14		at No. 18 Tulsa	L 54–71	6–7 (1–2)	Tulsa Convention Center (8,764); Tulsa, Oklahoma
January 21		Bradley	W 61–49	7–7 (2–2)	Veterans Memorial Auditorium; Des Moines, Iowa
January 23		Illinois State	W 49–46	8–7 (3–2)	Veterans Memorial Auditorium (8,860); Des Moines, Iowa
January 28		at Wichita State	L 49–75	8–8 (3–3)	Charles Koch Arena; Wichita, Kansas
January 30		Creighton	W 62–52	9–8 (4–3)	Veterans Memorial Auditorium; Des Moines, Iowa
February 4		Indiana State	W 65–48	10–8 (5–3)	Veterans Memorial Auditorium; Des Moines, Iowa
February 6		at West Texas State	L 50–55	10–9 (5–4)	Canyon, Texas
February 8		at New Mexico State	L 61–64	10–10 (5–5)	Pan American Center; Las Cruces, New Mexico
February 13		Wichita State	L 43–62	10–11 (5–6)	Veterans Memorial Auditorium; Des Moines, Iowa
February 15		No. 7 Tulsa	W 56–55	11–11 (6–6)	Veterans Memorial Auditorium (7,790); Des Moines, Iowa
February 18		at Creighton	W 67–56	12–11 (7–6)	Omaha Civic Auditorium; Omaha, Nebraska
February 23		New Mexico State	L 55–68	12–12 (7–7)	Veterans Memorial Auditorium; Des Moines, Iowa
February 25		at Indiana State	L 61–69	12–13 (7–8)	Hulman Center; Terre Haute, Indiana
February 27		at Southern Illinois	L 64–67	12–14 (7–9)	Banterra Center; Carbondale, Illinois
March 2	(5)	at (4) Illinois State; MVC Quarterfinals	L 43–56	12–15 (7–9)	Banterra Center (4,377); Carbondale, Illinois
*Non-conference game. ^{#}Rankings from AP Poll. (#) Tournament seedings in parentheses. All times are in Central Time.
