= 1981–82 Michigan Wolverines men's basketball team =

American college basketball season

1981–82 Michigan Wolverines men's basketball
- Conference: Big Ten Conference
- Record: 7-20 (7–11 Big Ten)
- Head coach: Bill Frieder
- Assistant coaches: Mike Boyd; Don Sicko; Bud VanDeWege
- MVP: Dion Harris

1981–82 Big Ten Conference men's basketball standings
	Conf.				Overall
Team	W		L	PCT	W		L	PCT
No. 7 Minnesota	14	–	4	.778	23	–	6	.793
No. 16 Iowa	12	–	6	.667	21	–	8	.724
Ohio State	12	–	6	.667	21	–	10	.677
Indiana	12	–	6	.667	19	–	10	.655
Purdue	11	–	7	.611	18	–	14	.563
Illinois	10	–	8	.556	18	–	11	.621
Michigan State	6	–	12	.333	11	–	17	.393
Michigan	6	–	12	.333	7	–	20	.259
Northwestern	4	–	14	.222	8	–	19	.296
Wisconsin*	1	–	17	.056	4	–	23	.148
Rankings from AP Poll; *Wisconsin forfeited all games after Jan 25, 1982 due to NCAA sanctions. Disputed record (3–15, 6–23)

The 1981–82 Michigan Wolverines men's basketball team represented the University of Michigan in intercollegiate college basketball during the 1981–82 season. The team played its home games in the Crisler Arena in Ann Arbor, Michigan, and was a member of the Big Ten Conference. Under the direction of head coach Bill Frieder, the team finished tied for seventh in the Big Ten Conference. The team failed to earn an invitation to either the 1982 National Invitation Tournament or the 1982 NCAA Men's Division I Basketball Tournament. The team was unranked for all eighteen weeks of Associated Press Top Twenty-Five Poll, and it also ended the season unranked in the final USA Today/CNN Poll.

== Team players drafted into the NBA ==
Five players from this team were selected in the NBA draft. McCormick accumulated no statistics for the season.

Year	Round	Pick	Overall	Player	NBA Club
1982	7	3	141	Thad Gardner	Utah Jazz
1983	10	7	213	Ike Person	Detroit Pistons
1984	1	12	12	Tim McCormick	Cleveland Cavaliers
1984	2	8	32	Eric Turner	Detroit Pistons
1984	10	19	225	Dan Pelekoudas	Detroit Pistons
