= 1983 Missouri Valley Conference men's basketball tournament =

- Classification: Division I
- Season: 1982–83
- Teams: 8
- Site: Campus sites
- Finals site: Horton Field House; Normal, Illinois
- Champions: Illinois State (1st title)
- Winning coach: Bob Donewald (1st title)

1982–83 Missouri Valley Conference men's basketball standings
| | Conf. | | | | Overall |
| Team | W | | L | PCT | W | | L | PCT |
|---|---|---|---|---|---|---|---|---|
| No. 14 Wichita State | 17 | – | 1 | .944 | 25 | – | 3 | .893 |
| Illinois State † | 13 | – | 5 | .722 | 24 | – | 7 | .774 |
| New Mexico State | 11 | – | 7 | .611 | 18 | – | 11 | .621 |
| Tulsa | 11 | – | 7 | .611 | 19 | – | 12 | .613 |
| Bradley | 10 | – | 8 | .556 | 16 | – | 13 | .552 |
| Drake | 9 | – | 9 | .500 | 13 | – | 15 | .464 |
| Indiana State | 5 | – | 13 | .278 | 9 | – | 19 | .321 |
| West Texas State | 5 | – | 13 | .278 | 8 | – | 20 | .286 |
| Southern Illinois | 5 | – | 13 | .278 | 9 | – | 19 | .321 |
| Creighton | 4 | – | 14 | .222 | 8 | – | 19 | .296 |
† 1983 MVC tournament winner Rankings from AP Poll

The 1983 Missouri Valley Conference men's basketball tournament was after the conclusion of the 1982–1983 regular season. The quarterfinal and semifinal rounds were played on campus sites, with the final contested at Horton Field House on the campus of Illinois State University in Normal, Illinois.

The Illinois State Redbirds defeated the Tulsa Golden Hurricane in the championship game, 84–64, and as a result won their first MVC Tournament title and earned an automatic bid to the 1983 NCAA tournament.

== Bracket ==
Quarterfinals; March 10, 1983; Campus Sites
1 | Illinois State | 84
8 | Southern Illinois | 54
4 | Bradley | 63
5 | Drake | 53
2 | New Mexico State | 95
7 | West Texas State | 80
3 | Tulsa | 108
6 | Indiana State | 89

Semifinals; March 11, 1983; Campus Sites
1 | Illinois State | 79
4 | Bradley | 61
2 | New Mexico State | 48
3 | Tulsa | 49

Final; March 12, 1983; Horton Field House
1 | Illinois State | 84
3 | Tulsa | 64
