= Sun Belt Conference men's basketball tournament =

Men's college basketball tournament

- Conference basketball championship
- Sport: College basketball
- Conference: Sun Belt Conference
- Number of teams: 14
- Format: Single-elimination tournament
- Current stadium: Pensacola Bay Center
- Current location: Pensacola, FL
- Played: 1977–present
- Last contest: 2025
- Current champion: Troy
- Most championships: Western Kentucky (9)
- TV partner(s): ESPN+, ESPN
- Official website: Sun Belt Men's Basketball

Host stadiums
- Charlotte Coliseum; Jacksonville Memorial Coliseum; Birmingham Jefferson Convention Complex; Hampton Coliseum; E.A. Diddle Arena; Richmond Coliseum; Mobile Civic Center; Mississippi Coast Coliseum; Barton Coliseum; Cajundome; Mitchell Center; Alltel Arena; Lakefront Arena; UNT Coliseum; Murphy Center; Summit Arena; Hartsell Arena; Pensacola Bay Center

Host locations
- Charlotte, NC (1977–1980, 1989); Jacksonville, FL (1981); Birmingham, AL (1982–1984,1986,1990); Hampton, VA (1985); Bowling Green, KY (1987, 1994, 2003–2004); Richmond, VA (1988); Mobile, AL (1991, 2001, 2008); Biloxi, MS (1992–1993); Little Rock, AR (1995–1997); Lafayette, LA (1998–1999, 2007); North Little Rock, AR (2000); New Orleans, LA (2002, 2014–2019); Denton, TX (2005); Murfreesboro, TN (2006); Hot Springs, AR (2009–2013); Pensacola, FL (2021–present)

The Sun Belt Conference men's basketball tournament has been played every year since the formation of the Sun Belt Conference prior to the 1976–77 American collegiate academic year. The winner of the tournament is guaranteed an automatic berth into the NCAA Division I men's basketball tournament.

== History ==
=== Format ===
The size and format of the Sun Belt tournament has varied widely since its establishment in 1976. The size of the conference has ranged between a minimum of six teams and as many as thirteen.

Nonetheless, the tournament has consistently utilized a simple single-elimination style tournament. Through the 2018 edition of the tournament, with a few exceptions, all conference members were typically invited to each tournament. Depending on the total number of teams in the league during a particular year, higher-seeded teams have sometimes received byes into the quarterfinal or semifinal rounds. Teams have always been seeded based on regular season conference records, although some modifications were made when the league was split into divisions during the 2000s.

During the 2018 offseason, the conference announced radical changes to its basketball scheduling and tournament format. A year later, many of these changes were reevaluated and placed on hold; the ones listed here remained in place.

- Effective with the 2019 edition forward, only 10 of the conference's 12 teams qualified for the tournament.
- The format consisted of two stepladder-style brackets. The bottom four seeds played in the first round; the 5 and 6 seeds received byes into the second round; the 3 and 4 seeds began play in the quarterfinals, and the top two seeds received a triple bye into the semifinals.
- In 2019, the bottom four seeds played first-round games at campus sites, hosted by the higher seed. The winners then joined the top six teams at Lakefront Arena.
- Starting in 2020, all games prior to the semifinals will be at campus sites, again hosted by the higher seeds. The semifinals and finals remained in New Orleans, but moved to the Smoothie King Center.

On March 3, 2020, the conference announced that it had reached an agreement for Pensacola, Florida to host the men's and women's tournaments from 2021 to 2025. During that time, the tournament will completely abandon the use of campus sites and return to a format that features all conference members. First- and second-round games will be played simultaneously at Hartsell Arena on the campus of Pensacola State College and the Pensacola Bay Center, with semifinals and finals at the Bay Center.

=== Hosts ===
With some exceptions, the tournament has historically been played at the home gym of one of the conference's members (e.g. Louisiana's Cajundome, North Texas' UNT Coliseum) or at a major arena in a nearby city (e.g. Mobile Civic Center near South Alabama).

Some of the more common host venues have included the Charlotte Coliseum in Charlotte, North Carolina (Charlotte), the venue now known as Legacy Arena in Birmingham, Alabama (UAB), Barton Coliseum in Little Rock, Arkansas (Little Rock), and E.A. Diddle Arena in Bowling Green, Kentucky (Western Kentucky).

However, the tournament has been hosted at a neutral arena site each year since 2009 (Hot Springs, Arkansas, New Orleans, Louisiana, and Pensacola, Florida). Lakefront Arena in New Orleans had previously hosted the event in 2002 when UNO was still a Sun Belt member, but the Privateers have since departed the conference. The only other neutral sites to host a Sun Belt tournament were the Hampton Coliseum in Hampton, Virginia (1985) and the Mississippi Coast Coliseum in Biloxi, Mississippi (1992–1993).

=== NCAA performances ===
The Sun Belt has a storied basketball history, sending multiple teams into the NCAA tournament in the 1980s and 1990s (most recently 1994), and then again in 2008 when both regular season champion South Alabama, and tournament winner Western Kentucky received bids, and in 2013 with Western Kentucky and Middle Tennessee.

Charlotte, then known athletically as UNC Charlotte, reached the Final Four in 1977, and future Sun Belt member Western Kentucky reached the Final Four in 1971. Overall, past and present Sun Belt schools have posted 21 wins in the NCAA Tournament during the time they were conference members.

== Champions by year ==
Year	Champion	Score	Runner-up	Tournament MVP	Location
1977	UNC Charlotte	71–70	New Orleans	Cedric Maxwell, UNC Charlotte	Campus Sites – First Round; Charlotte Coliseum (Charlotte, NC) – Finals
1978	New Orleans	22–20	South Alabama	Nate Mills, New Orleans	Campus Sites – First Round; Charlotte Coliseum (Charlotte, NC) – Finals
1979	Jacksonville	68–54	South Florida	James Ray, Jacksonville	Campus Sites – First Round; Charlotte Coliseum (Charlotte, NC) – Finals
1980	VCU	105–88	UAB	Ed Sherod, VCU	Campus Sites – First Round; Charlotte Coliseum (Charlotte, NC) – Finals
1981	VCU	62–61 ^{OT}	UAB	Kenny Stancil, VCU	Jacksonville Memorial Coliseum (Jacksonville, FL)
1982	UAB	94–83	VCU	Oliver Robinson, UAB	BJCC Coliseum (Birmingham, AL)
1983	UAB	64–47	South Florida	Cliff Pruitt, UAB	BJCC Coliseum (Birmingham, AL)
1984	UAB	62–60	Old Dominion	McKinley Singleton, UAB	BJCC Coliseum (Birmingham, AL)
1985	VCU	87–82	Old Dominion	Mike Schlegel, VCU	Hampton Coliseum (Hampton, VA)
1986	Jacksonville	70–69	UAB	Otis Smith, Jacksonville	BJCC Coliseum (Birmingham, AL)
1987	UAB	72–60	Western Kentucky	Tracy Foster, UAB	E. A. Diddle Arena (Bowling Green, KY)
1988	UNC Charlotte	81–79	VCU	Byron Dinkins, UNC Charlotte	Richmond Coliseum (Richmond, VA)
1989	South Alabama	105–59	Jacksonville	Jeff Hodge, South Alabama	Charlotte Coliseum (Charlotte, NC)
1990	South Florida	81–74	UNC Charlotte	Radenko Dobraš, South Florida	BJCC Coliseum (Birmingham, AL)
1991	South Alabama	86–81	Old Dominion	Chris Gatling, Old Dominion	Mobile Civic Center (Mobile, AL)
1992	Southwestern Louisiana	75–71	Louisiana Tech	Todd Hill, Southwestern Louisiana	Mississippi Coast Coliseum (Biloxi, MS)
1993	Western Kentucky	72–63	New Orleans	Darnell Mee, Western Kentucky	Mississippi Coast Coliseum (Biloxi, MS)
1994	Southwestern Louisiana	78–72	Western Kentucky	Michael Allen, Southwestern Louisiana	E. A. Diddle Arena (Bowling Green, KY)
1995	Western Kentucky	82–79	Arkansas–Little Rock	Chris Robinson, Western Kentucky	Barton Coliseum (Little Rock, AR)
1996	New Orleans	57–56	Arkansas–Little Rock	Lewis Sims, New Orleans	Barton Coliseum (Little Rock, AR)
1997	South Alabama	44–43	Louisiana Tech	Rusty Yoder, South Alabama	Barton Coliseum (Little Rock, AR)
1998	South Alabama	62–59	Southwestern Louisiana	Toby Madison, South Alabama	Cajundome (Lafayette, LA)
1999	Arkansas State	65–48	Western Kentucky	Chico Fletcher, Arkansas State	Cajundome (Lafayette, LA)
2000	Louisiana–Lafayette	51–50	South Alabama	Virgil Stanescu, South Alabama	Alltel Arena (North Little Rock, AR)
2001	Western Kentucky	64–54	South Alabama	Chris Marcus, Western Kentucky	Mitchell Center (Mobile, AL)
2002	Western Kentucky	76–70	Louisiana–Lafayette	Derek Robinson, Western Kentucky	Lakefront Arena (New Orleans, LA)
2003	Western Kentucky	64–52	Middle Tennessee	Patrick Sparks, Western Kentucky	E. A. Diddle Arena (Bowling Green, KY)
2004	Louisiana–Lafayette Vacated	67–58	New Orleans	Bo McCalebb, New Orleans	E. A. Diddle Arena (Bowling Green, KY)
2005	Louisiana–Lafayette Vacated	88–69	Denver	Tiras Wade, Louisiana-Lafayette	UNT Coliseum (Denton, TX)
2006	South Alabama	95–70	Western Kentucky	Chey Christie, South Alabama	Murphy Center (Murfreesboro, TN)
2007	North Texas	83–75	Arkansas State	Calvin Watson, North Texas	Campus Sites – First Round; Cajundome (Lafayette, LA) – Finals
2008	Western Kentucky	67–57	Middle Tennessee	Jeremy Evans, Western Kentucky	Campus Sites – First Round; Mitchell Center (Mobile, AL) – Finals
2009	Western Kentucky	64–55	South Alabama	A. J. Slaughter, Western Kentucky	Summit Arena (Hot Springs, AR)
2010	North Texas	66–63	Troy	Eric Tramiel, North Texas	Summit Arena (Hot Springs, AR)
2011	Arkansas–Little Rock	64–63	North Texas	Solomon Bozeman, Arkansas-Little Rock	Summit Arena (Hot Springs, AR)
2012	Western Kentucky	74–70	North Texas	George Fant, Western Kentucky	Summit Arena (Hot Springs, AR)
2013	Western Kentucky	65–63	FIU	T. J. Price, Western Kentucky	Summit Arena (Hot Springs, AR)
2014	Louisiana–Lafayette	82–81 ^{OT}	Georgia State	Bryant Mbamalu, Louisiana-Lafayette	Lakefront Arena (New Orleans, LA)
2015	Georgia State	38–36	Georgia Southern	Kevin Ware, Georgia State	Lakefront Arena (New Orleans, LA)
2016	Little Rock	70–50	Louisiana–Monroe	Roger Woods, Little Rock	Lakefront Arena (New Orleans, LA)
2017	Troy	59–53	Texas State	Wesley Person Jr., Troy	Lakefront Arena (New Orleans, LA)
2018	Georgia State	74–61	Texas–Arlington	D'Marcus Simonds, Georgia State	Lakefront Arena (New Orleans, LA)
2019	Georgia State	73–64	Texas–Arlington	Malik Benlevi, Georgia State	Campus Sites – First Round; Lakefront Arena (New Orleans, LA)
2020	Cancelled due to the coronavirus pandemic				
2021	Appalachian State	80–73	Georgia State	Michael Almonacy, Appalachian State	Hartsell Arena – Select first-and second-round games Pensacola Bay Center – All remaining games (Pensacola, FL)
2022	Georgia State	80–71	Louisiana	Corey Allen, Georgia State	Pensacola Bay Center (Pensacola, FL)
2023	Louisiana	71–66	South Alabama	Jordan Brown, Louisiana	Pensacola Bay Center (Pensacola, FL)
2024	James Madison	91–71	Arkansas State	Noah Freidel, James Madison	Pensacola Bay Center (Pensacola, FL)
2025	Troy	94–81	Arkansas State	Tayton Conerway, Troy	Pensacola Bay Center (Pensacola, FL)
2026	Troy	77–61	Georgia Southern	Thomas Dowd, Troy	Pensacola Bay Center (Pensacola, FL)

Notes

- The University of Louisiana at Lafayette was known as Southwestern Louisiana prior to the 1999–2000 season. The school now brands its athletic program solely as Louisiana, with no city identifier.
- The University of Arkansas at Little Rock changed its athletic branding to Little Rock starting with the 2015–16 school year.

== Performance by school ==
School	Championships	Championship Years
Western Kentucky	9	1993, 1995, 2001, 2002, 2003, 2008, 2009, 2012, 2013
**South Alabama**	5	1989, 1991, 1997, 1998, 2006
**Louisiana**	5	1992, 1994, 2000, 2014, 2023
UAB	4	1982, 1983, 1984, 1987
**Georgia State**	4	2015, 2018, 2019, 2022
VCU	3	1980, 1981, 1985
**Troy**	3	2017, 2025, 2026
Charlotte	2	1977, 1988
Jacksonville	2	1979, 1986
New Orleans	2	1978, 1996
North Texas	2	2007, 2010
Little Rock	2	2011, 2016
**Appalachian State**	1	2021
**Arkansas State**	1	1999
**James Madison**	1	2024
South Florida	1	1990

- Teams in **bold** represent current Sun Belt Conference members.

Teams currently in Sun Belt with no championships: Coastal Carolina, Georgia Southern, Louisiana-Monroe, Marshall, Old Dominion, Southern Miss, Texas State

== Broadcasters ==
=== Television ===
Year	Network	Play-by-play	Analyst
2024	ESPN	Mike Morgan	Mark Wise
2023	ESPN2	Mike Morgan	Mark Wise
2022	ESPN2	Mike Morgan	Mark Wise
2021	ESPN2	Doug Sherman	Tim Welsh
2020	ESPN2	Kevin Fitzgerald	Dane Bradshaw
2019	ESPN2	Rich Hollenberg	Chris Spatola
2018	ESPN2	Mitch Holthus	Mark Adams
2017	ESPN2	Rich Hollenberg	Mark Adams
2016	ESPN2	Rich Hollenberg	Mark Adams
2015	ESPN2	Rich Hollenberg	Mark Adams
2014	ESPN2	Rich Hollenberg	Mark Adams
2013	ESPN	Mark Jones	Mark Adams
2012	ESPN2	Adam Amin	Mark Adams
2011	ESPN2	Rob Stone	Mark Adams
2010	ESPN2	Ron Franklin	Mark Adams
2009	ESPN2	Dave Pasch	Bob Valvano
2008	ESPN2		
2007	ESPN2	Dave Barnett	Jimmy Dykes

=== Radio ===
Year	Network	Play-by-play	Analyst
2017	TAG Sports Group	T. J. Rives	Dineaux Hanson
2016	College Sports Now	T. J. Rives	Mark Wise
2015	College Sports Now	T. J. Rives	Mark Wise
2012	Westwood One	Brad Sham	Bill Frieder
2011	Westwood One	Brad Sham	Dave Odom
2010	Westwood One	Brad Sham	Dave Odom

== See also ==
Sun Belt Conference women's basketball tournament
