= 1985–86 Western Kentucky Hilltoppers basketball team =

American college basketball season

1985–86 Western Kentucky Hilltoppers basketball

Wendy's Classic Champion

NCAA Tournament, Second Round
- Conference: Sun Belt Conference
- Record: 23–8 (10–4 Sun Belt)
- Head coach: Clem Haskins
- Assistant coach: David Farrar
- Home arena: E. A. Diddle Arena

1985–86 Sun Belt Conference men's basketball standings
	Conf.				Overall
Team	W		L	PCT	W		L	PCT
Old Dominion	11	–	3	.786	23	–	8	.742
Western Kentucky	10	–	4	.714	23	–	8	.742
UAB	9	–	5	.643	25	–	11	.694
Jacksonville †	9	–	5	.643	21	–	10	.677
VCU	6	–	8	.429	12	–	16	.429
South Alabama	5	–	9	.357	16	–	16	.500
South Florida	5	–	9	.357	14	–	14	.500
UNC Charlotte	1	–	13	.071	8	–	20	.286
† 1986 Sun Belt Conference tournament winner Rankings from AP Poll

The 1985–86 Western Kentucky Hilltoppers men's basketball team represented Western Kentucky University during the 1985–86 NCAA Division I men's basketball season. The Hilltoppers were led by Sun Belt Conference Coach of the Year Clem Haskins, in his final year at the helm. WKU finished second in the conference and received a bid to the 1986 NCAA Division I men's basketball tournament. This team's roster featured three future NBA players Tellis Frank, Kannard Johnson, and Clarence Martin. Billy Gordon, Johnson, and Martin were selected to the All-Conference Team, while Ray Swogger made the SBC All-Tournament Team.

== Schedule ==
Date time, TV	Rank^{#}	Opponent^{#}	Result	Record	Site city, state
Regular Season
11/23/1985*		Samford	W 80–47	1–0	E. A. Diddle Arena; Bowling Green, KY
11/27/1985*		Cincinnati	W 69–58	2–0	E. A. Diddle Arena; Bowling Green, KY
12/2/1985*		Southern Illinois	W 77–67	3–0	E. A. Diddle Arena; Bowling Green, KY
12/6/1985*		Chaminade; Wendy’s Classic	W 101–75	4–0	E. A. Diddle Arena; Bowling Green, KY
12/7/1985*		No. 19 Auburn; Wendy’s Classic	W 71–58	5–0	E. A. Diddle Arena; Bowling Green, KY
12/9/1985*		Middle Tennessee	W 86–74	6–0	E. A. Diddle Arena; Bowling Green, KY
11/29/1986*		Columbus College	W 87–61	7–0	E. A. Diddle Arena; Bowling Green, KY
12/14/1985*		at No. 15 Louisville	L 70–73	7–1	Freedom Hall; Louisville, KY
12/21/1985*		at Morehead State	W 75–68	8–1	Ellis Johnson Arena; Morehead, KY
12/28/1985		ODU	L 59–62	8–2 (0-1)	E. A. Diddle Arena; Bowling Green, KY
1/4/1986*		at No. 20 Virginia Tech	L 71–85	8–3	Cassell Coliseum; Blacksburg, VA
1/6/1986*		Murray State	W 80–58	9–3	E. A. Diddle Arena; Bowling Green, KY
1/11/1986		at South Florida	W 57–45	10–3 (1-1)	USF Sun Dome; Tampa, FL
1/13/1986*		at Tennessee State	W 69–58	11–3	Gentry Complex; Nashville, TN
1/16/1986		at No. 12 UAB	W 75–72 ^{OT}	12–3 (2-1)	Birmingham–Jefferson Convention Complex; Birmingham, AL
1/20/1986		VCU	W 62–60	13–3 (3-1)	E. A. Diddle Arena; Bowling Green, KY
1/22/1986*		Dayton	W 64–62	14–3	E. A. Diddle Arena; Bowling Green, KY
1/25/1986		No. 18 UAB	W 81–75	15–3 (4-1)	E. A. Diddle Arena; Bowling Green, KY
1/30/1986		at UNCC	W 78–67	16–3 (5-1)	Belk Gymnasium; Charlotte, NC
2/1/1986		South Alabama	W 68–52	17–3 (6-1)	E. A. Diddle Arena; Bowling Green, KY
2/3/1986		Jacksonville	W 51–46	18–3 (7-1)	E. A. Diddle Arena; Bowling Green, KY
2/6/1986	No. 19	at ODU	L 61–74	18–4 (7-2)	Norfolk Scope; Norfolk, VA
2/8/1986	No. 19	UNCC	W 78–68	19–4 (8-2)	E. A. Diddle Arena; Bowling Green, KY
2/10/1986	No. 19	at Jacksonville	L 65–70	19–5 (8-3)	Swisher Gymnasium; Jacksonville, FL
2/13/1986		South Florida	W 77–57	20–5 (9-3)	E. A. Diddle Arena; Bowling Green, KY
2/17/1986		at South Alabama	W 53–51	21–5 (10-3)	Mitchell Center; Mobile, AL
2/22/1986		at VCU	L 56–60	21–6 (10-4)	Richmond Coliseum; Richmond, VA
1986 Sun Belt Conference men's basketball tournament
2/27/1986	(2)	vs. (7) South Florida; Quarterfinals	W 57–46	22–6	Birmingham–Jefferson Convention Complex; Birmingham, AL
2/28/1986	(2)	at (3) UAB; Semifinals	L 45–57	22–7	Birmingham–Jefferson Convention Complex; Birmingham, AL
1986 NCAA Division I men's basketball tournament
3/14/1986*	(8 SE)	vs. (9 SE) Nebraska; First Round	W 67–59	23–7	Charlotte Coliseum; Charlotte, NC
3/16/1986*	(8 SE)	vs. (1 SE) No. 3 Kentucky; Second Round	L 64–71	23–8	Charlotte Coliseum; Charlotte, NC
*Non-conference game. ^{#}Rankings from AP Poll (S#) during Tournament is seed. (#) Tournament seedings in parentheses.

== Awards and honors ==
- Clem Haskins – Sun Belt co-Coach of the Year
