= VCU Rams men's basketball, 1979–1991 =

The VCU Rams men's basketball team represents Virginia Commonwealth University in National Collegiate Athletic Association Division I men's basketball competitions. This article is a list of results and statistics of the men's basketball team from the 1979–80 season to the 1990–91 season during which the team played in the Sun Belt Conference.

Contents:	1979–80 – 1980–81 – 1981–82 – 1982–83 – 1983–84 – 1984–85 – 1985–86 – 1986–87 – 1987–88 – 1988–89 – 1989–90 – 1990–91 – NBA Draft selections – References

== 1979–80 ==
1979–80 Sun Belt Conference men's basketball standings
	Conf.				Overall
Team	W		L	PCT	W		L	PCT
South Alabama	12	–	2	.857	23	–	6	.793
UAB	10	–	4	.714	18	–	12	.600
Jacksonville	10	–	4	.714	20	–	9	.690
UNC Charlotte	9	–	5	.643	15	–	12	.556
VCU †	8	–	6	.571	18	–	12	.600
Georgia State	4	–	10	.286	6	–	21	.222
New Orleans	2	–	12	.143	5	–	21	.192
South Florida	1	–	13	.071	6	–	21	.222
† 1980 Sun Belt Conference tournament winner Rankings from AP Poll

Date	Opponent^{#}	Rank^{#}	Site	Result	Record
Non-Conference Regular Season
11/30/79	vs East Carolina		Robins Center • Richmond, Virginia (Spider Classic)	W 74-64	1-0
12/01/79	at Richmond		Robins Center • Richmond, Virginia (Spider Classic)	W 69-67	2-0
Sun Belt Conference Regular Season
12/06/79	Jacksonville		Richmond Coliseum • Richmond, Virginia	L 63-65	2-1 (0-1)
12/08/79	at William & Mary		Kaplan Arena • Williamsburg, Virginia	W 57-54	3-1
12/13/79	at Georgia State		GSU Sports Arena • Atlanta	W 89-62	4-1 (1-1)
12/17/79	South Alabama		Richmond Coliseum • Richmond, Virginia	L 56-60	4-2 (1-2)
12/20/79	James Madison		Richmond Coliseum • Richmond, Virginia	W 70-59	5-2
12/28/79	vs. #14 Virginia		Richmond Coliseum • Richmond, Virginia (Times–Dispatch Invitational)	L 72-89	5-3
12/29/79	vs. Richmond		Richmond Coliseum • Richmond, Virginia (Times–Dispatch Invitational)	W 86-71	6-3
01/02/80	Charlotte		Richmond Coliseum • Richmond, Virginia	W 75-73	7-3 (2-2)
01/05/80	at South Alabama		Jag Gym • Mobile, Alabama	W 87-74	8-3 (3-2)
01/07/80	at UAB		Birmingham–Jefferson Civic Center • Birmingham, Alabama	L 71-82	8-4 (3-3)
01/09/80	Navy		Richmond Coliseum • Richmond, Virginia	W 87-67	9-4
01/12/80	at James Madison		James Madison Convocation Center • Harrisonburg, Virginia	L 51-53^{OT}	9-5
01/16/80	at Jacksonville		Jacksonville Coliseum • Jacksonville, Florida	L 61-74	9-6 (3-4)
01/20/80	Georgia State		Richmond Coliseum • Richmond, Virginia	L 71-77	9-7 (3-5)
01/22/80	Old Dominion		Richmond Coliseum • Richmond, Virginia	L 64-68	9-8
01/24/80	at New Orleans		New Orleans	W 83-71	10-8 (4-5)
01/26/80	at South Florida		Tampa, Florida	W 90-81	11-8 (5-5)
02/02/80	at Old Dominion		ODU Fieldhouse • Norfolk, Virginia	L 75-76	11-9
02/04/80	New Orleans		Richmond Coliseum • Richmond, Virginia	W 72-64	12-9 (6-5)
02/07/80	South Florida		Richmond Coliseum • Richmond, Virginia	W 105-78	13-9 (7-5)
02/10/80	UAB		Richmond Coliseum • Richmond, Virginia	W 90-75	14-9 (8-5)
02/12/80	William & Mary		Richmond Coliseum • Richmond, Virginia	W 64-56	15-9
02/16/80	at Charlotte		Belk Gymnasium • Charlotte, North Carolina	L 74-75	15-10 (8-6)
02/20/80	at Richmond		Robins Center • Richmond, Virginia	L 67-76	15-11
1980 Sun Belt tournament
02/23/80	vs. Charlotte		Charlotte Coliseum • Charlotte, North Carolina (quarterfinals)	W 100-93	16-11
02/24/80	vs. South Alabama		Charlotte Coliseum • Charlotte, North Carolina (semifinals)	W 74-72	17-11
02/25/80	vs. UAB		Charlotte Coliseum • Charlotte, North Carolina (semifinals)	W 105-58	18-11
1980 NCAA tournament
03/06/80	vs. (E 5) Iowa	(E 12)	Greensboro Coliseum • Greensboro, North Carolina (first round)	L 72-86	18-12

== 1980–81 ==
1980–81 Sun Belt Conference men's basketball standings
	Conf.				Overall
Team	W		L	PCT	W		L	PCT
VCU †	9	–	3	.750	24	–	5	.828
South Alabama	9	–	3	.750	25	–	6	.806
UAB	9	–	3	.750	23	–	9	.719
South Florida	7	–	5	.583	18	–	11	.621
Jacksonville	4	–	8	.333	8	–	19	.296
UNC Charlotte	3	–	9	.250	10	–	17	.370
Georgia State	1	–	11	.083	4	–	23	.148
† 1981 Sun Belt Conference tournament winner Rankings from AP Poll

Date	Opponent^{#}	Rank^{#}	Site	Result	Record
Non-Conference Regular Season
11/28/80	vs. Lafayette		University Hall • Charlottesville, Virginia (Cavalier Invitational)	W 44-40	1–0
11/29/80	vs. #8 Virginia		University Hall • Charlottesville, Virginia (Cavalier Invitational)	L 62-77	1-1
12/03/80	William & Mary		Richmond Coliseum • Richmond, Virginia	W 77-58	2-1
12/09/80	Richmond		Richmond Coliseum • Richmond, Virginia	W 88-76	3–1
12/13/80	at Old Dominion		ODU Fieldhouse • Norfolk, Virginia	W 65-56	4-1
Sun Belt Conference Regular Season
12/20/80	Georgia State		Richmond Coliseum • Richmond, Virginia	W 81-69	5-1 (1-0)
12/22/80	Cincinnati		Richmond Coliseum • Richmond, Virginia	W 78-58	6-1
12/29/80	vs. Virginia Tech		Richmond Coliseum • Richmond, Virginia (Times–Dispatch Invitational)	W 57-51	7-1
12/30/80	vs. Old Dominion		Richmond Coliseum • Richmond, Virginia (Times–Dispatch Invitational)	W 61-44	8-1
01/06/81	#15 South Alabama		Richmond Coliseum • Richmond, Virginia	L 62-76	8-2 (1-1)
01/10/81	at UAB		Birmingham–Jefferson Civic Center • Birmingham, Alabama	L 65-67	8-3 (1-2)
01/12/81	at South Florida		USF Sun Dome • Tampa, Florida	L 68-73	8-4 (1-3)
01/18/81	Charlotte		Richmond Coliseum • Richmond, Virginia	W 86-75	9-4 (2-3)
01/20/81	at Georgia State		GSU Sports Arena • Atlanta	W 84-71	10-4 (3-3)
01/22/81	at #11 South Alabama		Jag Gym • Mobile, Alabama	W 86-70	11-4 (4-3)
01/26/81	James Madison		Richmond Coliseum • Richmond, Virginia	W 50-49	12-4
01/29/81	Jacksonville		Richmond Coliseum • Richmond, Virginia	W 62-42	13-4 (5-3)
01/31/81	at Richmond		Robins Center • Richmond, Virginia	W 66-55	14-4
02/03/81	at Charlotte		Belk Gymnasium • Charlotte, North Carolina	W 90-80	15-4 (6-3)
02/10/81	Old Dominion		Richmond Coliseum • Richmond, Virginia	W 75-64	16-4
02/12/81	at James Madison		James Madison Convocation Center • Harrisonburg, Virginia	W 58-57	17-4
02/15/81	UAB		Richmond Coliseum • Richmond, Virginia	W 79-69	18-4 (7-3)
02/17/81	South Florida		Richmond Coliseum • Richmond, Virginia	W 70-64^{OT}	19-4 (8-3)
02/22/81	at Jacksonville		Jacksonville Coliseum • Jacksonville, Florida	W 59-51	20-4 (9-3)
02/24/81	at William & Mary		Kaplan Arena • Williamsburg, Virginia	W 68-67^{OT}	21-4
1981 Sun Belt tournament
02/28/81	vs. South Florida		Jacksonville Memorial Coliseum • Jacksonville, Florida (semifinals)	W 53-45	22-4
03/01/81	vs. UAB		Jacksonville Memorial Coliseum • Jacksonville, Florida (Finals)	W 62-61^{OT}	23-4
1981 NCAA tournament
03/13/81	vs. (E 12) Long Island	(E 5)	Charlotte Coliseum • Charlotte, North Carolina (first round)	W 86-59	24-4
03/15/81	vs. #15 (E 4) Tennessee	(E 5)	Charlotte Coliseum • Charlotte, North Carolina (second round)	L 56-58^{OT}	24-5

== 1981–82 ==
1981–82 Sun Belt Conference men's basketball standings
	Conf.				Overall
Team	W		L	PCT	W		L	PCT
No. 17 UAB †	9	–	1	.900	25	–	6	.806
VCU	7	–	3	.700	17	–	11	.607
Jacksonville	5	–	5	.500	14	–	13	.519
South Florida	4	–	6	.400	17	–	11	.607
UNC Charlotte	3	–	7	.300	15	–	12	.556
South Alabama	2	–	8	.200	12	–	16	.429
† 1982 Sun Belt Conference tournament winner Rankings from AP Poll

Date	Opponent^{#}	Rank^{#}	Site	Result	Record
Non-Conference Regular Season
11/27/81	vs. George Mason		University Hall • Charlottesville, Virginia (Cavalier Invitational)	L 68-81	0-1
11/29/81	vs. Fairfield		University Hall • Charlottesville, Virginia (Cavalier Invitational)	L 54-58^{OT}	0-2
12/02/81	Johns Hopkins		Richmond Coliseum • Richmond, Virginia	W 74-46	1-2
12/07/81	at East Tennessee State		Memorial Center • Johnson City, Tennessee	W 79-72	2-2
Sun Belt Conference Regular Season
12/12/81	South Alabama		Richmond Coliseum • Richmond, Virginia	W 90-64	3-2 (1-0)
12/19/81	James Madison		Richmond Coliseum • Richmond, Virginia	L 45-47	3-3
12/22/81	Old Dominion		Richmond Coliseum • Richmond, Virginia	W 61-55	4-3
12/29/81	vs. James Madison		Richmond Coliseum • Richmond, Virginia (Times–Dispatch Invitational)	L 46-54	4-4
12/30/81	vs. Richmond		Richmond Coliseum • Richmond, Virginia (Times–Dispatch Invitational)	W 59-53	5-4
01/02/82	at UAB		Birmingham–Jefferson Civic Center • Birmingham, Alabama	W 55-54	6-4 (2-0)
01/09/82	at Charlotte		Belk Gymnasium • Charlotte, North Carolina	L 75-79^{2OT}	6-5 (2-1)
01/11/82	William & Mary		Richmond Coliseum • Richmond, Virginia	W 63-62^{OT}	7-5
01/17/82	at South Alabama		Jag Gym • Mobile, Alabama	W 74-67	8-5 (3-1)
01/20/82	Jacksonville		Richmond Coliseum • Richmond, Virginia	W 92-68	9-5 (4-1)
01/23/82	South Florida		Richmond Coliseum • Richmond, Virginia	W 64-44	10-5 (5-1)
01/25/82	Southern Mississippi		Richmond Coliseum • Richmond, Virginia	W 71-60	11-5
01/27/82	at Saint Joseph's		Alumni Memorial Fieldhouse • Philadelphia, PA	L 52-60	11-6
01/30/82	at Old Dominion		ODU Fieldhouse • Norfolk, Virginia	L 58-61	11-7
01/31/82	Charlotte		Richmond Coliseum • Richmond, Virginia	W 80-58	12-7 (6-1)
02/06/82	at James Madison		James Madison Convocation Center • Harrisonburg, Virginia	W 68-66^{OT}	13-7
02/08/82	Richmond		Richmond Coliseum • Richmond, Virginia	W 77-63	14-7
02/10/82	at Richmond		Robins Center • Richmond, Virginia	L 59-64	14-8
02/14/82	at South Florida		USF Sun Dome • Tampa, Florida	L 68-71	14-9 (6-2)
02/17/82	at Jacksonville		Jacksonville Coliseum • Jacksonville, Florida	W 81-73	15-9 (7–2)
02/20/82	UAB		Hampton Coliseum • Hampton, Virginia	L 55-56	15-10 (7-3)
02/23/82	at William & Mary		Kaplan Arena • Williamsburg, Virginia	W 65-63	16-10
1982 Sun Belt tournament
02/27/82	vs. South Alabama		Birmingham–Jefferson Civic Center • Birmingham, Alabama (semifinals)	W 68-66	17-10
02/28/82	vs. UAB		Birmingham–Jefferson Civic Center • Birmingham, Alabama (Finals)	L 83-94	17-11

== 1982–83 ==
1982–83 Sun Belt Conference men's basketball standings
	Conf.				Overall
Team	W		L	PCT	W		L	PCT
Old Dominion	12	–	2	.857	19	–	10	.655
VCU	12	–	2	.857	24	–	7	.774
UAB †	9	–	5	.643	19	–	14	.576
South Florida	8	–	6	.571	22	–	10	.688
South Alabama	6	–	8	.429	16	–	12	.571
UNC Charlotte	5	–	9	.357	8	–	20	.286
Western Kentucky	4	–	10	.286	12	–	16	.429
Jacksonville	0	–	14	.000	7	–	22	.241
† 1983 Sun Belt Conference tournament winner Rankings from AP Poll

Date	Opponent^{#}	Rank^{#}	Site	Result	Record
Non-Conference Regular Season
11/26/82	vs. George Mason		University Hall • Charlottesville, Virginia (Cavalier Invitational)	W 78-67	1–0
11/27/82	vs. #1 Virginia		University Hall • Charlottesville, Virginia (Cavalier Invitational)	L 63-69	1-1
12/01/82	East Tennessee State		Richmond Coliseum • Richmond, Virginia	W 83-60	2-1
12/04/82	Saint Joseph's		Richmond Coliseum • Richmond, Virginia	W 75-64	3-1
12/08/82	Richmond		Richmond Coliseum • Richmond, Virginia	W 54-48	4–1
12/11/82	at James Madison		James Madison Convocation Center • Harrisonburg, Virginia	L 57-66	4-2
12/17/82	vs. Robert Morris		WVU Coliseum • Morgantown, West Virginia (Mountaineer Classic)	W 94-79	5-2
12/18/82	vs. #20 West Virginia		WVU Coliseum • Morgantown, West Virginia (Mountaineer Classic)	L 65-66^{OT}	5-3
Sun Belt Conference Regular Season
12/29/82	vs. Old Dominion		Richmond Coliseum • Richmond, Virginia (Times–Dispatch Invitational)	L 85-90	5-4 (0-1)
12/30/82	vs. Richmond		Richmond Coliseum • Richmond, Virginia (Times–Dispatch Invitational)	W 80-74	6-4
01/04/83	at UAB		Birmingham–Jefferson Civic Center • Birmingham, Alabama	W 67-65	7-4 (1-1)
01/08/83	at Richmond		Robins Center • Richmond, Virginia	W 65-56	8-4
01/11/83	Old Dominion		Hampton Coliseum • Hampton, Virginia	L 62-67	8-5 (1-2)
01/15/83	South Alabama		Richmond Coliseum • Richmond, Virginia	W 89-77	9-5 (2–2)
01/20/83	at Southern Mississippi		Reed Green Coliseum • Hattiesburg, Mississippi	W 78-64	10-5
01/23/83	at South Alabama		Jag Gym • Mobile, Alabama	W 79-76^{OT}	11-5 (3-2)
01/29/83	Charlotte		Richmond Coliseum • Richmond, Virginia	W 90-76	12-5 (4–2)
01/31/83	at William & Mary		Kaplan Arena • Williamsburg, Virginia	W 50-49	13-5
02/03/83	at Western Kentucky		Diddle Arena • Bowling Green, Kentucky	W 70-57	14-5 (5-2)
02/06/83	South Florida		Richmond Coliseum • Richmond, Virginia	W 70-63^{OT}	15-5 (6-2)
02/09/83	James Madison		Richmond Coliseum • Richmond, Virginia	W 59-53	16-5
02/12/83	at South Florida		USF Sun Dome • Tampa, Florida	W 60-58	17-5 (7-2)
02/14/83	at Jacksonville		Jacksonville Coliseum • Jacksonville, Florida	W 68-61	18-5 (8–2)
02/17/83	UAB		Richmond Coliseum • Richmond, Virginia	W 80-68	19-5 (9–2)
02/19/83	Western Kentucky		Richmond Coliseum • Richmond, Virginia	W 60-47	20-5 (10–2)
02/23/83	Jacksonville		Richmond Coliseum • Richmond, Virginia	W 65-58	21-5 (11–2)
02/26/83	at Charlotte		Belk Gymnasium • Charlotte, North Carolina	W 73-71	22-5 (12-2)
1983 Sun Belt tournament
03/04/83	vs. Western Kentucky		Birmingham–Jefferson Civic Center • Birmingham, Alabama (quarterfinals)	W 57-55	23-5
03/05/83	vs. UAB		Birmingham–Jefferson Civic Center • Birmingham, Alabama (semifinals)	L 59-61	23-6
1983 NCAA tournament
03/17/83	vs. (E 12) La Salle	(E 5)	Greensboro Coliseum • Greensboro, North Carolina (first round)	W 76-67	23–6
03/18/83	vs. #18 (E 4) Georgia	(E 5)	Greensboro Coliseum • Greensboro, North Carolina (second round)	L 54-56	23–7

== 1983–84 ==
1983–84 Sun Belt Conference men's basketball standings
	Conf.				Overall
Team	W		L	PCT	W		L	PCT
VCU	11	–	3	.786	23	–	7	.767
Old Dominion	9	–	5	.643	19	–	12	.613
South Florida	9	–	5	.643	17	–	11	.607
South Alabama	9	–	5	.643	22	–	8	.733
UAB †	8	–	6	.571	23	–	11	.676
Western Kentucky	5	–	9	.357	12	–	17	.414
Jacksonville	3	–	11	.214	12	–	16	.429
UNC Charlotte	2	–	12	.143	9	–	19	.321
† 1984 Sun Belt Conference tournament winner Rankings from AP Poll

Date	Opponent^{#}	Rank^{#}	Site	Result	Record
Non-Conference Regular Season
12/01/83	Johns Hopkins	#20	Richmond Coliseum • Richmond, Virginia	W 94–46	1–0
12/03/83	East Carolina	#20	Richmond Coliseum • Richmond, Virginia	W 75–54	2–0
12/06/83	William & Mary		Richmond Coliseum • Richmond, Virginia	W 41–38	3–0
12/10/83	Richmond		Richmond Coliseum • Richmond, Virginia	W 59-45	4–0
12/16/83	vs. BYU		Rupp Arena • Lexington, Kentucky (University of Kentucky Invitational)	L 77–81	4–1
12/17/83	vs. Wyoming		Rupp Arena • Lexington, Kentucky (University of Kentucky Invitational)	W 70–57	5–1
12/20/83	at Dayton		University of Dayton Arena • Dayton, Ohio	W 73–67	6–1
12/29/83	vs. Old Dominion		Richmond Coliseum • Richmond, Virginia (Times–Dispatch Invitational)	W 83–51	7–1
12/30/83	vs. Richmond		Richmond Coliseum • Richmond, Virginia (Times–Dispatch Invitational)	W 61–47	8–1
Sun Belt Conference Regular Season
01/04/84	at South Alabama		Jag Gym • Mobile, Alabama	L 73–97	8–2 (0–1)
01/09/84	at James Madison		James Madison Convocation Center • Harrisonburg, Virginia	W 72–47	9–2
01/12/84	at Charlotte		Belk Gymnasium • Charlotte, North Carolina	W 64–56	10–2 (1–1)
01/16/84	South Alabama		Richmond Coliseum • Richmond, Virginia	W 84–55	11–2 (2–1)
01/19/84	at UAB		Birmingham–Jefferson Civic Center • Birmingham, Alabama	W 63–61	12–2 (3–1)
01/21/84	at Western Kentucky		Diddle Arena • Bowling Green, Kentucky	W 52–49	13–2 (4–1)
01/26/84	South Florida		Richmond Coliseum • Richmond, Virginia	W 66–54	14–2 (5–1)
01/28/84	at Old Dominion		ODU Fieldhouse • Norfolk, Virginia	L 54–56^{OT}	14–3 (5–2)
02/02/84	at South Florida		USF Sun Dome • Tampa, Florida	W 65–51	15–3 (6–2)
02/04/84	at Jacksonville		Jacksonville Coliseum • Jacksonville, Florida	W 55–49	16–3 (7–2)
02/06/84	UAB		Richmond Coliseum • Richmond, Virginia	W 49–43	17–3 (8–2)
02/09/84	James Madison		Richmond Coliseum • Richmond, Virginia	W 58–45	18–3
02/11/84	WKU		Richmond Coliseum • Richmond, Virginia	W 69–67	19–3 (9–2)
02/14/84	at Richmond		Robins Center • Richmond, Virginia	L 51–56	19–4
02/18/84	Jacksonville		Richmond Coliseum • Richmond, Virginia	W 50–48	20–4 (10–2)
02/22/84	Charlotte		Richmond Coliseum • Richmond, Virginia	W 87–58	21–4 (11–2)
02/25/84	Old Dominion		Richmond Coliseum • Richmond, Virginia	L 55–57	21–5 (11–3)
1984 Sun Belt tournament
03/02/84	vs. Charlotte		Birmingham–Jefferson Civic Center • Birmingham, Alabama (quarterfinals)	W 64–52	22–5
03/03/84	vs. UAB		Birmingham–Jefferson Civic Center • Birmingham, Alabama (semifinals)	L 52–54	22–6
1984 NCAA tournament
03/16/84	vs. (E 11) Northeastern	(E 6)	Brendan Byrne Arena • East Rutherford, New Jersey (first round)	W 70–69	23–6
03/18/84	vs. #18 (E 3) Syracuse	(E 6)	Byrne Arena • East Rutherford, New Jersey (second round)	L 63–78	23–7

== 1984–85 ==
1984–85 Sun Belt Conference men's basketball standings
	Conf.				Overall
Team	W		L	PCT	W		L	PCT
No. 11 VCU †	12	–	2	.857	26	–	6	.813
UAB	11	–	3	.786	25	–	9	.735
Old Dominion	9	–	5	.643	19	–	12	.613
South Florida	6	–	8	.429	18	–	12	.600
Jacksonville	6	–	8	.429	15	–	14	.517
South Alabama	6	–	8	.429	15	–	13	.536
Western Kentucky	5	–	9	.357	14	–	14	.500
UNC Charlotte	1	–	13	.071	5	–	23	.179
† 1985 Sun Belt Conference tournament winner Rankings from AP Poll

Date	Opponent^{#}	Rank^{#}	Site	Result	Record
Non-Conference Regular Season
11/29/84	at East Carolina		Williams Arena at Minges Coliseum • Greenville, North Carolina	W 72-61	1–0
12/01/84	at #6 Louisville		Freedom Hall • Louisville, Kentucky	L 55-67	1–1
12/04/84	at Richmond		Robins Center • Richmond, Virginia	W 69-60	2-1
12/08/84	George Mason		Richmond Coliseum • Richmond, Virginia	W 87-78	3–1
12/15/84	Dayton		Richmond Coliseum • Richmond, Virginia	W 71-61	4–1
12/21/84	vs. Auburn		McKenzie Arena • Chattanooga, Tennessee (Krystal Classic)	W 78-59	5–1
12/22/84	vs. Chattanooga		McKenzie Arena • Chattanooga, Tennessee (Krystal Classic)	W 74-58	6–1
12/28/84	vs. Richmond		Richmond Coliseum • Richmond, Virginia (Times–Dispatch Invitational)	W 68-52	7–1
12/29/84	vs. #16 Virginia Tech		Richmond Coliseum • Richmond, Virginia (Times–Dispatch Invitational)	W 69-65	8–1
Sun Belt Conference Regular Season
01/05/85	at Jacksonville	#20	Jacksonville Coliseum • Jacksonville, Florida	W 67-65^{OT}	9-1 (1-0)
01/10/85	at Western Kentucky	#18	Diddle Arena • Bowling Green, Kentucky	W 72-58	10-1 (2-0)
01/14/85	James Madison	#18	Richmond Coliseum • Richmond, Virginia	W 95-52	11-1
01/17/85	at Charlotte	#16	Bojangles' Coliseum • Charlotte, North Carolina	W 85-75	12-1 (3-0)
01/19/85	South Florida	#16	Richmond Coliseum • Richmond, Virginia	L 58-60	12–2 (3-1)
01/22/85	West Virginia	#19	Richmond Coliseum • Richmond, Virginia	W 72-60	13–2
01/24/85	at South Alabama	#19	Jag Gym • Mobile, Alabama	W 71-70	14-2 (4-1)
01/26/85	at UAB	#19	Birmingham–Jefferson Civic Center • Birmingham, Alabama	L 62-66	14-3 (4-2)
01/31/85	Jacksonville		Richmond Coliseum • Richmond, Virginia	W 81-54	15-3 (5–2)
02/02/85	at South Florida		USF Sun Dome • Tampa, Florida	W 62-55	16–3 (6–2)
02/05/85	at James Madison		James Madison Convocation Center • Harrisonburg, Virginia	L 65-66	16-4
02/07/85	Charlotte		Richmond Coliseum • Richmond, Virginia	W 77-56	17–4 (7–2)
02/09/85	South Alabama		Richmond Coliseum • Richmond, Virginia	W 53-45	18-4 (8-2)
02/13/85	#19 UAB		Richmond Coliseum • Richmond, Virginia	W 67-53	19-4 (9-2)
02/16/85	Old Dominion		Richmond Coliseum • Richmond, Virginia	W 90-71	20-4 (10-2)
02/21/85	WKU	#17	Richmond Coliseum • Richmond, Virginia	W 85-62	21-4 (11–2)
02/23/85	at #4 Memphis	#17	Mid-South Coliseum • Memphis, Tennessee	L 73-81	21-5
02/25/85	at Old Dominion	#17	ODU Fieldhouse • Norfolk, Virginia	W 78-66	22-5 (12-2)
1985 Sun Belt tournament
03/01/85	vs. Charlotte	#17	Hampton Coliseum • Hampton, Virginia (quarterfinals)	W 85-62	23–5
03/02/85	vs. Jacksonville	#17	Hampton Coliseum • Hampton, Virginia (semifinals)	W 75-57	24–5
03/03/85	vs. Old Dominion	#17	Hampton Coliseum • Hampton, Virginia (Finals)	W 87-82	25–5
1985 NCAA tournament
03/15/85	vs. (W 15) Marshall	#11 (W 2)	University Arena • Albuquerque, New Mexico (first round)	W 81-65	26-5
03/17/85	vs. (W 7) Alabama	#11 (W 2)	University Arena • Albuquerque, New Mexico (second round)	L 59-63	26-6

== 1985–86 ==
1985–86 Sun Belt Conference men's basketball standings
	Conf.				Overall
Team	W		L	PCT	W		L	PCT
Old Dominion	11	–	3	.786	23	–	8	.742
Western Kentucky	10	–	4	.714	23	–	8	.742
UAB	9	–	5	.643	25	–	11	.694
Jacksonville †	9	–	5	.643	21	–	10	.677
VCU	6	–	8	.429	12	–	16	.429
South Alabama	5	–	9	.357	16	–	16	.500
South Florida	5	–	9	.357	14	–	14	.500
UNC Charlotte	1	–	13	.071	8	–	20	.286
† 1986 Sun Belt Conference tournament winner Rankings from AP Poll

Date	Opponent^{#}	Rank^{#}	Site	Result	Record
Non-Conference Regular Season
11/30/85	vs. UNC Wilmington		University Hall • Charlottesville, Virginia (Cavalier Invitational)	W 76-75	1–0
12/01/85	vs. Virginia		University Hall • Charlottesville, Virginia (Cavalier Invitational)	L 75-79^{OT}	1-1
12/03/85	Richmond		Richmond Coliseum • Richmond, Virginia	L 59-64	1-2
12/07/85	at Virginia Tech		Cassell Coliseum • Blacksburg, Virginia	L 52-78	1-3
12/14/85	Virginia Tech		Richmond Coliseum • Richmond, Virginia	L 65-67	1-4
12/20/85	vs. Richmond		Richmond Coliseum • Richmond, Virginia (Times–Dispatch Invitational)	L 65-67^{OT}	1-5
12/21/85	vs. Old Dominion		Richmond Coliseum • Richmond, Virginia (Times–Dispatch Invitational)	L 55-67	1-6
12/30/85	at George Mason		Patriot Center • Fairfax, Virginia	W 77-68	2-6
Sun Belt Conference Regular Season
01/07/86	at South Alabama		Jag Gym • Mobile, Alabama	L 62-63^{OT}	2-7 (0-1)
01/09/86	at #14 UAB		Birmingham–Jefferson Civic Center • Birmingham, Alabama	L 70-72^{OT}	2-8 (0-2)
01/11/86	at Dayton		UD Arena • Dayton, Ohio	L 64-74	2-9
01/13/86	James Madison		Richmond Coliseum • Richmond, Virginia	W 72-51	3-9
01/16/86	Charlotte		Richmond Coliseum • Richmond, Virginia	W 67-50	4-9 (1-2)
01/18/86	at Old Dominion		ODU Fieldhouse • Norfolk, Virginia	L 49-50	4-10 (1-3)
01/20/86	at Western Kentucky		Diddle Arena • Bowling Green, Kentucky	L 60-62	4-11 (1-4)
01/23/86	Jacksonville		Richmond Coliseum • Richmond, Virginia	W 81-80^{2OT}	5-11 (2-4)
01/25/86	South Alabama		Richmond Coliseum • Richmond, Virginia	W 83-74	6-11 (3-4)
01/27/86	Marquette		Richmond Coliseum • Richmond, Virginia	W 61-56	7-11
01/30/86	William & Mary		Richmond Coliseum • Richmond, Virginia	W 60-44	8-11
02/01/86	at South Florida		USF Sun Dome • Tampa, Florida	L 67-77	8-12 (3-5)
02/03/86	at Charlotte		Bojangles' Coliseum • Charlotte, North Carolina	W 87-70	9-12 (4-5)
02/06/86	UAB		Richmond Coliseum • Richmond, Virginia	W 63-57	10-12 (5-5)
02/13/86	Old Dominion		Richmond Coliseum • Richmond, Virginia	L 56-61	10-13 (5-6)
02/15/86	South Florida		Richmond Coliseum • Richmond, Virginia	L 60-64^{OT}	10-14 (5-7)
02/17/86	at Jacksonville		Jacksonville Coliseum • Jacksonville, Florida	L 58-67	10-15 (5-8)
02/19/86	at James Madison		James Madison Convocation Center • Harrisonburg, Virginia	W 66-65	11-15
02/22/86	WKU		Richmond Coliseum • Richmond, Virginia	W 60-56	12-15 (6-8)
1986 Sun Belt tournament
02/27/86	vs. Jacksonville		Birmingham–Jefferson Civic Center • Birmingham, Alabama	L 49-56	12-16

== 1986–87 ==
1986–87 Sun Belt Conference men's basketball standings
	Conf.				Overall
Team	W		L	PCT	W		L	PCT
Western Kentucky	12	–	2	.857	29	–	9	.763
Jacksonville	11	–	3	.786	19	–	11	.633
UAB †	10	–	4	.714	21	–	11	.656
Virginia Commonwealth	7	–	7	.500	17	–	14	.548
UNC Charlotte	6	–	8	.429	18	–	14	.563
South Alabama	6	–	8	.429	14	–	14	.500
South Florida	3	–	11	.214	8	–	20	.286
Old Dominion	1	–	13	.071	6	–	22	.214
† 1987 Sun Belt Conference tournament winner Rankings from AP Poll

Date	Opponent^{#}	Rank^{#}	Site	Result	Record
Non-Conference Regular Season
11/28/86	vs. Vanderbilt		Lahaina Civic Center • Maui, Hawaii (Hawaiian Airlines-Silversword Classic)	L 67-75	0–1
11/29/86	vs. Arkansas State		Lahaina Civic Center • Maui, Hawaii (Hawaiian Airlines-Silversword Classic)	W 65-57	1–1
11/30/86	vs. UNC Charlotte		Lahaina Civic Center • Maui, Hawaii (Hawaiian Airlines-Silversword Classic)	L 75-87	1–2
12/04/86	at William & Mary		Lahaina Civic Center • Maui, Hawaii	W 73-64	2–2
12/04/86	Dayton		Richmond Coliseum • Richmond, Virginia	W 69-58	3–2
12/08/86	Morgan State		Richmond Coliseum • Richmond, Virginia	W 75-43	4–2
12/13/86	George Mason		Richmond Coliseum • Richmond, Virginia	W 73-68	5–2
12/20/86	Cleveland State		Richmond Coliseum • Richmond, Virginia	L 89-91^{OT}	5–3
12/29/86	James Madison		Richmond Coliseum • Richmond, Virginia (Times-Dispatch Invitational)	L 74-90	5–4
12/30/86	Richmond		Richmond Coliseum • Richmond, Virginia (Times-Dispatch Invitational)	W 60-57	6–4
Sun Belt Conference Regular Season
01/03/87	UNC Charlotte		Richmond Coliseum • Richmond, Virginia	W 68-55	7–4 (1-0)
01/08/87	at Old Dominion		ODU Fieldhouse • Norfolk, Virginia	W 77-64	8–4 (2-0)
01/10/87	at Marquette		MECCA Arena • Milwaukee, Wisconsin	W 63-60	9–4
01/12/87	Western Kentucky		Richmond Coliseum • Richmond, Virginia	L 70-79	9–5 (2-1)
01/14/87	at South Alabama		Jag Gym • Mobile, Alabama	W 81-68	10–5 (3-1)
01/17/87	at Western Kentucky		E. A. Diddle Arena • Bowling Green, Kentucky	L 71-90	10–6 (3-2)
01/20/87	UAB		Richmond Coliseum • Richmond, Virginia	L 70-79	10–7 (3-3)
01/22/87	at Richmond		Robins Center • Richmond, Virginia	W 79-66	11–7
01/24/87	at South Florida		Sun Dome • Tampa, Florida	W 61-57	12–7 (4-3)
01/26/87	at Virginia Tech		Cassell Coliseum • Blacksburg, Virginia	W 70-65	13–7
01/28/87	East Carolina		Richmond Coliseum • Richmond, Virginia	L 56-57	13–8
01/31/87	South Florida		Richmond Coliseum • Richmond, Virginia	W 68-66^{OT}	14–8 (5-3)
02/02/87	South Alabama		Richmond Coliseum • Richmond, Virginia	L 57-70	14–9 (5-4)
02/05/87	at UAB		Birmingham-Jefferson Civic Center • Birmingham, Alabama	L 71-77	14–10 (5-5)
02/07/87	Jacksonville		Richmond Coliseum • Richmond, Virginia	L 66-77	14–11 (5-6)
02/08/87	Rutgers		Richmond Coliseum • Richmond, Virginia	W 78-67	15–11
02/11/87	at Jacksonville		Jacksonville Memorial Coliseum • Jacksonville, Florida	W 88-75	16–11 (6-6)
02/14/87	Old Dominion		Richmond Coliseum • Richmond, Virginia	W 78-66	17–11 (7-6)
02/18/87	James Madison		Richmond Coliseum • Richmond, Virginia	L 57-60	17–12 (7-6)
02/21/87	at UNC Charlotte		Charlotte Coliseum • Charlotte, North Carolina	L 74-83	17–13 (7-7)
1987 Sun Belt tournament
02/26/87	vs. Charlotte		E. A. Diddle Arena • Bowling Green, Kentucky	L 73-88	17–14

== 1987–88 ==
1987–88 Sun Belt Conference men's basketball standings
	Conf.				Overall
Team	W		L	PCT	W		L	PCT
UNC Charlotte †	11	–	3	.786	22	–	9	.710
VCU	10	–	4	.714	23	–	12	.657
Old Dominion	9	–	5	.643	18	–	12	.600
South Alabama	8	–	6	.571	15	–	14	.517
UAB	7	–	7	.500	16	–	15	.516
Western Kentucky	6	–	8	.429	15	–	13	.536
South Florida	3	–	11	.214	6	–	22	.214
Jacksonville	2	–	12	.143	8	–	21	.276
† 1988 Sun Belt Tournament winner Rankings from AP Poll

== 1988–89 ==
1988–89 Sun Belt Conference men's basketball standings
	Conf.				Overall
Team	W		L	PCT	W		L	PCT
South Alabama †	11	–	3	.786	23	–	9	.719
UNC Charlotte	10	–	4	.714	17	–	12	.586
VCU	9	–	5	.643	13	–	15	.464
UAB	8	–	6	.571	22	–	12	.647
Old Dominion	7	–	7	.500	15	–	13	.536
Jacksonville	5	–	9	.357	14	–	16	.467
Western Kentucky	4	–	10	.286	14	–	15	.483
South Florida	2	–	12	.143	7	–	21	.250
† 1989 Sun Belt Conference tournament winner Rankings from AP Poll

== 1989–90 ==
1989–90 Sun Belt Conference men's basketball standings
	Conf.				Overall
Team	W		L	PCT	W		L	PCT
UAB	12	–	2	.857	22	–	9	.710
South Florida †	9	–	5	.643	20	–	11	.645
Old Dominion	7	–	7	.500	14	–	14	.500
Western Kentucky	7	–	7	.500	13	–	17	.433
UNC Charlotte	6	–	8	.429	16	–	14	.533
Jacksonville	5	–	9	.357	13	–	16	.448
South Alabama	5	–	9	.357	11	–	17	.393
VCU	5	–	9	.357	11	–	17	.393
† 1990 Sun Belt Conference tournament winner Rankings from AP Poll

== 1990–91 ==
1990–91 Sun Belt Conference men's basketball standings
	Conf.				Overall
Team	W		L	PCT	W		L	PCT
South Alabama †	11	–	3	.786	22	–	9	.710
UAB	9	–	5	.643	18	–	13	.581
South Florida	8	–	6	.571	19	–	11	.633
Western Kentucky	8	–	6	.571	14	–	14	.500
VCU	7	–	7	.500	14	–	17	.452
Old Dominion	5	–	9	.357	14	–	18	.438
UNC Charlotte	6	–	8	.429	14	–	14	.500
Jacksonville	2	–	12	.143	6	–	22	.214
† 1991 Sun Belt Conference tournament winner Rankings from AP Poll
