= 1985–86 Old Dominion Monarchs basketball team =

American college basketball season

1985–86 Old Dominion Monarchs basketball

Sun Belt regular season champions

NCAA tournament, Second Round
- Conference: Sun Belt Conference
- Record: 23–8 (11–3 Sun Belt)
- Head coach: Tom Young (1st season)
- Home arena: Norfolk Scope; Hampton Coliseum (alternate)

1985–86 Sun Belt Conference men's basketball standings
	Conf.				Overall
Team	W		L	PCT	W		L	PCT
Old Dominion	11	–	3	.786	23	–	8	.742
Western Kentucky	10	–	4	.714	23	–	8	.742
UAB	9	–	5	.643	25	–	11	.694
Jacksonville †	9	–	5	.643	21	–	10	.677
VCU	6	–	8	.429	12	–	16	.429
South Alabama	5	–	9	.357	16	–	16	.500
South Florida	5	–	9	.357	14	–	14	.500
UNC Charlotte	1	–	13	.071	8	–	20	.286
† 1986 Sun Belt Conference tournament winner Rankings from AP Poll

The 1985–86 Old Dominion Monarchs basketball team represented Old Dominion University in the 1985–86 college basketball season. This was head coach Tom Young's 1st season at Old Dominion. The Monarchs competed in the Sun Belt Conference and played their home games at the ODU Fieldhouse. They finished the season 23–8, 11–3 in Sun Belt play to the regular season conference title. They lost in the semifinals of the 1986 Sun Belt Conference men's basketball tournament, but did earn an at-large bid to the NCAA tournament. As No. 8 seed in the East Region where they defeated No. 9 seed West Virginia in the opening round before losing to No. 1 seed and eventual National runner-up Duke in the round of 32.

== Roster ==
1985–86 Old Dominion Monarchs men's basketball team
Players	Coaches
Pos. / # / Name / Height / Weight / Year / Hometown; C / / Kenny Gattison / 6 ft 8 in (2.03 m) / 220 lb (100 kg) / Sr / Wilmington, North Carolina	Head coach: Tom Young; Assistant coach(es) Legend: (C) Team captain; (S) Suspended; (I) Ineligible; (W) Walk-on; Injured; Current redshirt

== Schedule and results ==
Date time, TV	Rank^{#}	Opponent^{#}	Result	Record	Site (attendance) city, state
Exhibition
Nov 23, 1985*		Czechoslovakia	W 81–62		Norfolk Scope; Norfolk, Virginia
Regular season
Nov 27, 1985*		Randolph–Macon	W 78–54	0–1	Norfolk Scope; Norfolk, Virginia
Nov 30, 1985*		Virginia Tech	L 76–90	1–1	Norfolk Scope; Norfolk, Virginia
Dec 9, 1985*		Rider	W 93–46	2–1	Norfolk Scope; Norfolk, Virginia
Dec 14, 1985*		James Madison; Rivalry	W 57–50	3–1	Norfolk Scope; Norfolk, Virginia
Dec 17, 1985*		at No. 7 Georgia Tech	L 86–96	3–2	Alexander Memorial Coliseum; Atlanta, Georgia
Dec 20, 1985*		vs. Virginia	L 61–68	3–3	Richmond Coliseum; Richmond, Virginia
Dec 21, 1985*		at VCU; Rivalry	W 67–55	4–3	Richmond Coliseum; Richmond, Virginia
Dec 28, 1985		at Western Kentucky	W 62–59	5–3 (1–0)	E.A. Diddle Arena; Bowling Green, Kentucky
Jan 4, 1986		at No. 16 UAB	L 51–66	5–4 (1–1)	Birmingham-Jefferson Civic Center (10,497); Birmingham, Alabama
Jan 13, 1986		at Charlotte	W 94–87	6–4 (2–1)	Charlotte Coliseum; Charlotte, North Carolina
Jan 15, 1986*		at William & Mary	W 75–44	7–4	Kaplan Arena; Williamsburg, Virginia
Jan 18, 1986		VCU; Rivalry	W 50–49	8–4 (3–1)	Norfolk Scope; Norfolk, Virginia
Jan 20, 1986		at South Alabama	W 75–57	9–4 (4–1)	Jaguar Gym; Mobile, Alabama
Jan 23, 1986		South Florida	W 47–43	10–4 (5–1)	Norfolk Scope; Norfolk, Virginia
Jan 25, 1986		Jacksonville	W 64–56	11–4 (6–1)	Norfolk Scope; Norfolk, Virginia
Jan 27, 1986*		at Richmond	W 62–59	12–4	Robins Center; Richmond, Virginia
Jan 30, 1986		UAB	L 58–71	12–5 (6–2)	Norfolk Scope (7,214); Norfolk, Virginia
Feb 1, 1986		UNC Charlotte	W 88–70	13–5 (7–2)	Norfolk Scope; Norfolk, Virginia
Feb 3, 1986*		at James Madison; Rivalry	W 59–53	14–5	Convocation Center; Harrisonburg, Virginia
Feb 6, 1986		Western Kentucky	W 74–61	15–5 (8–2)	Norfolk Scope; Norfolk, Virginia
Feb 8, 1986		South Alabama	W 54–52	16–5 (9–2)	Norfolk Scope; Norfolk, Virginia
Feb 11, 1986*		DePaul	W 66–53	17–5	Norfolk Scope; Norfolk, Virginia
Feb 13, 1986		at VCU; Rivalry	W 61–56	18–5 (10–2)	Richmond Coliseum; Richmond, Virginia
Feb 15, 1986		at Jacksonville	L 51–69	18–6 (10–3)	Jacksonville Memorial Coliseum; Jacksonville, Florida
Feb 17, 1986		at South Florida	W 64–57	19–6 (11–3)	Sun Dome; Tampa, Florida
Feb 20, 1986*		William & Mary	W 58–47	20–6	Norfolk Scope; Norfolk, Virginia
Feb 22, 1986*		Central Connecticut State	W 75–51	21–6	Norfolk Scope; Norfolk, Virginia
Sun Belt tournament
Feb 27, 1986*	(1)	vs. (8) Charlotte; Quarterfinals	W 76–67	22–6	Birmingham-Jefferson Civic Center; Birmingham, Alabama
Feb 28, 1986*	(1)	vs. (4) Jacksonville; Semifinals	L 61–67	22–7	Birmingham-Jefferson Civic Center; Birmingham, Alabama
NCAA tournament
Mar 13, 1986*	(8 E)	vs. (9 E) West Virginia; First Round	W 72–64	23–7	Greensboro Coliseum; Greensboro, North Carolina
Mar 15, 1986*	(8 E)	vs. (1 E) No. 1 Duke; Second Round	L 61–89	23–8	Greensboro Coliseum; Greensboro, North Carolina
*Non-conference game. ^{#}Rankings from AP poll. (#) Tournament seedings in parentheses. E=East. All times are in Eastern Time.

== Awards and honors ==
- Kenny Gattison – Sun Belt Player of the Year
- Tom Young – Sun Belt co-Coach of the Year

== NBA draft ==
Round	Pick	Player	NBA club
3	55	Kenny Gattison	Phoenix Suns
