= Birmingham Arena =

Birmingham Arena may refer to one of the following arenas:

United Kingdom:

- Arena Birmingham in Birmingham, England, best known by its former name, the National Indoor Arena (NIA)
- bp pulse LIVE in Birmingham, England, best known by its former name, National Exhibition Centre Arena (NEC)

United States:

- Legacy Arena, in Birmingham, Alabama
