= 1986 Sun Belt Conference men's basketball tournament =

- Classification: Division I
- Season: 1985–86
- Teams: 8
- Site: Birmingham–Jefferson Civic Center; Birmingham, AL
- Champions: Jacksonville (2nd title)
- Winning coach: Bob Wenzel (1st title)
- MVP: Otis Smith (Jacksonville)

1985–86 Sun Belt Conference men's basketball standings
	Conf.				Overall
Team	W		L	PCT	W		L	PCT
Old Dominion	11	–	3	.786	23	–	8	.742
Western Kentucky	10	–	4	.714	23	–	8	.742
UAB	9	–	5	.643	25	–	11	.694
Jacksonville †	9	–	5	.643	21	–	10	.677
VCU	6	–	8	.429	12	–	16	.429
South Alabama	5	–	9	.357	16	–	16	.500
South Florida	5	–	9	.357	14	–	14	.500
UNC Charlotte	1	–	13	.071	8	–	20	.286
† 1986 Sun Belt Conference tournament winner Rankings from AP Poll

The 1986 Sun Belt Conference men's basketball tournament was held February 27–March 1 at the Birmingham–Jefferson Civic Center in Birmingham, Alabama.

Jacksonville upset hosts UAB in the championship game, 70–69, to win their second Sun Belt men's basketball tournament.

The Dolphins, in turn, received an automatic bid for the 1986 NCAA tournament. They were joined in the tournament by fellow Sun Belt members Old Dominion, UAB, and Western Kentucky, all of whom received at-large bids.

== Format ==
There were no changes to the existing tournament format. All eight conference members were placed into the initial quarterfinal round and each team was seeded based on its regular season conference record.

== Bracket ==
Quarterfinals; Friday, February 27
1	Old Dominion	76
8	UNC Charlotte	67
5	VCU	49
4	Jacksonville	56
3	UAB	64
6	South Alabama	51
7	South Florida	46
2	Western Kentucky	57

Semifinals; Saturday, February 28
1	Old Dominion	61
4	Jacksonville	67
3	UAB	57
2	Western Kentucky	45

Championship; Sunday, March 1
4	Jacksonville	70
3	UAB	69

== See also ==
- Sun Belt Conference women's basketball tournament
