= Bob Wenzel =

American college basketball coach and broadcaster (born 1949)

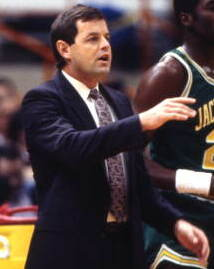
- Wenzel circa 1986

Biographical details
- Born: October 4, 1949 (age 77); Bronx, New York, U.S.

Playing career
- 1968–1971: Rutgers
- Position: Guard

Coaching career (HC unless noted)
- 1971–1973: Utah (GA)
- 1973–1974: Yale (assistant)
- 1975–1980: Duke (assistant)
- 1980–1981: South Carolina (assistant)
- 1981–1987: Jacksonville
- 1987–1988: New Jersey Nets (assistant)
- 1988–1997: Rutgers

Head coaching record
- Overall: 216–221 (.494)
- Tournaments: 0–3 (NCAA Division I); 3–3 (NIT)

Accomplishments and honors

Championships
- Sun Belt tournament (1986); A-10 tournament (1989); A-10 regular season (1991)

Awards
- A-10 Coach of the Year (1989); USBWA Most Courageous Award (1986)

Bob Wenzel (born October 4, 1949) is a former American college basketball coach and broadcaster for the Big Ten Network, ESPN, CBS Sports and Fox Sports.

== Biography ==
=== College playing/Coaching career ===
Wenzel graduated from Rutgers University in 1971 with a degree in history, and headed to the University of Utah for his graduate work. In 1973, he earned his master's degree in education from Utah.

While at Utah, Wenzel began his coaching career as a graduate assistant. Upon graduation he moved back east and became an assistant coach at Yale, staying there for one season. He moved on to Duke in 1975, staying with the team through 1980 and playing an important role in the team's run to the 1978 Final Four.

After one season as an assistant at South Carolina, Wenzel was hired by Jacksonville University as its head coach. In five years at Jacksonville (1982–1987), Wenzel led his team to an 88–86 overall record, including an NCAA tournament appearance in 1986 and an NIT appearance in his final year.

During a 1985 home game against South Alabama, Wenzel suffered a near-fatal cerebral aneurysm. He recovered completely and returned to coach Jacksonville the following season. His return would earn him the U.S. Basketball Writers Association's Most Courageous Award for 1986.

Wenzel resigned to be an assistant with the New Jersey Nets for the 1987–88 NBA season, but returned to college the following year to be the head coach of his alma mater. Under Wenzel, Rutgers reached the NCAA tournament twice. The first of those appearances came in 1989, when the #13 seeded Scarlet Knights fell to Iowa in the first round. In 1991, Rutgers returned to the Big Dance as a #9 seed, but fared no better as they were defeated by Arizona State in the first round.

Wenzel also led Rutgers to two NIT appearances. The first of those (1990) saw the Scarlet Knights advance to the quarterfinals of the tournament, falling to eventual third-place finisher Penn State. Rutgers returned to the tournament two years later, but lost a close second-round game to Manhattan.

The 1991–92 season marked the last time Rutgers would finish with a winning record under Wenzel. The team struggled for the next four seasons – with a move from the Atlantic 10 to the Big East Conference in 1995 not making things any easier – and after an 11–16 finish to the 1996–97 campaign, Wenzel was fired and replaced by Kevin Bannon.

=== Broadcasting ===
Shortly after his firing by Rutgers, Wenzel jumped into broadcasting and was hired by ESPN as a color commentator for its college basketball coverage. Wenzel stayed with ESPN until 2013.

He added commentary for CBS in 2001, and worked for them during the NCAA Championship from 2001 until 2012.

Wenzel was hired as an analyst by the Big Ten Network in 2014. Wenzel also calls games for Fox Sports 1 and CBS Sports Network.

=== Personal ===
Wenzel is currently the Associate Head of School for Advancement at The Bolles School in Jacksonville, Florida. He and his wife, Neva, have three children and live in Ponte Vedra Beach, Florida.

Wenzel was inducted into the Suffolk Sports Hall of Fame on Long Island in the Basketball and Coaches Categories with the Class of 2004.

== Head coaching record ==
Record table
Season	Team	Overall	Conference	Standing	Postseason
Jacksonville Dolphins (Sun Belt Conference) (1981–1987)
1981–82	Jacksonville	14–13	5–5	3rd	
1982–83	Jacksonville	7–22	0–14	8th	
1983–84	Jacksonville	12–16	3–11	7th	
1984–85	Jacksonville	15–14	6–8	T–4th	
1985–86	Jacksonville	21–10	9–5	T–3rd	NCAA Division I First Round
1986–87	Jacksonville	19–11	11–3	2nd	NIT First Round
Jacksonville:		88–86 (.506)	34–46 (.425)		
Rutgers Scarlet Knights (Atlantic 10 Conference) (1988–1995)
1988–89	Rutgers	18–13	13–5	3rd	NCAA Division I First Round
1989–90	Rutgers	18–17	11–7	T–3rd	NIT Quarterfinals
1990–91	Rutgers	19–10	14–4	1st	NCAA Division I First Round
1991–92	Rutgers	16–15	6–10	T–6th	NIT Second Round
1992–93	Rutgers	13–15	6–8	7th	
1993–94	Rutgers	11–16	6–10	7th	
1994–95	Rutgers	13–15	7–9	T–6th	
Rutgers Scarlet Knights (Big East Conference) (1995–1997)
1995–96	Rutgers	9–18	6–12	6th (BE 7)	
1996–97	Rutgers	11–16	5–13	T–6th (BE 7)	
Rutgers:		128–135 (.487)	74–78 (.487)		
Total:		216–221 (.494)			
National champion Postseason invitational champion Conference regular season champion Conference regular season and conference tournament champion Division regular season champion Division regular season and conference tournament champion Conference tournament champion
