= Dale F. Halton Arena =

Sports venue in Charlotte, North Carolina, US

- The SAC, The Mine
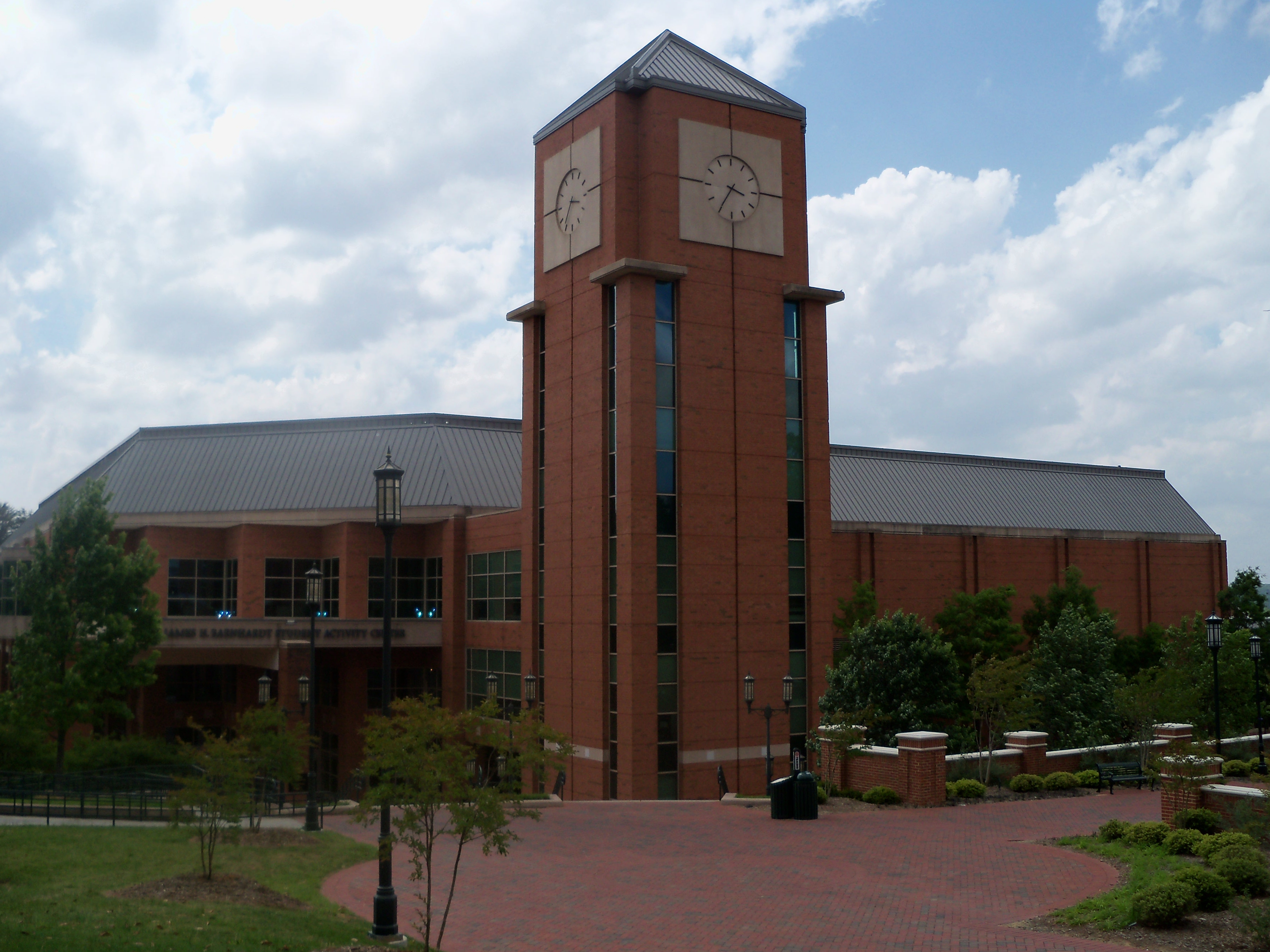
- Interactive map of Dale F. Halton Arena
- Location: 9201 University City Boulevard; Charlotte, NC 28223
- Coordinates: 35°18′22″N 80°44′4″W
- Owner: UNC Charlotte
- Operator: UNC Charlotte
- Capacity: 9,105
- Surface: Hardwood

Construction
- Groundbreaking: November 15, 1993
- Opened: December 2, 1996
- Renovated: 2006, 2008, 2016
- Expanded: 2002
- Cost: $26.5 million ($54.4 million in 2025 dollars)
- Architect: Odell Associates
- Structural engineer: Geiger Engineers
- General contractor: Rodgers Builders

Tenants
- Charlotte 49ers basketball & volleyball (1996–present)

Dale F. Halton Arena at the James H. Barnhardt Student Activity Center (commonly shortened to Halton Arena) is an indoor sports venue located on the main campus of UNC Charlotte in Charlotte, North Carolina in the United States of America. It is the home venue of the Charlotte 49ers men's and women's basketball teams and volleyball team. Halton Arena was named for the former president and CEO of Pepsi-Cola Bottling Company of Charlotte. She was a benefactress to the university and served on the university's board of trustees. The building was funded entirely through private donations and student fees.

The arena is located inside the James H. Barnhardt Student Activity Center (known commonly by students as "The SAC"). Its seating capacity for basketball and volleyball is listed as 9,105, though most of the upper level is curtained off for most women's basketball and volleyball games, reducing seating capacity to around 4,000. The University holds its commencement ceremonies every December and May inside the arena.

== History ==
The arena opened on December 2, 1996, when the 49ers men's basketball team defeated Appalachian State in a non-conference game. It was the fourth primary home court for the 49ers since they joined the NCAA's Division I in 1970; previously the 49ers played at the on-campus Belk Gymnasium, or "The Mine Shaft" (1970–76), Bojangles' Coliseum (1976–88, 1993–96), and the Charlotte Coliseum (1988–93). Even after the men's basketball team began playing its home games off campus, the women's basketball and volleyball teams remained at Belk Gym.

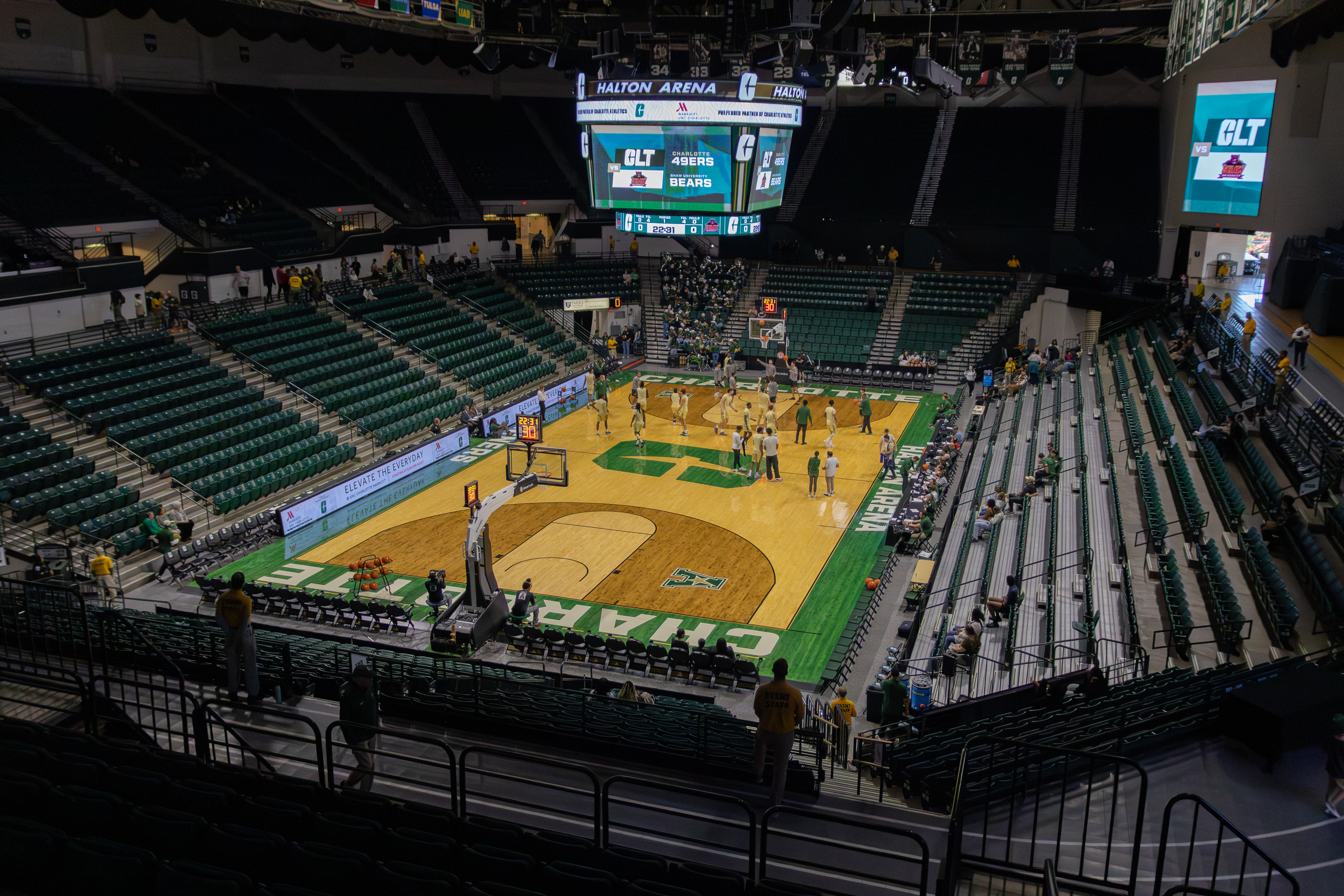
Interior in 2025

Halton Arena has undergone several upgrades over the past several years. In 2002 the Miltimore-Wallis Athletics Training and Academics Center was opened providing a new weight room, The Charles Hayward Memorial Practice Court, Video Communications Center, new Media Relations Office and new coaches' offices for men and women's basketball and volleyball. In 2006, a new high-resolution video screen was added to the hanging scoreboard in the center of the arena. In 2008, the arena purchased the LED court-side displays/tables used at the 2008 Final Four from the NCAA and installed them for use at athletic events. The base of the clock tower contains the ticket office and ticket booths. The 2nd floor holds offices for athletics' marketing, game and facilities operations, and media relations departments. The 2nd floor clock tower and tower access hall hold the administration offices for Venue Management. The 3rd floor houses the athletic department administration offices and meeting spaces. The 3rd floor clock tower and tower access hall hold the offices for the athletic foundation. In 2016, a new $900,000 scoreboard was installed at the area, replacing the previous board.

Halton Arena was the location for the 2005 Conference USA women's basketball tournament and the 2009 Atlantic 10 women's basketball tournament, as well as the 2007 Atlantic 10 volleyball tournament.

== Statues ==
The facility features three Richard Hallier athletic statues depicting sports played at the Arena. The pavilion surrounding the clock tower features statues of male and female basketball players and a volleyball player. There are eleven more Hallier sports statues on the UNC Charlotte campus, all of which were donated by Charlotte businessman and philanthropist Irwin Belk.

== See also ==
- List of NCAA Division I basketball arenas
