= Birmingham Children's Theatre =

Coordinates: 33°31′25.53″N 86°48′51.16″W

The Birmingham Children's Theatre, the professional resident theatre company at the Birmingham–Jefferson Convention Complex in Birmingham, Alabama, is a professional theatres producing live theatre for young audiences. Founded in 1947, the theatre stages eight productions per year, both in-house on two stages and on the road with the Theater-in-Motion tour.

The theatre's Wee Folks section are plays based on familiar fictional stories known to little children. Its Mainstage section aims at older children under age thirteen. A 501(c)(3) non-profit organization, Birmingham Children's Theatre performs for over 160,000 students each year.
