= Legacy Arena =

Arena in Birmingham, Alabama

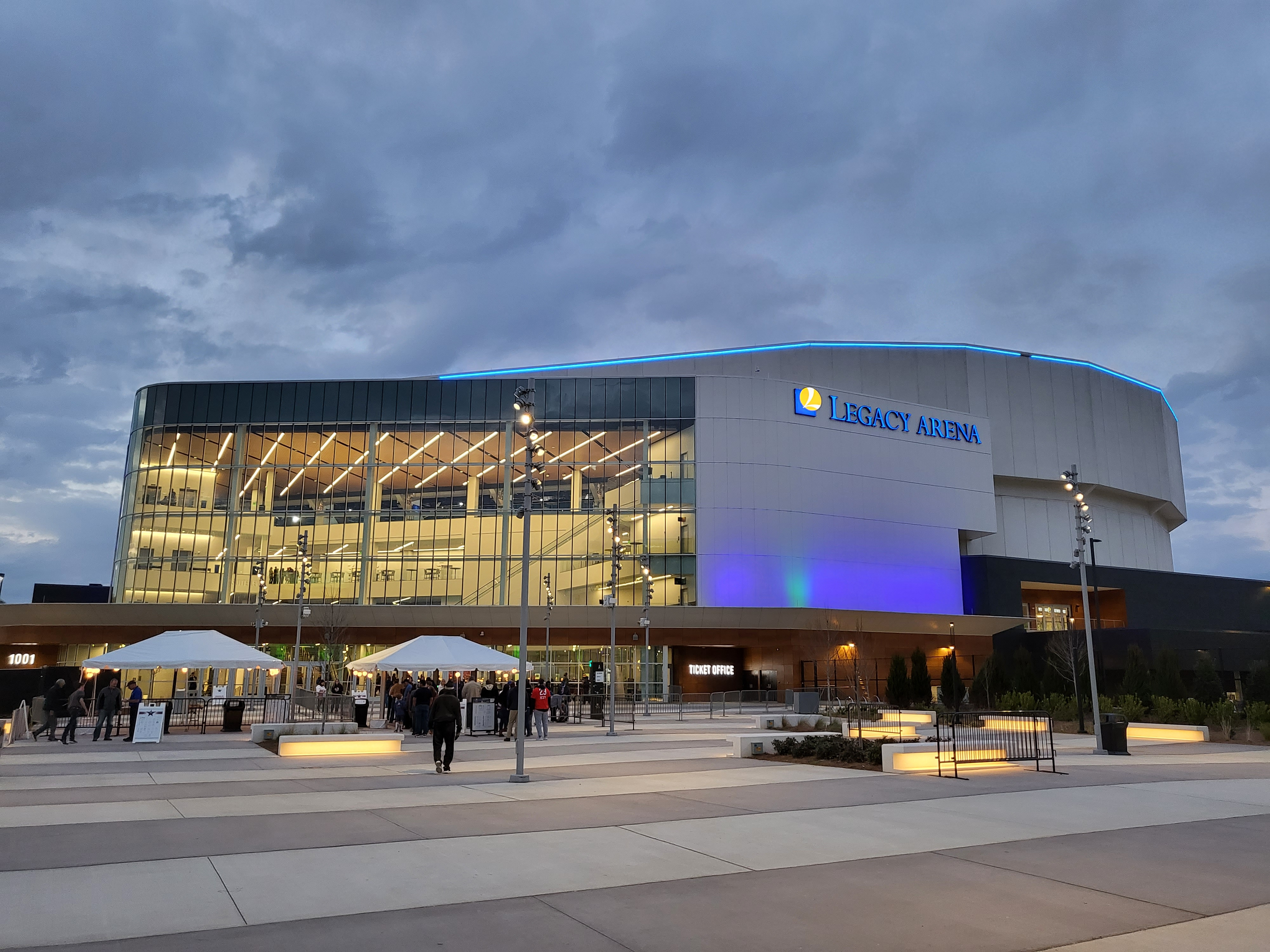

- Location within Alabama Location within the United States
- Former names: BJCC Coliseum (1976–99); BJCC Arena (1999–2014)
- Address: 2100 Richard Arrington Jr. Blvd N.
- Location: Birmingham, Alabama, U.S.
- Coordinates: 33.523780°N 86.812935°W
- Owner: Birmingham-Jefferson Civic Center Authority
- Operator: Comcast Spectra
- Capacity: Concerts: 18,000; Sporting Events: 17,654; Theater seating: 8,000

Construction
- Opened: September 28, 1976
- Renovated: 2020–21

Tenants
- Birmingham Bulls (WHA) (1976–79); UAB Blazers men's basketball (NCAA) (1978–88); Birmingham South Stars (CHL) (1982–83); Birmingham Bulls (ECHL) (1992–2001); Birmingham/Alabama Steeldogs (af2) (2000–07); Birmingham Squadron (NBAGL) (2021–26)

Legacy Arena (formerly known as the BJCC Coliseum and the BJCC Arena) is an arena located at the Birmingham–Jefferson Convention Complex in Birmingham, Alabama. The arena seats 17,654 for sporting events, up to 16,250 for concerts and 6,000 in a cut-down theater configuration.

== Arena information ==
The arena stands ten stories tall, but it actually measures only 75 feet (23 m) from floor to ceiling and contains an oval-shaped 24,200-square-foot (2,244.5 m^{2}) (110' by 220' (33.5 x 67 m)) arena floor. The arena contains several luxury suites and a press box. The BJCC Arena Club is also located in the arena. It is a lounge that is limited to 500 guests and available for most arena events. Backstage there are 2 locker rooms and 6 dressing rooms as well as a press room and a VIP Reception area. The arena can accommodate 8 trucks backstage—3 on truck docks and room for 5 more. The arena's four-sided center-hung scoreboard, designed by Daktronics, measures 18' by 18' (5.5 x 5.5 m) on each side. Also on each side is a 7.5'-by-8'8" ProStar 16.5 mm video display.

== History ==
The arena opened in 1976 as part of the Birmingham–Jefferson Convention Complex.

The arena was home of the Birmingham Bulls of the WHA from 1976 to 1979; when the WHA folded, a minor league team with the same name called the arena home through 2001. It was there in December 1977 that hockey legend Gordie Howe, then playing for the WHA's New England Whalers, scored his 1,000th career goal at the age of 49; his Whalers defeated the Bulls 6–3. The arena was also the home of the UAB men's basketball team before it moved into Bartow Arena in 1988 and was home to the Alabama Steeldogs arena football team of the af2 from 2000 to 2007.

On December 17, 2014, the Civic Center board and officials of Legacy Credit Union announced a five-year, $2 million naming rights contract. Beginning January 1, 2015 the arena was officially renamed as Legacy Arena at the BJCC.

On October 24, 2018, the New Orleans Pelicans and the NBA G League announced that the Pelicans have acquired the right to own and operate an NBA G League team in Birmingham, Alabama. The team was expected to begin play in Birmingham by the 2022–23 basketball season playing at Legacy Arena following renovations to the arena. In the interim, the team began play for the 2018–19 season in Erie, Pennsylvania, as the Erie BayHawks, while the arena underwent a $123 million expansion and renovation. The renovations were completed in time for the 2021–22 season and the Pelicans chose to move the franchise, now known as the Birmingham Squadron, at that time.

== Notable events ==
=== Sports ===
==== Basketball ====
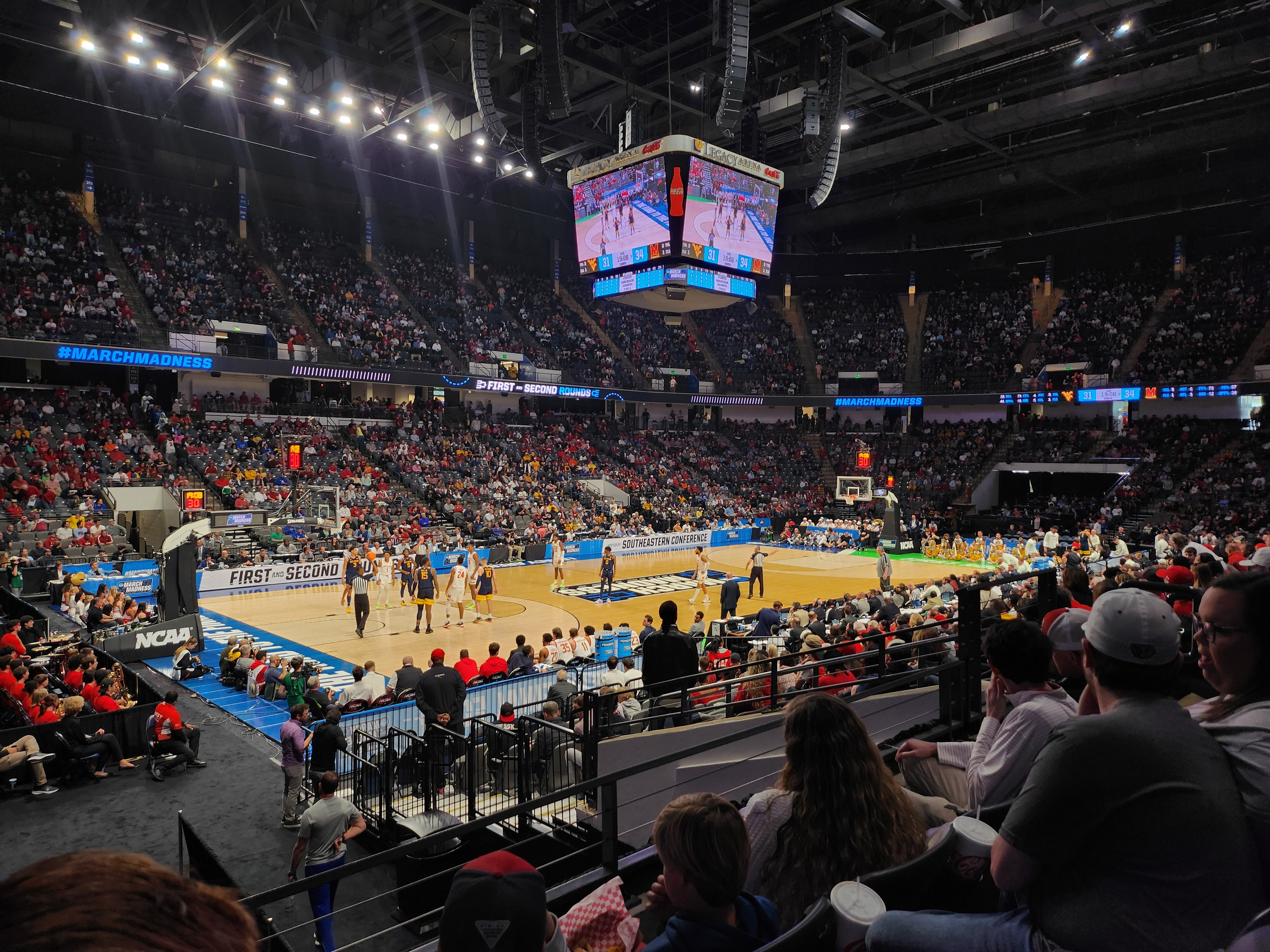
The 2023 NCAA men's basketball tournament at Legacy Arena

Legacy Arena has held many regular season men's and women's college basketball games as well as 11 NBA pre-season games. It has hosted the men's conference tournaments for the Southeastern Conference, Sun Belt Conference, Conference USA, and American Conference as well as the women's tournament for Conference USA and the American Conference. It has also hosted the NCAA men's college basketball tournament serving as first and second round host in 1984, 1987, 2000, 2003, 2008, and 2023 and as a regional site in 1982, 1985, 1988, 1995 and 1997. It was selected as a first and second round site for the 2028 men's tournament. Legacy Arena hosted the Sweet Sixteen and Elite Eight for the 2025 NCAA women's college basketball tournament. It also serves as the host for the Alabama High School Athletic Association basketball state finals each year.

===== Men's College Basketball conference tournaments at Legacy Arena =====
Year	Conference	Champion	Score	Runner-up	MVP
1979	SEC	Tennessee	75–69^{OT}	Kentucky	Kyle Macy, Kentucky
1980	SEC	LSU	80–78	Kentucky	DeWayne Scales, LSU
1981	SEC	Ole Miss	66–62	Georgia	Dominique Wilkins, Georgia
1982	Sun Belt	UAB	94–83	VCU	Oliver Robinson, UAB
1983	Sun Belt	UAB	64–47	South Florida	Cliff Pruitt, UAB
1983	SEC	Georgia	86–71	Alabama	Vern Fleming, Georgia
1984	Sun Belt	UAB	62–60	Old Dominion	McKinley Singleton, UAB
1985	SEC	Auburn	53–49^{OT}	Alabama	Chuck Person, Auburn
1986	Sun Belt	Jacksonville	70–69	UAB	Otis Smith, Jacksonville
1990	Sun Belt	South Florida	81–74	UNC Charlotte	Radenko Dobraš, South Florida
1992	SEC	Kentucky	80–54	Alabama	Jamal Mashburn, Kentucky
1999	C-USA	UNC Charlotte	68–59	Louisville	Galen Young, UNC Charlotte
2015	C-USA	UAB	73–60	Middle Tennessee	Robert Brown, UAB
2016	C-USA	Middle Tennessee	55–53	Old Dominion	Reggie Upshaw, Middle Tennessee
2017	C-USA	Middle Tennessee	83–72	Marshall	Giddy Potts, Middle Tennessee
2026	American	South Florida	70–55	Wichita State	Wes Enis, South Florida

===== Women's College Basketball conference tournaments at Legacy Arena =====
Year	Conference	Champion	Score	Runner-up	MVP
2015	C-USA	Western Kentucky	60–57	Southern Miss	Alexis Govan, Western Kentucky
2016	C-USA	Middle Tennessee	70–54	Old Dominion	Ty Petty, Middle Tennessee
2017	C-USA	Western Kentucky	67–56	Southern Miss	Kendall Noble, Western Kentucky
2026	American	UTSA	54–40	Rice	Cheyenne Rowe, UTSA

==== Tennis ====
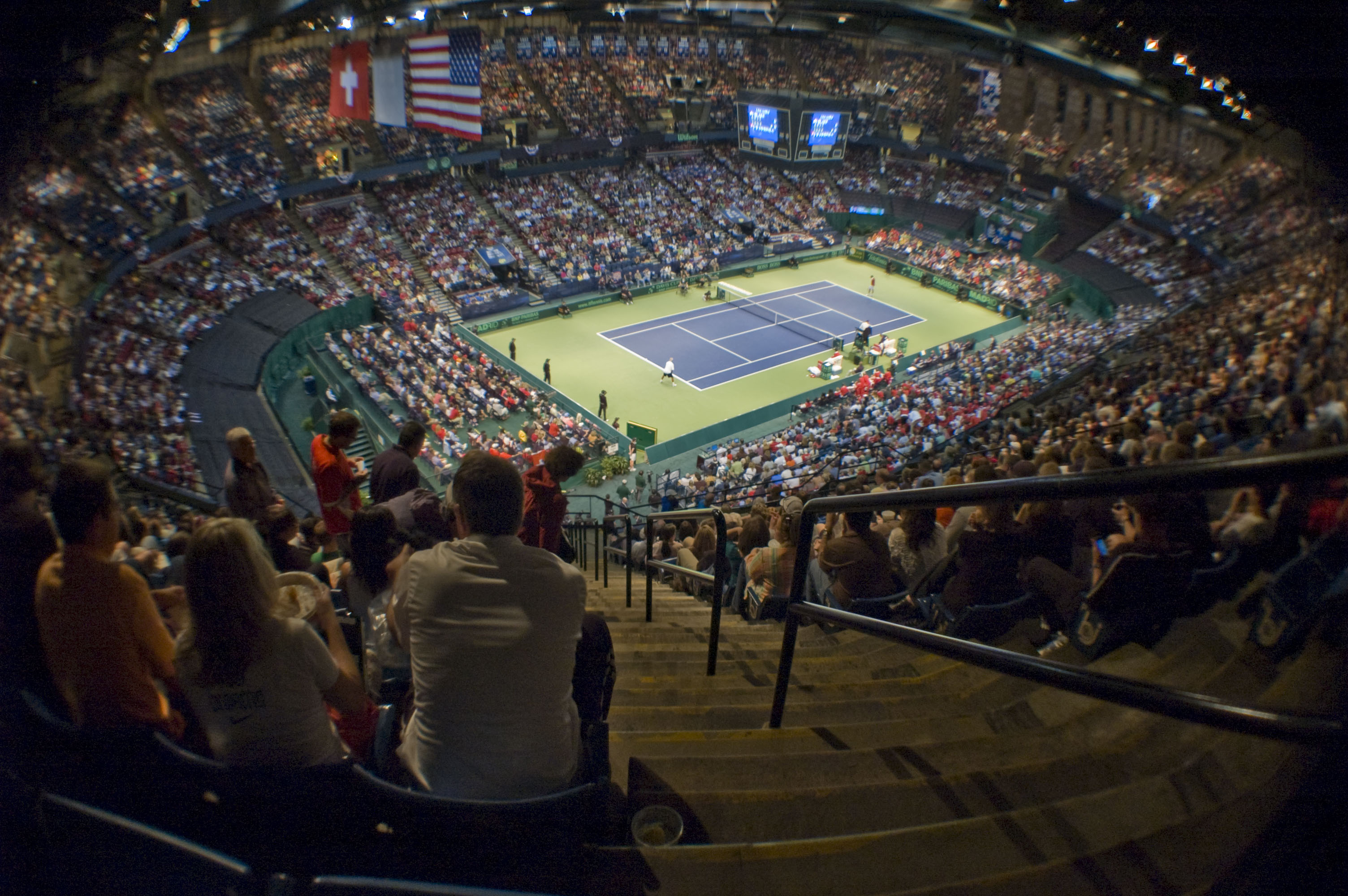
Interior of the arena during the 2009 Davis Cup

In 2009, the arena hosted the first round tie of the 2009 Davis Cup between the United States and Switzerland. Several tennis stars participated including Andy Roddick, James Blake, Bob and Mike Bryan and Stanislas Wawrinka. The arena also hosted the 2017 Davis Cup on February 3–5, 2017.

==== The World Games ====
Birmingham was the host city for the World Games 2022, with many events taking place in venues around the city. Legacy Arena hosted the Latin, standard, and rock'n'roll dancesport competitions as well as the aerobatic, acrobatic, rhythmic, trampoline and tumbling gymnastics competitions.

==== Professional wrestling ====
Legacy Arena has hosted professional wrestling events for several decades, with regular appearances from promotions including the WWE.

On December 10, 2000, the arena hosted Armageddon (2000), a pay-per-view event notable for featuring a six-man Hell in a Cell match for the WWF Championship. The event drew approximately 14,920 attendees.

== See also ==
- Birmingham–Jefferson Convention Complex
- 2025 SEC Gymnastics Championship
