= 1997 Sun Belt Conference men's basketball tournament =

- Classification: Division I
- Season: 1996–97
- Teams: 10
- Site: Barton Coliseum; Little Rock, AR
- Champions: South Alabama (3rd title)
- Winning coach: Bill Musselman (1st title)
- MVP: Rusty Yoder (South Alabama)

1996–97 Sun Belt Conference men's basketball standings
	Conf.				Overall
Team	W		L	PCT	W		L	PCT
New Orleans	14	–	4	.778	22	–	7	.759
South Alabama †	14	–	4	.778	23	–	7	.767
Arkansas–Little Rock	11	–	7	.611	18	–	11	.621
Lamar	10	–	8	.556	15	–	12	.556
Louisiana Tech	10	–	8	.556	15	–	14	.517
Western Kentucky	9	–	9	.500	12	–	15	.444
Southwestern Louisiana	9	–	9	.500	12	–	16	.429
Arkansas State	8	–	10	.444	15	–	12	.556
Jacksonville	4	–	14	.222	5	–	23	.179
Texas–Pan American	1	–	17	.056	3	–	25	.107
† 1997 Sun Belt Conference tournament winner Rankings from AP Poll

The 1997 Sun Belt Conference men's basketball tournament was held February 28–March 4 at Barton Coliseum in Little Rock, Arkansas.

South Alabama defeated Louisiana Tech in the championship game, 44–43, to win their third Sun Belt men's basketball tournament.

The Jaguars, in turn, received an automatic bid to the 1997 NCAA tournament. No other Sun Belt members were invited to the tournament.

== Format ==
No teams left or joined the Sun Belt before the season, leaving conference membership fixed at ten teams.

All teams participated in the tournament, maintaining its ten-team format. With all teams seeded based on regular-season conference records, the top six teams were all placed directly into the quarterfinal round while the four lowest-seeded teams were placed into the preliminary first round.

== Bracket ==
First round Friday, February 28
9	Jacksonville	101
8	Arkansas State	80
7	Southwestern Louisiana	56
10	Texas–Pan American	53

Quarterfinals; Saturday, March 1
1	New Orleans	76
9	Jacksonville	63
5	Louisiana Tech	64
4	Lamar	62
3	Arkansas–Little Rock	68
6	Western Kentucky	62
7	Southwestern Louisiana	39
2	South Alabama	66

Semifinals; Sunday, March 2
1	New Orleans	53
5	Louisiana Tech	59
3	Arkansas–Little Rock	52
2	South Alabama	71

Championship; Tuesday, March 4
5	Louisiana Tech	43
2	South Alabama	44

== See also ==
- Sun Belt Conference women's basketball tournament
