= 1985–86 UAB Blazers men's basketball team =

American college basketball season

1985–86 UAB Blazers men's basketball

NCAA tournament, Second Round
- Conference: Sun Belt Conference
- Record: 25–11 (9–5 Sun Belt)
- Head coach: Gene Bartow (8th season)
- Home arena: BJCC Coliseum

1985–86 Sun Belt Conference men's basketball standings
	Conf.				Overall
Team	W		L	PCT	W		L	PCT
Old Dominion	11	–	3	.786	23	–	8	.742
Western Kentucky	10	–	4	.714	23	–	8	.742
UAB	9	–	5	.643	25	–	11	.694
Jacksonville †	9	–	5	.643	21	–	10	.677
VCU	6	–	8	.429	12	–	16	.429
South Alabama	5	–	9	.357	16	–	16	.500
South Florida	5	–	9	.357	14	–	14	.500
UNC Charlotte	1	–	13	.071	8	–	20	.286
† 1986 Sun Belt Conference tournament winner Rankings from AP Poll

The 1985–86 UAB Blazers men's basketball team represented the University of Alabama at Birmingham as a member of the Sun Belt Conference during the 1985–86 NCAA Division I men's basketball season. This was head coach Gene Bartow's 8th season at UAB, and the Blazers played their home games at BJCC Coliseum. They finished the season 25–11, 9–5 in Sun Belt play and lost in the championship game of the Sun Belt tournament. They received an at-large bid to the NCAA tournament as No. 6 seed in the West region. The Blazers defeated Missouri in the opening round before falling to No. 3 seed North Carolina in the round of 32, 77–59.

== Roster ==
1985–86 UAB Blazers men's basketball team
Players
Coaches

Pos.	#	Name	Height	Weight	Year	Hometown
G	4	Tracy Foster	6 ft 4 in (1.93 m)	200 lb (91 kg)	Jr	Fort Wayne, Indiana
G	14	Steve Mitchell	6 ft 1 in (1.85 m)	185 lb (84 kg)	Sr	Memphis, Tennessee
G	21	Larry Wiksell	6 ft 0 in (1.83 m)	175 lb (79 kg)	Jr	Ventura, California
G	24	Michael Charles	6 ft 4 in (1.93 m)	180 lb (82 kg)	So	Birmingham, Alabama
G	25	Chris Thomas	6 ft 5 in (1.96 m)	205 lb (93 kg)	Fr	Alabaster, Alabama
C	31	Eddie Collins	6 ft 8 in (2.03 m)	220 lb (100 kg)	So	Marion Junction, Alabama
G	32	James Ponder	6 ft 1 in (1.85 m)	180 lb (82 kg)	Jr	Atlanta, Georgia
F	33	Reggie Turner	6 ft 8 in (2.03 m)	210 lb (95 kg)	Fr	Birmingham, Alabama
F	34	Dylan Howard	6 ft 6 in (1.98 m)	205 lb (93 kg)	Fr	Fort Wayne, Indiana
F	40	Jerome Mincy	6 ft 6 in (1.98 m)	225 lb (102 kg)	Sr	Memphis, Tennessee
F	44	Anthony Gordon	6 ft 7 in (2.01 m)	190 lb (86 kg)	Sr	Memphis, Tennessee
C	50	Archie Johnson	6 ft 8 in (2.03 m)	215 lb (98 kg)	So	Memphis, Tennessee
C	52	Cedric Evans	6 ft 9 in (2.06 m)	200 lb (91 kg)	So	Fort Pierce, Florida
F	55	Bruce Baker	6 ft 7 in (2.01 m)	205 lb (93 kg)	So	Benton, Illinois

Head coach

- Gene Bartow

Assistant coach(es)

Legend

- (C) Team captain
- (S) Suspended
- (I) Ineligible
- (W) Walk-on
- Injured
- Current redshirt

Roster

== Schedule and results ==
Date time, TV	Rank^{#}	Opponent^{#}	Result	Record	Site (attendance) city, state
Regular season
Nov 21, 1985*	No. 16	vs. Texas A&M; Preseason NIT	W 71–68	1–0	The Summit (1,250); Houston, Texas
Nov 24, 1985*	No. 16	vs. No. 6 Duke; Preseason NIT	L 54–66	1–1	The Summit (947); Houston, Texas
Nov 26, 1985*		Missouri Baptist	W 94–52	2–1	Birmingham-Jefferson Civic Center (10,053); Birmingham, Alabama
Dec 4, 1985*	No. 17	at ETSU	W 63–44	3–1	Freedom Hall Civic Center (4,775); Johnson City, Tennessee
Dec 6, 1985*	No. 17	vs. Lehigh; Amana-Hawkeye Classic	W 71–61	4–1	Carver-Hawkeye Arena (8,253); Iowa City, Iowa
Dec 7, 1985*	No. 17	vs. Arkansas State; Amana-Hawkeye Classic	W 78–59	5–1	Carver-Hawkeye Arena (10,942); Iowa City, Iowa
Dec 10, 1985*	No. 16	Auburn	W 62–56	6–1	Birmingham-Jefferson Civic Center (15,502); Birmingham, Alabama
Dec 13, 1985*		vs. Hawaii Pacific; Early Season Tournament	W 69–59	7–1	Neal S. Blaisdell Center (3,200); Honolulu, Hawaii
Dec 14, 1985*	No. 16	vs. Texas State; Early Season Tournament	W 65–56	8–1	Neal S. Blaisdell Center (2,543); Honolulu, Hawaii
Dec 17, 1985*	No. 14	Cincinnati	W 69–53	9–1	Birmingham-Jefferson Civic Center (5,871); Birmingham, Alabama
Dec 20, 1985*	No. 14	Campbell; UAB Classic	W 86–46	10–1	Birmingham-Jefferson Civic Center (5,269); Birmingham, Alabama
Dec 21, 1985*	No. 14	Chattanooga; UAB Classic	W 76–60	11–1	Birmingham-Jefferson Civic Center (6,207); Birmingham, Alabama
Dec 27, 1985*	No. 14	vs. TCU; UNLV Holiday Classic	W 69–62	12–1	Thomas & Mack Center (5,700); Las Vegas, Nevada
Dec 28, 1985*	No. 14	at No. 12 UNLV; UNLV Holiday Classic	L 72–73	12–2	Thomas & Mack Center (17,980); Las Vegas, Nevada
Jan 4, 1986	No. 16	Old Dominion	W 66–51	13–2 (1–0)	Birmingham-Jefferson Civic Center (10,497); Birmingham, Alabama
Jan 6, 1986	No. 14	at South Florida	W 57–46	14–2 (2–0)	Sun Dome (2,945); Tampa, Florida
Jan 9, 1986	No. 14	VCU	W 72–70 ^{OT}	15–2 (3–0)	Birmingham-Jefferson Civic Center (7,491); Birmingham, Alabama
Jan 13, 1986	No. 12	South Alabama	W 77–64	16–2 (4–0)	Birmingham-Jefferson Civic Center (5,719); Birmingham, Alabama
Jan 16, 1986	No. 12	Western Kentucky	L 72–75 ^{OT}	16–3 (4–1)	Birmingham-Jefferson Civic Center (10,071); Birmingham, Alabama
Jan 18, 1986*	No. 12	at DePaul	L 61–70	16–4	Rosemont Horizon (12,591); Rosemont, Illinois
Jan 21, 1986	No. 18	at Jacksonville	W 75–67	17–4 (5–1)	Jacksonville Memorial Coliseum (6,078); Jacksonville, Florida
Jan 23, 1986	No. 18	UNC Charlotte	W 81–63	18–4 (6–1)	Birmingham-Jefferson Civic Center (7,717); Birmingham, Alabama
Jan 25, 1986	No. 18	at Western Kentucky	L 75–81	18–5 (6–2)	E. A. Diddle Arena (13,300); Bowling Green, Kentucky
Jan 27, 1986		South Florida	W 71–56	19–5 (7–2)	Birmingham-Jefferson Civic Center (8,091); Birmingham, Alabama
Jan 30, 1986		at Old Dominion	W 71–58	20–5 (8–2)	Norfolk Scope (7,214); Norfolk, Virginia
Feb 1, 1986		Jacksonville	L 60–65	20–6 (8–3)	Birmingham-Jefferson Civic Center (12,167); Birmingham, Alabama
Feb 6, 1986		at VCU	L 57–63	20–7 (8–4)	Richmond Coliseum (7,152); Richmond, Virginia
Feb 8, 1986*		South Carolina	W 83–54	21–7	Birmingham-Jefferson Civic Center (6,251); Birmingham, Alabama
Feb 15, 1986		at South Alabama	L 46–48	21–8 (8–5)	Jaguar Gym (4,259); Mobile, Alabama
Feb 17, 1986		at UNC Charlotte	W 70–54	22–8 (9–5)	Charlotte Coliseum (6,507); Charlotte, North Carolina
Feb 22, 1986*		at No. 7 Michigan	L 54–62	22–9	Crisler Arena (13,609); Ann Arbor, Michigan
Sun Belt tournament
Feb 27, 1986*	(3)	(6) South Alabama; Quarterfinals	W 64–51	23–9	Birmingham-Jefferson Civic Center (6,802); Birmingham, Alabama
Feb 28, 1986*	(3)	(2) Western Kentucky; Semifinals	W 57–45	24–9	Birmingham-Jefferson Civic Center (8,011); Birmingham, Alabama
Mar 1, 1986*	(3)	(4) Jacksonville; Championship game	L 69–70	24–10	Birmingham-Jefferson Civic Center (8,715); Birmingham, Alabama
NCAA tournament
Mar 13, 1986*	(6 W)	vs. (11 W) Missouri; First Round	W 66–64	25–10	Dee Events Center (11,298); Ogden, Utah
Mar 15, 1986*	(6 W)	vs. (3 W) No. 8 North Carolina; Second Round	L 59–77	25–11	Dee Events Center (11,234); Ogden, Utah
*Non-conference game. ^{#}Rankings from AP poll. (#) Tournament seedings in parentheses. W=West. All times are in Central Time.

== NBA draft ==
Round	Pick	Player	NBA club
2	36	Steve Mitchell	Washington Bullets
