= 1996–97 South Alabama Jaguars basketball team =

American college basketball season

1996–97 South Alabama Jaguars men's basketball

Sun Belt Regular season co-champions Sun Belt tournament champions

NCAA tournament, first round
- Conference: Sun Belt Conference
- Record: 23–7 (14–4 Sun Belt)
- Head coach: Bill Musselman (2nd season)
- Home arena: Mitchell Center

1996–97 Sun Belt Conference men's basketball standings
	Conf.				Overall
Team	W		L	PCT	W		L	PCT
New Orleans	14	–	4	.778	22	–	7	.759
South Alabama †	14	–	4	.778	23	–	7	.767
Arkansas–Little Rock	11	–	7	.611	18	–	11	.621
Lamar	10	–	8	.556	15	–	12	.556
Louisiana Tech	10	–	8	.556	15	–	14	.517
Western Kentucky	9	–	9	.500	12	–	15	.444
Southwestern Louisiana	9	–	9	.500	12	–	16	.429
Arkansas State	8	–	10	.444	15	–	12	.556
Jacksonville	4	–	14	.222	5	–	23	.179
Texas–Pan American	1	–	17	.056	3	–	25	.107
† 1997 Sun Belt Conference tournament winner Rankings from AP Poll

The 1996–97 South Alabama Jaguars basketball team represented the University of South Alabama as members of the Sun Belt Conference during the 1996–97 NCAA Division I men's basketball season. The Jaguars were led by head coach Bill Musselman and played their home games at the Mitchell Center. They finished the season 23–7, 14–4 in Sun Belt play to finish in first place. They won the Sun Belt tournament to earn an automatic bid to the 1997 NCAA tournament as the 13 seed in the Southeast region. In the opening round, the Jaguars lost to eventual National champion Arizona.

== Roster ==
1996–97 South Alabama Jaguars men's basketball team
Players	Coaches
Pos. / # / Name / Height / Weight / Year / Hometown; G / 5 / Rusty Yoder / 6 ft 1 in (1.85 m) / — / Jr	Head coach: Bill Musselman (Wittenberg); Assistant coach(es) Legend: (C) Team captain; (S) Suspended; (I) Ineligible; (W) Walk-on; Injured; Current redshirt

== Schedule and results ==
Date time, TV	Rank^{#}	Opponent^{#}	Result	Record	Site (attendance) city, state
Regular season
Nov 23, 1996*		Abilene Christian	W 85–62	1–0	Jaguar Gym; Mobile, Alabama
Nov 26, 1996*		West Florida	W 86–60	2–0	Jaguar Gym; Mobile, Alabama
Nov 29, 1996*		Grambling	W 57–54	3–0	Jaguar Gym; Mobile, Alabama
Dec 3, 1996*		at Southern Miss	L 36–55	3–1	Reed Green Coliseum; Hattiesburg, Mississippi
Dec 7, 1996*		Florida A&M	W 81–53	4–1	Jaguar Gym; Mobile, Alabama
Dec 10, 1996*		UAB	W 74–63 ^{OT}	5–1	Jaguar Gym; Mobile, Alabama
Dec 18, 1996*		at Auburn	L 51–60	5–2	Beard-Eaves-Memorial Coliseum; Auburn, Alabama
Dec 21, 1996*		Nicholls State	W 69–66	6–2	Jaguar Gym; Mobile, Alabama
Dec 28, 1996		Southwestern Louisiana	L 63–66	6–3 (0–1)	Jaguar Gym; Mobile, Alabama
Jan 2, 1997*		Arkansas–Little Rock	W 64–56	7–3 (1–1)	Jaguar Gym; Mobile, Alabama
Jan 4, 1997		Arkansas State	W 72–53	8–3 (2–1)	Jaguar Gym; Mobile, Alabama
Jan 9, 1997		Texas-Rio Grande Valley	W 72–58	9–3 (3–1)	Jaguar Gym; Mobile, Alabama
Jan 11, 1997		at Lamar	W 84–62	10–3 (4–1)	Montagne Center; Beaumont, Texas
Jan 13, 1997		at Jacksonville	W 77–45	11–3 (5–1)	Jacksonville Memorial Coliseum; Jacksonville, Florida
Jan 18, 1997		at Western Kentucky	W 68–66	12–3 (6–1)	E.A. Diddle Arena; Bowling Green, Kentucky
Jan 20, 1997		New Orleans	W 65–52	13–3 (7–1)	Jaguar Gym; Mobile, Alabama
Jan 23, 1997		at Arkansas–Little Rock	L 47–48	13–4 (7–2)	Barton Coliseum; Little Rock, Arkansas
Jan 25, 1997		at Arkansas State	W 79–68	14–4 (8–2)	Convocation Center; Jonesboro, Arkansas
Jan 30, 1997		at New Orleans	L 51–58	14–5 (8–3)	Lakefront Arena; New Orleans, Louisiana
Feb 1, 1997		at Texas-Rio Grande Valley	W 65–51	15–5 (9–3)	UTPA Fieldhouse; Edinburg, Texas
Feb 3, 1997		Louisiana Tech	W 56–50	16–5 (10–3)	Jaguar Gym; Mobile, Alabama
Feb 13, 1997		Lamar	W 66–53	17–5 (11–3)	Jaguar Gym; Mobile, Alabama
Feb 15, 1997		Jacksonville	W 92–74	18–5 (12–3)	Jaguar Gym; Mobile, Alabama
Feb 20, 1997		at Louisiana Tech	W 44–43	19–5 (13–3)	Thomas Assembly Center; Ruston, Louisiana
Feb 22, 1997		Western Kentucky	W 83–59	20–5 (14–3)	Jaguar Gym; Mobile, Alabama
Feb 24, 1997		at Southwestern Louisiana	L 62–65	20–6 (14–4)	Cajundome; Lafayette, Louisiana
Sun Belt Conference tournament
Mar 1, 1997*	(2)	vs. (7) Southwestern Louisiana; Quarterfinals	W 66–39	21–6	Barton Coliseum; Little Rock, Arkansas
Mar 2, 1997*	(2)	at (3) Arkansas–Little Rock; Semifinals	W 71–52	22–6	Barton Coliseum; Little Rock, Arkansas
Mar 4, 1997*	(2)	vs. (5) Louisiana Tech; Championship game	W 44–43	23–6	Barton Coliseum; Little Rock, Arkansas
NCAA tournament
Mar 13, 1997*	(13 SE)	vs. (4 SE) No. 15 Arizona; First round	L 57–65	23–7	The Pyramid; Memphis, Tennessee
*Non-conference game. ^{#}Rankings from AP Poll. (#) Tournament seedings in parentheses. W=West. All times are in Central Time.
