= 1985–86 Jacksonville Dolphins men's basketball team =

American college basketball season

1985–86 Jacksonville Dolphins men's basketball

Sun Belt tournament champions

NCAA tournament
- Conference: Sun Belt Conference
- Record: 21–10 (9–5 Sun Belt)
- Head coach: Bob Wenzel (5th season)
- Assistant coaches: Rich Haddad; Kevin Moran
- Home arena: Jacksonville Memorial Coliseum

1985–86 Sun Belt Conference men's basketball standings
	Conf.				Overall
Team	W		L	PCT	W		L	PCT
Old Dominion	11	–	3	.786	23	–	8	.742
Western Kentucky	10	–	4	.714	23	–	8	.742
UAB	9	–	5	.643	25	–	11	.694
Jacksonville †	9	–	5	.643	21	–	10	.677
VCU	6	–	8	.429	12	–	16	.429
South Alabama	5	–	9	.357	16	–	16	.500
South Florida	5	–	9	.357	14	–	14	.500
UNC Charlotte	1	–	13	.071	8	–	20	.286
† 1986 Sun Belt Conference tournament winner Rankings from AP Poll

The 1985–86 Jacksonville Dolphins men's basketball team represented Jacksonville University as members of the Sun Belt Conference during the 1985–86 NCAA Division I men's basketball season. The Dolphins, led by 5th-year head coach Bob Wenzel, played their home games at Jacksonville Memorial Coliseum in Jacksonville, Florida.

After finishing third in the Sun Belt regular season standings, Jacksonville won the conference tournament to receive an automatic bid to the NCAA tournament as No. 8 seed in the Midwest region. The team was beaten by No. 9 seed Temple, 61–50 in OT, in the opening round to end the season 21–10 (9–5 Sun Belt). To date, this season marks the school's most recent appearance in the NCAA Tournament.

== Roster ==
1985–86 Jacksonville Dolphins men's basketball team
Players
Coaches

Pos.	#	Name	Height	Weight	Year	Previous school	Hometown
G/F	32	Otis Smith	6 ft 5 in (1.96 m)	—	Sr	Nathan Bedford Forrest HS	Jacksonville, FL
G	34	Ronnie Murphy	6 ft 5 in (1.96 m)	—	Jr	Oviedo HS	Jacksonville, FL
F		Willie McDuffie	6 ft 7 in (2.01 m)	—
F		Danny Pearson	6 ft 6 in (1.98 m)	—	Jr

Head coach

- Bob Wenzel (Rutgers)

Assistant coach(es)

Legend

- (C) Team captain
- (S) Suspended
- (I) Ineligible
- (W) Walk-on
- Injured
- Current redshirt

Roster

== Schedule and results ==
Date time, TV	Rank^{#}	Opponent^{#}	Result	Record	Site (attendance) city, state
Non-conference regular season
Nov 23, 1985*		at Southwestern Louisiana	W 80–66	1–0	Cajundome; Lafayette, Louisiana
Nov 30, 1985*		Eckerd	W 83–69	2–0	Jacksonville Memorial Coliseum; Jacksonville, Florida
Dec 3, 1985*		Francis Marion	W 69–60	3–0	Jacksonville Memorial Coliseum; Jacksonville, Florida
Dec 7, 1985*		at George Washington	L 77–83	3–1	Charles E. Smith Center; Washington, D.C.
Dec 14, 1985*		UCF	W 67–47	4–1	Jacksonville Memorial Coliseum; Jacksonville, Florida
Dec 17, 1985*		No. 1 North Carolina	L 65–69	4–2	Jacksonville Memorial Coliseum; Jacksonville, Florida
Dec 20, 1985*		Southern Miss; Gator Bowl Tournament	W 80–66	5–2	Jacksonville Memorial Coliseum; Jacksonville, Florida
Dec 21, 1985*		No. 7 Georgia Tech; Gator Bowl Tournament	L 53–72	5–3	Jacksonville Memorial Coliseum; Jacksonville, Florida
Dec 27, 1985*		vs. Washington; Tulsa Tournament	W 67–65	6–3	Tulsa Convention Center; Tulsa, Oklahoma
Dec 28, 1985*		at Tulsa; Tulsa Tournament	L 57–67	6–4	Tulsa Convention Center; Tulsa, Oklahoma
Jan 2, 1986*		Bethune-Cookman	W 103–54	7–4	Jacksonville Memorial Coliseum; Jacksonville, Florida
Jan 4, 1986*		at Florida State	W 69–62	8–4	Donald L. Tucker Center; Tallahassee, Florida
Jan 6, 1986*		Southwestern Louisiana	W 55–51	9–4	Jacksonville Memorial Coliseum; Jacksonville, Florida
Sun Belt Conference regular season
Jan 11, 1986		UNC Charlotte	W 86–77	10–4 (1–0)	Jacksonville Memorial Coliseum; Jacksonville, Florida
Jan 16, 1986		at South Alabama	L 53–57	10–5 (1–1)	Jaguar Gym; Mobile, Alabama
Jan 18, 1986		at UNC Charlotte	W 67–58	11–5 (2–1)	Charlotte Coliseum; Charlotte, North Carolina
Jan 21, 1986		No. 18 UAB	L 67–75	11–6 (2–2)	Jacksonville Memorial Coliseum (6,078); Jacksonville, Florida
Jan 23, 1986		at VCU	L 80–81	11–7 (2–3)	Richmond Coliseum; Richmond, Virginia
Jan 25, 1986		at Old Dominion	L 56–64	11–8 (2–4)	Norfolk Scope; Norfolk, Virginia
Jan 27, 1986		South Alabama	W 64–61	12–8 (3–4)	Jacksonville Memorial Coliseum; Jacksonville, Florida
Feb 1, 1986		at UAB	W 65–60	13–8 (4–4)	Birmingham-Jefferson Civic Center (12,167); Birmingham, Alabama
Feb 3, 1986		at No. 19 Western Kentucky	L 46–51	13–9 (4–5)	E.A. Diddle Arena; Bowling Green, Kentucky
Feb 8, 1986		at South Florida	W 62–54	14–9 (5–5)	Sun Dome; Tampa, Florida
Feb 10, 1986		Western Kentucky	W 70–65	15–9 (6–5)	Jacksonville Memorial Coliseum; Jacksonville, Florida
Feb 15, 1986		Old Dominion	W 69–51	16–9 (7–5)	Jacksonville Memorial Coliseum; Jacksonville, Florida
Feb 17, 1986		VCU	W 67–58	17–9 (8–5)	Jacksonville Memorial Coliseum; Jacksonville, Florida
Feb 22, 1986		South Florida	W 62–45	18–9 (9–5)	Jacksonville Memorial Coliseum; Jacksonville, Florida
Sun Belt Conference tournament
Feb 27, 1986*	(4)	vs. VCU; Quarterfinals	W 56–49	19–9	Birmingham-Jefferson Civic Center; Birmingham, Alabama
Feb 28, 1986*	(4)	vs. (1) Old Dominion; Semifinals	W 67–61	20–9	Birmingham-Jefferson Civic Center; Birmingham, Alabama
Mar 1, 1986*	(4)	at (3) UAB; Championship game	W 70–69	21–9	Birmingham-Jefferson Civic Center (8,715); Birmingham, Alabama
NCAA tournament
Mar 13, 1986*	(8 MW)	vs. (9 MW) Temple; First Round	L 50–61 ^{OT}	21–10	University of Dayton Arena; Dayton, Ohio
*Non-conference game. ^{#}Rankings from AP Poll. (#) Tournament seedings in parentheses. All times are in Eastern.
