= Belk Gymnasium =

Gymnasium in North Carolina, USA

Coordinates: 35.305370°N 80.735622°W

- The Mine Shaft
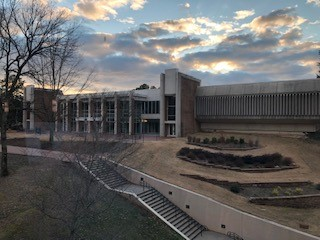
- Belk Gym post-renovation
- Interactive map of Belk Gymnasium
- Location: UNC Charlotte; Charlotte, North Carolina 28223
- Owner: University of North Carolina at Charlotte
- Operator: University of North Carolina at Charlotte
- Capacity: 3,000

Construction
- Groundbreaking: 1968
- Opened: 1970
- Closed: 1996 (for intercollegiate events)

Tenants
- Charlotte 49ers (men) (NCAA) (1970–1976); Charlotte 49ers (women) (NCAA) (1975–1996)

Belk Gymnasium, known informally as The Mine Shaft, is a gymnasium on the campus of the University of North Carolina at Charlotte in Charlotte, North Carolina. Completed in 1970, it was the first on-campus home of the Charlotte 49ers basketball team.

== History ==
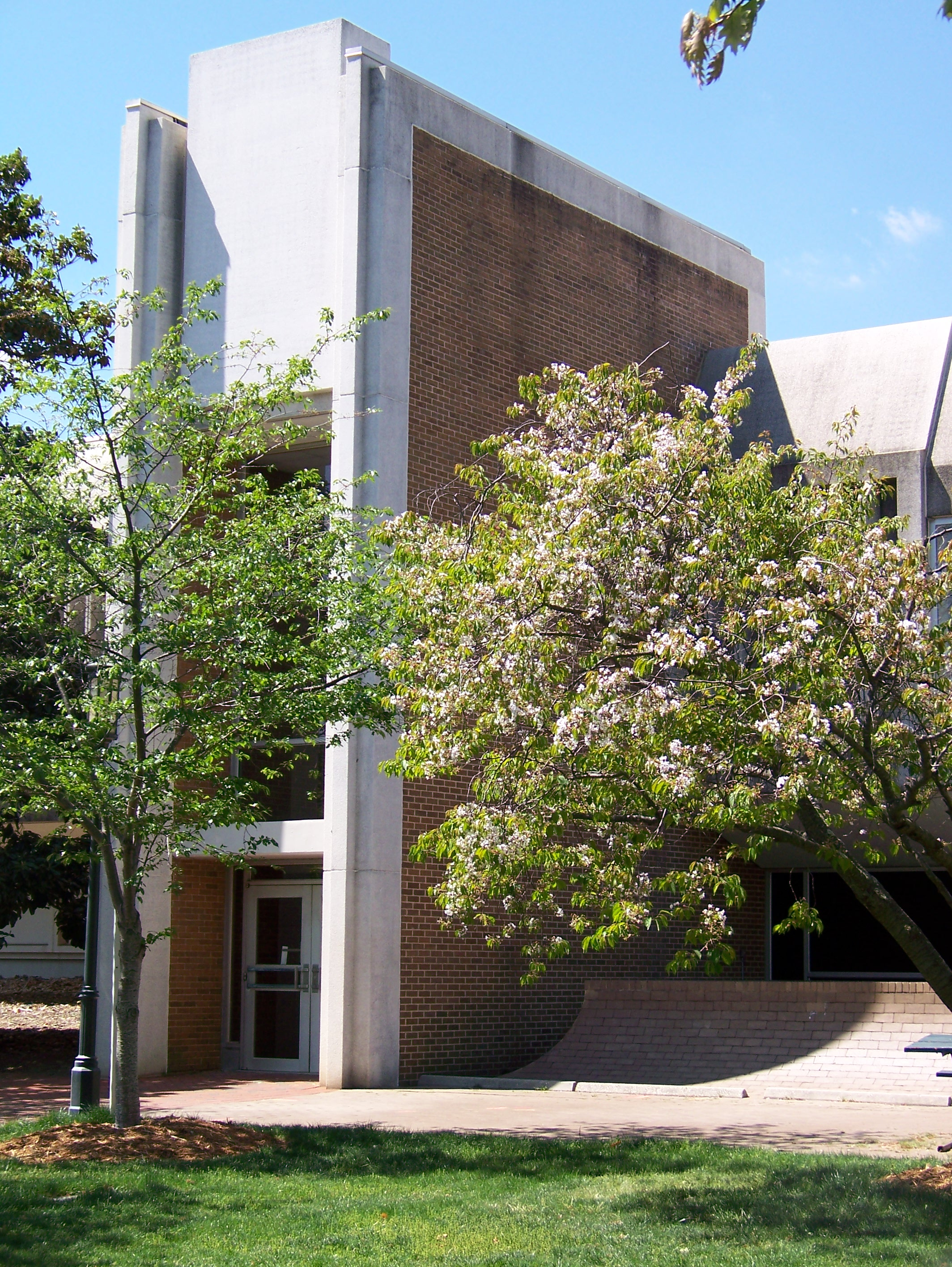
Belk Gym entrance

Before Belk Gym was built, UNC Charlotte's basketball team (then a member of the NAIA) played at various high school gyms in the greater Charlotte area. As the full-time home of the 49ers from 1970 through 1976, the team enjoyed a tremendous home-court advantage, going undefeated at home in 1974, 1975, and 1976. When Charlotte joined the Sun Belt Conference for the 1976–77 season, Belk's seating capacity (approximately 3,000) was too small for the conference's standards; as a result, the team moved its conference home games to the original Charlotte Coliseum.

From 1976 until the opening of Dale F. Halton Arena in 1996, the 49ers' women's basketball team and volleyball team played in the Mine Shaft; the men's basketball team played lower-profile non-league games in the gym during that time period - at least one each season.

== Today ==
With the opening of Halton Arena, Belk Gym was no longer needed as a host for intercollegiate activities. Its bleachers were removed in 2000, and the main floor was removed in 2003; at that time, the overhead scoreboard was also removed. The facility now houses the Department of Kinesiology for UNC Charlotte.

The gym is still an integral part of UNC Charlotte's recreation and classroom usage. The second-floor houses RM 229, nicknamed "The Stadium" by students because of its old school stadium-style seats and elevated floor. Belk went through renovations which started in 2014, including a refreshed facade and interior renovation that added new classroom space as part of UNC Charlotte's 2010 Master Plan. This allowed for the Kinesiology program to expand beyond its previous capabilities. The renovation was completed near the end of 2015. Recreational Services offices, which used to be housed in Belk Gym, were moved in 2020 to the newly built University Recreation Center after its completion.

The facility also houses the Roy R. Fielding Aquatic Center, featuring a 13 foot deep 25 meter by 25 yard pool, available for aquatic club services. The facility was named in honor of the former Charlotte men's and women's swimming and diving coach who died in 2020.
