= Birmingham–Jefferson Convention Complex =

Architectural structure

Coordinates: 33.524°N 86.812°W

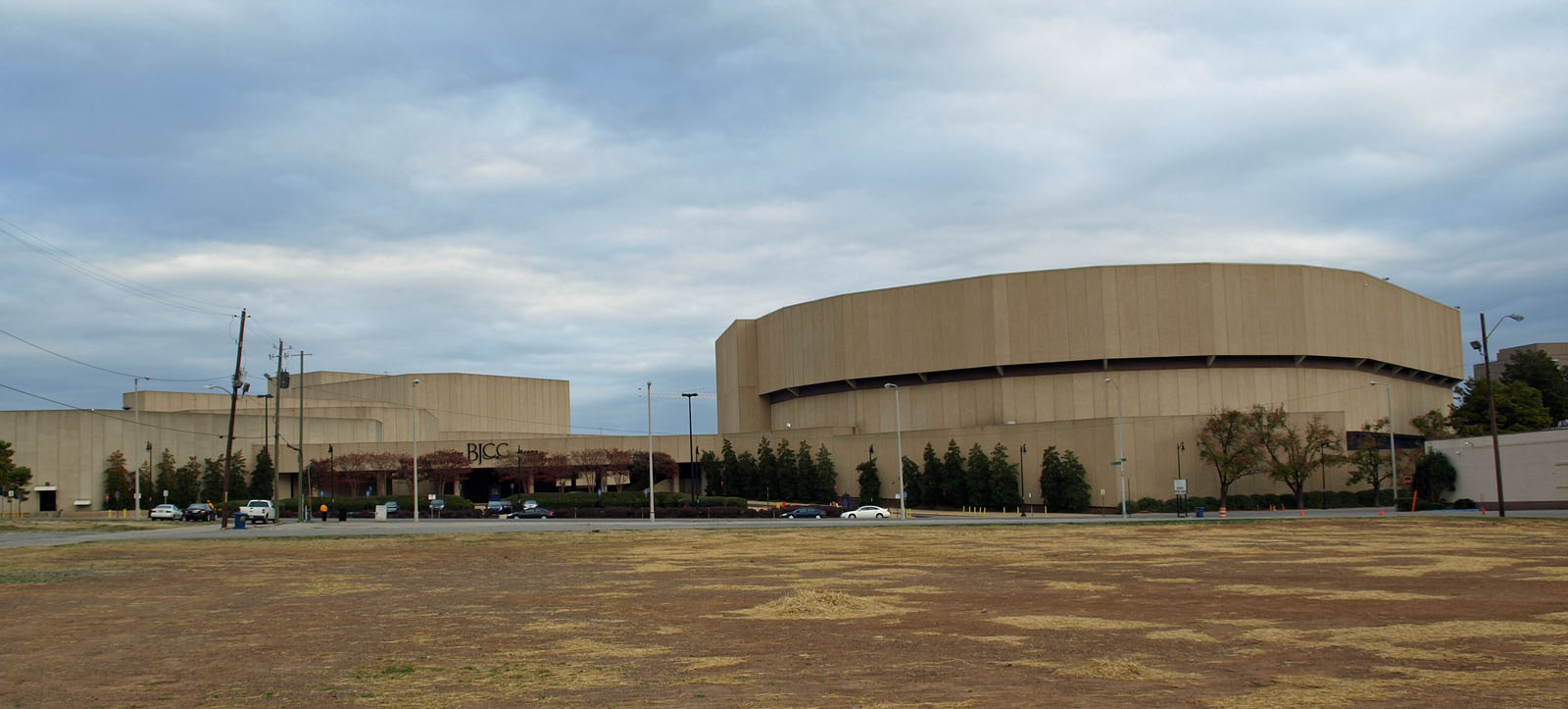
- Exterior view of the complex (c.2011)
- Former names: Birmingham–Jefferson Civic Center (1976–98)
- Address: 2100 Richard Arrington Jr. Blvd N Birmingham, AL 35203-1102
- Location: Druid Hills
- Owner: Birmingham-Jefferson Civic Center Authority
- Operator: Birmingham-Jefferson Civic Center Authority

Construction
- Opened: January 1972
- Renovated: 2009, 2019–2021
- Expanded: 2019–2021
- Cost: $104 million ($913 million in 2025 dollars)

Website
- Venue Website

The Birmingham–Jefferson Convention Complex (formerly known as Birmingham-Jefferson Civic Center) is an entertainment, sports, and convention complex located in the heart of Birmingham, Alabama's Uptown Entertainment District. The Sheraton Birmingham and Westin Birmingham are located on the campus adjoining the convention center. Alongside over 220,000 square feet of exhibit halls, meeting space, and ballrooms, the complex features four entertainment venues: a stadium, an arena, concert hall, and theatre.

== Design and architecture ==
The Birmingham–Jefferson Civic Center was designed by Geddes Brecher Qualls Cunningham, the winner of what was, at the time, the largest open architectural competition ever organized by the American Institute of Architects. The original facility was built between 1974 and 1976 for approximately US$104 million. A.G. Gaston Construction Company, Inc. served as contractors.

A critical component of the competition program was making a viable connection across the elevated I-59/I-20 highway from the Civic Center facility to the existing administrative and cultural facilities surrounding Linn Park to the south. For several decades after the complex opened, this problem was not addressed. A proposal to create a park underneath the elevated highway was part of the expansion of the complex.

Multiple plans to expand the complex were presented before the final proposal was approved. An attempt by former Birmingham mayor Larry Langford to build a large domed stadium was unsuccessful. The BJCC authority purchased several parcels of land required for that expansion, but as of 2013, the project did not have major financial backing and lacked a clear design. Former Birmingham Mayor William Bell expressed some interest in building a domed stadium, but on a smaller scale. The Alabama Department of Transportation began a project to replace the aging I-20/59 elevated viaduct adjacent to the complex, involving the reuse of some right-of-way to improve interstate ramps, which was expected to temporarily interfere with plans to build a multipurpose stadium at the complex's current site. In 2013, the new viaduct was expected to be completed and reopened to traffic by January 2020; work began in 2015 and on January 17, 2020, it was announced that the highway would reopen by January 21.

== Venues ==
=== Arena ===
Legacy Arena (formerly known as the BJCC Coliseum until February 1999 and the BJCC Arena until December 2014), seats 17,654 for sporting events, 19,000 for concerts and 8,000 in a theater setting. It has been the home to ice hockey, college basketball and arena football teams in Birmingham.

It was home of the Birmingham Bulls of the WHA from 1976 to 1978 and another version of the Birmingham Bulls of the ECHL from 1992 to 2001. It was also home to the UAB men's basketball team starting in 1978 before the team moved into Bartow Arena in 1988. The Alabama Steeldogs, an af2 team, played in the arena from 2000 to 2007.

It was the home of the Birmingham Squadron in the NBA G League from 2021 to 2026.

In 2009 and 2017, the arena hosted Davis Cup tennis matches.

The arena has hosted major concert tours, Disney on Ice, American Idol Live!, the PBR Unleash the Beast Series, Monster Jam, Ringling Bros. and Barnum & Bailey Circus, WWE, and other events including trade shows.

In 2023, the arena hosted the 1st and 2nd rounds of the NCAA March Madness Men's tournament.

=== Stadium ===
Construction of a new football stadium, located just east of the main complex, began on July 25, 2019 with grading work. A ceremonial groundbreaking had been held on December 13, 2018. During construction, the venue was named Protective Stadium via a sponsorship deal with the Birmingham-based Protective Life insurance company. The 47,100-seat facility opened on October 2, 2021 as the new home of UAB Blazers football, with UAB's first game being a 36–12 loss to Liberty. It served as the site of the opening and closing ceremonies of the 2022 World Games. On June 4, 2022, country superstar Garth Brooks performed at the first concert ever held at the stadium.

=== Concert Hall ===
The 2,835-seat BJCC Concert Hall was the home of the Alabama Symphony Orchestra before moving to UAB's state of the art Alys Stephens Center. Concerts and touring Broadway and family shows are also held here. It features an 84-foot (26 m)-by-88-foot (25.5-x-27-m) stage with a 24-foot-(7.3 m)-tall proscenium. Its grid height of 105 feet (32 m) makes the concert hall the tallest building in the complex. There is also a pipe organ at the Concert Hall, and backstage there are 2 chorus rooms and 12 dressing rooms, as well as two rehearsal areas and a VIP Reception Room.

=== Theatre ===
The 1,000-seat BJCC Theatre is used for operas, ballets, and smaller concerts and stage shows, and is also home to the Birmingham Children's Theatre, the nation's largest children's theater. The theatre contains a 46-by-70-foot (14-by-21-meter) stage and a grid height of 58 feet (17.5 m). There are 2 rehearsal areas, 2 chorus dressing rooms and 6 dressing rooms, including a star's dressing room.

== Exhibition Halls ==
The 220,000-square-foot (20,000 m^{2}) Exhibition Halls are used for Birmingham's largest trade shows and conventions. They are divisible into three smaller halls and can accommodate 1100 exhibit booths.

== Other facilities ==
The complex contains 64 meeting rooms totaling 100,000 square feet (9,300 m^{2}) of meeting space, including a 16,000-square-foot (1,500 m^{2}) ballroom that can seat up to 1,200 for banquets. The ten-story Medical Forum, with meeting space, a 275-seat theater, classrooms, conference space, and offices, is also located here. The adjacent 838-room Sheraton Birmingham Hotel provides a large ballroom and other convention and meeting facilities nearby. The 294-room Westin Birmingham Hotel within the Uptown Entertainment District provides more than 7,000 square feet of flexible meeting space and an additional 2,500 square feet of pre-function space.

== See also ==
- List of concert halls
- List of convention centers in the United States
