= 1981–82 Houston Cougars men's basketball team =

American college basketball season

1981–82 Houston Cougars men's basketball
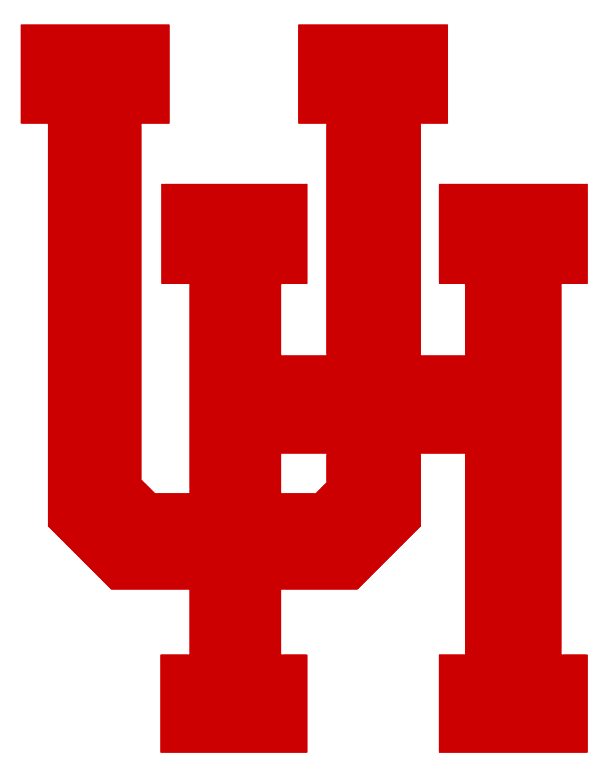

NCAA tournament, Final Four
- Conference: Southwest Conference
- Record: 25–8 (11–5 SWC)
- Head coach: Guy Lewis (26th season)
- Assistant coaches: Terry Kirkpatrick; Don Schverak
- Home arena: Hofheinz Pavilion

1981–82 Southwest Conference men's basketball standings
	Conf.				Overall
Team	W		L	PCT	W		L	PCT
No. 12 Arkansas †	12	–	4	.750	23	–	6	.793
Houston	11	–	5	.688	25	–	8	.758
Texas A&M	10	–	6	.625	20	–	11	.645
Baylor	9	–	7	.563	17	–	11	.607
TCU	9	–	7	.563	16	–	13	.552
Texas Tech	8	–	8	.500	17	–	11	.607
Texas	6	–	10	.375	16	–	10	.615
Rice	6	–	10	.375	15	–	15	.500
SMU	1	–	15	.063	6	–	21	.222
† 1982 SWC tournament winner Rankings from AP poll

The 1981–82 Houston Cougars men's basketball team represented the University of Houston in NCAA Division I competition in the 1981–82 season. This was the first of Houston's famous Phi Slama Jama teams, led by Rob Williams, Michael Young, Larry Micheaux, and future Hall of Famer Clyde Drexler. Another future Hall of Famer, Akeem Olajuwon, played sparingly off the bench that season.

Houston, coached by Guy Lewis, played its home games in the Hofheinz Pavilion in Houston, Texas, and was then a member of the Southwest Conference.

== Roster ==
1981–82 Houston Cougars men's basketball team
Players
Coaches

Pos.	#	Name	Height	Weight	Year	Previous school	Hometown
G/F	32	Benny Anders	6 ft 5 in (1.96 m)	188 lb (85 kg)	Fr	Bernice HS	Bernice, LA
C	50	Dan Bunce	7 ft 0 in (2.13 m)	235 lb (107 kg)	So	Conroe HS	Conroe, TX
C	52	David Bunce	6 ft 11 in (2.11 m)	225 lb (102 kg)	Jr	Conroe HS	Conroe, TX
G	12	Eric Davis	6 ft 2 in (1.88 m)	180 lb (82 kg)	Sr	Senn HS	Chicago, IL
G	14	Eric Dickens	6 ft 1 in (1.85 m)	168 lb (76 kg)	Fr	Madison HS	Houston, TX
F	22	Clyde Drexler	6 ft 6 in (1.98 m)	205 lb (93 kg)	So	Sterling HS	Houston, TX
G/F	44	Reid Gettys	6 ft 6 in (1.98 m)	190 lb (86 kg)	Fr	Memorial HS	Houston, TX
F/C	40	Larry Micheaux	6 ft 9 in (2.06 m)	220 lb (100 kg)	Jr	Worthing HS	Houston, TX
C	34	Akeem Olajuwon	7 ft 0 in (2.13 m)	235 lb (107 kg)	Fr	Muslim Teachers College	Lagos, Nigeria
F	30	Gary Orsak	6 ft 7 in (2.01 m)	200 lb (91 kg)	Fr	Alvin HS	Alvin, TX
G	10	Rodney Parker	6 ft 0 in (1.83 m)	200 lb (91 kg)	Sr	Davis HS	Houston, TX
G	24	Dave Rose	6 ft 3 in (1.91 m)	185 lb (84 kg)	Jr	Dixie College	Houston, TX
G	00	Lynden Rose	6 ft 3 in (1.91 m)	175 lb (79 kg)	Sr	Springs HS	Nassau, Bahamas
F	54	Bryan Williams	6 ft 7 in (2.01 m)	215 lb (98 kg)	Jr	Palisades HS	Inglewood, CA
G	20	Rob Williams	6 ft 2 in (1.88 m)	175 lb (79 kg)	Jr	Milby HS	Houston, TX
F	42	Michael Young	6 ft 6 in (1.98 m)	210 lb (95 kg)	So	Yates HS	Houston, TX

Head coach

- Guy Lewis (Houston)

Assistant coach(es)

- Terry Kirkpatrick
- Don Schverak

Legend

- (C) Team captain
- (S) Suspended
- (I) Ineligible
- (W) Walk-on
- Injured
- Current redshirt

Roster

== Schedule and results ==
Date time, TV	Rank^{#}	Opponent^{#}	Result	Record	Site city, state
Regular season
Nov 30, 1981*		West Texas State	W 84–73	1–0	Hofheinz Pavilion; Houston, Texas
Dec 4, 1981*		vs. Seton Hall	L 85–87 ^{OT}	1–1	Brendan Byrne Arena (10,648); East Rutherford, New Jersey
Dec 6, 1981*		Biscayne	W 106–74	2–1	Hofheinz Pavilion; Houston, Texas
Dec 8, 1981*		Texas Lutheran	W 145–78	3–1	Hofheinz Pavilion; Houston, Texas
Dec 12, 1981*		UTSA	W 105–69	4–1	Hofheinz Pavilion; Houston, Texas
Dec 15, 1981*		UC Santa Barbara	W 74–68	5–1	Hofheinz Pavilion; Houston, Texas
Dec 18, 1981*		Mississippi State; Kettle Classic	W 96–49	6–1	Hofheinz Pavilion; Houston, Texas
Dec 19, 1981*		No. 6 Iowa; Kettle Classic	W 62–52	7–1	Hofheinz Pavilion; Houston, Texas
Dec 28, 1981*	No. 18	vs. Purdue; Sugar Bowl Classic	W 59–58	8–1	Louisiana Superdome; New Orleans, Louisiana
Dec 29, 1981*	No. 18	vs. LSU; Sugar Bowl Classic	W 73–69	9–1	Louisiana Superdome; New Orleans, Louisiana
Jan 4, 1982	No. 18	Rice	W 63–61	10–1 (1–0)	Hofheinz Pavilion; Houston, Texas
Jan 9, 1982	No. 14	at Texas Tech	W 78–68	11–1 (2–0)	Lubbock Municipal Coliseum; Lubbock, Texas
Jan 12, 1982	No. 10	No. 19 Texas	L 83–95	11–2 (2–1)	Hofheinz Pavilion; Houston, Texas
Jan 16, 1982	No. 10	SMU	L 66–67	11–3 (2–2)	Hofheinz Pavilion; Houston, Texas
Jan 23, 1982	No. 19	at No. 15 Arkansas	L 66–67	11–4 (2–3)	Barnhill Arena; Fayetteville, Arkansas
Jan 26, 1982		at TCU	L 82–85	11–5 (2–4)	Daniel-Meyer Coliseum; Fort Worth, Texas
Jan 30, 1982		Baylor	W 99–78	12–5 (3–4)	Hofheinz Pavilion; Houston, Texas
Feb 1, 1982		at Texas A&M	L 77–95	12–6 (3–5)	G. Rollie White Coliseum; College Station, Texas
Feb 3, 1982		Texas Tech	W 83–80	13–6 (4–5)	Hofheinz Pavilion; Houston, Texas
Feb 6, 1982		at SMU	W 73–71 ^{OT}	14–6 (5–5)	Moody Coliseum; University Park, Texas
Feb 8, 1982		at No. 12 Texas	W 77–63	15–6 (6–5)	Frank Erwin Center; Austin, Texas
Feb 13, 1982		No. 8 Arkansas	W 55–53	16–6 (7–5)	Hofheinz Pavilion; Houston, Texas
Feb 16, 1982		TCU	W 74–65	17–6 (8–5)	Hofheinz Pavilion; Houston, Texas
Feb 20, 1982		at Baylor	W 78–74	18–6 (9–5)	Heart O' Texas Coliseum; Waco, Texas
Feb 23, 1982		at Rice	W 75–69	19–6 (10–5)	Rice Gymnasium; Houston, Texas
Feb 27, 1982		Texas A&M	W 96–93	20–6 (11–5)	Hofheinz Pavilion; Houston, Texas
SWC tournament
Mar 5, 1982*	(2)	vs. (3) Texas A&M; Semifinals	W 89–76	21–6	Reunion Arena; Dallas, Texas
Mar 6, 1982*	(2)	vs. (1) No. 14 Arkansas; Championship	L 69–84	21–7	Reunion Arena; Dallas, Texas
NCAA tournament
Mar 11, 1982*	(6 MW)	vs. (11 MW) Alcorn State; First round	W 94–84	22–7	Mabee Center; Tulsa, Oklahoma
Mar 13, 1982*	(6 MW)	vs. (3 MW) No. 10 Tulsa; Second round	W 78–74	23–7	Mabee Center; Tulsa, Oklahoma
Mar 19, 1982*	(6 MW)	vs. (2 MW) No. 5 Missouri; Sweet Sixteen	W 79–78	24–7	Checkerdome; St. Louis, Missouri
Mar 21, 1982*	(6 MW)	vs. (8 MW) Boston College; Elite Eight	W 99–92	25–7	Checkerdome; St. Louis, Missouri
Mar 27, 1982*	(6 MW)	vs. (1 E) No. 1 North Carolina; Final Four	L 63–68	25–8	Louisiana Superdome (61,612); New Orleans, Louisiana
*Non-conference game. ^{#}Rankings from AP Poll. (#) Tournament seedings in parentheses. MW=Midwest region. E=East region. All times are in Central Time.

=== NCAA tournament ===
- Midwest
  - Houston 94, Alcorn State 84
  - Houston 78, Tulsa 74
  - Houston 79, Missouri 78
  - Houston 99, Boston College 92
- Final Four
  - North Carolina 68, Houston 63

== Rankings ==
Ranking movements Legend: ██ Increase in ranking ██ Decrease in ranking — = Not ranked
	Week															
Poll	Pre	1	2	3	4	5	6	7	8	9	10	11	12	13	14	Final
AP	—	—	—	—	18	18	14	10	19	—	—	—	—	—	—	—
Coaches	—	—	—	—	17	17	16	12	—	—	—	—	—	—	—	—

== Awards and honors ==
- Rob Williams, 1st Team All-Southwest Conference
- Rob Williams, Midwest Regional Most Outstanding Player
- Rob Williams, All-SWC Tournament team
- Clyde Drexler, 2nd Team All-Southwest Conference
- Larry Micheaux, All Midwest Regional

== Team players drafted into the NBA ==
Year	Player	Round	Pick	NBA club
1982	Rob Williams	1	19	Denver Nuggets
1982	Lynden Rose	6	136	Los Angeles Lakers
1983	Clyde Drexler	1	14	Portland Trail Blazers
1983	Larry Micheaux	2	29	Chicago Bulls
1984	Akeem Olajuwon	1	1	Houston Rockets
1983	Michael Young	1	24	Boston Celtics
1985	Reid Gettys	5	103	Chicago Bulls
