= Jacob Young (basketball) =

American basketball player (born 1997)

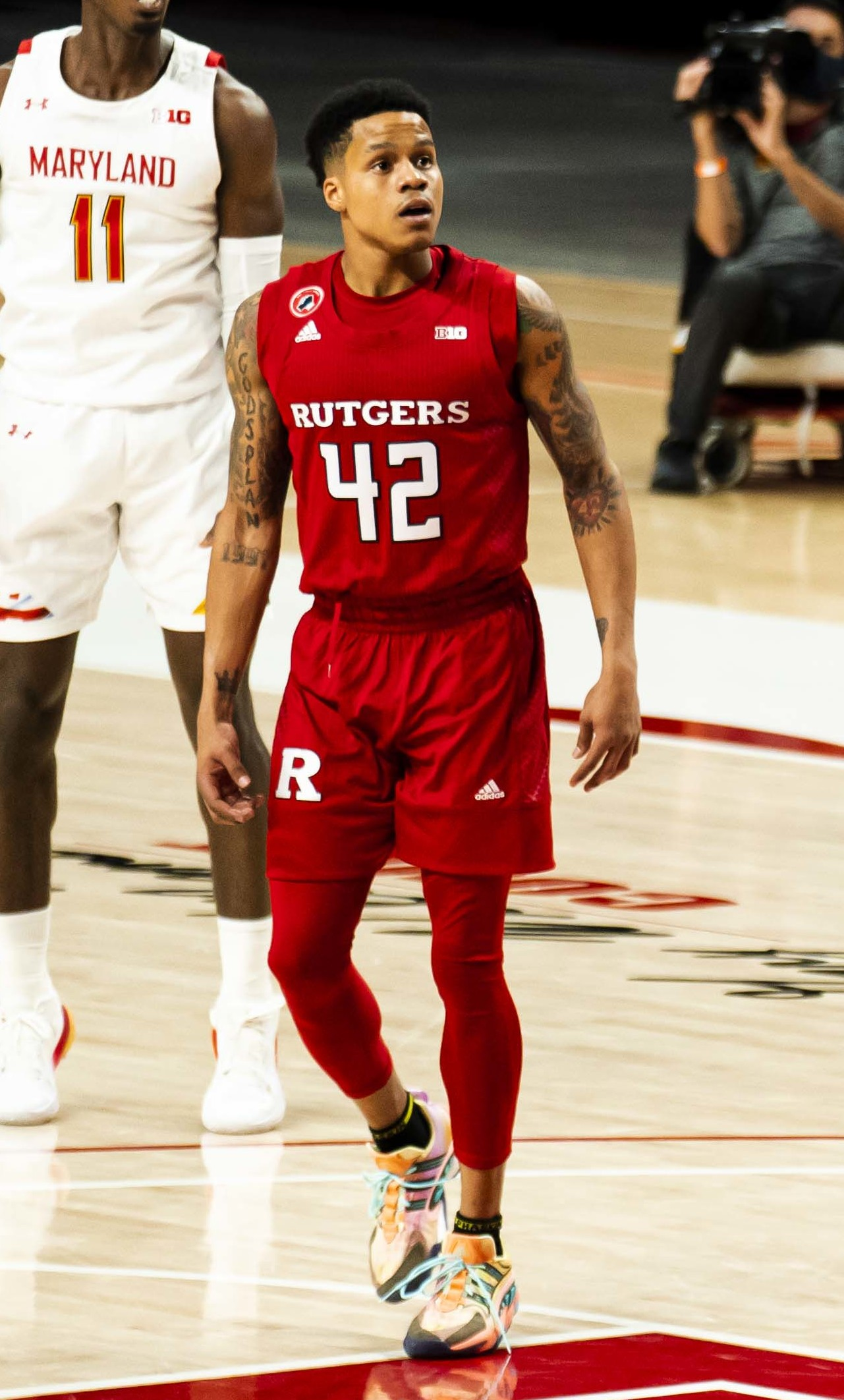
- Young with Rutgers in 2020

Personal information
- Born: September 21, 1997 (age 29) Houston, Texas, U.S.
- Listed height: 6 ft 2 in (1.88 m)
- Listed weight: 185 lb (84 kg)

Career information
- High school: Yates (Houston, Texas)
- College: Texas (2016–2018); Rutgers (2019–2021); Oregon (2021–2022)
- NBA draft: 2022: undrafted
- Playing career: 2022–2024
- Position: Point guard

Career history
- 2023: Memphis Hustle
- 2023: Texas Legends
- 2023: Maine Celtics
- 2023: Halcones de Ciudad Obregón
- 2024: Windy City Bulls

Jacob Michael Young (born September 21, 1997) is an American former professional basketball player who last played for the Windy City Bulls of the NBA G League. He played college basketball for the Oregon Ducks of the Pac-12 Conference. He also played for the Texas Longhorns and the Rutgers Scarlet Knights.

== High school career ==
Young played basketball for Yates High School in Houston. He was a two-time Class 5A All-State selection. He committed to playing college basketball for Texas over offers from Baylor, Duquesne and Memphis.

== College career ==
Young struggled as a freshman at Texas, averaging 3.7 points per game and shooting 28 percent from the field. In his sophomore season, he averaged 6.2 points per game, before transferring to Rutgers. He sat out for one year due to transfer rules. As a junior, Young averaged 8.5 points, 2.7 rebounds and 1.9 assists per game. He was suspended for one game for a violation of team rules; he pleaded guilty to reckless driving. As a senior, Young averaged 14.1 points, 3.4 assists and 1.7 steals per game. On March 26, 2021, he declared for the 2021 NBA draft and entered the transfer portal. On June 2, 2021, Young transferred to Oregon.

== Professional career ==
=== Memphis Hustle (2023) ===
On October 23, 2022, Young was named to the Memphis Hustle training camp roster via local tryout. However, he did not make the final roster. On January 20, 2023, Young was reacquired by the Memphis Hustle. On February 25, 2023, Young was waived.

=== Texas Legends (2023) ===
On March 8, 2023, Young was acquired by the Texas Legends. He was waived four days later, after appearing in two games.

=== Maine Celtics (2023) ===
On March 14, 2023, Young was acquired by the Maine Celtics.

=== Halcones de Ciudad Obregón (2023) ===
On May 2, 2023, Young signed with the Halcones de Ciudad Obregón of the CIBACOPA, making his debut that night.

On October 28, 2023, Young rejoined the Maine Celtics for training camp, but was waived on November 9.

=== Windy City Bulls (2024) ===
On February 6, 2024, Young joined the Windy City Bulls, but was waived on November 4.

== Career statistics ==
Legend
GP	Games played	GS	Games started	MPG	Minutes per game
FG%	Field goal percentage	3P%	3-point field goal percentage	FT%	Free throw percentage
RPG	Rebounds per game	APG	Assists per game	SPG	Steals per game
BPG	Blocks per game	PPG	Points per game	**Bold**	Career high

=== College ===
Year	Team	GP	GS	MPG	FG%	3P%	FT%	RPG	APG	SPG	BPG	PPG
2016–17	Texas	**33**	5	16.4	.287	.227	**.786**	.9	.8	.2	.0	3.7
2017–18	Texas	30	5	16.8	.413	.323	.682	1.7	.7	.7	.0	6.2
2018–19	Rutgers	Redshirt										
2019–20	Rutgers	30	0	21.3	.413	.277	.591	**2.7**	1.9	1.0	.0	8.5
2020–21	Rutgers	28	**20**	**30.1**	**.469**	**.369**	.726	1.9	**3.4**	**1.7**	.0	**14.1**
Career		121	30	20.9	.412	.295	.677	1.8	1.7	.9	.0	7.9

== Personal life ==
Young's father, Michael, played college basketball for Houston, where he was a part of Phi Slama Jama, before embarking on a 14-year professional career in the NBA and other leagues. His older brother, Joe, was drafted into the NBA following a college career at Houston and Oregon. Another brother, Michael Jr., played college football at Houston. His sisters, Mayorca and Milan, were track and field athletes in college.
