= Reid Gettys =

American lawyer and basketball player/coach

Personal information
- Born: February 14, 1963 (age 63)
- Listed height: 6 ft 7 in (2.01 m)
- Listed weight: 200 lb (91 kg)

Career information
- High school: Memorial (Hedwig Village, Texas)
- College: Houston (1981–1985)
- NBA draft: 1985: 5th round, 103rd overall pick
- Drafted by: Chicago Bulls
- Position: Guard / forward
- Number: 44

Career history

Playing
- 1987–1988: Albany Patroons

Coaching
- 1998: Houston (assistant)
- 2011: The Woodlands Christian Academy

Career highlights
- CBA champion (1988)
- Stats at Basketball Reference

Reid Grayson Gettys (born February 14, 1963) is an American lawyer and a former college and professional basketball player, best known as a member of the Houston Cougars men's basketball team during the early 1980s.

== Biography ==
Gettys played high school basketball at Houston's Memorial High School, but chose to stay home to attend college and play for Guy Lewis, rather than following in his father footsteps in attending and playing for Texas Tech University.

A "set up man" in large part, Gettys played a pivotal role in the success of the powerhouse Phi Slama Jama basketball teams at the University of Houston during the early to mid-1980s. Gettys, who ranks as Houston's all-time leader in assists with 740, was responsible for distributing the ball to teammates Hakeem Olajuwon, Clyde Drexler, Benny Anders, Michael Young, Larry Micheaux and, later, Rickie Winslow. Gettys had a 17-assist game against Rice University on February 17, 1985. He also handed out 15 assists in a November 26, 1983, game against the University of Kansas. He was also an accurate shooter from long distance (although he played prior to the three-point line) and virtually "automatic" from the free throw line. During the 1982 NCAA Tournament, on March 21, 1982, Gettys sank 10 consecutive free throws down the stretch to move Houston past Boston College and into the Final Four.

The 6-foot-7-inch (2.01 m) Gettys was drafted by the Chicago Bulls in the fifth round of the 1985 NBA draft, but never played in the NBA. He was a member of Bill Musselman's 1987–88 Albany Patroons team of the Continental Basketball Association (CBA) that posted a 48–6 (.889) record on its way to winning the CBA championship.

Gettys spent one season as an assistant coach for the Houston Cougars under his former teammate, Drexler. He has also worked as an ESPN basketball analyst and has been a commentator for Houston Rockets games.

Gettys later earned a J.D. degree and has worked as an attorney in Texas. He and his wife, Lisa, have two sons and a daughter.

== University of Houston Cougars records ==
- Most assists, career: 740 (in 120 games) (14 in 1981–82; 209 in 1982–83; 309 in 1983–84; 208 in 1984–85)
- Highest average, assists per game, career: 6.2 (740/120)
- Most assists, season: 309 (in 37 games; 1983–84)
- Highest average, assists per game, season: 8.4 (309/37, 1983–84)
- Most assists, game: 17, vs. Rice, February 17, 1985
