= 1981–82 Arkansas Razorbacks men's basketball team =

American college basketball season

1981–82 Arkansas Razorbacks men's basketball

Southwest Conference Tournament champions Southwest Conference regular season champions

NCAA tournament, Second round
- Conference: Southwest Conference

Ranking
- Coaches: No. 13
- AP: No. 12
- Record: 23–6 (12–4 SWC)
- Head coach: Eddie Sutton (8th season)
- Assistant coach: Bill Brown (2nd season)
- Home arena: Barnhill Arena

1981–82 Southwest Conference men's basketball standings
	Conf.				Overall
Team	W		L	PCT	W		L	PCT
No. 12 Arkansas †	12	–	4	.750	23	–	6	.793
Houston	11	–	5	.688	25	–	8	.758
Texas A&M	10	–	6	.625	20	–	11	.645
Baylor	9	–	7	.563	17	–	11	.607
TCU	9	–	7	.563	16	–	13	.552
Texas Tech	8	–	8	.500	17	–	11	.607
Texas	6	–	10	.375	16	–	10	.615
Rice	6	–	10	.375	15	–	15	.500
SMU	1	–	15	.063	6	–	21	.222
† 1982 SWC tournament winner Rankings from AP poll

The 1981–82 Arkansas Razorbacks men's basketball team represented the University of Arkansas during the 1981–82 NCAA Division I men's basketball season. The head coach was Eddie Sutton, serving for his eighth year. The team played its home games in Barnhill Arena in Fayetteville, Arkansas. This team finished second in the SWC regular season standings, and lost in the semifinals of the conference tournament. In the 1982 NCAA Tournament, the Hogs were defeated by Kansas State in the round of 32.

== Roster ==
1982–83 Arkansas Razorbacks men's basketball team
Players
Coaches

Pos.	#	Name	Height	Weight	Year	Previous school	Hometown
G	20	Darrell Walker	6 ft 4 in (1.93 m)	180 lb (82 kg)	Jr	Arkansas–Fort Smith	Chicago, Illinois
G	21	Alvin Robertson	6 ft 4 in (1.93 m)	200 lb (91 kg)	So	Crowder College	Barberton, Ohio
C	35	Joe Kleine	6 ft 11 in (2.11 m)	250 lb (113 kg)	Fr	Notre Dame	Slater, Missouri
C	44	Scott Hastings	6 ft 10 in (2.08 m)	235 lb (107 kg)	Sr	Independence High School	Independence, Kansas

Head coach

- Eddie Sutton

Assistant coach(es)

- Bill Brown

Legend

- (C) Team captain
- (S) Suspended
- (I) Ineligible
- (W) Walk-on
- Injured
- Current redshirt

== Schedule and results ==
Date time, TV	Rank^{#}	Opponent^{#}	Result	Record	Site (attendance) city, state
Regular Season
Feb 27, 1982		Texas Tech	W 67–61	21–5 (12–4)	Barnhill Arena; Fayetteville, Arkansas
SWC Tournament
Mar 3, 1982*		vs. Texas Christian; Semifinals	W 80–70	22–5	Reunion Arena; Dallas, Texas
Mar 4, 1982*		vs. Houston; Championship game	W 84–69	23–5	Reunion Arena; Dallas, Texas
NCAA Tournament
Mar 14, 1982*	(4 MW) No. 12	vs. (5 MW) Kansas State; Second round	L 64–65	23–6	Reunion Arena; Dallas, Texas
*Non-conference game. ^{#}Rankings from AP Poll. (#) Tournament seedings in parentheses. MW=Midwest. All times are in Central Time.

== 1982 NBA draft ==
Player	Round	Pick	NBA club
Scott Hastings	2	29	New York Knicks
