= Larry Micheaux =

American basketball player (born 1960)

Personal information
- Born: March 24, 1960 (age 66) Houston, Texas, U.S.
- Listed height: 6 ft 9 in (2.06 m)
- Listed weight: 220 lb (100 kg)

Career information
- High school: Worthing (Houston, Texas)
- College: Houston (1979–1983)
- NBA draft: 1983: 2nd round, 29th overall pick
- Drafted by: Chicago Bulls
- Playing career: 1983–1994
- Position: Power forward
- Number: 40

Career history
- 1983–1984: Kansas City Kings
- 1984: Milwaukee Bucks
- 1984–1985: Houston Rockets
- 1985–1986: Divarese Varese
- 1986–1990: Caja Álava / Taugrés Vitoria
- 1990–1993: Pamesa Valencia
- 1994: Argal Huesca

Career highlights
- Second-team All-SWC (1983)
- Stats at NBA.com
- Stats at Basketball Reference

Larry Wayne Micheaux (/ˈmiːʃɔː/ MEE-shaw) (born March 24, 1960) is an American former professional basketball player who played for several teams in the National Basketball Association (NBA) and in Europe. He played college basketball for the Houston Cougars.

== College career ==
After earning all-state honors as a senior at E. E. Worthing High School in Houston, Texas, Micheaux attended the University of Houston, where he earned honorable mention All-America honors. He was a member of the Cougars' Phi Slama Jama men's team under head coach Guy Lewis that reached three NCAA Final Fours. As a senior, he averaged 14 points and 7 rebounds a game during that season while playing alongside Akeem Olajuwon, Clyde Drexler, Alvin Franklin, Benny Anders, Reid Gettys and Michael Young. (Olajuwon and Drexler rank as two of the top 50 NBA players of all time.)

Micheaux led the Cougars in field goal percentage in 1979–80 (.530) and 1980–81 (.600). He also led the team in blocked shots in 1980–81 with 49.

== Professional career ==
After receiving a business degree at the University of Houston, Micheaux was drafted by the Chicago Bulls in the second round of the 1983 NBA draft. The 6-foot-9-inch Houston native played two seasons (96 games) with three teams in the NBA: the Kansas City Kings (1983–84), Milwaukee Bucks (1984–85) and Houston Rockets (1984–85).

Nicknamed "Mr. Mean", Micheaux spent the next decade playing in the Italian and Spanish basketball leagues. Retired since 1995, he is known as one of the top rebounders in Spanish ACB League history, trailing only Arvydas Sabonis in career average per game.

== Personal life ==
Micheaux is currently married to Annette (née Collins); they have three children, daughters LaTasha Antoinette (b. 1983) and La Toya Aneise (b. 1987), and son Joshua Christopher (b. 1990). Larry also had two grandsons and a granddaughter via LaTasha.

La Toya was a starter on the Texas A&M women's basketball team, and had a successful four year high school career at Missouri City, Texas's Hightower High School, which included two first team all greater Houston stints. Josh played for the Georgia State University Panthers men's basketball team.

Micheaux currently is the director of several basketball summer camps in Sugar Land, Texas. This includes a fundamentals camp, an advanced fundamental camp, position and games camp, and an elite camp. Micheaux says on his website, "Our goal and commitment is to teach the game of basketball in a fun filled learning environment. Emphasis is placed on fair play, competition, goal setting, teamwork, and building self esteem. The committed basketball enthusiasts may attend our programs year around and fine-tune all aspects of their game."

== Career statistics ==
Legend
GP	Games played	GS	Games started	MPG	Minutes per game
FG%	Field goal percentage	3P%	3-point field goal percentage	FT%	Free throw percentage
RPG	Rebounds per game	APG	Assists per game	SPG	Steals per game
BPG	Blocks per game	PPG	Points per game	**Bold**	Career high

=== NBA ===
==== Regular season ====
Year	Team	GP	GS	MPG	FG%	3P%	FT%	RPG	APG	SPG	BPG	PPG
1983–84	Kansas City	**39**	0	8.5	.544	–	.538	**2.9**	.5	**.5**	.3	3.1
1984–85	Milwaukee	18	0	9.5	.486	–	**.706**	2.4	**.7**	.4	**.4**	2.6
1984–85	Houston	**39**	0	**10.1**	**.607**	.000	.654	2.5	.4	.3	**.4**	**4.2**
Career		96	0	9.3	.567	.000	.610	2.7	.5	.4	.3	3.4

==== Playoffs ====
Year	Team	GP	GS	MPG	FG%	3P%	FT%	RPG	APG	SPG	BPG	PPG
1984	Kansas City	3		**21.7**	**.667**	–	**.600**	**7.0**	**1.0**	.0	**1.7**	**10.0**
1985	Boston	**5**	0	11.4	.316	.000	.400	4.2	.0	.0	.4	3.2
Career		8	0	15.3	.486	.000	.500	5.3	.4	.0	.9	4.8
