= Joe Young (basketball) =

American basketball player (born 1992)

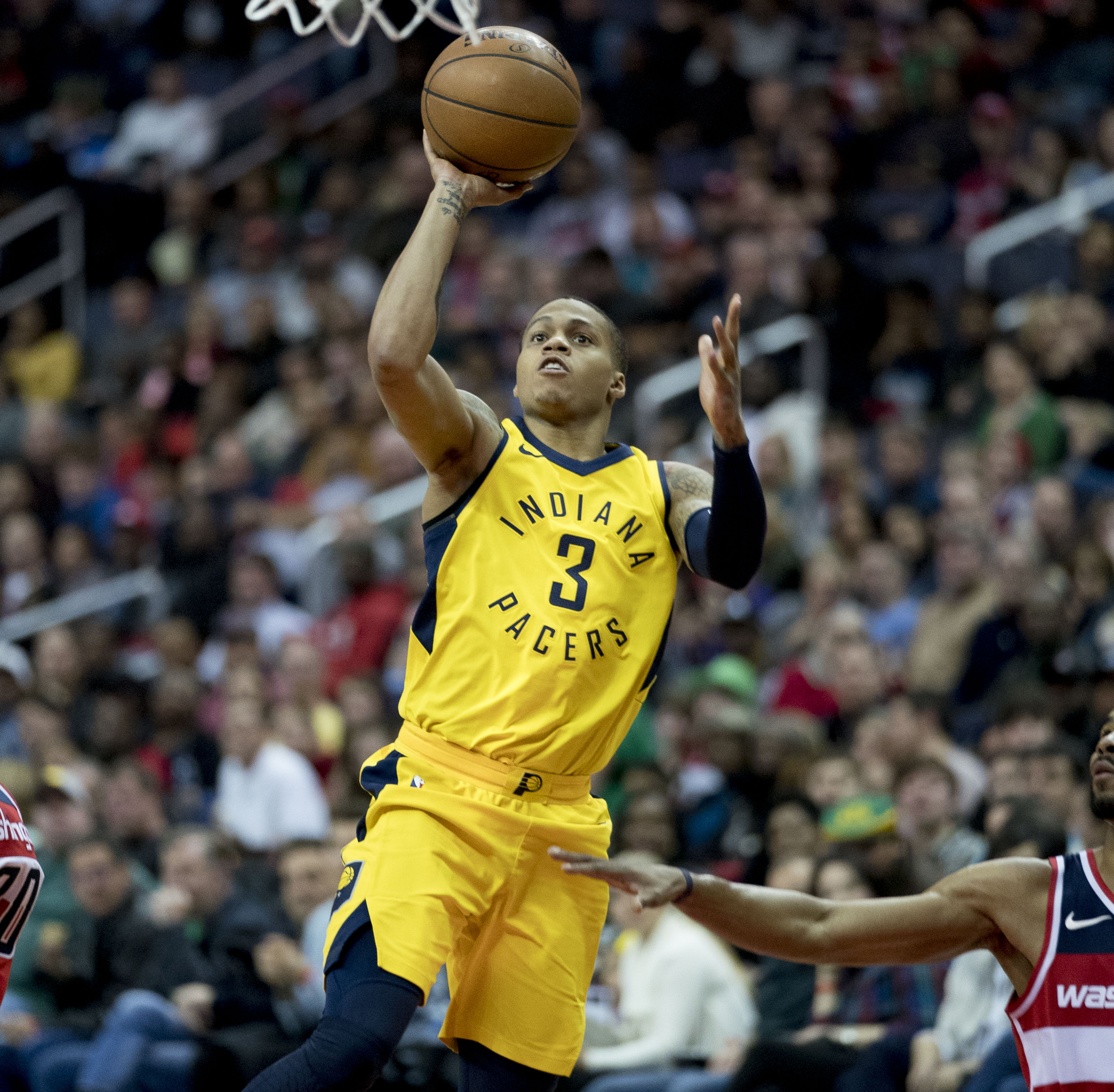
- Young with the Indiana Pacers in 2018

Free agent
- Position: Point guard / shooting guard

Personal information
- Born: June 27, 1992 (age 34) Houston, Texas, U.S.
- Listed height: 6 ft 2 in (1.88 m)
- Listed weight: 185 lb (84 kg)

Career information
- High school: Yates (Houston, Texas)
- College: Houston (2011–2013); Oregon (2013–2015)
- NBA draft: 2015: 2nd round, 43rd overall pick
- Drafted by: Indiana Pacers
- Playing career: 2015–present

Career history
- 2015–2018: Indiana Pacers
- 2015–2017: →Fort Wayne Mad Ants
- 2018–2020: Nanjing Monkey Kings
- 2020–2021: Beijing Royal Fighters
- 2021–2022: Birmingham Squadron
- 2022–2023: Promitheas Patras
- 2023: Napoli Basket
- 2023: Changsha Wantian Yongsheng
- 2023–2024: Fujian Sturgeons
- 2024: Kuwait SC
- 2024: Shahrdari Gorgan
- 2024–2025: Fujian Sturgeons
- 2025: Atléticos de San Germán
- 2025: Beirut Club
- 2025–2026: Qingdao Eagles

Career highlights
- NBL All-Star (2023); NBL All-Star Weekend Skills Challenge Champion (2023); CBA Foreign MVP (2020); CBA scoring champion (2020); CBA All-Star (2019); CBA All-Star Game MVP (2019); Third-team All-American – SN (2015); Pac-12 Player of the Year (2015); First-team All-Pac-12 (2015); Second-team All-Pac-12 (2014); Third-team All-Conference USA (2013); Conference USA All-Freshman (2012); Third-team Parade All-American (2010); Texas Mr. Basketball (2010)
- Stats at NBA.com
- Stats at Basketball Reference

Joseph Michael Young (born June 27, 1992) is an American professional basketball player who most recently played for the Qingdao Eagles of the Chinese Basketball Association (CBA). The son of former National Basketball Association (NBA) player Michael Young, he played college basketball with the Houston Cougars and later the Oregon Ducks. Young earned third-team All-American honors and was named conference player of the year in the Pac-12 as a senior with Oregon in 2015. He was selected by the Indiana Pacers in the second round of the 2015 NBA draft with the 43rd overall pick.

== High school career ==
Young attended Yates High School under Greg Wise, where he averaged 27.5 points, 4.1 rebounds, 4.4 steals and 3.8 assists per game as a senior to help lead the Lions to a perfect 34–0 record and the No. 1 national ranking in final polls from USA Today, MaxPreps and Rivals.com. In the process, he was named to the Parade All-America Third-Team, the Texas Gatorade Boys’ Basketball Player of the Year and the Class 4A Texas Association of Basketball Coaches All-State Team. Yates ended up winning their second straight State Championship with Young winning the Most Valuable Player of the state final award.

== College career ==
Young originally committed to Providence, but was forced to sit out a season after fired head coach Keno Davis refused to release him from his letter of intent. He began his collegiate career at Houston, where his father was Director of Basketball Operations. As a sophomore, Young averaged 18 points per game and shot 42 percent from the three-point arc and 87 percent on free throws. After the season, his father refused reassignment at the University of Houston and left the program, and Young opted to transfer. Young announced his intention to transfer to Oregon to play under coach Dana Altman. In 2015, he was named the Pac-12 Conference Player of the Year after averaging 19.8 points, 4.5 rebounds and 3.7 assists per game as a senior. He hit back-to-back game-winning shots versus Arizona State and Washington.

== Professional career ==
=== Indiana Pacers (2015–2018) ===
On June 25, 2015, Young was selected with the 43rd pick of the 2015 NBA draft by the Indiana Pacers. After leading the 2015 NBA Summer League in scoring with 22.5 points per game and earning All-Tournament honors, Young signed a four-year, $4 million deal with the Pacers on July 14. On December 11, 2015, he was assigned to the Fort Wayne Mad Ants of the NBA Development League. He was recalled by the Pacers three days later. On December 27, he was reassigned to the Mad Ants and recalled the next day. On January 17, 2017, Young was assigned to the Fort Wayne Mad Ants, Pacers' D-League affiliate. He was recalled by the Pacers six days later.

=== Nanjing Monkey King (2018–2020) ===
On August 1, 2018, Young signed a one-year deal with Nanjing Monkey King of the Chinese Basketball Association (CBA). In his first career game with the CBA, Young recorded 23 points, 5 rebounds and 5 assists in a 91–118 loss to the Qingdao Eagles. On November 15, 2018, Young recorded a career-high 51 points to go along with 9 rebounds and 2 assists in a 110–124 loss to the Jilin Northeast Tigers.

On June 27, 2019, Young was included in the 2019 NBA Summer League roster of the Los Angeles Lakers. He re-signed with Nanjing for the 2019–20 season,

On July 23, 2020, Young dropped 74 points against Shandong Heroes during one of the final regular season games in the CBA's bubble en route to being named the league's regular season scoring champion. Young marked the third-highest personal single-game scoring show in CBA history.

=== Beijing Royal Fighters (2020–2021) ===
On October 1, 2020, Young signed with the Beijing Royal Fighters of the CBA for an annual salary of $3.1 million. Young will be playing under former NBA All-Star and CBA legend, Stephon Marbury.

Young is coming off a career season where he averaged a league high of 38.3 points, 6.4 assists and 2.3 steals per game for Nanjing Tongxi Monkey Kings.

=== Birmingham Squadron (2021–2022) ===
On October 25, 2021, Young joined the Birmingham Squadron through a trade.

=== Promitheas Patras (2022–2023) ===
On July 22, 2022, Young, according to his agent Pete Mickeal, signed with Promitheas Patras of the Greek Basket League and the EuroCup, his first European club. On January 4, 2023, he parted ways with the Greek club. He averaged 16 points, 2.2 rebounds and 2.2 assists in domestic competition, as well as 23.4 points and 3.9 assists in the EuroCup.

=== Napoli (2023) ===
On January 5, 2023, Young signed with Napoli of the Italian Lega Basket Serie A.

=== Fujian Sturgeons (2024–2025) ===
On July 4, 2024, Young signed with Homenetmen Beirut of the Lebanese Basketball League.

On September 30, 2024, Young signed with the Fujian Sturgeons of the Chinese Basketball Association (CBA).

== Career statistics ==
Legend
GP	Games played	GS	Games started	MPG	Minutes per game
FG%	Field goal percentage	3P%	3-point field goal percentage	FT%	Free throw percentage
RPG	Rebounds per game	APG	Assists per game	SPG	Steals per game
BPG	Blocks per game	PPG	Points per game	**Bold**	Career high

=== NBA Regular season ===
Year	Team	GP	GS	MPG	FG%	3P%	FT%	RPG	APG	SPG	BPG	PPG
2015–16	Indiana	41	0	9.4	.367	.217	**.800**	**1.2**	**1.6**	**.4**	.0	3.8
2016–17	Indiana	33	0	4.1	.361	.217	.733	.5	.5	.1	.0	2.1
2017–18	Indiana	**53**	**1**	**10.5**	**.430**	**.379**	.759	**1.2**	.7	.3	.0	**3.9**
Career		127	1	8.5	.393	.296	.768	1.0	.9	.3	.0	3.4

=== NBA Playoffs ===
Year	Team	GP	GS	MPG	FG%	3P%	FT%	RPG	APG	SPG	BPG	PPG
2016	Indiana	**4**	0	2.5	**.375**	**.250**	**1.000**	**.3**	**.3**	.0	.0	**2.3**
2018	Indiana	1	0	**3.0**	–	–	–	.0	.0	.0	.0	.0
Career		5	0	2.6	.375	.250	1.000	.2	.2	.0	.0	1.8

=== College ===
Year	Team	GP	GS	MPG	FG%	3P%	FT%	RPG	APG	SPG	BPG	PPG
2011–12	Houston	30	16	30.1	.416	.382	.837	3.6	2.4	.9	**.2**	11.3
2012–13	Houston	32	30	32.8	.458	**.420**	.875	3.5	2.5	.6	.0	18.0
2013–14	Oregon	34	34	31.1	**.480**	.415	.881	2.8	1.9	**1.3**	.0	18.9
2014–15	Oregon	**36**	**35**	**36.7**	.448	.357	**.925**	**4.4**	**3.8**	1.1	.0	**20.7**
Career		132	115	32.8	.453	.390	.886	3.6	2.7	1.0	.0	17.5

== Personal life ==
The son of Tina and Michael Young, his father ranks as the third-leading scorer in Houston Cougars history and is one of five players to have his jersey number retired by the school. He majored in sociology. His younger brother Jacob played college basketball for Texas and Rutgers before transferring to Oregon. Young and Paul George are fifth cousins.

=== Philanthropy ===
Young has remained involved in the Houston, Texas community and in 2019 donated 1,000 Thanksgiving Day turkey dinners to less fortunate residents of the city's Midtown district.

== See also ==
- List of second-generation NBA players
