= 1981–82 SMU Mustangs men's basketball team =

American college basketball season

1981–82 SMU Mustangs men's basketball
- Conference: Southwest Conference
- Record: 6–21 (1–15 SWC)
- Head coach: Dave Bliss (2nd season)
- Home arena: Moody Coliseum

1981–82 Southwest Conference men's basketball standings
	Conf.				Overall
Team	W		L	PCT	W		L	PCT
No. 12 Arkansas †	12	–	4	.750	23	–	6	.793
Houston	11	–	5	.688	25	–	8	.758
Texas A&M	10	–	6	.625	20	–	11	.645
Baylor	9	–	7	.563	17	–	11	.607
TCU	9	–	7	.563	16	–	13	.552
Texas Tech	8	–	8	.500	17	–	11	.607
Texas	6	–	10	.375	16	–	10	.615
Rice	6	–	10	.375	15	–	15	.500
SMU	1	–	15	.063	6	–	21	.222
† 1982 SWC tournament winner Rankings from AP poll

The 1981–82 SMU Mustangs men's basketball team represented Southern Methodist University during the 1981–82 men's college basketball season.

== Schedule ==
Date time, TV	Rank^{#}	Opponent^{#}	Result	Record	Site city, state
November 28*		Wisconsin-Oshkosh	W 62–44	1–0	Moody Coliseum; University Park, Texas
November 30*		Southwestern	W 74–62	2–0	Moody Coliseum; University Park, Texas
December 2*; 7:35 pm		at Iowa State	L 70–80	2–1	Hilton Coliseum (8,112); Ames, Iowa
December 5*		Texas-Arlington	W 82–73	3–1	Moody Coliseum; University Park, Texas
December 7*		Alabama	L 62–69	3–2	Moody Coliseum; University Park, Texas
December 11*		vs. Penn State	L 53–65	3–3	
December 12*		vs. Colorado State	L 56–74	3–4	
December 19*	No. 3	at Kansas	L 71–81	3–5	Allen Fieldhouse; Lawrence, Kansas
December 22*		Texas Wesleyan	W 87–78 ^{OT}	4–5	Moody Coliseum; University Park, Texas
January 2*		Angelo State	W 77–66	5–5	Moody Coliseum; University Park, Texas
January 6		at Arkansas	L 48–68	5–6 (0–1)	Barnhill Arena; Fayetteville, Arkansas
January 9		Texas	L 51–60	5–7 (0–2)	Moody Coliseum; University Park, Texas
January 12		at Baylor	L 50–52	5–8 (0–3)	Heart O' Texas Coliseum; Waco, Texas
January 16		at No. 10 Houston	W 67–66	6–8 (1–3)	Hofheinz Pavilion; Houston, Texas
January 19		Texas A&M	L 55–81	6–9 (1–4)	Moody Coliseum; University Park, Texas
January 23		TCU	L 61–63	6–10 (1–5)	Moody Coliseum; University Park, Texas
January 25		at Rice	L 40–42	6–11 (1–6)	Tudor Fieldhouse; Houston, Texas
January 30		Texas Tech	L 52–63	6–12 (1–7)	Moody Coliseum; University Park, Texas
February 3		at Texas	L 59–69	6–13 (1–8)	Frank Erwin Center; Austin, Texas
February 6		Houston	L 71–73	6–14 (1–9)	Moody Coliseum; University Park, Texas
February 8		Baylor	L 59–70	6–15 (1–10)	Moody Coliseum; University Park, Texas
February 10		at Texas A&M	L 58–67	6–16 (1–11)	G. Rollie White Coliseum; College Station, Texas
February 13		at TCU	L 60–85	6–17 (1–12)	Daniel-Meyer Coliseum; Fort Worth, Texas
February 16		Rice	L 48–70	6–18 (1–13)	Moody Coliseum; University Park, Texas
February 20		at Texas Tech	L 44–71	6–19 (1–14)	Lubbock Municipal Coliseum; Lubbock, Texas
February 23		No. 15 Arkansas	L 53–54	6–20 (1–15)	Moody Coliseum; University Park, Texas
Southwest tournament
March 1	(9)	vs. (4) TCU; First Round	L 45–54	6–21 (1–15)	Daniel-Meyer Coliseum; Fort Worth, Texas
*Non-conference game. ^{#}Rankings from AP Poll. (#) Tournament seedings in parentheses. All times are in Central Time.
