= Lynden Rose =

Bahamian basketball player

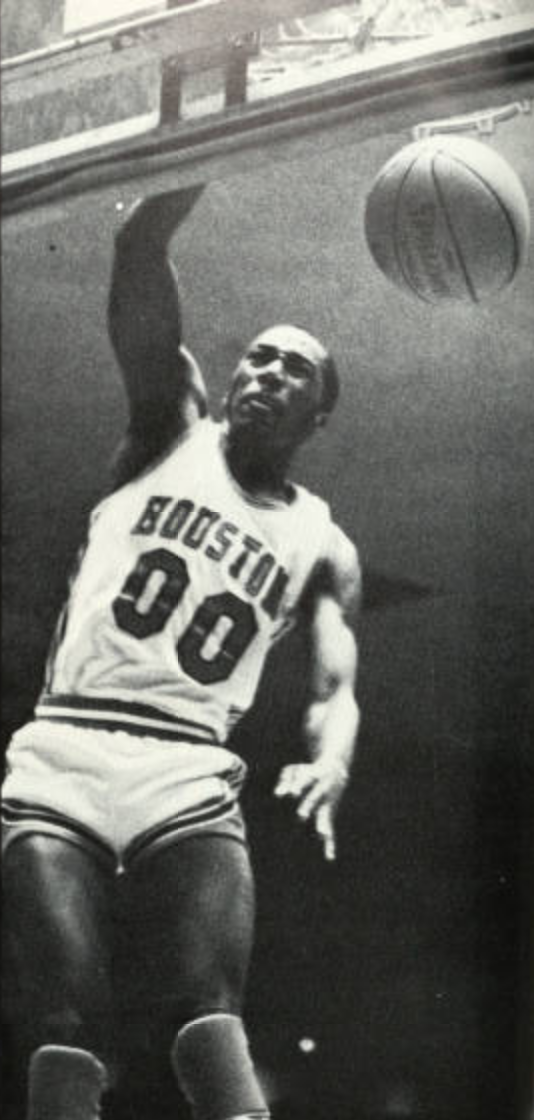
- Lynden Rose dunking the ball during the 1981-82 season

Personal information
- Born: November 14, 1960 (age 64); Nassau, Bahamas
- Listed height: 6 ft 3 in (1.91 m)
- Listed weight: 175 lb (79 kg)

Career information
- High school: Miami Jackson (Miami, Florida); Miami Springs (Miami Springs, Florida)
- College: North Harris CC (1978–1980); Houston (1980–1982)
- NBA draft: 1982: 6th round, 136th overall pick
- Selected by the Los Angeles Lakers
- Playing career: 1982–1983
- Position: Point guard

Career history
- 1982: Las Vegas Silvers
- 1983: Billings Volcanos
- Stats at Basketball Reference

Lynden Bernard Rose Sr. (born November 14, 1960) is a Bahamian retired basketball player. He is best known as co-captain of the first of the three Phi Slama Jama teams at the University of Houston.

== Early life ==
Rose was born and grew up in the city of Nassau in the Bahamas. He attended Miami Jackson High School and Miami Springs High School in the Miami, Florida area.

== College career ==
After transferring from North Harris County College, Rose played as a point guard for the University of Houston Cougars from 1980 to 1982, starting both years and wearing the number 00.

As a senior, Rose co-captained the 1981–82 team, the first of three squads that would later bear the moniker of "Phi Slama Jama." Rose and the rest of "Texas' Tallest Fraternity" reached the Final Four of the 1982 NCAA Division I men's basketball tournament. In the national semifinals, Houston lost to the eventual champions, the University of North Carolina Tar Heels. In the final game of his collegiate career, Rose led all Cougars with 20 points; in doing so, he also outscored a young Michael Jordan, who scored 18 points.

== Professional career ==
The Los Angeles Lakers drafted Rose in the sixth round of the 1982 NBA draft with the 136th overall pick, though Rose never played a minute for the team and was cut during the preseason. The following year, the Houston Rockets signed and released Rose during the preseason.

Rose played his first professional season in the Continental Basketball Association (CBA). He split the 1982–83 season between the Las Vegas Silvers and Billings Volcanos, averaging 9.6 points over 30 games.

== Personal life ==
Rose is now a prominent attorney in the Houston area. He was a member of the University of Houston Board of Regents from 2004 to 2009. Rose is a Republican.

His wife, Marilyn A. Rose, is the Vice Chair of the Texas Southern University Board of Regents. They have three children: Lynden Jr. (nicknamed "L.J."), Lynnard, and Madelyn.

Rose's elder son, L.J., also played competitive basketball. After one year spent at Baylor, L.J. played for Houston from 2013 to 2016 before transferring for one final year at Brigham Young University. L.J. played one season for the Salt Lake City Stars in the NBA G League. Rose's younger son, Lynnard, played football for Columbia University from 2016 to 2019.

Rose's older brother, Cecil, played for the Cougars from 1974 to 1978. Cecil died on December 27, 2013.
