= 1982 Southwest Conference men's basketball tournament =

- Classification: Division I
- Season: 1981–82
- Teams: 9
- Site: Reunion Arena; Dallas, Texas
- Champions: Arkansas (3rd title)
- Winning coach: Eddie Sutton (3rd title)
- MVP: Alvin Robertson (Arkansas)

1981–82 Southwest Conference men's basketball standings
	Conf.				Overall
Team	W		L	PCT	W		L	PCT
No. 12 Arkansas †	12	–	4	.750	23	–	6	.793
Houston	11	–	5	.688	25	–	8	.758
Texas A&M	10	–	6	.625	20	–	11	.645
Baylor	9	–	7	.563	17	–	11	.607
TCU	9	–	7	.563	16	–	13	.552
Texas Tech	8	–	8	.500	17	–	11	.607
Texas	6	–	10	.375	16	–	10	.615
Rice	6	–	10	.375	15	–	15	.500
SMU	1	–	15	.063	6	–	21	.222
† 1982 SWC tournament winner Rankings from AP poll

The 1982 Southwest Conference men's basketball tournament was held March 4–6 at Reunion Arena in Dallas, Texas. The first round took place March 1 at the higher seeded campus sites.

Number 1 seed Arkansas defeated 2 seed Houston 84–69 to win their 3rd championship and receive the conference's automatic bid to the 1982 NCAA tournament.

== Format and seeding ==
The tournament consisted of 9 teams in a single-elimination tournament. The 3 seed received a bye to the Quarterfinals and the 1 and 2 seed received a bye to the Semifinals.

Place	Seed	Team	Conference			Overall		
Place	Seed	Team	W	L	%	W	L	%
1	1	Arkansas	12	4	.750	23	6	.793
2	2	Houston	11	5	.688	25	8	.758
3	3	Texas A&M	10	6	.625	20	11	.645
4	4	TCU	9	7	.563	16	13	.552
4	5	Baylor	9	7	.563	17	11	.607
6	6	Texas Tech	8	8	.500	17	11	.607
7	7	Rice	6	10	.375	15	15	.500
7	8	Texas	6	10	.375	16	11	.593
9	9	SMU	1	15	.063	6	21	.222

== Tournament ==
Date	Winner	Score	Loser	Notes
First Round
Mar 1	6 Texas Tech	60-46	7 Rice	at Texas Tech
Mar 1	4 TCU	54-46	9 SMU	at TCU
Mar 1	5 Baylor	48-46	8 Texas	at Baylor
Quarterfinals
Mar 4	4 TCU	67-61	6 Texas Tech	
Mar 4	3 Texas A&M	64-63	5 Baylor	
Semifinals
Mar 5	1 Arkansas	80-70	4 TCU	
Mar 5	2 Houston	89-76	3 Texas A&M	
Finals
Mar 6	1 Arkansas	84-69	2 Houston	
