= Phi Slama Jama =

Nickname of University of Houston men's basketball teams

University of Houston logo

Phi Slama Jama was a name given to the men's college basketball teams of the Houston Cougars from 1981 to 1984. Coined by former Houston Post sportswriter Thomas Bonk, the nickname was quickly adopted by the players and even appeared on team warmup suits by the middle of the 1982–83 season. The teams were coached by Guy Lewis and featured future Hall of Fame and NBA Top 50 players Hakeem Olajuwon and Clyde Drexler. "Texas' Tallest Fraternity" was especially known for its slam dunking and explosive, fast-breaking style of play. The teams advanced to 3 consecutive NCAA Final Fours, 1982, 1983, and 1984. The 1983 NCAA semi-final of No. 1 Houston vs. No. 2 Louisville, "The Doctors of Dunk", was recognized as one of the 100 greatest basketball moments at the end of the 20th century. The name is trademarked by the University of Houston.

== Philosophy ==
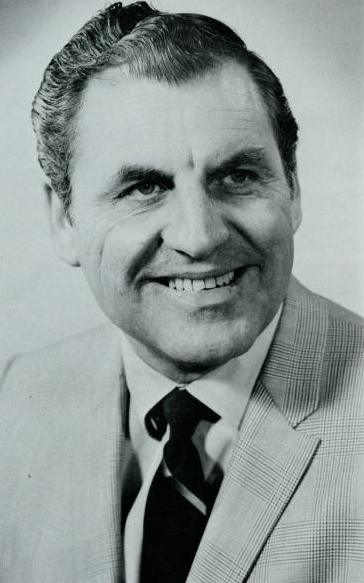
Hall of Fame coach Guy Lewis coached at Houston from 1953 to 1986.

Phi Slama Jama played a frenetic, playground-influenced style of basketball that was in near diametric opposition to the fundamentally polished and methodical style espoused by basketball traditionalists like John Wooden, who disapproved of dunking. Guy Lewis not only condoned his players dunking, he "insisted on it", with dunks being what he called "high-percentage shots."

The young players who made up Phi Slama Jama had been influenced by the freewheeling style of play pioneered during the 1970s by the defunct ABA and its most famous player, Julius Erving. In this paradigm, athleticism took precedence over fundamental skills, fast breaks were preferred to set plays, and dunking trumped the jump shot. In an interview with Thomas Bonk, Clyde Drexler succinctly espoused the Phi Slama Jama philosophy, saying, "Sure, 15-footers are fine, but I like to dunk." The Phi Slama Jama teams were notably poor at free-throw shooting, with some critics attributing their 1983 NCAA Final loss to this deficiency.

== On the court ==
The Phi Slama Jama Cougars advanced to the NCAA Final Four each year from 1982 to 1984. As underclassmen in 1981–82, a young Cougar team lost to the eventual champion North Carolina Tar Heels in the national semifinals.

The 1982–83 season marked the high point of Phi Slama Jama. The Cougars posted an Associated Press #1 ranking, a 31–2 record and a 26-game winning streak before losing in the national championship game of the 1983 NCAA Division I men's basketball tournament. Considered one of the most unlikely upsets in NCAA tournament history, Phi Slama Jama lost a close game against the North Carolina State Wolfpack 54–52, with the final margin decided on a last-second dunk by Wolfpack forward Lorenzo Charles. The NC State surprise national championship win remains a legendary representation of March Madness. Following the season, the Houston Cougars team met with President Ronald Reagan. The president was inducted as an honorary member of the Phi Slama Jama fraternity during a visit to Houston on April 30, 1983.

Despite the early departure of Drexler after the 1982–83 season, Phi Slama Jama continued its success in 1984. Hakeem Olajuwon became the focal point of the team and was selected as a consensus first team All-American. Shooting guard Michael Young was also selected to the All-America team and led the Cougars in scoring for the second consecutive year. The Cougars returned to the Final Four once more, this time losing to the Patrick Ewing-led Georgetown Hoyas in the final. Olajuwon, with one year of eligibility remaining, declared for the NBA draft shortly after the loss in the title game. He was selected first overall by the Houston Rockets in a draft class that included Michael Jordan, Charles Barkley, and John Stockton. Michael Young was also selected in the first round, chosen 24th by the Boston Celtics. The departures of Olajuwon and Young after the 1984 NCAA Final, in addition to the loss of Drexler and Larry Micheaux the previous year, brought the Phi Slama Jama era at Houston to a close.

== Notable team members ==
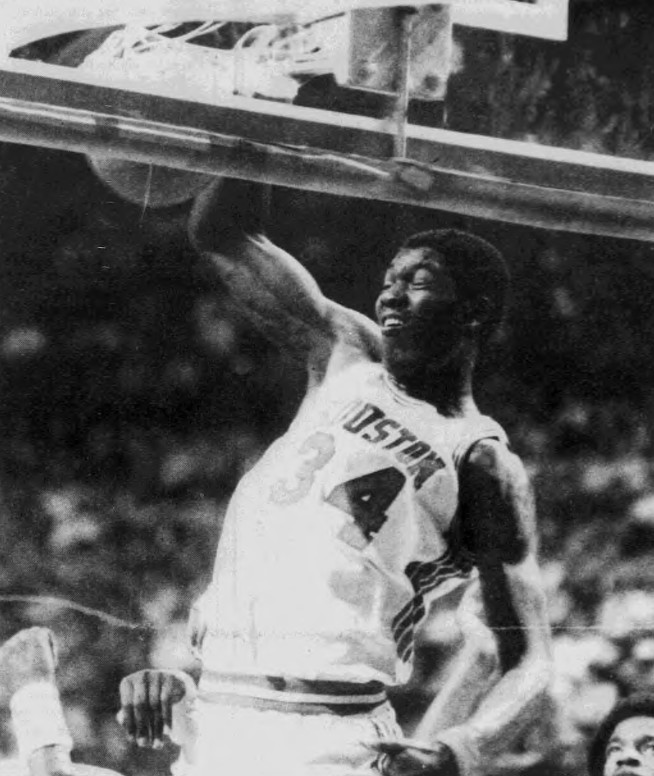
Hakeem Olajuwon as a member of Phi Slama Jama

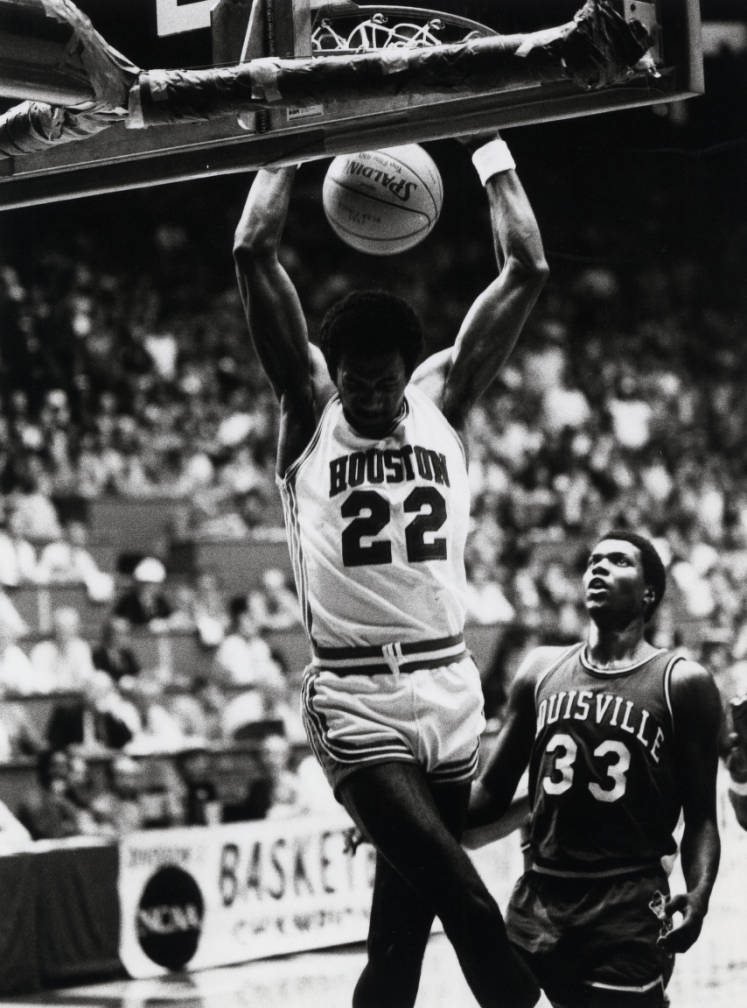
Clyde Drexler as a member of Phi Slama Jama

The team members during the Phi Slama Jama era are listed below, along with the nicknames for which some came to be known.

The team included:

- Rob Williams (1979–82)
- Larry "Mr. Mean" Micheaux (1979–83)
- Lynden Rose (1980–82)
- Clyde "The Glide" Drexler (1980–83)
- Dave Rose (1980–83)
- Michael "The Silent Assassin" Young (1980–84)
- Bryan Williams (1981–83)
- Hakeem "The Dream" Olajuwon (1981–84)
- Benny "The Bomber from Bernice" Anders (1981–84)
- Reid Gettys (1981–85)
- Gary Orsak (1981–85)
- Alvin Franklin (1982–86)
- Renaldo Thomas (1982–86)
- Gregory Wayne "Cadillac" Anderson (1983–87)
- Braxton Clark (1983–85)
- Rickie Winslow (1983–87)

== Impact on the game ==
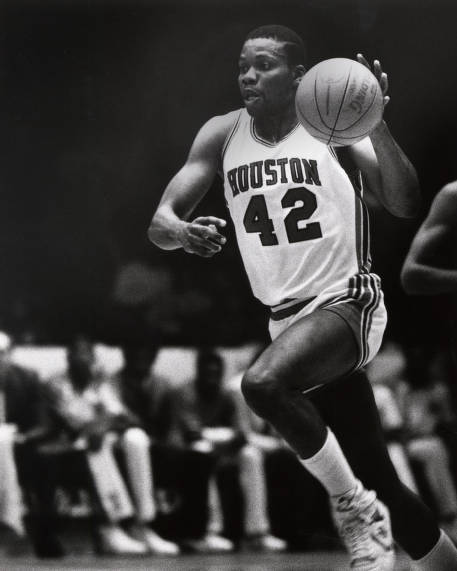
Michael Young during the Phi Slama Jama era

Dunking was banned in the NCAA 1967 to 1976. Many people have attributed this to the dominance of the then-college phenomenon Lew Alcindor (now known as Kareem Abdul-Jabbar); the no-dunking rule is sometimes referred to as the "Lew Alcindor rule." Many others have also attributed the ban as having racial motivations, as at the time most of the prominent dunkers in college basketball were African-American, and the ban took place less than a year after a Texas Western team with an all-black starting lineup beat an all-white Kentucky team to win the national championship. Under head coach Guy Lewis, Houston (with Elvin Hayes) made considerable use of the "stuff" shot on their way to the Final Four in 1967. An invention by Arthur Ehrat to create the breakaway rim with a spring on it led to the return of the dunk in college basketball.

Though it was pioneered largely in the ABA, Phi Slama Jama is widely credited with popularizing the athletic "above the rim" style of play that pervades college basketball to the present day. Phi Slama Jama achieved its greatest prominence at a time when the overall popularity of basketball was burgeoning. Their entertaining style of play appealed to a broad audience, and helped to bring many casual fans to the sport. Olajuwon's international origin foreshadowed the worldwide explosion in the popularity of basketball in the 1980s and 1990s. In light of his unprecedented success, college basketball recruiters fanned out across the globe in search of the next undiscovered superstar. The legacy of Phi Slama Jama has remained at the fore of basketball discourse thanks in large part to the long and distinguished professional careers of Olajuwon and Clyde Drexler.

Having already helped to popularize college basketball with "The Game of the Century" in 1968, the Cougars' 1983 postseason run again helped college basketball in its drive to join the first rank of major sports. The #1 vs. #2 clash of titans between Phi Slama Jama and Louisville's "Doctors of Dunk" in the Final Four served as a preamble to the title game. Phi Slama Jama's title game loss to North Carolina State is widely considered one of their most important contributions to the game of college basketball, vaulting it into the national spotlight. The Cougars' last-second loss in the final was an iconic moment in the history of "March Madness" that helped to establish the NCAA basketball tournament as a major television event. The CBS broadcast of the 1983 final between Houston and NC State drew 18.6 million households and the Houston-Louisville national semifinal attracted 14.8 million, both records at the time for national final and semifinal games.

== 30 for 30 ==
The Phi Slama Jama era at Houston was a focal point for an ESPN 30 for 30 documentary of the same name. Directed by Chip Rives, the film premiered on October 18, 2016, and featured several former members of the Houston basketball team from the Phi Slama Jama era. Included in the film were Clyde Drexler and Hakeem Olajuwon, who would go on to Hall of Fame careers in the NBA and win a championship together on the Houston Rockets in 1995; role players David Rose, Reid Gettys, Cadillac Anderson, and original Phi Slama Jama team captains Lynden Rose and Eric Davis. Media members who participated included original Phi Slama Jama coiner Thomas Bonk, Curry Kirkpatrick, and Brent Musburger. While exploring that larger narrative, Rives also focuses on the disappearance of enigmatic role player Benny Anders and the lasting brotherhood that compels teammates and 1981–82 co-captains Eric Davis and Lynden Rose to try and find him after more than two decades of mystery. UH alum Jim Nantz also appears in the film as he was a member of the student body at the time.
