= Clyde Drexler =

American basketball player (born 1962)

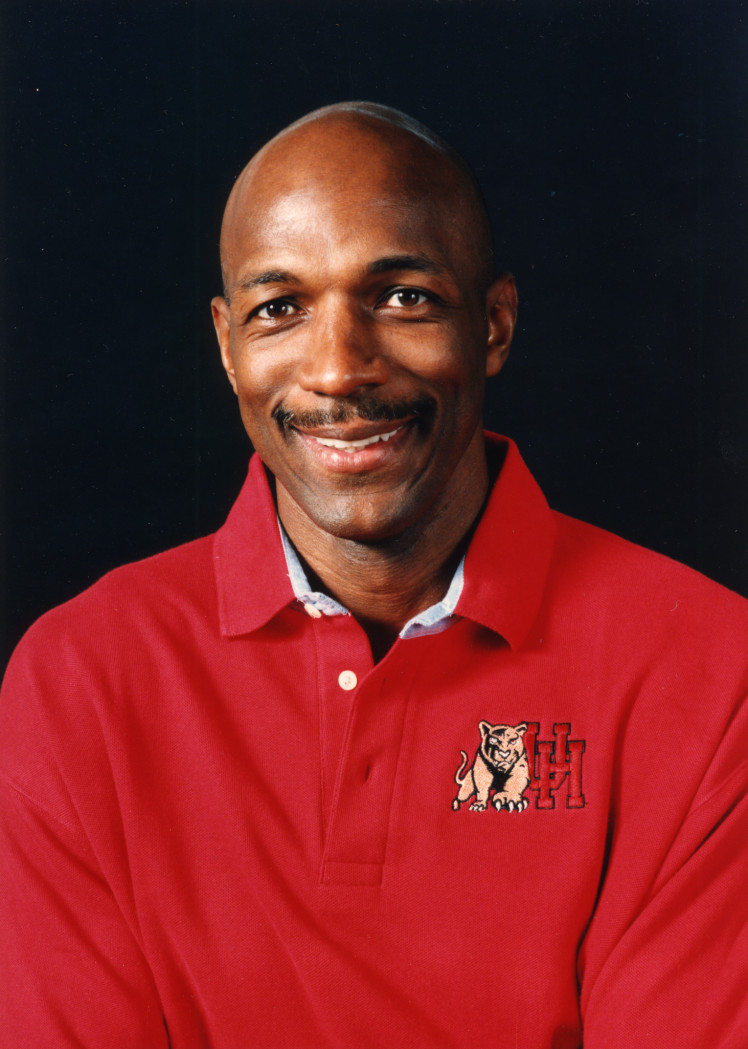
- Drexler at the University of Houston

Personal information
- Born: June 22, 1962 (age 64) New Orleans, Louisiana, U.S.
- Listed height: 6 ft 7 in (2.01 m)
- Listed weight: 222 lb (101 kg)

Career information
- High school: Sterling (Houston, Texas)
- College: Houston (1980–1983)
- NBA draft: 1983: 1st round, 14th overall pick
- Drafted by: Portland Trail Blazers
- Playing career: 1983–1998
- Position: Shooting guard / small forward
- Number: 22
- Coaching career: 1998–2002

Career history

Playing
- 1983–1995: Portland Trail Blazers
- 1995–1998: Houston Rockets

Coaching
- 1998–2000: Houston Cougars
- 2001–2002: Denver Nuggets (assistant)

Career highlights
- NBA champion (1995); 10× NBA All-Star (1986, 1988–1994, 1996, 1997); All-NBA First Team (1992); 2× All-NBA Second Team (1988, 1991); 2× All-NBA Third Team (1990, 1995); NBA anniversary team (50th, 75th); No. 22 retired by Portland Trail Blazers; No. 22 retired by Houston Rockets; Consensus second-team All-American (1983); SWC co-Player of the Year (1983); First-team All-SWC (1983); 2× Second-team All-SWC (1981, 1982); No. 22 retired by Houston Cougars

Career NBA statistics
- Points: 22,195 (20.4 ppg)
- Rebounds: 6,677 (6.1 rpg)
- Assists: 6,125 (5.6 apg)
- Stats at NBA.com
- Stats at Basketball Reference
- Basketball Hall of Fame
- Collegiate Basketball Hall of Fame
Medals
Men's basketball
Representing the United States
Olympic Games
Gold medal – first place	1992 Barcelona	Team competition
FIBA Americas Championship
Gold medal – first place	1992 Portland	Men's basketball

Clyde Austin Drexler Sr. (born June 22, 1962) is an American former professional basketball player who currently serves as the second commissioner of the Big3 3-on-3 basketball league. Nicknamed "Clyde the Glide", he played 15 seasons in the National Basketball Association (NBA), spending a majority of his career with the Portland Trail Blazers before finishing with the Houston Rockets. He was a 10-time NBA All-Star, five-time All-NBA Selection, and was named to the NBA's 50th and 75th anniversary teams. Drexler led Portland to the NBA Finals in 1990 and 1992, won an NBA championship with Houston in 1995, and earned a gold medal on the 1992 United States Olympic team known as "The Dream Team". He was inducted twice into the Naismith Memorial Basketball Hall of Fame, in 2004 for his individual career and in 2010 as a member of the "Dream Team". Drexler is often considered among the top basketball players and top shooting guards of all time.

== Early years ==
Drexler was born in New Orleans, Louisiana, and lived in the South Park area in Houston, Texas. He attended Ross Sterling High School in Houston, where he was a classmate of tennis player Zina Garrison. As a sophomore, he made the varsity baseball team, and tried out for the basketball team but failed to make the cut. Drexler played as a 6 ft 7 in (2.01 m) center as a senior. He began receiving attention from college coaches following a 34-point, 27-rebound performance against Sharpstown High School during a 1979 Christmas tournament.

After graduating in 1980, he was recruited by New Mexico State University, Texas Tech University, and the University of Houston, the latter after childhood friend Michael Young told an assistant to head coach Guy Lewis that Drexler was the best player he had faced in high school. Houston was able to recruit them both due to Drexler's friendship with Young and his desire to stay home. Drexler majored in finance and worked at a bank during the summer. Lewis recalled in 2003 that he initially received hate mail from Houston supporters and alumni for recruiting Drexler, as they felt that he was not good enough to play for the school.

== College career ==
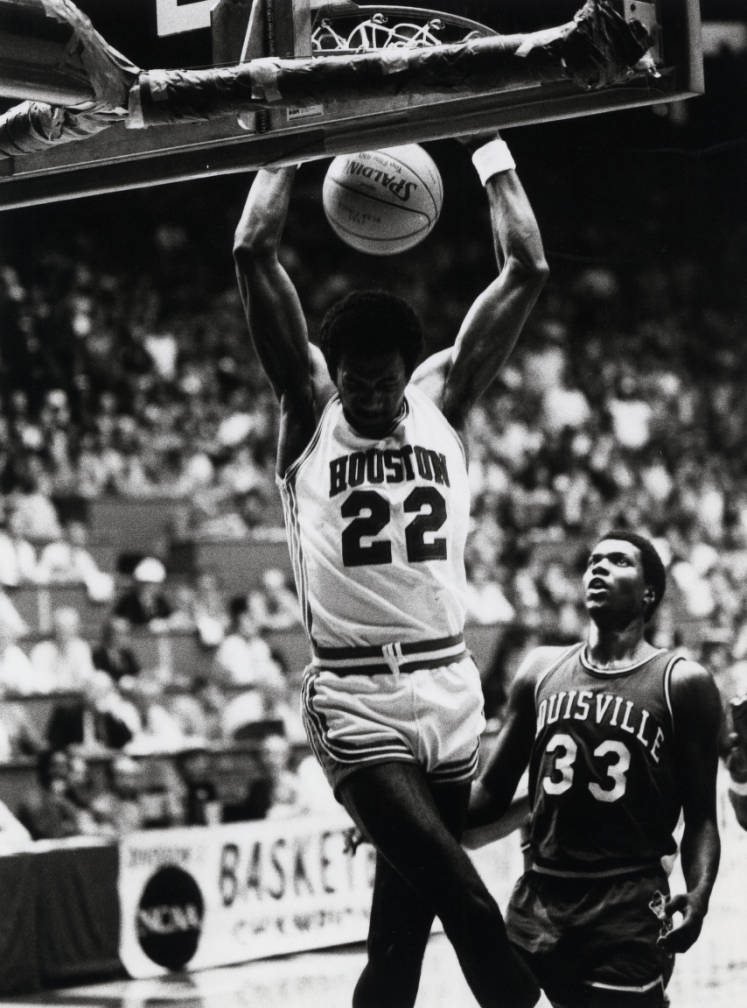
Drexler slam dunks as a member of the Houston Cougars men's basketball team

Drexler and Young, along with Larry Micheaux and new recruit Hakeem Olajuwon (known then as Akeem), comprised the "Phi Slama Jama" basketball fraternity that gained national attention for its acrobatic, above-the-rim play. New players were "initiated" into the fraternity by having to stand underneath the basket as Drexler drove in from halfcourt and threw down a tomahawk slam over them. Houston made the first of Drexler's two straight Final Four appearances in 1982, where they lost to eventual champions North Carolina. He averaged 15.2 points and 10.5 rebounds (second in the Southwest Conference) per game as a small forward as Houston finished 25–8.

The 1982–83 campaign saw Houston return to the Final Four ranked No. 1. They were matched up against No. 2 Louisville and the "Doctors of Dunk" in the semifinals, which Houston won 94–81 following a brilliant dunking display by both sides, including a double-pump slam by Drexler that Sports Illustrated writer Curry Kirkpatrick called "your basic play of the century". He finished with 21 points, seven rebounds and six assists. In the championship game against North Carolina State, Drexler failed to make an impact after picking up four fouls before halftime, and scored only four points on one-of-five shooting and two free throws in NC State's upset victory.

Drexler declared for the NBA draft as a junior, leaving Houston with career averages of 14.4 points, 3.3 assists and 9.9 rebounds in three seasons. In addition to being named the Southwestern Conference Player of the Year and a first-team All-American his final season, he remains the only player in school history with combined totals of at least 1,000 career points, 900 rebounds and 300 assists; he is also Houston's all-time steals leader with 268.

== NBA career ==
=== Portland Trail Blazers (1983–1995) ===
In the 1983 NBA draft, Drexler was selected by the Portland Trail Blazers with the 14th overall pick. He averaged 7.7 points in 17.2 minutes per game in his rookie season. These all improved with more playing time in his second season, to 17.2 points, 6 rebounds, 5.5 assists and 2.2 steals per game. In his third season Drexler made his first All-Star team, averaging 18.5 points, 5.6 rebounds, 8 assists and 2.6 steals. On January 6, 1989, Drexler scored a career-high 50 points during a double-overtime win over the Sacramento Kings.

In the 1989–1990 season, Drexler led the Portland Trail Blazers to the 1990 NBA Finals, averaging 23.3 points, 6.9 rebounds and 5.9 assists during the season. The Blazers (ranked 3rd in the Western Conference) made it to the Conference Finals against the Phoenix Suns. While Drexler only led in scoring in the final two games, the Blazers were bolstered by players such as Terry Porter and Jerome Kersey to a six-game series victory, with Drexler and Porter each scoring 23 in the 112–109 victory that gave Portland its first conference championship since 1977. In the Finals, they played the Detroit Pistons. Drexler led the Blazers with 21 points in Game 1, but they lost 105–99. In Game 2, Drexler scored 33 points and contributed the go-ahead points in overtime by hitting two free throws with 2.1 seconds to beat Detroit 106–105. It was the only win in the series for the Blazers, who lost narrowly in Game 4 by three and lost the final game after Detroit went on a 9–0 run. During the 1990–1991 season, Drexler led Portland to a franchise-best 63–19 record. He played in every game for the first time in four seasons and averaged 21.5 points per game while having 6.7 rebounds and six assists on average. Heavily favored to win the West, the Los Angeles Lakers upset the Trail Blazers by winning the Western Conference Finals.

In the 1991–92 season he made the All-NBA First Team and finished second to Michael Jordan in MVP voting, having averaged 25 points per game to go with 6.6 rebounds and 6.7 assists while playing slightly over 35 minutes a game; the Blazers finished 57–25, best in the Western Conference. The Blazers lost just twice in the first two rounds of the postseason. In the Conference Finals, they faced the Utah Jazz. Teammate Terry Porter cited Drexler decades later as the key guy to get the ball to when it came down to late in a game to make plays. Portland won the first two games at home before Utah responded with two victories in Utah. In Game 5, Portland won in overtime to set up a Game 6 in Utah. Porter and Drexler each scored 18 points in the pivotal Game 6 that the Blazers won 105–97 to clinch their second conference championship in three years. Drexler and the Blazers met Jordan and the Chicago Bulls in the 1992 NBA Finals. In the Finals, Drexler was the leader or tied for the lead in scoring for the Blazers in each of the six games, leading all scorers once in Game 3 with 32 points in a 94–84 loss. Despite forcing a tie series twice, the Bulls pulled a comeback in the fourth quarter to turn a 15-point deficit into a win that clinched the series. In the six-game series against Chicago, Drexler averaged 24.8 points, 7.8 rebounds and 5.3 assists per game. Later that year, he was selected to the U.S. Olympic basketball team, nicknamed "The Dream Team", which won the gold medal in Barcelona.

Drexler left as the all-time scoring leader for the Blazers with 18,040 points, which stood as a franchise record until Damian Lillard passed him in 2022.

=== Houston Rockets (1995–1998) ===
On February 14, 1995, with the Blazers out of serious contention for a championship, Portland honored Drexler's request to be traded to a contender. They sent the Blazer great back home to the Houston Rockets, along with Tracy Murray in exchange for Otis Thorpe, the draft rights of Marcelo Nicola, and a 1995 first-round draft pick, right before the trade deadline. Despite finishing the regular season with a record of 47–35, which placed the Rockets 6th out of 8 playoff teams in the Western Conference, Drexler and long-time friend Hakeem Olajuwon helped propel them to an improbable second consecutive championship in 1995. On May 5, during the first round while down two games to one against the Utah Jazz, Drexler led the Rockets in scoring with 41 points while Olajuwon added 40 in a 123–106 win. Houston would go on to win the deciding Game 5, and then also win every remaining elimination game on their postseason run. In the finals, the Rockets swept the Orlando Magic. In his third and final NBA Finals appearance, Drexler averaged 21.5 points, 9.5 rebounds and 6.8 assists per game.

Drexler played his last three full seasons with the Rockets. The 1995–96 season saw him average 19.3 points per game in 52 games played, owing to knee and ankle injuries. The Rockets dispatched their first-round opponent in the Lakers to face the Seattle SuperSonics. Drexler led the team in a variety of categories in the series such as rebounds (twice), points (twice), and assists (once), but the Sonics eliminated the Rockets in four games. Prior to the start of the NBA season, the Rockets won the 1995 McDonald's Championship, with Drexler being named the tournament's MVP.

In the 1996-97 season, the Rockets, having traded for Charles Barkley before the year started, went 21–2 to begin the year, but injuries would pile on the team, with Drexler having a hamstring injury; he was named to the All-Star Game, but he did not play in what ended up as his final selection. Drexler played a total of 62 games while averaging eighteen points a game with six rebounds and 5.7 assists. The Rockets finished 57–25 and made it all the way to the Conference Finals against the Jazz. The Rockets forced six games after winning Game 3 and 4, but the Jazz won in six to end the season.

The 1997–98 season was his final season in the NBA. He played in 70 games and averaged 18.4 points a game with 4.9 rebounds (his lowest since his rookie year) and 5.5 assists. These totals led the team (as Olajuwon played less due to injury), which staggered to a 41–41 record and a playoff spot. The Rockets played the Jazz in the opening round and held a series lead going into Game 4, but an injury to Barkley spelled the end of their chances, as Utah rallied to send Houston home in five games, the first opening round loss for Houston since 1991.

Drexler retired at the age of 35, stating his reason as doing so because of his desire to leave on his own terms while still playing at a "high level". At the time of his retirement, Drexler was one of only three players in history with 20,000 points, 6,000 assists and 6,000 rebounds. In fifteen seasons, he never missed the playoffs.

== NBA career statistics ==
Legend
GP	Games played	GS	Games started	MPG	Minutes per game
FG%	Field goal percentage	3P%	3-point field goal percentage	FT%	Free throw percentage
RPG	Rebounds per game	APG	Assists per game	SPG	Steals per game
BPG	Blocks per game	PPG	Points per game	**Bold**	Career high
†	Won an NBA championship

=== Regular season ===
Year	Team	GP	GS	MPG	FG%	3P%	FT%	RPG	APG	SPG	BPG	PPG
1983–84	Portland	**82**	3	17.2	.451	.250	.728	2.9	1.9	1.3	.4	7.7
1984–85	Portland	80	43	31.9	.494	.216	.759	6.0	5.5	2.2	**.9**	17.2
1985–86	Portland	75	58	34.3	.475	.200	.769	5.6	**8.0**	2.6	.6	18.5
1986–87	Portland	**82**	**82**	38.0	.502	.234	.760	6.3	6.9	2.5	**.9**	21.7
1987–88	Portland	81	80	37.8	**.506**	.212	.811	6.6	5.8	2.5	.6	27.0
1988–89	Portland	78	78	**39.3**	.496	.260	.799	**7.9**	5.8	**2.7**	.7	**27.2**
1989–90	Portland	73	73	36.8	.494	.283	.774	6.9	5.9	2.0	.7	23.3
1990–91	Portland	**82**	**82**	34.8	.482	.319	.794	6.7	6.0	1.8	.7	21.5
1991–92	Portland	76	76	36.2	.470	.337	.794	6.6	6.7	1.8	**.9**	25.0
1992–93	Portland	49	49	34.1	.429	.233	**.839**	6.3	5.7	1.9	.8	19.9
1993–94	Portland	68	68	34.3	.428	.324	.777	6.5	4.9	1.4	.5	19.2
1994–95	Portland	41	41	34.8	.428	**.363**	.835	5.7	5.1	1.8	.5	22.0
1994–95†	Houston	35	34	37.1	**.506**	.357	.809	7.0	4.4	1.8	.7	21.4
1995–96	Houston	52	51	38.4	.433	.332	.784	7.2	5.8	2.0	.5	19.3
1996–97	Houston	62	62	36.6	.442	.355	.750	6.0	5.7	1.9	.6	18.0
1997–98	Houston	70	70	35.3	.427	.317	.801	4.9	5.5	1.8	.6	18.4
Career		1,086	950	34.6	.472	.318	.788	6.1	5.6	2.0	.7	20.4
All-Star		9	4	18.4	.506	.286	1.000	4.9	2.6	1.3	.7	10.7

=== Playoffs ===
Year	Team	GP	GS	MPG	FG%	3P%	FT%	RPG	APG	SPG	BPG	PPG
1984	Portland	5	—	17.0	.429	.000	**.857**	3.4	1.6	1.0	.2	7.2
1985	Portland	9	9	37.7	.410	.286	.844	6.1	**9.2**	2.6	**1.0**	16.7
1986	Portland	4	4	36.3	.456	.400	.783	6.3	6.5	1.5	.8	18.0
1987	Portland	4	4	38.3	.456	.250	.793	7.5	3.8	1.8	.8	24.0
1988	Portland	4	4	42.5	.386	**.500**	.724	7.0	5.3	**3.0**	.5	22.0
1989	Portland	3	3	**42.7**	**.493**	.000	.765	6.7	8.3	2.0	.7	**27.7**
1990	Portland	21	21	40.6	.441	.220	.774	7.2	7.1	2.5	.9	21.4
1991	Portland	16	16	39.6	.476	.268	.776	8.1	8.1	2.1	**1.0**	21.7
1992	Portland	21	21	40.3	.466	.235	.807	7.4	7.0	1.5	**1.0**	26.3
1993	Portland	3	3	38.7	.419	.417	.800	6.3	4.7	1.7	**1.0**	19.0
1994	Portland	4	4	39.3	.425	.231	.826	**10.3**	5.5	2.0	.5	21.0
1995†	Houston	**22**	**22**	38.6	.481	.303	.786	7.0	5.0	1.5	.7	20.5
1996	Houston	8	8	36.5	.415	.265	.765	7.8	5.0	2.6	.5	16.6
1997	Houston	16	16	38.9	.436	.373	.778	5.6	4.8	1.6	.4	18.1
1998	Houston	5	5	36.4	.309	.192	.757	5.4	4.6	1.6	.6	15.0
Career		145	140	38.4	.447	.288	.787	6.9	6.1	1.9	.7	20.4

== Awards ==
- First-team NCAA All-American (1983)
- Southwest Conference Player of the Year (1983)
- 10-time NBA All-Star (1986, 1988–1994, 1996, 1997)
- All-NBA First Team (1992)
- All-NBA Second Team (1988, 1991)
- All-NBA Third Team (1990, 1995)
- Olympic gold medalist (1992)
- NBA championship (1995)
- McDonald's Championship winner (1995)
- McDonald's Championship MVP (1995)
- Named one of the 50 Greatest Players in NBA History (1996)
- Two-time Naismith Memorial Basketball Hall of Fame Inductee
- Oregon Sports Hall of Fame Inducted (2001)
- Named to the NBA 75th Anniversary Team (2021)

== NBA records ==
=== Regular season ===
Most steals in a half: 8, second half, Houston Rockets vs. Sacramento Kings, November 1, 1996

Most offensive rebounds by a guard in a career: 2,615 Blocks: 4 vs Utah Jazz May 9, 1991 Clyde Drexler | Portland Trail Blazers

=== Playoffs ===
Most steals in a 3-game series: 13, Portland Trail Blazers vs. Dallas Mavericks, 1990 Western Conference First round

Most steals in a half: 6, Portland Trail Blazers vs. Phoenix Suns, May 23, 1990

=== All-Star Game ===
Highest free throw percentage for a career: 1.000 (12–12)

== Player profile ==
Clyde "The Glide" Drexler, as he was nicknamed at the University of Houston and throughout his professional career, was famed for his speed and athleticism on the court and his easygoing and quiet demeanor off the court. At the University of Houston, Drexler became well known for his exceptional abilities as a finisher, but generally was not considered a great shooter. During his pro career Drexler developed a much more well-rounded game, even becoming an effective post player and more consistent outside shooter. His extraordinary leaping abilities allowed him to be an acrobatic dunker and Drexler participated in numerous NBA All-Star dunk contests during the late eighties.

Drexler was regarded as a versatile player, and he was consistently among the leaders at his position in points, rebounds, assists, and steals. He also posted a considerable number of blocked shots for a player his size, ranking third for his career totals among guards.

Drexler set a Trail Blazer record in 1989 by dunking on an 11' 1" rim.

As of 2008, Drexler leads all guards with his career average of offensive rebounds with 2.4 per game.

In 2021, to commemorate the NBA's 75th Anniversary The Athletic ranked their top 75 players of all time, and named Drexler as the 43rd greatest player in NBA history.

== College coaching career ==
After retiring from the NBA following the 1997–98 season, he became the head men's basketball coach at his alma mater, the University of Houston.

Drexler coached the Cougars in the 1998–99 and 1999–2000 seasons. After compiling a 19–39 record in his two seasons, Drexler decided to resign to spend more time with his family.

=== Head coaching record ===
Record table
Season	Team	Overall	Conference	Standing	Postseason
Houston Cougars (Conference USA) (1998–2000)
1998–99	Houston	10–17	5–11	6th (National)	
1999–00	Houston	9–22	2–14	6th (National)	
Houston:		19–39 (.327)	7–25 (.219)		
Total:		19–39 (.327)			
National champion Postseason invitational champion Conference regular season champion Conference regular season and conference tournament champion Division regular season champion Division regular season and conference tournament champion Conference tournament champion

== Honors ==
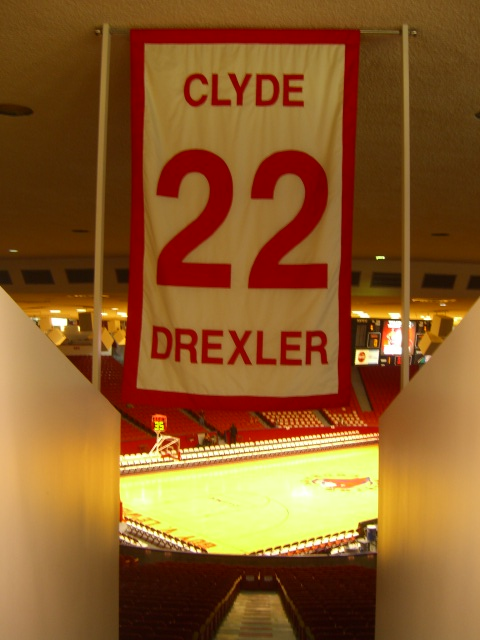
One of only five numbers retired by the University of Houston men's basketball team, Drexler's No. 22 hangs in the Fertitta Center.

Drexler's No. 22 jersey has been retired by the Cougars (pictured), Rockets, and Trail Blazers. He was inducted as a player into the Naismith Memorial Basketball Hall of Fame on September 10, 2004, in his first year of eligibility. He was named one of the 50 Greatest Players in NBA History in 1996 and named to the league's 75th anniversary team in 2021.

In 2004 Drexler co-authored his biography, Clyde the Glide, with Portland Tribune sports writer Kerry Eggers, and University of Houston classmate and CBS Sports broadcaster Jim Nantz providing the foreword.

== Personal life ==
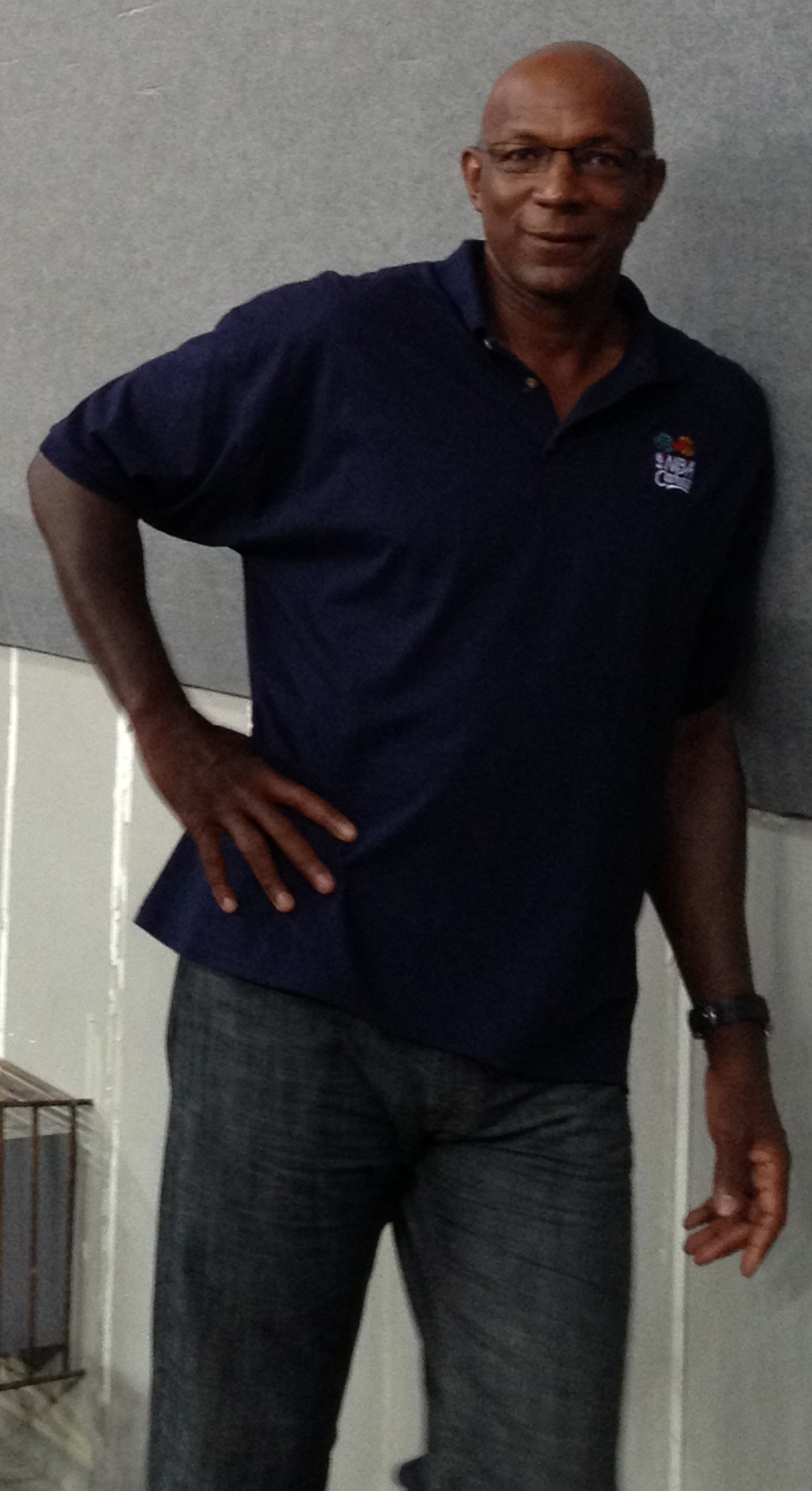
Drexler poses during NBA Global Games in the Philippines in 2013

Drexler married his wife, Gaynell, on December 30, 1988. They divorced in 2011. He has four children: Erica, Clyde "Austin" Jr., Elise, and Adam (the last three with Gaynell). In 2014, Drexler married his second wife, Tonya, whom he had met through fellow NBA star Dominique Wilkins. Drexler has owned homes in the River Oaks–Memorial neighborhood of Houston and in the Dunthorpe suburb of Portland.

His brother James and his two sisters, Denise and Virginia, once ran the family barbecue restaurants in Houston called Drexler's World Famous BBQ & Grill, which included the "22 Bar". His mother, Eunice Scott, also worked at the downtown restaurant that was started by his uncle in 1967. There were two locations, downtown Houston and Bush Intercontinental Airport, that have since closed. Drexler also started investing in real estate in his rookie NBA season, and although he is now mostly retired, he does do some managing of his Drexler Holdings LLC, based in downtown Houston.

== Books ==
Drexler is the subject of the book Clyde Drexler: Clyde the Glide. He also wrote the introduction to the children's book Shrews Can't Hoop.

== TV appearances ==
Drexler made a guest appearance on Married... with Children, a cameo appearance in an episode of Arliss, and was also a guest star in an episode of The Sentinel. In 2006, he made a cameo appearance in the basketball movie Like Mike 2: Streetball. That same year, Drexler participated in the first season of the Spike TV show Pros vs. Joes, which features three amateur contestants matching themselves against five professional athletes. Drexler was a member of the regular season Green Team and the season finale Orange Team.

On February 21, 2007, it was announced that Drexler would participate in the fourth season of the American version of Dancing with the Stars with partner Elena Grinenko. Drexler was the fourth celebrity to be voted off in round five on April 17, 2007.

On April 11, 2010, Drexler appeared as a guest on NBC's Celebrity Apprentice in which he helped the men's team "Rock Solid" complete a task to create video advertisements for Right Guard.

== See also ==
- List of NBA career scoring leaders
- List of NBA franchise career scoring leaders
- List of NBA career assists leaders
- List of NBA career steals leaders
- List of NBA career turnovers leaders
- List of NBA career personal fouls leaders
- List of NBA career free throw scoring leaders
- List of NBA career triple-double leaders
- List of NBA career playoff scoring leaders
- List of NBA career playoff assists leaders
- List of NBA career playoff steals leaders
- List of NBA career playoff turnovers leaders
- List of NBA career playoff triple-double leaders
- List of NBA single-game steals leaders
