= Michael Young (basketball, born 1961) =

American basketball player

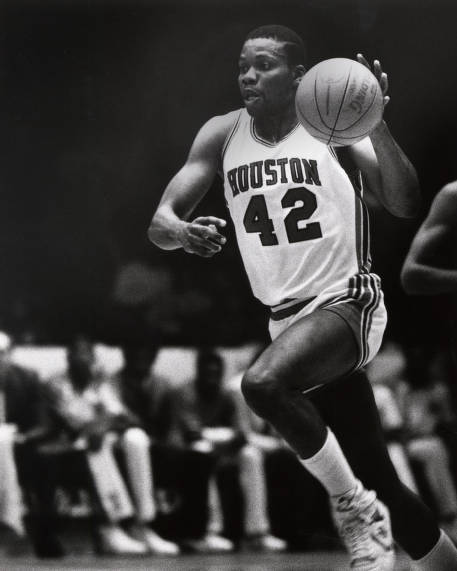
- Young with the Houston Cougars in the 1980s

Personal information
- Born: January 2, 1961 (age 65) Houston, Texas, U.S.
- Listed height: 6 ft 7 in (2.01 m)
- Listed weight: 220 lb (100 kg)

Career information
- High school: Yates (Houston, Texas)
- College: Houston (1980–1984)
- NBA draft: 1984: 1st round, 24th overall pick
- Drafted by: Boston Celtics
- Playing career: 1984–1996
- Position: Small forward / shooting guard
- Number: 43, 8, 42
- Coaching career: 2003–2004

Career history

Playing
- 1984: Phoenix Suns
- 1984–1986: Detroit Spirits
- 1986: Philadelphia 76ers
- 1986: Manila Beer Brewmasters
- 1987: Great Taste Coffee Makers
- 1987–1989: Valladolid
- 1989: Fantoni Udine
- 1989–1990: Los Angeles Clippers
- 1990: Sioux Falls Skyforce
- 1990–1992: Panasonic Reggio Calabria
- 1992–1995: Limoges
- 1995–1996: Faber Fabriano
- 1996: CRO Lyon

Coaching
- 2003–2004: Houston (assistant)

Career highlights
- EuroLeague champion (1993); Spanish All-Star Game MVP (1988); Italian League Top Scorer (1991); 2× French League Foreign MVP (1993, 1994); CBA Most Valuable Player (1986); All-CBA First Team (1986); Third-team All-American – AP, NABC, UPI (1984); 2× First-team All-SWC (1983, 1984); No. 42 retired by Houston Cougars
- Stats at NBA.com
- Stats at Basketball Reference

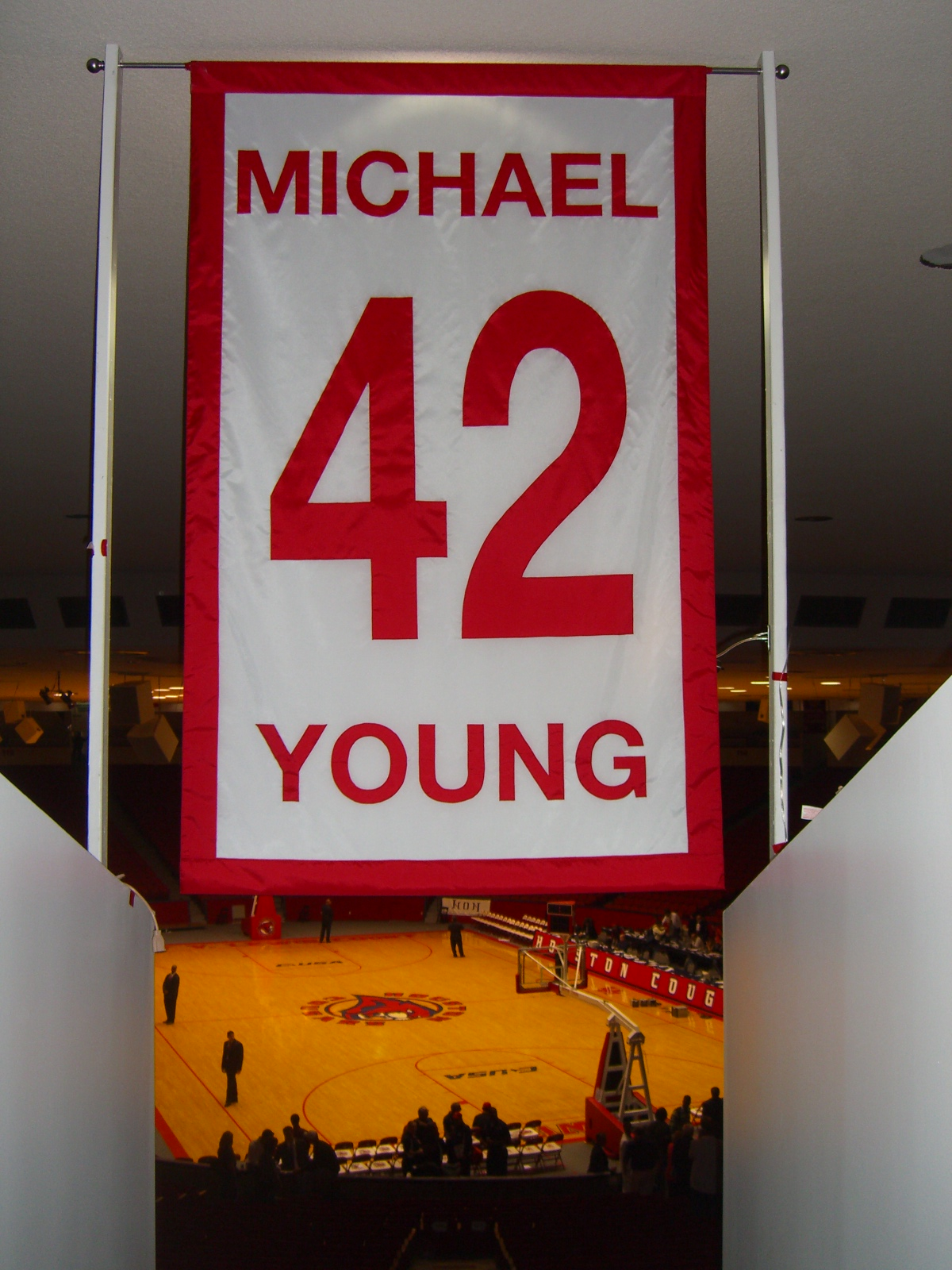
Young's #42 was retired at Hofheinz Pavilion on December 18, 2007.

Michael Wayne Young (born January 2, 1961) is an American former professional basketball player. Nicknamed "the Silent Assassin", he had a 12-year playing career spent in the National Basketball Association (NBA) and overseas. He was most recently the director of basketball operations and performance enhancement at the University of Houston, his alma mater.

== College career ==
Young, a native Houstonian, played basketball at Yates High School and the University of Houston. With the Houston Cougars, he was part of Phi Slama Jama and was twice named to the Southwest Conference First Team. He played in the 1983 NCAA Final, a loss to the North Carolina State Wolfpack, as well as the 1984 final, a loss to the Georgetown Hoyas.

== Professional career ==
=== NBA and CBA ===
Michael Young was selected by the Boston Celtics with the 24th overall pick (1st round) of the 1984 NBA draft.

He played in three NBA seasons: 1984–85 with the Phoenix Suns, 1985–86 with the Philadelphia 76ers, and 1989–90 with the Los Angeles Clippers. He also played two seasons with the Continental Basketball Association's Detroit Spirit, where he was named the CBA's Player of the Year in 1986 after averaging 26 points per game.

=== Overseas ===
Young also played in the Philippines, Spain, Italy, France and Israel. In 1986, he led Manila Beer to the finals of the Philippine Basketball Association Open Conference, losing to the Ginebra San Miguel team led by Billy Ray Bates. Young, however, won Best Import honors over the highly favored Bates. He would return the following year, this time with the Great Taste Coffee Makers, which he led to another runner-up finish to Tanduay Rhum, led by David Thirdkill.

While with the French League's Limoges, he won the 1993 European Club Championship, the EuroLeague.

== Post-playing career ==
Young concluded his playing career in 1998 before returning to the University of Houston. He spent one season as an assistant men's basketball coach and five years as Houston's strength and conditioning coach. He then became the director of basketball operations and performance enhancement.

== Personal life ==
Young earned a bachelor's degree from the University of Houston in 2002. He and his wife, Tina, have five children: Michael Jr., Joe, Mayorca, Jacob and Milan Maria. Joe played college basketball for Houston and Oregon and followed his father's footsteps to the NBA in 2015 as a member of the Indiana Pacers. His youngest son, Jacob, played at the University of Texas and Rutgers before also transferring to Oregon. In 2025, Young became the head coach at the College of Biblical Studies in Houston, Tx.

== Career statistics ==
Legend
| GP | Games played | GS | Games started | MPG | Minutes per game |
| FG% | Field goal percentage | 3P% | 3-point field goal percentage | FT% | Free throw percentage |
| RPG | Rebounds per game | APG | Assists per game | SPG | Steals per game |
| BPG | Blocks per game | PPG | Points per game | **Bold** | Career high |

=== NBA ===
==== Regular season ====
| Year | Team | GP | GS | MPG | FG% | 3P% | FT% | RPG | APG | SPG | BPG | PPG |
|---|---|---|---|---|---|---|---|---|---|---|---|---|
| 1984–85 | Phoenix | 2 | 0 | 5.5 | .333 | .000 | – | 1.0 | .0 | .0 | .0 | 2.0 |
| 1985–86 | Philadelphia | 2 | 0 | 1.0 | .000 | – | – | .0 | .0 | .0 | .0 | .0 |
| 1989–90 | L.A. Clippers | **45** | **2** | **10.2** | **.474** | **.308** | **.711** | **1.9** | **.5** | **.6** | **.1** | **4.9** |
| Career | | 49 | 2 | 9.6 | .465 | .296 | .711 | 1.8 | .5 | .5 | .1 | 4.6 |

==== Playoffs ====
| Year | Team | GP | GS | MPG | FG% | 3P% | FT% | RPG | APG | SPG | BPG | PPG |
|---|---|---|---|---|---|---|---|---|---|---|---|---|
| 1986 | Philadelphia | 3 | 0 | 1.0 | .250 | – | – | .3 | .0 | .0 | .0 | .7 |

== See also ==
- List of second-generation NBA players
