= 1984–85 Big East Conference men's basketball season =

American college basketball season

1984–85 Big East Conference Men's Basketball Season
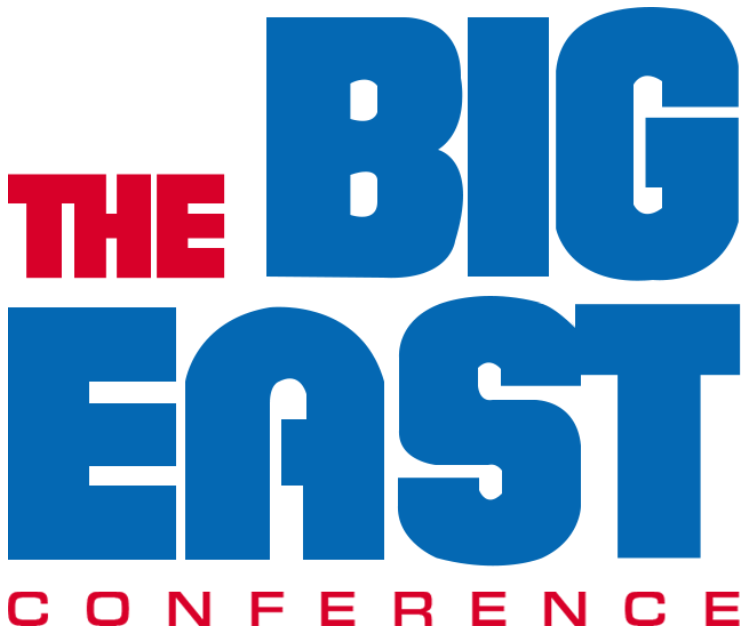
- League: NCAA Division I
- Sport: Basketball
- Duration: November 23, 1984 through March 10, 1985
- Teams: 9
- TV partner: ESPN

Regular Season
- Champion: St. John's (15–1)
- Season MVP: Patrick Ewing – Georgetown; Chris Mullin – St. John's

Tournament
- Champions: Georgetown
- Finals MVP: Patrick Ewing – Georgetown

Basketball seasons
- 1983–84 1985–86

1984–85 Big East men's basketball standings
	Conf.				Overall
Team	W		L	PCT	W		L	PCT
No. 3 St. John's	15	–	1	.938	31	–	4	.886
No. 1 Georgetown†	14	–	2	.875	35	–	3	.921
No. 15 Syracuse	9	–	7	.563	22	–	9	.710
Villanova	9	–	7	.563	25	–	10	.714
Pittsburgh	8	–	8	.500	17	–	12	.586
Boston College	7	–	9	.438	20	–	11	.645
Connecticut	6	–	10	.375	13	–	15	.464
Providence	3	–	13	.188	11	–	20	.355
Seton Hall	1	–	15	.063	10	–	18	.357
† 1985 Big East tournament winner As of April 1, 1985; Rankings from AP Poll

The 1984–85 Big East Conference men's basketball season was the sixth in conference history, and involved its nine full-time member schools.

St. John's won its third regular season championship. Georgetown won its third Big East tournament championship. St. John's, Georgetown, and Villanova all advanced to the Final Four, and Villanova defeated Georgetown for the national championship in a major upset.

== Season summary & highlights ==
- Georgetown and St. John's met four times, in each case with one team ranked No. 1 and the other No. 2 or No. 3. In the first meeting on January 26 at a sold-out Capital Centre, No. 2 St. John's upset the No. 1 Hoyas, breaking a 29-game Georgetown winning streak with St. John's coach Lou Carnesecca wearing an old sweater to keep warm while suffering from a common cold. It became his "lucky sweater," and he wore it at every game that followed as the Redmen won another ten games in a row. With their rivalry at its peak, the two teams then met at a sold-out Madison Square Garden on February 27 with St. John's ranked No. 1 and the Hoyas No. 2. When Carnesecca — wearing his sweater — and Georgetown coach John Thompson, Jr., met courtside for a pregame handshake, Thompson opened his coat to reveal that he was wearing a replica T-shirt of Carnesecca's sweater, drawing a roar of laughter from the crowd. Georgetown went on to end the Redmen's winning streak with an 85–69 victory in a nationally televised game that went down in the history of both schools as "The Sweater Game."
- In a game at the Carrier Dome in Syracuse, New York, on January 28, Syracuse upset the No. 1-ranked Hoyas 65–63 on a game-winning jumper by Pearl Washington with seven seconds left. prompting celebrating Syracuse fans to rush the court. It was Syracuse's first-ever victory over a No. 1-ranked team.
- St. John's won its third regular season championship with a 15–1 record.
- Georgetown won its third Big East tournament championship.
- St. John's, Georgetown, and Villanova all advanced to the Final Four. It was the first Final Four appearance for St. John's since 1952.
- Georgetown reached the national championship game for the fourth time in school history and third time in four years.
- Georgetown was the heavy favorite to defeat Villanova in the national championship game and win a second-straight national championship. Exceeding expectations, Villanova had a storybook tournament, advancing from a No. 8 seed in the Southeast Region and upsetting Michigan, Maryland, and North Carolina to reach the championship game. Georgetown shot 29-for-53 (55%) from the field, probably enough to win most games, but Villanova set an NCAA record for team shooting percentage from the field in a single game, shooting 22-for-28 (78.6%) from the field and 22-for-27 (81.5%) from the free-throw line. After halftime, the Wildcats shot 90% from the field, missing only one field goal attempt in the entire second half. The record-breaking performance earned Villanova a two-point victory, defeating the Hoyas 66–64 in what many observers regard as perhaps the biggest upset in American sports history.
- St. John's senior forward Chris Mullin was the 1985 NCAA Tournament's top scorer.
- Villanova senior forward Ed Pinckney was the 1985 NCAA Tournament's Most Outstanding Player.
- Georgetown finished the season ranked No. 1 and set a new school record for victories in a season with 35 wins, breaking the record of 34 set the previous season.

== Head coaches ==
School	Coach	Season	Notes
Boston College	Gary Williams	3rd	
Connecticut	Dom Perno	8th	
Georgetown	John Thompson, Jr.	13th	
Pittsburgh	Roy Chipman	5th	
Providence	Joe Mullaney	18th	Retired March 7, 1985
St. John's	Lou Carnesecca	17th	Big East Coach of the Year (2nd award)
Seton Hall	P. J. Carlesimo	3rd	
Syracuse	Jim Boeheim	9th	
Villanova	Rollie Massimino	12th	

== Rankings ==
Georgetown was ranked No. 1 in the Top 20 of the Associated Press poll for the entire season except for a five-week stretch when St. John's took the No.1 spot and Georgetown fell to No 2. St. John's never fell below No. 8 all season and spent all but two weeks in the top five, and Syracuse also spent the entire season in the Top 20, reaching as high as No. 7. Boston College and Villanova also appeared in the Top 20.

1984–85 Big East Conference Weekly Rankings Key: ██ Increase in ranking. ██ Decrease in ranking.
AP Poll	Pre	11/26	12/3	12/10	12/17	12/24	12/31	1/7	1/14	1/21	1/28	2/4	2/11	2/18	2/25	3/4	Final
Boston College								12	15				20				
Connecticut																	
Georgetown	1	1	1	1	1	1	1	1	1	1	2	2	2	2	2	1	1
Pittsburgh																	
Providence																	
St. John's	7	3	3	4	8	5	4	3	4	2	1	1	1	1	1	2	3
Seton Hall																	
Syracuse	12	14	12	10	9	6	5	7	7	11	9	6	8	7	12	13	15
Villanova								16	18	14	19	18	16				

== Regular-season statistical leaders ==
Scoring
Name	School	PPG
Andre McCloud	SHU	20.8
Chris Mullin	SJU	22.1
Rafael Addison	Syr	18.4
Walter Berry	SJU	17.0
Earl Kelley	Conn	16.8

Rebounding
Name	School	RPG
Patrick Ewing	GU	9.2
Ed Pinckney	Vill	8.9
Walter Berry	SJU	8.7
Charles Smith	Pitt	8.0
Harold Pressley	Vill	7.9

Assists
Name	School	APG
Michael Jackson	GU	6.7
Pearl Washington	Syr	6.1
Michael Adams	BC	5.2
Earl Kelley	Conn	4.8
Chris Mullin	SJU	4.3

Steals
Name	School	SPG
Michael Adams	BC	2.3
Chris Mullin	SJU	2.1
Pearl Washington	Syr	2.0
Harold Starks	Prov	2.0
Dominic Pressley	BC	1.7

Blocks
Name	School	BPG
Patrick Ewing	GU	3.6
Charles Smith	Pitt	2.2
Rony Seikaly	Syr	1.9
Ed Pinckney	Vill	1.8
Ray Knight	Prov	1.8

Field Goals
Name	School	FG%
Patrick Ewing	GU	.625
Ed Pinckney	Vill	.600
Dwayne McClain	Vill	.574
Walter Berry	SJU	.558
Ray Broxton	Conn	.552

Free Throws
Name	School	FT%
Earl Kelley	Conn	.856
Chris Mullin	SJU	.824
Bill Wennington	SJU	.816
Pearl Washington	Syr	.784
Dwayne McClain	Vill	.774

== Postseason ==
=== Big East tournament ===
==== Seeding ====
Seeding in the Big East tournament was based on conference record, with tiebreakers applied as necessary. The eighth- and ninth-seeded teams played a first-round game, and the other seven teams received a bye into the quarterfinals.

The tournament's seeding was as follows: (1) St. John's, (2) Georgetown, (3) Syracuse, (4) Villanova, (5) Pittsburgh, (6) Boston College, (7) Connecticut, (8) Providence, (9) Seton Hall.

==== Bracket ====
First round March 6, 1985
8	Providence	77^{OT}
9	Seton Hall	75

Quarterfinals; March 7, 1985
1	2 St. John's	90
8	Providence	62
4	Villanova	69
5	Pittsburgh	61
2	1 Georgetown	93
7	Connecticut	62
3	13 Syracuse	70
6	Boston College	69

Semifinals; March 8, 1985
1	2 St. John's	89
4	Villanova	74
2	1 Georgetown	74
3	13 Syracuse	65

Championship Game; March 9, 1985
1	2 St. John's	80
2	1 Georgetown	92

=== NCAA tournament ===
Six Big East teams received bids to the NCAA Tournament, with Georgetown seeded No. 1 in the East Region and St. John's No. 1 in the West region. Pittsburgh lost in the first round, Syracuse in the second round, and Boston College in the regional semifinals, but Georgetown, St. John's, and Villanova all advanced to the Final Four. Georgetown defeated St. John's in the national semifinals and played in the championship game for the fourth time in school history and the third time in four seasons. In a major upset, Villanova defeated Georgetown for the national championship. St. John's senior forward Chris Mullin was the tournament's top scorer with 110 points, and Villanova senior forward Ed Pinckney was the tournament's Most Outstanding Player.

School	Region	Seed	Round 1	Round 2	Sweet 16	Elite 8	Final 4	Final
Villanova	Southeast	8	9 Dayton, W 51–49	1 Michigan, W 59–55	9 Maryland, W 46–43	9 North Carolina, W 56–44	MW2 Memphis State, W 52–45	E1 Georgetown, W 66–64
Georgetown	East	1	16 Lehigh, W 68–43	9 Virginia Tech, W 63–46	4 Loyola Chicago, W 65–53	2 Georgia Tech, W 60–54	W1 St. John's, W 77–51	SE8 Villanova, L 66–64
St. John's	West	1	16 Southern, W 83–59	9 Arkansas, W 68–65	12 Kentucky, W 86–70	3 NC State, W 69–60	E1 Georgetown, L 77–59	
Boston College	Midwest	11	6 Texas Tech, L 55–53	3 Duke, W 74–73	2 Memphis State, L 59–57			
Syracuse	East	7	10 DePaul, L 70–65	2 Georgia Tech, L 70–53				
Pittsburgh	Midwest	12	5 Louisiana Tech, L 78–54					

=== National Invitation Tournament ===
No Big East teams received bids to the National Invitation Tournament.

== Awards and honors ==
=== Big East Conference ===
Co-Players of the Year:

- Patrick Ewing, Georgetown, C, Sr.
- Chris Mullin, St. John's, F, Sr.

Defensive Player of the Year:

- Patrick Ewing, Georgetown, C, Sr.

Freshman of the Year:

- Charles Smith, Pittsburgh, F

Coach of the Year:

- Lou Carnesecca, St. John's (17th season)

All-Big East First Team

- Patrick Ewing, Georgetown, C, Sr., 7 ft 0 in (213 cm), 240 lb (109 kg), Cambridge, Mass.
- Chris Mullin, St. John's, F, Sr., 6 ft 6 in (198 cm), 205 lb (93 kg), Brooklyn, N.Y.
- Pearl Washington, Syracuse, G, So., 6 ft 2 in (188 cm), 190 lb (86 kg), Brooklyn, N.Y.
- Rafael Addison, Syracuse, F, Jr., 6 ft 7 in (201 cm), 215 lb (98 kg), Jersey City, N.J.
- Ed Pinckney, Villanova, F, Sr., 6 ft 9 in (206 cm), 205 lb (93 kg), The Bronx, N.Y.

All-Big East Second Team:

- Michael Adams, Boston College, G, Sr., 5 ft 10 in (178 cm), 165 lb (75 kg), Hartford, Conn.
- Earl Kelley, Connecticut, G, Jr., 6 ft 1 in (185 cm), 177 lb (80 kg), New Haven, Conn.
- Bill Martin, Georgetown, F, Sr., 6 ft 7 in (201 cm), 215 lb (98 kg), Washington, D.C.
- Bill Wennington, St. John's, C, Sr., 7 ft 0 in (213 cm), 245 lb (111 kg), Montreal, Quebec, Canada
- Walter Berry, St. John's, F, So., 6 ft 8 in (203 cm), 215 lb (98 kg), New York, N.Y.

All-Big East Third Team:

- David Wingate, Georgetown, G, Jr., 6 ft 5 in (196 cm), 185 lb (84 kg), Baltimore, Md.
- Michael Jackson, Georgetown, G, Jr., 6 ft 2 in (188 cm), 183 lb (83 kg), Fairfax, Va.
- Charles Smith, Pittsburgh, F, Fr., 6 ft 10 in (208 cm), 250 lb (113 kg), Bridgeport, Conn.
- Andre McCloud, Seton Hall, F, So., 6 ft 6 in (198 cm), 210 lb (95 kg), Washington, D.C.
- Mike Moses, St. John's, G, Sr., 5 ft 11 in (180 cm), 160 lb (73 kg), New York, N.Y.
- Dwayne McClain, Villanova, G, Sr., 6 ft 6 in (198 cm), 185 lb (84 kg), Worcester, Mass.

Big East All-Freshman Team:

- Skip Barry, Boston College, F, 6 ft 7 in (201 cm), 210 lb (95 kg), Nashua, N.H.
- Charles Smith, Pittsburgh, F, 6 ft 10 in (208 cm), 250 lb (113 kg), Bridgeport, Conn.
- Mark Bryant, Seton Hall, F, 6 ft 9 in (206 cm), 245 lb (111 kg), Glen Ridge, N.J.
- Michael Brown, Syracuse, G, 6 ft 4 in (193 cm), 205 lb (93 kg), Baltimore, Md.
- Rony Seikaly, Syracuse, G, 6 ft 10 in (208 cm), 240 lb (109 kg), Athens, Greece

=== All-Americans ===
The following players were selected to the 1985 Associated Press All-America teams.

Consensus All-America First Team:

- Patrick Ewing, Georgetown, Key Stats: 14.6 ppg, 9.2 rpg, 3.6 bpg, 62.5 FG%, 542 points
- Chris Mullin, St. John's, Key Stats: 19.8 ppg, 4.8 rpg, 4.3 apg, 52.1 FG%, 694 points

Consensus All-America Second Team:

- Pearl Washington, Syracuse, Key Stats: 15.4 ppg, 2.9 rpg, 6.1 apg, 49.9 FG%, 476 points

First Team All-America:

- Patrick Ewing, Georgetown, Key Stats: 14.6 ppg, 9.2 rpg, 3.6 bpg, 62.5 FG%, 542 points
- Chris Mullin, St. John's, Key Stats: 19.8 ppg, 4.8 rpg, 4.3 apg, 52.1 FG%, 694 points

Third Team All-America:

- Pearl Washington, Syracuse, Key Stats: 15.4 ppg, 2.9 rpg, 6.1 apg, 49.9 FG%, 476 points

AP Honorable Mention

- Michael Adams, Boston College
- Rafael Addison, Syracuse
- Walter Berry, St. John's
- Bill Martin, Georgetown
- Ed Pinckney, Villanova

== See also ==
- 1984–85 NCAA Division I men's basketball season
- 1984–85 Boston College Eagles men's basketball team
- 1984–85 Connecticut Huskies men's basketball team
- 1984–85 Georgetown Hoyas men's basketball team
- 1984–85 Pittsburgh Panthers men's basketball team
- 1984–85 St. John's Redmen basketball team
- 1984–85 Syracuse Orangemen basketball team
- 1984–85 Villanova Wildcats men's basketball team
