= Georgetown–St. John's men's basketball rivalry =

American college basketball rivalry

- Georgetown Hoyas St. John's Red Storm
- Sport: Basketball
- First meeting: December 8, 1909; St. John's 41, Georgetown 26
- Latest meeting: March 3, 2026; St. John's 72, Georgetown 69
- Next meeting: January 6, 2027
- Trophy: none

Statistics
- Total meetings: 128
- All-time series: St. John's leads, 71–57
- Largest victory: St. John's 107-67 (December 7, 1971)
- Longest win streak: St. John's, 11 (2020–present)

Locations of Georgetown and St. John's

The Georgetown–St. John's men's basketball rivalry is a college basketball rivalry between the Georgetown Hoyas men's basketball team of Georgetown University and St. John's Red Storm men's basketball team of St. John's University. The first meeting between the two schools was on December 8, 1909, which St. John's won 41–26. The two teams played off and on after that until 1965, when they began annually scheduled games, and the rivalry intensified when both programs became founding members of the original Big East Conference in 1979.

The rivalry was brought to national attention during the 1984–85 NCAA Division I men's basketball season when both programs were ranked #1 and #2 throughout the season and met on four occasions, including during the 1985 Big East Tournament championship game and the 1985 NCAA Tournament Final Four. In the schools' first meeting of the 1984–85 Big East season on January 26, 1985, at a sold-out Capital Centre, No. 2 St. John's upset the No. 1 Hoyas, breaking a 29-game Georgetown winning streak with St. John's coach Lou Carnesecca wearing an old sweater to keep warm while suffering from a common cold. It became his "lucky sweater," and he wore it at every game that followed as what were then known as the Redmen won another ten games in a row. With their rivalry at its peak, the two teams then met at a sold-out Madison Square Garden on February 27, 1985, with St. John's ranked No. 1 and the Hoyas No. 2. When Carnesecca — wearing his sweater — and Georgetown coach John Thompson, Jr., met courtside for a pregame handshake, Thompson opened his coat to reveal that he was wearing a replica T-shirt of Carnesecca's sweater, drawing a roar of laughter from the crowd. Georgetown went on to end the Redmen's winning streak with an 85–69 victory in a nationally televised game that went down in the history of both schools as "The Sweater Game."

The teams met in the championship game of the 2003 National Invitation Tournament and St. John's defeated Georgetown to win that year's NIT. St. John's later vacated the win and its championship due its use of an ineligible player.

The rivalry continued as both schools moved to the new Big East Conference in 2013 during the 2010–2014 NCAA conference realignment. Renewed interest in the rivalry arose when the programs were coached by their respective Hall of Fame players from the 1984–85 season, Chris Mullin and Patrick Ewing. Their tenures overlapped: Mullin coached St. John's from 2015 to 2019, and Ewing coached Georgetown from 2017 to 2023.

== Game results ==
Georgetown victories	St. John's victories	Tie games

No.	Date	Location	Winner	Score	Notes
1	December 8, 1909	St. John's Gym, Queens, NY	St. John's	41–26	
2	December 8, 1910	St. John's Gym, Queens, NY	St. John's	66–35	
3	January 15, 1912	Arcade Rink, Washington, DC	St. John's	34–17	
4	January 20, 1913	Arcade Rink, Washington, DC	Georgetown	29–16	
5	December 20, 1913	St. John's Gym, Queens, NY	St. John's	26–24	
6	December 22, 1915	St. John's Gym, Queens, NY	St. John's	26–16	
7	January 26, 1917	Ryan Gymnasium, Washington, DC	Georgetown	44–26	
8	February 1, 1917	St. John's Gym, Queens, NY	St. John's	38–24	
9	February 20, 1920	Ryan Gymnasium, Washington, DC	Georgetown	41–33	
10	February 25, 1920	St. John's Gym, Queens, NY	Georgetown	50–23	
11	February 11, 1921	Ryan Gymnasium, Washington, DC	Georgetown	51–15	
12	December 30, 1930	106th Regiment Armory, New York, NY	St. John's	26–19	
13	January 15, 1932	Tech Gymnasium, Washington, DC	St. John's	27–26	
14	January 20, 1933	Tech Gymnasium, Washington, DC	St. John's	31–24	
15	February 9, 1934	Tech Gymnasium, Washington, DC	St. John's	42–39	
16	January 9, 1936	DeGray Gymnasium, Queens, NY	St. John's	41–27	
17	February 22, 1943	Madison Square Garden, New York, NY	St. John's	65–43	At Madison Square Garden of 1925–1968
18	December 13, 1947	Madison Square Garden, New York, NY	Georgetown	61–58	At Madison Square Garden of 1925–1968
19	February 5, 1949	D.C. Armory, Washington, DC	St. John's	63–54	
20	January 13, 1950	69th Regiment Armory, New York, NY	St. John's	67–66	
21	December 4, 1965	McDonough Gymnasium, Washington, DC	St. John's	64–62	
22	December 3, 1966	Alumni Hall, Queens, NY	St. John's	70–62	
23	January 10, 1968	McDonough Gymnasium, Washington, DC	St. John's	65–61	
24	December 14, 1968	Alumni Hall, Queens, NY	St. John's	74–61	
25	December 15, 1969	McDonough Gymnasium, Washington, DC	St. John's	71–64	
26	December 12, 1970	Alumni Hall, Queens, NY	St. John's	80–74	
27	December 7, 1971	McDonough Gymnasium, Washington, DC	St. John's	107–67	
28	December 9, 1972	Alumni Hall, Queens, NY	St. John's	108–69	
29	December 8, 1973	McDonough Gymnasium, Washington, DC	Georgetown	85–82	
30	January 4, 1975	Alumni Hall, Queens, NY	Georgetown	67–63	
31	February 4, 1976	McDonough Gymnasium, Washington, DC	Georgetown	74–73	
32	February 2, 1977	Alumni Hall, Queens, NY	St. John's	82–66	
33	January 7, 1978	McDonough Gymnasium, Washington, DC	Georgetown	72–61	
34	December 9, 1978	Alumni Hall, Queens, NY	Georgetown	77–71	Last non-conference meeting
35	January 19, 1980	McDonough Gymnasium, Washington, DC	St. John's	71–69	First meeting in original Big East Conference
36	February 29, 1980	Providence Civic Center, Providence, RI	Georgetown	76–66	1980 Big East Tournament
37	January 7, 1981	Alumni Hall, Queens, NY	St. John's	68–60	
38	February 7, 1981	McDonough Gymnasium, Washington, DC	Georgetown	75–68	
39	January 6, 1982	Madison Square Garden, New York, NY	Georgetown	72–42	
40	January 31, 1982	Capital Centre, Landover, MD	Georgetown	63–46	
41	March 5, 1982	Hartford Civic Center, Hartford, CT	Georgetown	57–42	1982 Big East Tournament
42	January 8, 1983	Madison Square Garden, New York, NY	St. John's	76–67	
43	February 9, 1983	Capital Centre, Landover, MD	St. John's	75–69	
44	January 21, 1984	Madison Square Garden, New York, NY	Georgetown	83–61	
45	February 21, 1984	Capital Centre, Landover, MD	St. John's	75–71	
46	March 9, 1984	Madison Square Garden, New York, NY	Georgetown	79–68	1984 Big East Tournament
47	January 26, 1985	Capital Centre, Landover, MD	St. John's	66–65	
48	February 27, 1985	Madison Square Garden, New York, NY	Georgetown	85–69	"The Sweater Game"
49	March 9, 1985	Madison Square Garden, New York, NY	Georgetown	92–80	1985 Big East Tournament
50	March 30, 1985	Rupp Arena, Lexington, KY	Georgetown	77–59	1985 NCAA National Semifinal
51	January 11, 1986	Madison Square Garden, New York, NY	St. John's	79–74	
52	February 10, 1986	Capital Centre, Landover, MD	St. John's	60–58	
53	January 7, 1987	Capital Centre, Landover, MD	Georgetown	60–46	
54	February 2, 1987	Madison Square Garden, New York, NY	St. John's	67–65	
55	January 20, 1988	Capital Centre, Landover, MD	St. John's	65–58	
56	February 23, 1988	Madison Square Garden, New York, NY	St. John's	69–66	
57	January 23, 1989	Capital Centre, Landover, MD	Georgetown	75–64	
58	February 25, 1989	Madison Square Garden, New York, NY	Georgetown	63–55	
59	February 3, 1990	Madison Square Garden, New York, NY	Georgetown	74–67	
60	February 21, 1990	Capital Centre, Landover, MD	St. John's	63–62	
61	January 30, 1991	Capital Centre, Landover, MD	Georgetown	59–53	
62	February 25, 1991	Madison Square Garden, New York, NY	St. John's	68–58	
63	January 29, 1992	Capital Centre, Landover, MD	Georgetown	61–48	
64	March 2, 1992	Madison Square Garden, New York, NY	St. John's	65–49	
65	March 14, 1992	Madison Square Garden, New York, NY	Georgetown	68–64	1992 Big East tournament
66	February 1, 1993	Madison Square Garden, New York, NY	St. John's	79–61	
67	February 23, 1993	Capital Centre, Landover, MD	St. John's	61–56	
68	January 12, 1994	USAir Arena, Landover, MD	Georgetown	60–49	
69	February 19, 1994	Madison Square Garden, New York, NY	Georgetown	74–61	
70	January 24, 1995	USAir Arena, Landover, MD	Georgetown	88–71	
71	March 5, 1995	Madison Square Garden, New York, NY	St. John's	86–77	
72	January 27, 1996	Madison Square Garden, New York, NY	St. John's	83–72	
73	January 21, 1997	USAir Arena, Landover, MD	Georgetown	62–57	
74	February 1, 1997	Madison Square Garden, New York, NY	Georgetown	71–68	
75	January 10, 1998	MCI Center, Washington, DC	St. John's	64–60	
76	January 11, 1999	Madison Square Garden, New York, NY	St. John's	71–69	
77	February 20, 1999	MCI Center, Washington, DC	St. John's	74–66	
78	January 10, 2000	Madison Square Garden, New York, NY	St. John's	75–66	
79	February 21, 2001	Madison Square Garden, New York, NY	St. John's	73–70	
80	January 18, 2003	MCI Center, Washington, DC	St. John's	77–72	
81	April 3, 2003	Madison Square Garden, New York, NY	St. John's	70–67	2003 National Invitation Tournament final; St. John's later vacated the win
82	January 20, 2004	MCI Center, Washington, DC	Georgetown	71–69	
83	February 18, 2004	Madison Square Garden, New York, NY	St. John's	65–58	
84	January 25, 2005	MCI Center, Washington, DC	Georgetown	66–57	
85	February 20, 2005	Madison Square Garden, New York, NY	St. John's	76–67	
86	January 8, 2006	Madison Square Garden, New York, NY	Georgetown	79–65	
87	February 9, 2006	Verizon Center, Washington, DC	Georgetown	64–41	
88	February 1, 2007	Madison Square Garden, New York, NY	Georgetown	72–48	
89	January 30, 2008	Madison Square Garden, New York, NY	Georgetown	74–42	
90	February 27, 2008	Verizon Center, Washington, DC	Georgetown	64–52	
91	March 3, 2009	Madison Square Garden, New York, NY	St. John's	59–56	
92	March 10, 2009	Madison Square Garden, New York, NY	St. John's	64–59	2009 Big East tournament
93	December 31, 2009	Verizon Center, Washington, DC	Georgetown	66–59	
94	January 3, 2011	Madison Square Garden, New York, NY	St. John's	61–58	
95	January 26, 2011	Verizon Center, Washington, DC	Georgetown	77–52	
96	January 15, 2012	Madison Square Garden, New York, NY	Georgetown	69–49	
97	February 12, 2012	Verizon Center, Washington, DC	Georgetown	71–61	
98	January 12, 2013	Madison Square Garden, New York, NY	Georgetown	67–51	
99	February 2, 2013	Verizon Center, Washington, DC	Georgetown	68–56	Last meeting in original Big East Conference
100	January 4, 2014	Verizon Center, Washington, DC	Georgetown	77–60	First meeting in new Big East Conference
101	February 16, 2014	Madison Square Garden, New York, NY	St. John's	82–60	
102	February 17, 2015	Verizon Center, Washington, DC	Georgetown	79–57	
103	February 28, 2015	Madison Square Garden, New York, NY	St. John's	81–70	
104	January 13, 2016	Madison Square Garden, New York, NY	Georgetown	93–73	
105	February 8, 2016	Verizon Center, Washington, DC	Georgetown	92–67	
106	January 9, 2017	Verizon Center, Washington, DC	Georgetown	83–55	
107	February 25, 2017	Madison Square Garden, New York, NY	St. John's	86–80	
108	March 8, 2017	Madison Square Garden, New York, NY	St. John's	74–73	2017 Big East tournament
109	January 9, 2018	Madison Square Garden, New York, NY	Georgetown	69–66	
110	January 20, 2018	Capital One Arena, Washington, DC	Georgetown	93–89	
111	March 7, 2018	Madison Square Garden, New York, NY	St. John's	88–77	2018 Big East tournament
112	January 5, 2019	Capital One Arena, Washington, DC	St. John's	97–94	
113	January 27, 2019	Madison Square Garden, New York, NY	Georgetown	89–78	
114	January 8, 2020	Capital One Arena, Washington, DC	Georgetown	87–66	
115	February 2, 2020	Madison Square Garden, New York, NY	Georgetown	73–72	
116	March 11, 2020	Madison Square Garden, New York, NY	St. John's	75–62	2020 Big East tournament
117	December 13, 2020	McDonough Gymnasium, Washington, DC	Georgetown	97–94	
118	December 20, 2020	Carnesecca Arena, Queens, NY	St. John's	94–83	
119	January 16, 2022	Madison Square Garden, New York, NY	St. John's	88–69	
120	February 3, 2022	McDonough Gymnasium, Washington, DC	St. John's	90–77	
121	January 29, 2023	Madison Square Garden, New York, NY	St. John's	75–73	
122	February 22, 2023	Capital One Arena, Washington, DC	St. John's	79–70	
123	February 21, 2024	Capital One Arena, Washington, DC	St. John's	90–85	
124	March 9, 2024	Madison Square Garden, New York, NY	St. John's	86–78	
125	January 14, 2025	Madison Square Garden, New York, NY	St. John's	63–58	
126	January 28, 2025	Capital One Arena, Washington, DC	St. John's	66–41	
127	December 31, 2025	Capital One Arena, Washington, DC	St. John's	95–83	
128	March 3, 2026	Madison Square Garden, New York, NY	St. John's	72–69	
Series: St. John's leads 71–57
