= Harold Jensen =

American former basketball player

Personal information
- Born: c. 1965 (age 60–61) Trumbull, Connecticut, U.S.
- Listed height: 6 ft 4 in (1.93 m)
- Listed weight: 200 lb (91 kg)

Career information
- High school: Trumbull (Trumbull, Connecticut)
- College: Villanova (1983–1987)
- NBA draft: 1987: 6th round, 121st overall pick
- Drafted by: Cleveland Cavaliers
- Playing career: 1987–1988
- Position: Shooting guard
- Number: 32

Career history
- 1987–1988: Philadelphia Aces

Career highlights
- NCAA champion (1985); Second-team All-Big East (1987); 2× First-team Academic All-America (1986, 1987); Fourth-team Parade All-American (1983)
- Stats at Basketball Reference

Harold Jensen (born c. 1965) is an American former basketball player. He is best remembered as a key player in Villanova University's surprise 1985 NCAA championship victory. He shot the winning basket in the final minutes of the 1985 showdown against Georgetown.

Jensen was a 6'4" swingman from Trumbull High School in Trumbull, Connecticut. He played for coach Rollie Massimino at Villanova from 1983 to 1987. Jensen played little as a freshman, but as a sophomore was the sixth man for the Wildcats' 1985 National Championship team. For the season, Jensen averaged 4.1 points per game, but he came off the bench in the 1985 NCAA title game to shoot a perfect 5–5 from the floor and hit four clutch free throws in the closing minutes as Villanova beat the defending champion Georgetown Hoyas 66–64 in what is considered by many to be one of the biggest upsets in sports history. Jensen was named to the All-tournament team for his performance and would be remembered as one of the surprising heroes of NCAA tournament history.

Jensen built off his surprise sophomore tournament performance to become a starter for his junior and senior seasons. He led the Wildcats in scoring as a senior (15.9 points per game) and netted second team All-Big East honors. Jensen also received national recognition as a two-time first team Academic All-American – the first basketball player in Big East and Villanova history to be so honored. For his career, Harold Jensen scored 1,155 points and dished 231 assists.

After graduating from Villanova, Jensen was drafted in the 1987 NBA draft by the Cleveland Cavaliers (sixth round, 121st pick) but did not play in the NBA. He played one season in the United States Basketball League (USBL). He then entered a career in business as a marketing executive. Jensen is happily married with a son and daughter.

Jensen was elected to the Philadelphia Big 5 basketball hall of fame in 1995.
