= 1985 NCAA Division I men's basketball tournament =

Edition of USA college basketball tournament

- Season: 1984–85
- Teams: 64
- Finals site: Rupp Arena, Lexington, Kentucky
- Champions: Villanova Wildcats (1st title, 1st title game, 2nd Final Four)
- Runner-up: Georgetown Hoyas (4th title game, 5th Final Four)
- Semifinalists: Memphis State Tigers (Vacated) (2nd Final Four); St. John's Redmen (2nd Final Four)
- Winning coach: Rollie Massimino (1st title)
- MOP: Ed Pinckney (Villanova)
- Attendance: 422,519
- Top scorer: Chris Mullin (St. John's) (110 points)

The 1985 NCAA Division I men's basketball tournament involved 64 schools playing in single-elimination play to determine the national champion of men's NCAA Division I college basketball. This was the first year the field was expanded to 64 teams, from 53 in the previous year's tournament. The 47th annual edition of the tournament began on March 14, 1985, and ended with the championship game on April 1, at Rupp Arena in Lexington. A total of 63 games were played.

Eighth-seed Villanova, coached by Rollie Massimino, won their first national title with a 66–64 victory in the final game over Georgetown, coached by John Thompson. Ed Pinckney of Villanova was named the tournament's Most Outstanding Player. The game, often cited as "The Perfect Game", is widely considered among the greatest upsets in college basketball history, and is the second biggest point-spread upset in Championship Game history. This Villanova team remains the lowest-seeded team to win the tournament. The Wildcats are also notable as the most recent Division I men's national champion to represent a school that did not sponsor varsity football at the time of its title (Villanova had dropped football after the 1980 season and did not reinstate the sport until the 1985 season, the first after the championship game). The game is also notable as the last played without a shot clock.

This year's Final Four saw an unprecedented and unmatched three teams from the same conference, with Big East members Villanova and Georgetown joined by St. John's. The only "interloper" in the Big East party was Memphis State, then of the Metro Conference (Memphis State's 1985 Final Four appearance was vacated due to using ineligible players, as were all of its tournament appearances from 1982 to 1986). Lehigh, champion of the East Coast Conference Tournament, became the first team in NCAA Tournament history to compete with a record below .500, as they were 12–18 at the time they played in the First Round.

This was also the first year that one of the regionals was named "Southeast", replacing "Mideast". This name was used until 1998, when the regional was renamed "South". This was also the last tournament until 2010 to feature two private schools in the title game. This tournament was also the last until 2012 to feature no teams in the Sweet 16 from the Mountain or Pacific Time Zones. No metropolitan area as small as Lexington has hosted the Final Four to date, though Lexington has hosted regionals throughout the years.

== Schedule and venues ==
1985 first and second rounds
1985 Regionals (blue) and Final Four (red)

The following are the sites that were selected to host each round of the 1985 tournament:

First and Second Rounds

- March 14 and 16
  - East Region
    - Hartford Civic Center, Hartford, Connecticut (Host: University of Connecticut)
  - Midwest Region
    - Mabee Center, Tulsa, Oklahoma (Host: Oral Roberts University)
  - Southeast Region
    - Athletic & Convocation Center, South Bend, Indiana (Host: University of Notre Dame)
  - West Region
    - Special Events Center, Salt Lake City, Utah (Host: University of Utah)
- March 15 and 17
  - East Region
    - Omni Coliseum, Atlanta, Georgia (Host: Georgia Tech)
  - Midwest Region
    - Hofheinz Pavilion, Houston, Texas (Host: University of Houston)
  - Southeast Region
    - University of Dayton Arena, Dayton, Ohio (Host: University of Dayton)
  - West Region
    - University Arena ("The Pit"), Albuquerque, New Mexico (Host: University of New Mexico)

Regional semifinals and finals (Sweet Sixteen and Elite Eight)

- March 21 and 23
  - East Regional, Providence Civic Center, Providence, Rhode Island (Host: Providence College)
  - Midwest Regional, Reunion Arena, Dallas, Texas (Host: Southwest Conference)
- March 22 and 24
  - Southeast Regional, BJCC Coliseum, Birmingham, Alabama (Host: Southeastern Conference)
  - West Regional, McNichols Sports Arena, Denver, Colorado (Host: Big 8 Conference)

National semifinals and championship (Final Four and championship)

- March 30 and April 1
  - Rupp Arena, Lexington, Kentucky (Host: University of Kentucky)

== Teams ==
Region	Seed	Team	Coach	Conference	Finished	Final Opponent	Score
East
East	1	Georgetown	John Thompson	Big East	Runner-up	8 Villanova	L 66–64
East	2	Georgia Tech	Bobby Cremins	Atlantic Coast	Regional Runner-up	1 Georgetown	L 60–54
East	3	Illinois	Lou Henson	Big Ten	Sweet Sixteen	2 Georgia Tech	L 61–53
East	4	Loyola Chicago	Gene Sullivan	Midwestern City	Sweet Sixteen	1 Georgetown	L 65–53
East	5	SMU	Dave Bliss	Southwest	Round of 32	4 Loyola–Chicago	L 70–57
East	6	Georgia	Hugh Durham	Southeastern	Round of 32	3 Illinois	L 74–58
East	7	Syracuse	Jim Boeheim	Big East	Round of 32	2 Georgia Tech	L 70–53
East	8	Temple	John Chaney	Atlantic 10	Round of 32	1 Georgetown	L 63–46
East	9	Virginia Tech	Charles Moir	Metro	Round of 64	8 Temple	L 60–57
East	10	DePaul	Joey Meyer	Independent	Round of 64	7 Syracuse	L 70–65
East	11	Wichita State	Gene Smithson	Missouri Valley	Round of 64	6 Georgia	L 67–59
East	12	Old Dominion	Paul Webb	Sun Belt	Round of 64	5 SMU	L 85–68
East	13	Iona	Pat Kennedy	Metro Atlantic	Round of 64	4 Loyola–Chicago	L 59–58
East	14	Northeastern	Jim Calhoun	ECAC North	Round of 64	3 Illinois	L 76–57
East	15	Mercer	Bill Bibb	Trans America	Round of 64	2 Georgia Tech	L 65–58
East	16	Lehigh	Tom Schneider	East Coast	Round of 64	1 Georgetown	L 68–43
Midwest
Midwest	1	Oklahoma	Billy Tubbs	Big Eight	Regional Runner-up	2 Memphis State	L 63–61
Midwest	2	Memphis State	Dana Kirk	Metro	National semifinals	8 Villanova	L 52–45
Midwest	3	Duke	Mike Krzyzewski	Atlantic Coast	Round of 32	11 Boston College	L 74–73
Midwest	4	Ohio State	Eldon Miller	Big Ten	Round of 32	5 Louisiana Tech	L 79–67
Midwest	5	Louisiana Tech	Andy Russo	Southland	Sweet Sixteen	1 Oklahoma	L 86–84
Midwest	6	Texas Tech	Gerald Myers	Southwest	Round of 64	11 Boston College	L 55–53
Midwest	7	UAB	Gene Bartow	Sun Belt	Round of 32	2 Memphis State	L 67–66
Midwest	8	USC	Stan Morrison	Pacific-10	Round of 64	9 Illinois State	L 58–55
Midwest	9	Illinois State	Bob Donewald	Missouri Valley	Round of 32	1 Oklahoma	L 75–69
Midwest	10	Michigan State	Jud Heathcote	Big Ten	Round of 64	7 UAB	L 70–68
Midwest	11	Boston College	Gary Williams	Big East	Sweet Sixteen	2 Memphis State	L 59–57
Midwest	12	Pittsburgh	Roy Chipman	Big East	Round of 64	5 Louisiana Tech	L 78–54
Midwest	13	Iowa State	Johnny Orr	Big Eight	Round of 64	4 Ohio State	L 75–64
Midwest	14	Pepperdine	Jim Harrick	West Coast	Round of 64	3 Duke	L 75–62
Midwest	15	Penn	Craig Littlepage	Ivy League	Round of 64	2 Memphis State	L 67–55
Midwest	16	North Carolina A&T	Don Corbett	Mid-Eastern	Round of 64	1 Oklahoma	L 96–83
Southeast
Southeast	1	Michigan	Bill Frieder	Big Ten	Round of 32	8 Villanova	L 59–55
Southeast	2	North Carolina	Dean Smith	Atlantic Coast	Regional Runner-up	8 Villanova	L 56–44
Southeast	3	Kansas	Larry Brown	Big Eight	Round of 32	11 Auburn	L 66–64
Southeast	4	LSU	Dale Brown	Southeastern	Round of 64	13 Navy	L 78–55
Southeast	5	Maryland	Lefty Driesell	Atlantic Coast	Sweet Sixteen	8 Villanova	L 46–43
Southeast	6	Purdue	Gene Keady	Big Ten	Round of 64	11 Auburn	L 59–58
Southeast	7	Notre Dame	Digger Phelps	Independent	Round of 32	2 North Carolina	L 60–58
Southeast	8	Villanova	Rollie Massimino	Big East	Champion	1 Georgetown	W 66–64
Southeast	9	Dayton	Don Donoher	Independent	Round of 64	8 Villanova	L 51–49
Southeast	10	Oregon State	Ralph Miller	Pacific-10	Round of 64	7 Notre Dame	L 79–70
Southeast	11	Auburn	Sonny Smith	Southeastern	Sweet Sixteen	2 North Carolina	L 62–56
Southeast	12	Miami (OH)	Jerry Peirson	Mid-American	Round of 64	5 Maryland	L 69–68
Southeast	13	Navy	Paul Evans	ECAC South	Round of 32	5 Maryland	L 64–59
Southeast	14	Ohio	Danny Nee	Mid-American	Round of 64	3 Kansas	L 49–38
Southeast	15	Middle Tennessee State	Bruce Stewart	Ohio Valley	Round of 64	2 North Carolina	L 76–57
Southeast	16	Fairleigh Dickinson	Tom Green	ECAC Metro	Round of 64	1 Michigan	L 59–55
West
West	1	St. John's	Lou Carnesecca	Big East	National semifinals	1 Georgetown	L 77–59
West	2	VCU	J. D. Barnett	Sun Belt	Round of 32	7 Alabama	L 63–59
West	3	NC State	Jim Valvano	Atlantic Coast	Regional Runner-up	1 St. John's	L 69–60
West	4	UNLV	Jerry Tarkanian	Pacific Coast	Round of 32	12 Kentucky	L 64–61
West	5	Washington	Marv Harshman	Pacific-10	Round of 64	12 Kentucky	L 66–58
West	6	Tulsa	Nolan Richardson	Missouri Valley	Round of 64	11 UTEP	L 79–75
West	7	Alabama	Wimp Sanderson	Southeastern	Sweet Sixteen	3 NC State	L 61–55
West	8	Iowa	George Raveling	Big Ten	Round of 64	9 Arkansas	L 63–54
West	9	Arkansas	Eddie Sutton	Southwest	Round of 32	1 St. John's	L 68–65
West	10	Arizona	Lute Olson	Pacific-10	Round of 64	7 Alabama	L 50–41
West	11	UTEP	Don Haskins	Western Athletic	Round of 32	3 NC State	L 86–73
West	12	Kentucky	Joe B. Hall	Southeastern	Sweet Sixteen	1 St. John's	L 86–70
West	13	San Diego State	Smokey Gaines	Western Athletic	Round of 64	4 UNLV	L 85–80
West	14	Nevada	Sonny Allen	Big Sky	Round of 64	3 NC State	L 65–56
West	15	Marshall	Rick Huckabay	Southern	Round of 64	2 VCU	L 81–65
West	16	Southern	Robert Hopkins	Southwestern Athletic	Round of 64	1 St. John's	L 83–59

== Bracket ==
* – Denotes overtime period

=== East Regional – Providence, Rhode Island ===
First round
1	Georgetown	68
16	Lehigh	43
Hartford
8	Temple	60
9	Virginia Tech	57
5	SMU	85
12	Old Dominion	68
Hartford
4	Loyola–Chicago	59
13	Iona	58
6	Georgia	67
11	Wichita State	59
Atlanta
3	Illinois	76
14	Northeastern	57
7	Syracuse	70
10	DePaul	65
Atlanta
2	Georgia Tech	65
15	Mercer	58

Quarter-finals
1	Georgetown	63
8	Temple	46
5	SMU	57
4	Loyola Chicago	70
6	Georgia	58
3	Illinois	74
7	Syracuse	53
2	Georgia Tech	70

Regional semifinals
1	Georgetown	65
4	Loyola Chicago	53
3	Illinois	53
2	Georgia Tech	61

Regional Finals
1	Georgetown	60
2	Georgia Tech	54

==== Regional Final Summary ====
CBS

Saturday, March 23

box score

#1 Georgetown Hoyas 60, #2 Georgia Tech Yellow Jackets 54
Pts: P. Ewing – 14; Rebs: R. Dalton – 6 Asts: M. Jackson – 5	Pts: J. Salley – 15; Rebs: J. Salley – 5 Asts: S. Petway – 4 Halftime Score: 29–29

Providence Civic Center – Providence, Rhode Island

=== West Regional – Denver, Colorado ===
First round
1	St John's	83
16	Southern	59
Salt Lake City
8	Iowa	54
9	Arkansas	63
5	Washington	58
12	Kentucky	66
Salt Lake City
4	UNLV	85
13	San Diego State	80
6	Tulsa	75
11	UTEP	79
Albuquerque
3	NC State	65
14	Nevada	56
7	Alabama	50
10	Arizona	41
Albuquerque
2	VCU	81
15	Marshall	65

Quarter-finals
1	St John's	68
9	Arkansas	65
12	Kentucky	64
4	UNLV	61
11	UTEP	73
3	NC State	86
7	Alabama	63
2	VCU	59

Regional semifinals
1	St John's	86
12	Kentucky	70
3	NC State	61
7	Alabama	55

Regional Finals
1	St. John's	69
3	NC State	60

==== First round Summary ====
NCAA Productions
ESPN

Thursday, March 14
12:07 PM MST/2:07 PM EST

box score

#1 St. John's Redmen 83, #16 Southern Jaguars 59
Pts: W. Berry – 24; Rebs: W. Berry – 13; Asts: C. Mullin – 6	Halftime Score: St. John's, 34–18

Special Events Center – Salt Lake City, Utah
Attendance: 6,928

==== Second Round Summary ====
CBS

Saturday, March 16
2:30 PM MST/4:30 PM EST

box score

#1 St. John's Redmen 68, #9 Arkansas Razorbacks 65

Special Events Center – Salt Lake City, Utah
Attendance: 9,226

==== Regional semifinal Summary ====
CBS

Friday, March 22
8:09 PM MST/10:09 PM EST

box score

#1 St. John's Redmen 86, #12 Kentucky Wildcats 70
Pts: C. Mullin – 30; Rebs: W. Berry – 7 Asts: C. Mullin – 7	Pts: K. Walker – 23; Rebs: K. Walker – 8 Asts: R. Harden – 7 Halftime Score: St. John's, 39–38

McNichols Sports Arena – Denver, Colorado
Attendance: 17,022
Referees: John Clougherty, Bobby Dibler, Willis McJunkin

==== Regional Final Summary ====
CBS

Sunday, March 24
2:03 PM MST/4:03 PM EST

box score

#1 St. John's Redmen 69, #3 NC State Wolfpack 60
Pts: C. Mullin – 25; Rebs: B. Wennington – 10; Asts: M. Moses, M. Jackson – 5	Pts: L. Charles – 15; Rebs: L. Charles, C. McQueen – 11; Asts: S. Webb – 9 Halftime Score: St. John's, 30–29

McNichols Sports Arena – Denver, Colorado
Attendance: 17,022
Referees: John Clougherty, Bobby Dibler, Willis McJunkin

=== Southeast Regional – Birmingham, Alabama ===
First round
1	Michigan	59
16	Fairleigh Dickinson	55
Dayton
8	Villanova	51
9	Dayton	49
5	Maryland	69*
12	Miami (OH)	68
Dayton
4	LSU	55
13	Navy	78
6	Purdue	58
11	Auburn	59
South Bend
3	Kansas	49
14	Ohio	38
7	Notre Dame	79
10	Oregon State	70
South Bend
2	North Carolina	76
15	Middle Tennessee State	57

Quarter-finals
1	Michigan	55
8	Villanova	59
5	Maryland	64
13	Navy	59
11	Auburn	66
3	Kansas	64
7	Notre Dame	58
2	North Carolina	60

Regional semifinals
8	Villanova	46
5	Maryland	43
11	Auburn	56
2	North Carolina	62

Regional Finals
8	Villanova	56
2	North Carolina	44

==== Regional Final Summary ====
CBS

Sunday, March 24

box score

#8 Villanova Wildcats 56, #2 North Carolina Tar Heels 44
Pts: H. Pressley – 15; Rebs: E. Pinckney – 7 Asts: E. Pinckney, H. Jensen – 3	Pts: B. Daugherty – 17; Rebs: B. Daugherty – 12; Asts: J. Wolf, K. Smith – 5 Halftime Score: North Carolina, 22–17

BJCC Coliseum – Birmingham, Alabama

=== Midwest Regional – Dallas, Texas ===
First round
1	Oklahoma	96
16	North Carolina A&T	83
Tulsa
8	USC	55
9	Illinois State	58
5	Louisiana Tech	78
12	Pittsburgh	54
Tulsa
4	Ohio State	75
13	Iowa State	64
6	Texas Tech	53
11	Boston College	55
Houston
3	Duke	75
14	Pepperdine	62
7	UAB	70
10	Michigan State	68
Houston
2	Memphis State#	67
15	Penn	55

Quarter-finals
1	Oklahoma	75
9	Illinois State	69
5	Louisiana Tech	79
4	Ohio State	67
11	Boston College	74
3	Duke	73
7	UAB	66
2	Memphis State#	67*

Regional semifinals
1	Oklahoma	86*
5	Louisiana Tech	84
11	Boston College	57
2	Memphis State#	59

Regional Finals
1	Oklahoma	61
2	Memphis State#	63

* - denotes overtime

==== Regional Final Summary ====
CBS

Saturday, March 23

box score

#2 ~~Memphis State Tigers~~ 63, #1 Oklahoma Sooners 61
Pts: D. Kennedy – 16; Rebs: W. Tisdale – 12; Asts: T. McCalister, A. Bowie – 5	Pts: K. Lee – 23; Rebs: K. Lee – 11; Asts: A. Turner – 12; Halftime Score: 33–33

Reunion Arena – Dallas, Texas

=== Final Four – Lexington, Kentucky ===
National semifinals
W1	St John's	59
E1	Georgetown	77
SE8	Villanova	52
MW2	Memphis St. #	45

National Championship Game
E1	Georgetown	64
SE8	Villanova	66

# - Memphis State was forced to vacate its NCAA tournament appearance after a massive gambling scandal and a criminal investigation into head coach Dana Kirk. Unlike forfeiture, a vacated game does not result in the other school being credited with a win, only with Memphis removing the wins from its own record.

=== Game summaries ===
CBS

Saturday, March 30

box score

#8 Villanova Wildcats 52, #2 ~~Memphis State Tigers~~ 45
Pts: D. McClain – 19; Rebs: E. Pinckney – 9 Asts: M. Plansky, G. McLain, D. McClain – 2	Pts: A. Turner – 11; Rebs: Vincent Askew, W. Bedford, K. Lee – 7 Asts: V. Askew – 7 Halftime Score: 23–23

Rupp Arena – Lexington, Kentucky

CBS

Saturday, March, 30

box score

#1 Georgetown Hoyas 77, #1 St. John's Redmen 59
Pts: R. Williams – 20; Rebs: D. Wingate – 6 Asts: M. Jackson – 11	Pts: W. Glass – 13; Rebs: W. Berry – 6 Asts: M. Jackson – 5 Halftime Score: Georgetown, 32–28

Rupp Arena – Lexington, Kentucky

=== National Championship ===
CBS

Monday, April 1

Box score

#8 Villanova Wildcats 66, #1 Georgetown Hoyas 64
Pts: D. McClain – 17; Rebs: E. Pinckney – 6 Asts: E. Pinckney – 5	Pts: D. Wingate – 16; Rebs: B. Martin, P. Ewing – 5 Asts: M. Jackson – 9 Halftime Score: Villanova, 29–28

Rupp Arena – Lexington, Kentucky
Referees: John Clougherty, Bobby Dibler, Don Rutledge

== Announcers ==
=== Television ===
CBS Sports

- Brent Musburger First round (Kentucky–Washington), (Arizona–Alabama), second round & Dick Stockton Regional, Final Four served as studio hosts and Bill Raftery Regional, Final Four served as studio analyst.
- Dick Stockton/Brent Musburger and Billy Packer – Stockton/Packer, first round (Kentucky–Washington), second round at Salt Lake City, Utah & Houston, Texas; Musburger/Packer, East Regionals at Providence, Rhode Island, Southeast Regional Finals at Birmingham, Alabama, Final Four at Lexington, Kentucky
- Gary Bender and Doug Collins – Second Round at South Bend, Indiana & Dayton, Ohio, West Regionals at Denver, Colorado
- Frank Glieber and James Brown – Second Round at Hartford, Connecticut, Midwest Regionals at Dallas, Texas
- Pat Summerall/Verne Lundquist and Larry Conley – Summerall/Conley, second round at Atlanta, Georgia; Lundquist/Conley, Southeast Regional semifinals (Auburn–North Carolina) at Birmingham, Alabama
- Verne Lundquist and Steve Grote – First round (Arizona–Alabama) & Second Round at Albuquerque, New Mexico
- Tim Ryan and Bill Raftery – Second Round at Tulsa, Oklahoma

ESPN and NCAA Productions

- Bob Ley (NCAA Tournament Today/NCAA Tournament Tonight) served as studio host and Dick Vitale served as studio analyst.
- First round (Lehigh–Georgetown) & (Old Dominion–SMU) at Hartford, Connecticut
- First round (Virginia Tech–Temple) & (Iona–Loyola-Chicago) at Hartford, Connecticut
- Mike Patrick and Larry Conley – First round (Northeastern–Illinois) & (Mercer–Georgia Tech) at Atlanta, Georgia
- First round (Wichita State–Georgia) & (DePaul–Syracuse) at Atlanta, Georgia
- First round (Iowa State–Ohio State) & (Illinois State–Southern California) at Tulsa, Oklahoma
- First round (Pittsburgh–Louisiana Tech) & (North Carolina A&T–Oklahoma) at Tulsa, Oklahoma
- First round (Penn–Memphis State) & (Pepperdine–Duke) at Houston, Texas
- First round (Navy–Louisiana State) & (Dayton–Villanova) at Dayton, Ohio
- Frank Herzog/Ralph Hacker and Joe Dean– First round (Miami (OH)–Maryland) & (Fairleigh Dickinson–Michigan) at Dayton, Ohio
- First round (Ohio–Kansas) & (Oregon State–Notre Dame) at South Bend, Indiana
- Tom Hammond and Jack Givens – First round (Auburn–Purdue) & (Middle Tennessee–North Carolina) at South Bend, Indiana
- First round (Southern–St. John's) at Salt Lake City, Utah
- First round (Arkansas–Iowa) & (San Diego State–UNLV) at Salt Lake City, Utah
- Larry Zimmer and Ted Owens – First round (Nevada–NC State) at Albuquerque, New Mexico
- First round (UTEP–Tulsa) & (Marshall–VCU) at Albuquerque, New Mexico
- Frank Fallon and Gary Thompson- First round (Michigan State–UAB) & (Boston College–Texas Tech) at Houston, Texas, Midwest Regional semifinals (Louisiana Tech–Oklahoma) at Dallas, Texas
- Mike Patrick and Larry Conley – Southeast Regional semifinals (Villanova–Maryland) at Birmingham, Alabama

=== Radio ===
==== Regionals ====
CBS Radio

- – East Regionals at Providence, Rhode Island
- – Midwest Regionals at Dallas, Texas
- – Southeast Regionals at Birmingham, Alabama
- – West Regionals at Denver, Colorado

==== Final four ====
- – at Lexington, Kentucky

== See also ==
- 1985 NCAA Division II men's basketball tournament
- 1985 NCAA Division III men's basketball tournament
- 1985 NCAA Division I women's basketball tournament
- 1985 NCAA Division II women's basketball tournament
- 1985 NCAA Division III women's basketball tournament
- 1985 National Invitation Tournament
- 1985 National Women's Invitation Tournament
- 1985 NAIA men's basketball tournament
- 1985 NAIA women's basketball tournament
