= List of Big East Conference men's basketball regular season champions =

This is a list of Big East Conference men's basketball regular-season champions. There are no tie-breakers for the regular-season championship, so any teams tied for first at the end of the season share the championship.

From the 1995–96 season through the 1997–98 season, and again from the 2000-01 through the 2002–03 seasons, the Big East was divided into two divisions, each awarding regular-season championships to the teams with the best records in their respective divisions. From 1995–98 through 1997–98 the two divisions were named "Big East 6" and "Big East 7." From 2000-01 through 2002-03 the divisions were named "East" and "West."

The original Big East Conference began play in the 1979–80 season. After the end of the 2012–13 season, seven schools left that conference to join three other schools in forming a new Big East Conference which began play in the 2013–14 season, while the old conference renamed itself the American Athletic Conference, marketed as "The American." Both the new Big East and The American claim the history and heritage of the original Big East as their own. This list includes the champions of both the original Big East and the new Big East.

Big East Men's Basketball Regular Season Champions
Season	Champion*	Conference Record	Notes
1979-80	Georgetown ^{(1) (0)} St. John's ^{(1) (0)} Syracuse ^{(1) (0)}	5-1	
1980-81	Boston College ^{(1) (1)}	10-4	
1981-82	Villanova ^{(1) (1)}	11-3	
1982-83	Boston College ^{(2) (1)} St. John's ^{(2) (0)} Villanova ^{(2) (1)}	12-4	
1983-84	Georgetown ^{(2) (1)}	14-2	
1984-85	St. John's ^{(3) (1)}	15-1	
1985-86	St. John's ^{(4) (1)} Syracuse ^{(2) (0)}	14-2	
1986-87	Georgetown ^{(3) (1)} Pitt ^{(1) (0)} Syracuse ^{(3) (0)}	12-4	
1987-88	Pitt ^{(2) (1)}	12-4	
1988-89	Georgetown ^{(4) (2)}	13-3	
1989-90	Syracuse ^{(4) (0)} UConn ^{(1) (0)}	12-4	
1990-91	Syracuse ^{(5) (1)}	12-4	
1991-92	Georgetown ^{(5) (2)} Seton Hall ^{(1) (0)} St. John's ^{(5) (1)}	12-6	
1992-93	Seton Hall ^{(2) (1)}	14-4	
1993-94	UConn ^{(2) (1)}	16-2	
1994-95	UConn ^{(3) (2)}	16-2	
1995-96	Big East 6 Division UConn ^{(4) (2)} Big East 7 Division; Georgetown ^{(6) (2)}	13-5 (Big East 7 Division)	First season of play for the Big East 6 and Big East 7 divisions
1996-97	Big East 6 Division Boston College ^{(3) (1)} Villanova ^{(3) (1)} Big East 7 Division; Georgetown ^{(7) (2)}	12-6 (Big East 6 Division) 11-7 (Big East 7 Division)	
1997-98	Big East 6 Division UConn ^{(5) (2)} Big East 7 Division; Syracuse ^{(6) (1)}	12-6	Last season of play for the Big East 6 and Big East 7 divisions
1998-99	UConn ^{(6) (3)}	16-2	
1999-00	Miami ^{(1) (0)} Syracuse ^{(7) (1)}	13-3	
2000-01	East Boston College ^{(4) (1)} West; Notre Dame ^{(1) (0)}	13-3 (East) 11-5 (West)	First season of play for the East and West divisions
2001-02	East; UConn ^{(7) (3)} West; Pitt ^{(3) (1)}	13-3 (East); 13-3 (West)	
2002-03	East Boston College ^{(5) (1)} UConn ^{(8) (3)} West; Pitt ^{(4) (1)} Syracuse ^{(8) (1)}	10-6 (East) 13-3 (West)	Last season of play for the East and West divisions
2003-04	Pitt ^{(5) (2)}	13-3	
2004-05	Boston College ^{(6) (1)} UConn ^{(9) (3)}	13-3	
2005-06	UConn ^{(10) (3)} Villanova ^{(4) (1)}	14-2	
2006-07	Georgetown ^{(8) (3)}	13-3	
2007-08	Georgetown ^{(9) (4)}	15-3	
2008-09	Louisville ^{(1) (1)}	16-2	
2009-10	Syracuse ^{(9) (2)}	15-3	
2010-11	Pitt ^{(6) (3)}	15-3	
2011-12	Syracuse ^{(10) (3)}	17-1	
2012-13	Georgetown ^{(10) (4)} Louisville ^{(2) (1)} Marquette ^{(1) (0)}	14-4	Last season of play for the original Big East
2013-14	Villanova ^{(5) (2)}	16-2	First season of play for the new Big East
2014-15	Villanova ^{(6) (3)}	16-2	
2015-16	Villanova ^{(7) (4)}	16-2	
2016-17	Villanova ^{(8) (5)}	15-3	
2017-18	Xavier ^{(1) (1)}	15-3	
2018-19	Villanova ^{(9) (6)}	13-5	
2019-20	Creighton ^{(1) (0)} Seton Hall ^{(3) (1)} Villanova ^{(10) (6)}	13-5	
2020-21	Villanova ^{(11) (7)}	11-4	
2021-22	Providence ^{(1) (1)}	14-3	
2022-23	Marquette ^{(2) (1)}	17-3	
2023-24	UConn ^{(11) (4)}	18-2	
2024-25	St. John's ^{(6) (2)}	18-2	
2025-26	St. John's ^{(7) (3)}	18-2	

* The numbers in parentheses represent the number of overall championships won by that school up until the point (shared and outright), and outright championships won up to that point, respectively.
