= 1985 Big East men's basketball tournament =

- Classification: Division I
- Season: 1984–85
- Teams: 9
- Site: Madison Square Garden; New York City
- Champions: Georgetown (4th title)
- Winning coach: John Thompson (4th title)
- MVP: Patrick Ewing (Georgetown)
- Television: TCS/Metrosports, ESPN

1984–85 Big East men's basketball standings
	Conf.				Overall
Team	W		L	PCT	W		L	PCT
No. 3 St. John's	15	–	1	.938	31	–	4	.886
No. 1 Georgetown†	14	–	2	.875	35	–	3	.921
No. 15 Syracuse	9	–	7	.563	22	–	9	.710
Villanova	9	–	7	.563	25	–	10	.714
Pittsburgh	8	–	8	.500	17	–	12	.586
Boston College	7	–	9	.438	20	–	11	.645
Connecticut	6	–	10	.375	13	–	15	.464
Providence	3	–	13	.188	11	–	20	.355
Seton Hall	1	–	15	.063	10	–	18	.357
† 1985 Big East tournament winner As of April 1, 1985; Rankings from AP Poll

The 1985 Big East men's basketball tournament took place at Madison Square Garden in New York City, from March 6 to March 9, 1985. Its winner received the Big East Conference's automatic bid to the 1985 NCAA tournament. It is a single-elimination tournament with four rounds. St. John's had the best regular season conference record and received the #1 seed.

Georgetown defeated St. John's in the championship game 92–80, to claim its second straight Big East tournament championship, and fourth overall.

== Bracket ==
First round March 6, 1985
8	Providence	77^{OT}
9	Seton Hall	75

Quarterfinals; March 7, 1985
1	2 St. John's	90
8	Providence	62
4	Villanova	69
5	Pittsburgh	61
2	1 Georgetown	93
7	Connecticut	62
3	13 Syracuse	70
6	Boston College	69

Semifinals; March 8, 1985
1	2 St. John's	89
4	Villanova	74
2	1 Georgetown	74
3	13 Syracuse	65

Championship Game; March 9, 1985
1	2 St. John's	80
2	1 Georgetown	92

=== Quarterfinals summary ===
TCS MetroSports

Thursday, March 7
7:00 PM EST

#1 St. John's Redmen 90, #8 Providence Friars 62
Pts: W. Berry – 23; Rebs: W. Berry – 12; Asts: C. Mullin – 9	Pts: – 10; Rebs: – 6 Asts: – 4 Halftime Score: St. John's, 45-25

Madison Square Garden – New York City, New York
Attendance: 19,591

=== Semifinals summary ===
TCS MetroSports

Friday, March 8
approx. 9:30 PM EST

#1 St. John's Redmen 89, #4 Villanova Wildcats 74
Pts: W. Berry – 22; Rebs: W. Berry – 11; Asts: C. Mullin – 11	Pts: – 27; Rebs: – 11; Asts: – 5 Halftime Score: St. John's, 35-29

Madison Square Garden – New York City, New York
Attendance: 19,591
Referees: Mickey Crowley, Pete Pavia, Dick Paparo

=== Championship game summary ===
ESPN
TCS MetroSports

Saturday, March 9
8:00 PM EST

#2 Georgetown Hoyas 92, #1 St. John's Redmen 80
Pts: – 19; Rebs: – 8 Asts: – 8	Pts: C. Mullin – 25; Rebs: W. Berry – 7 Asts: M. Moses – 7 Halftime Score: Georgetown, 47-40

Madison Square Garden – New York City, New York
Attendance: 19,591
Referees: Larry Lembo, Pete Pavia, Dick Paparo

== Awards ==
Most Valuable Player: Patrick Ewing, Georgetown

All Tournament Team

- Rafael Addison, Syracuse
- Patrick Ewing, Georgetown
- Michael Jackson, Georgetown
- Bill Martin, Georgetown
- Chris Mullin, St. John's
- Ed Pinckney, Villanova
