= 1984–85 Villanova Wildcats men's basketball team =

American college basketball season

1984–85 Villanova Wildcats men's basketball

NCAA tournament National Champions

National Championship Game, W 66–64 vs. Georgetown
- Conference: Big East Conference
- Record: 25–10 (9–7 Big East)
- Head coach: Rollie Massimino (12th season)
- Assistant coaches: Mitch Buonaguro; Marty Marbach; Steve Lappas
- Home arena: Villanova Field House

1984–85 Big East men's basketball standings
	Conf.				Overall
Team	W		L	PCT	W		L	PCT
No. 3 St. John's	15	–	1	.938	31	–	4	.886
No. 1 Georgetown†	14	–	2	.875	35	–	3	.921
No. 15 Syracuse	9	–	7	.563	22	–	9	.710
Villanova	9	–	7	.563	25	–	10	.714
Pittsburgh	8	–	8	.500	17	–	12	.586
Boston College	7	–	9	.438	20	–	11	.645
Connecticut	6	–	10	.375	13	–	15	.464
Providence	3	–	13	.188	11	–	20	.355
Seton Hall	1	–	15	.063	10	–	18	.357
† 1985 Big East tournament winner As of April 1, 1985; Rankings from AP Poll

The 1984–85 Villanova Wildcats men's basketball team represented Villanova University. The head coach was Rollie Massimino. The team played its home games at Villanova Field House in Villanova, Pennsylvania, and was a member of the Big East Conference. The team is famous for one of the biggest upsets in sports history – a 66–64 win over #1 Georgetown in the NCAA Tournament final on April 1, 1985. They remain the lowest-seeded team in history to win the NCAA Tournament.

== Roster ==
1984–85 Villanova Wildcats men's basketball team
Players
Coaches

Pos.	#	Name	Height	Weight	Year	Hometown
F	50	Connally Brown	6 ft 7 in (2.01 m)	205 lb (93 kg)	So	Orange, Texas
G	10	Veltra Dawson	6 ft 1 in (1.85 m)	175 lb (79 kg)	Fr	Highland Park, Illinois
C	41	Chuck Everson	7 ft 1 in (2.16 m)	255 lb (116 kg)	Jr	Brentwood, New York
G	20	Brian Harrington	6 ft 0 in (1.83 m)	165 lb (75 kg)	Sr	Pound Ridge, New York
G	32	Harold Jensen	6 ft 5 in (1.96 m)	195 lb (88 kg)	So	Trumbull, Connecticut
C	43	Wyatt Maker	6 ft 11 in (2.11 m)	245 lb (111 kg)	So	Salinas, California
G	13	Roland Massimino	5 ft 10 in (1.78 m)	165 lb (75 kg)	Jr	Villanova, Pennsylvania
G/F	33	Dwayne McClain	6 ft 6 in (1.98 m)	195 lb (88 kg)	Sr	Worcester, Massachusetts
G	22	Gary McLain	6 ft 0 in (1.83 m)	180 lb (82 kg)	Sr	Hempstead, New York
F/C	54	Ed Pinckney	6 ft 9 in (2.06 m)	205 lb (93 kg)	Sr	Bronx, New York
F	25	Steve Pinone	6 ft 4 in (1.93 m)	195 lb (88 kg)	Sr	Wethersfield, Connecticut
F	31	Mark Plansky	6 ft 7 in (2.01 m)	200 lb (91 kg)	Fr	Wakefield, Massachusetts
F	21	Harold Pressley	6 ft 7 in (2.01 m)	210 lb (95 kg)	Jr	Mystic, Connecticut
G	4	Dwight Wilbur	6 ft 2 in (1.88 m)	185 lb (84 kg)	Jr	Paterson, New Jersey

Head coach

- Rollie Massimino (Vermont)

Assistant coach(es)

- Mitch Buonaguro (Boston College)
- Marty Marbach (Saint Francis (PA))
- Steve Lappas (CCNY)
- Harry Booth (Saint Joseph's)

Legend

- (C) Team captain
- (S) Suspended
- (I) Ineligible
- (W) Walk-on
- Injured
- Current redshirt

== Schedule ==
Date time, TV	Rank^{#}	Opponent^{#}	Result	Record	Site city, state
Non-conference regular season
November 24*; 7:30 pm		at Vermont	W 80–56	1–0	Patrick Gym; Burlington, Vermont
November 28*; 8 pm		at Marist	W 56–51	2–0	McCann Field House; Poughkeepsie, New York
December 1*; 2:30 pm, PRISM		vs. Temple; Big 5	W 68–65	3–0	The Palestra; Philadelphia, Pennsylvania
December 7*; 9 pm		Monmouth	W 77–62	4–0	Villanova Field House; Villanova, Pennsylvania
December 15; 7 pm		at Penn; Big 5	W 80–67	5–0	The Palestra; Philadelphia, Pennsylvania
December 22*; 2:30 pm, PRISM		at La Salle; Big 5	W 80–63	6–0	The Spectrum; Philadelphia, Pennsylvania
December 28*; 9:30 pm		vs. BYU; Cotton State-Kiwanis Classic Semifinal	W 91–61	7-0	The Omni; Atlanta, Georgia
December 29*; 9:30 pm		vs. Georgia; Cotton State-Kiwanis Classic Championship	L 68–75	7–1	The Omni; Atlanta, Georgia
Big East Conference Regular Season
January 2; 8 pm, USA		No. 5 Syracuse	W 82–70	8–1 (1–0)	The Palestra; Philadelphia, Pennsylvania
January 5; 8 pm		Connecticut	W 70–59	9–1 (2–0)	Villanova Field House; Villanova, Pennsylvania
January 7; 8 pm, ESPN; TCS Metrosports		at No. 4 St. John's	L 71–76	9–2 (2–1)	Madison Square Garden; New York City, New York
January 12; 2:30 pm, NBC	No. 16	No. 1 Georgetown	L 50–52	9–3 (2–2)	The Spectrum; Philadelphia, Pennsylvania
January 15; 8 pm, ESPN	No. 18	Boston College	W 85–66	10–3 (3–2)	Villanova Field House; Villanova, Pennsylvania
January 19; 3 pm	No. 18	at Seton Hall	W 86–74	11–3 (4–2)	Meadowlands Arena; East Rutherford, New Jersey
Non-conference regular season
January 21*; 9:30 pm	No. 18	at Drexel; City 6	W 63–55	12–3	The Palestra; Philadelphia, Pennsylvania
Big East Conference Regular Season
January 23; 8 pm	No. 14	Providence	W 65–57	13–3 (5–2)	The Palestra; Philadelphia, Pennsylvania
Non-conference regular season
January 27*; 12:30 pm, NBC	No. 14	at Maryland	L 74–77	13–4	Cole Field House; College Park, Maryland
Big East Conference Regular Season
January 29; 7 pm, ESPN	No. 18	Pittsburgh	W 70–63	14–4 (6–2)	The Palestra; Philadelphia, Pennsylvania
February 1; 8 pm, ESPN	No. 18	at No. 9 Syracuse	L 79–92	14–5 (6–3)	Carrier Dome; Syracuse, New York
February 5; 8 pm	No. 19	at Connecticut	W 79–71	15–5 (7–3)	Hugh S. Greer Field House; Storrs, Connecticut
February 9; 2 pm, CBS	No. 19	No. 1 St. John's	L 68–70	15–6 (7–4)	The Spectrum; Philadelphia, Pennsylvania
February 11; 8 pm, ESPN	No. 19	at No. 2 Georgetown	L 50–57	15–7 (7–5)	Capital Centre; Landover, Maryland
February 16; 12 pm, TCS MetroSports	No. 16	at Boston College	L 61–62	15–8 (7–6)	Roberts Center; Chestnut Hill, Massachusetts
Non-conference regular season
February 19*; 9 pm		vs. St. Joseph's; Big 5	W 47–44	16–8	The Spectrum; Philadelphia, Pennsylvania
Big East Conference Regular Season
February 23; 8 pm		at Providence	W 88–82	17–8 (8–6)	Providence Civic Center; Providence, Rhode Island
February 27; 8 pm		Seton Hall	W 80–75	18–8 (9–6)	Villanova Field House; Villanova, Pennsylvania
March 2; 2 pm, CBS		at Pittsburgh	L 62–85	18–9 (9–7)	Fitzgerald Field House; Pittsburgh, Pennsylvania
Big East tournament
March 7*; 9:30 pm, TCS MetroSports	(4)	vs. (5) Pittsburgh; Big East tournament quarterfinal	W 69–61	19–9	Madison Square Garden; New York City, New York
March 8*; 9:30 pm, TCS MetroSports	(4)	vs. (1) No. 2 St. John's; Big East tournament semifinal	L 74–89	19–10	Madison Square Garden; New York City, New York
NCAA Tournament
March 15*; 9:37 pm, ESPN; NCAA Productions	(8 SE)	vs. (9 SE) Dayton; NCAA Southeast first round	W 51–49	20–10	University of Dayton Arena; Dayton, Ohio
March 17*; 12:20 pm, CBS	(8 SE)	vs. (1 SE) No. 2 Michigan; NCAA Southeast Second Round	W 59–55	21–10	University of Dayton Arena; Dayton, Ohio
March 22*; 8:07 pm, ESPN; NCAA Productions	(8 SE)	vs. (5 SE) Maryland; NCAA Southeast Regional semifinal	W 46–43	22–10	BJCC Coliseum; Birmingham, Alabama
March 24*; 1:58 pm, CBS	(8 SE)	vs. (2 SE) No. 7 North Carolina; NCAA Southeast Regional Final	W 56–44	23–10	BJCC Coliseum; Birmingham, Alabama
March 30*; 3:42 pm, CBS	(8 SE)	vs. (2 MW) No. 5 Memphis State; NCAA National semifinal	W 52–45	24–10	Rupp Arena; Lexington, Kentucky
April 1*; 9:12 pm, CBS	(8 SE)	vs. (1 E) No. 1 Georgetown; NCAA national championship	W 66–64	25–10	Rupp Arena; Lexington, Kentucky
*Non-conference game. ^{#}Rankings from AP Poll. (#) Tournament seedings in parentheses. SE=Southeast.

== Awards and honors ==
- Ed Pinckney, Final Four Most Outstanding Player
- Ed Pinckney, Philadelphia Big 5 Player of the Year
- Ed Pinckney, 1st Team All-Big East
- Ed Pinckney, Big East All-Tournament Team
- Dwayne McClain, 3rd Team All-Big East
- Dwayne McClain, All-Big 5
- Dwayne McClain, Final Four All-Tournament Team
- Gary McLain, Final Four All-Tournament Team
- Harold Jensen, Final Four All-Tournament Team

== Team players drafted into the NBA ==
Year	Round	Pick	Player	NBA club
1985	1	10	Ed Pinckney	Phoenix Suns
1985	2	27	Dwayne McClain	Indiana Pacers
1985	7	144	Gary McLain	New Jersey Nets
1986	1	17	Harold Pressley	Sacramento Kings
1986	6	130	Chuck Everson	Utah Jazz
1987	6	122	Harold Jensen	Cleveland Cavaliers

== Legacy ==
In 2013, author Frank Fitzpatrick released his book The Perfect Game: How Villanova’s Shocking 1985 Upset of Mighty Georgetown Changed the Landscape of College Hoops Forever focusing on the team's victorious season. The team is an inductee into the 2025 class of the Philadelphia Sports Hall of Fame.
