= Marty Marbach =

American basketball player and coach

Biographical details
- Born: January 20, 1953 (age 73)
- Education: St. Francis (PA)

Coaching career (HC unless noted)
- 1976–1978: Bellefontaine, Immaculate Heart Seminary
- 1978–1979: Westfield State (assistant)
- 1979–1987: Villanova (assistant)
- 1987–1992: Canisius

Head coaching record
- Overall: 49–94 (.343)

Martin J. Marbach (born January 20, 1953) is a former men's college basketball head coach. He was the head coach at Canisius.

Marbach attended Bishop Hannan High School, graduating in 1971. He graduated from Saint Francis College in 1975 with a degree in social studies. Marbach served as athletic director and basketball and soccer coach at Bellefontaine, Immaculate Heart Seminary from 1976 to 1978. During the 1978–79 season he was an assistant basketball coach at Westfield State while earning his master's degree in sports management from the University of Massachusetts. Marbach joined Rollie Massimino's staff at Villanova in 1979. He was an assistant coach for the 1984–85 team that won a national championship. Marbach served as the recruiting coordinator at Villanova from 1985 to 1987.

In May 1987, Marbach was named head coach of Canisius. He succeeded Nick Macarchuk, who left to take the job at Fordham. In his first season, the Golden Griffins finished 7–20, and junior forward Jeff Taggart suffered a fatal heart attack during a game against Niagara. After finishing the 1991–92 season with an 8–22 record, Marbach was fired in March 1992. He finished with a 49–94 record at Canisius.

Following his coaching career, Marbach became a sales executive at Ampro Sports, a sports apparel company in Upper Darby Township, Pennsylvania. He is married to Denise Corkery Marbach, the president of Gwynedd Mercy Academy High School, and they have two daughters, Elizabeth and Michele.

== Head coaching record ==
Record table
Season	Team	Overall	Conference	Standing	Postseason
Canisius (ECAC North) (1987–1988)
1987–88	Canisius	7–20	7–11	7th	
Canisius:		7–20 (.259)	7–11 (.389)		
Canisius (North Atlantic Conference) (1988–1989)
1988–89	Canisius	13–15	11–7	4th	
Canisius:		13–15 (.464)	11–7 (.611)		
Canisius (MAAC) (1989–1992)
1989–90	Canisius	11–18	5–11	4th	
1990–91	Canisius	10–19	3–13	9th	
1991–92	Canisius	8–22	3–13	9th	
Canisius:		29–59 (.330)	11–37 (.229)		
Total:		49–94 (.343)			
National champion Postseason invitational champion Conference regular season champion Conference regular season and conference tournament champion Division regular season champion Division regular season and conference tournament champion Conference tournament champion
