= 1984–85 Pittsburgh Panthers men's basketball team =

American college basketball season

1984–85 Pittsburgh Panthers men's basketball

NCAA tournament, First Round, L 54–78 vs. Louisiana Tech
- Conference: Big East Conference (1979–2013)
- Record: 17–12 (8–8 Big East)
- Head coach: Roy Chipman (5th season)
- Assistant coaches: Reggie Warford (5th season); Joe DeGregorio (2nd season); Jay Eck (2nd season)
- Home arena: Fitzgerald Field House (Capacity: 4,122)

1984–85 Big East men's basketball standings
| | Conf. | | | | Overall |
| Team | W | | L | PCT | W | | L | PCT |
|---|---|---|---|---|---|---|---|---|
| No. 3 St. John's | 15 | – | 1 | .938 | 31 | – | 4 | .886 |
| No. 1 Georgetown† | 14 | – | 2 | .875 | 35 | – | 3 | .921 |
| No. 15 Syracuse | 9 | – | 7 | .563 | 22 | – | 9 | .710 |
| Villanova | 9 | – | 7 | .563 | 25 | – | 10 | .714 |
| Pittsburgh | 8 | – | 8 | .500 | 17 | – | 12 | .586 |
| Boston College | 7 | – | 9 | .438 | 20 | – | 11 | .645 |
| Connecticut | 6 | – | 10 | .375 | 13 | – | 15 | .464 |
| Providence | 3 | – | 13 | .188 | 11 | – | 20 | .355 |
| Seton Hall | 1 | – | 15 | .063 | 10 | – | 18 | .357 |
† 1985 Big East tournament winner As of April 1, 1985; Rankings from AP Poll

The 1984–85 Pittsburgh Panthers men's basketball team represented the University of Pittsburgh in the 1984–85 NCAA Division I men's basketball season. Led by head coach Roy Chipman, the Panthers finished with a record of 17–12. They received an at-large bid to the 1985 NCAA Division I men's basketball tournament where they lost in the first round to Louisiana Tech.
