= 1984–85 Georgetown Hoyas men's basketball team =

American college basketball season

1984–85 Georgetown Hoyas men's basketball

NCAA tournament, Runner-up NCAA Division I regular season champions Big East tournament champions

National Championship Game, L 64-66 vs. Villanova
- Conference: Big East Conference

Ranking
- Coaches: No. 1
- AP: No. 1
- Record: 35–3 (14–2 Big East)
- Head coach: John Thompson (13th season)
- Assistant coaches: Craig Esherick (3rd season); Mike Riley (3rd season)
- Captain: Patrick Ewing
- Home arena: Capital Centre

1984–85 Big East men's basketball standings
	Conf.				Overall
Team	W		L	PCT	W		L	PCT
No. 3 St. John's	15	–	1	.938	31	–	4	.886
No. 1 Georgetown†	14	–	2	.875	35	–	3	.921
No. 15 Syracuse	9	–	7	.563	22	–	9	.710
Villanova	9	–	7	.563	25	–	10	.714
Pittsburgh	8	–	8	.500	17	–	12	.586
Boston College	7	–	9	.438	20	–	11	.645
Connecticut	6	–	10	.375	13	–	15	.464
Providence	3	–	13	.188	11	–	20	.355
Seton Hall	1	–	15	.063	10	–	18	.357
† 1985 Big East tournament winner As of April 1, 1985; Rankings from AP Poll

The 1984–85 Georgetown Hoyas men's basketball team represented Georgetown University in the 1984–85 NCAA Division I college basketball season. John Thompson, coached them in his 13th season as head coach. They played their home games at the Capital Centre in Landover, Maryland. They were members of the Big East Conference and finished the season with a record of 35–3, 14–2 in Big East play. They won the 1985 Big East men's basketball tournament and advanced to the final of the 1985 NCAA Division I men's basketball tournament, which they lost to Big East rival Villanova in what is widely regarded as one of the greatest upsets in college basketball history. They were ranked No. 1 in the season's final Associated Press Poll and Coaches' Poll.

== Season recap ==
Sophomore forward Michael Graham had angered Thompson with his inattention to final examinations at the end of the previous academic year, and Thompson left him off the team this year; he stayed out of basketball this season and waited for Thompson to return him to the team until the fall of 1985, when he transferred to the University of the District of Columbia to resume his basketball career. However, freshman guard Perry McDonald joined the team this season, and he was destined to become one of Georgetown's great players. Although he did not start this season, he played in all 38 games off the bench, averaging 4.1 points per game. Most of his minutes came early in the season, and he had a season-high 15 points against Tennessee State.

Sophomore forward Reggie Williams missed the first three games of the season with an injury and played off the bench in the fourth game, but he became a starter in the fifth game and remained one for the next 100 games of his collegiate career. During the season, he shot 50.6% from the field, led the team in scoring eight times, and averaged 11.9 points per game. Sophomore guard-forward David Wingate shot over 50% from the field during Big East play and scored the 1,000th point of his collegiate career halfway through the season. He averaged 12.4 points and 6.6 rebounds per game for the year. Junior guard Michael Jackson, meanwhile, averaged 7.3 points per game, but made his greatest contribution to the Hoyas' offense with 242 assists, far and away a new school record. During the six NCAA Tournament games Georgetown played this season, Jackson averaged nine assists per game.

After spending most of the previous season playing off the bench, senior forward Bill Martin returned to the starting lineup. He led the team in scoring in eight games, shot 54% from the field, and was second on the team in rebounding for the third straight year. Junior guard Horace Broadnax completed his third season in a valuable reserve role, averaging 5.2 points per game; by the end of the season he had scored in double figures 18 times in his three years at Georgetown and was averaging 5.3 points per game for his career.

Entering its game with No. 3 St. John's at the Capital Centre on January 26, 1985, No. 1 Georgetown had a 29-game winning streak that dated back to the previous season, when St. John's had defeated Georgetown at the Capital Centre on February 21, 1984. In the January 26, 1985, game, St. John's again beat Georgetown, with St. John's head coach Lou Carnesecca attired in an old sweater he had worn in five straight St. John's wins to combat the effects of a common cold, and his team was elevated to No. 1 in the next AP Poll. The New York City media dubbed it Carnesecca's lucky sweater, and Carnesecca wore it in every game after that as St. John's won another ten games in a row. When Georgetown and St. John's next met on February 26, 1985, in a game at Madison Square Garden nationally televised by ESPN, St. John's was ranked No. 1, Georgetown was ranked No. 2, and the rivalry between the two schools was at its peak. When Carnesecca – wearing his sweater – and Thompson met courtside for a pregame handshake, Thompson opened his coat to reveal that he was wearing a replica T-shirt of Carnesecca's sweater, drawing a roar of laughter from the crowd. Reggie Williams scored a season-high 25 points, and Georgetown went on to defeat St. John's in what went down in Georgetown and St. John's history as "The Sweater Game."

Other than the one-point loss to St. John's on January 26 and a two-point loss to Syracuse two days later, Georgetown won every game during the regular season, dominating many of its opponents. Senior center Patrick Ewing averaged fewer than 10 shots per game for the season but nonetheless scored in double figures in 12 of the 16 regular-season Big East games. He also averaged 14.6 points and 9.2 rebounds per game for the year.

The Hoyas won the 1985 Big East men's basketball tournament, their second straight Big East tournament championship and the fourth in Georgetown men's basketball history, defeating Connecticut in the quarterfinal, No. 13 Syracuse in the semifinal, and No. 2 St. John's in the final. Bill Martin averaged 17 points and seven rebounds per game during the tournament.

Ranked No. 1 in the country, the Hoyas were the No. 1 seed in the East Region of the 1985 NCAA Division I men's basketball tournament – the seventh of 14 consecutive Georgetown NCAA tournament appearances. They advanced to the Final Four for the third time in four years – defeating No. 14 Loyola of Chicago and No. 6 Georgia Tech along the way – and met St. John's in the national semifinal. Both teams had been ranked No. 1 or No. 2 for most of the season, and St. John's had a 4–4 record against the Hoyas over the preceding three years, a record unequaled by Georgetown's other opponents during the same period. St. John's' biggest scoring threat was senior guard Chris Mullin, who had averaged 25.8 points per game in his last eight games against Georgetown and had not scored fewer than 20 points in any of those games. Wingate held Mullin to 4-for-8 shooting from the field and eight points, Mullin's lowest scoring performance against the Hoyas since his freshman year. Reggie Williams scored 20 points in the game as Georgetown won to advance to the national championship game for the third time in four years.

Georgetown was the heavy favorite to defeat Big East rival Villanova and win a second-straight national championship. Exceeding expectations, Villanova had had a storybook tournament, advancing from a No. 8 seed in the Southeast Region and upsetting Michigan, Maryland, and North Carolina to reach the championship game. Wingate had a team-high 16 points in the game and Reggie Williams scored 10 but turned his ankle late in the first half, an injury which slowed him for the rest of the game. Overall Georgetown shot 29-for-53 (55%) from the field, which might have been good enough to win most games. Villanova, however, set an NCAA record that still stands for team shooting percentage from the field in a single game, shooting 22-for-28 (78.6%) from the field as well as 22-for-27 (81.5%) from the free-throw line; after halftime, the Wildcats shot 90% from the field, missing only one field goal attempt in the entire second half. The record-breaking performance earned Villanova a two-point victory, defeating the Hoyas 66–64 in what many observers regard as perhaps the biggest upset in American sports history.

Although denied a second-straight national championship, Georgetown was ranked No. 1 in the season's final Associated Press Poll and Coaches' Poll, Georgetown's only No. 1 ranking at the end of a season in either poll. The 1984–85 team's 35 wins was a new school record, breaking the previous record of 34 set by the national championship team of the previous year.

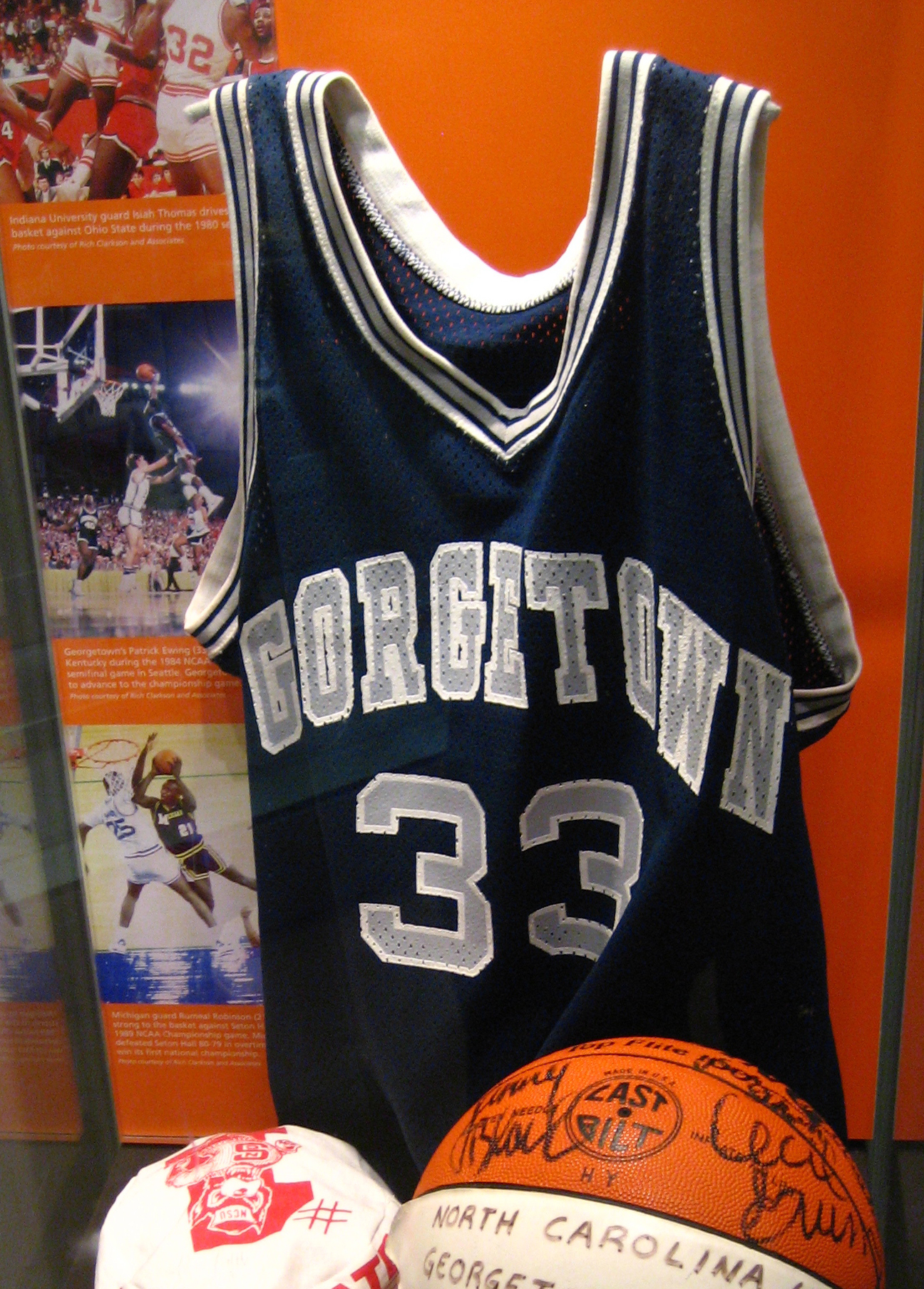
Patrick Ewing′s Georgetown jersey on display at the Naismith Memorial Basketball Hall of Fame in Springfield, Massachusetts, on February 18, 2008.

Ewing, who sportswriters and opposing fans had often accused of lacking the intellect to perform academically at Georgetown, graduated on time in May 1985. Generally considered the greatest player in Georgetown men's basketball history, he finished his four-year collegiate career with many school records, including highest career field goal percentage (.620), all-time leading rebounder (1,316), all-time leading shot blocker (493), second leading scorer (2,184), fifth in steals (167), and most games played in a career (143). During his four years with the team, the Hoyas had won one Big East regular season championship, won three Big East tournament titles, played in four NCAA tournaments, made three Final Four appearances, played in three national championship games, and won one national championship. During the nine years of John Thompson, Jr.'s tenure as head coach before Ewing's arrival, the Hoyas had won two NCAA tournament games; during Ewing's four years, they won 15. Georgetown had an overall record of 121–23 during the Ewing years, winning fewer than 30 games in a season only once and never winning fewer than 22. After a long career as a player and coach in the National Basketball Association, he would return to Georgetown as head coach from 2017 to 2023.

The 1984–85 season saw Georgetown's last Final Four appearance until the 2006–07 season. The Hoyas have not returned to the national championship game.

== Roster ==
Senior center Patrick Ewing returned to Georgetown as head coach from 2017 to 2023.

#	Name	Height	Weight (lbs.)	Position	Class	Hometown	Previous Team(s)
10	Perry MacDonald	6'4"	190	F/G	Fr.	New Orleans, LA, U.S.	George Washington Carver Senior HS
12	Kevin Floyd	6'2"	N/A	G	Fr.	Los Angeles, U.S.	Westchester HS
24	Bill Martin	6'7"	215	F	Sr.	Washington, DC, U.S.	McKinley Technology HS
30	Michael Jackson	6'2"	175	G	Jr.	Reston, VA, U.S.	South Lakes HS
32	Horace Broadnax	6'0"	190	G	Jr.	Plant City, FL, U.S.	Plant City HS
33	Patrick Ewing	7'0"	240	C	Sr.	Cambridge, MA, U.S.	Cambridge Rindge and Latin School
34	Reggie Williams	6'7"	190	F	So.	Baltimore, MD, U.S.	Paul Laurence Dunbar HS
40	David Wingate	6'5"	185	F	Jr.	Baltimore, MD, U.S.	Paul Laurence Dunbar HS
41	Tyrone Lockhart	5'10"	N/A	G	So.	Lexington, MA, U.S.	Lexington HS
44	Ronnie Highsmith	6'8"	N/A	F	Fr.	Robersonville, NC, U.S.	United States Army
51	Grady Mateen	6'11"	N/A	C	Fr.	Akron, OH, U.S.	Central-Hower HS
52	Ralph Dalton	6'9"	N/A	C	Sr.	Suitland, MD, U.S.	Fishburne Military School (Va.)

== Awards and honors ==
- John Thompson, NABC Coach of the Year
- Patrick Ewing, Adolph Rupp Trophy
- Patrick Ewing, Naismith College Player of the Year
- Patrick Ewing, AP Player of the Year
- Patrick Ewing, NABC Player of the Year
- Patrick Ewing, Sporting News Player of the Year
- Patrick Ewing, Consensus first team All-American
- Patrick Ewing, Big East Conference Co-Player of the Year
- Patrick Ewing, Big East Defensive Player of the Year
- Patrick Ewing, 1st Team, All-Big East
- Patrick Ewing, Big East tournament MVP
- Patrick Ewing, NCAA East Regional MVP
- Patrick Ewing, NCAA All-Tournament Team
- Bill Martin, 2nd Team, All-Big East
- Michael Jackson, 3rd Team, All-Big East
- Michael Jackson, Big East All-Tournament team
- David Wingate, 3rd Team, All-Big East
- David Wingate, NCAA All-East Regional

== Team players drafted into the NBA ==
Year	Round	Pick	Player	NBA club
1985	1	1	Patrick Ewing	New York Knicks
1985	2	26	Bill Martin	Indiana Pacers
1986	2	44	David Wingate	Philadelphia 76ers
1986	2	47	Michael Jackson	New York Knicks
1986	7	142	Ralph Dalton	Cleveland Cavaliers
1987	1	4	Reggie Williams	Los Angeles Clippers

== Rankings ==
Ranking movements Legend: ██ Increase in ranking ██ Decrease in ranking
	Week																
Poll	Pre	1	2	3	4	5	6	7	8	9	10	11	12	13	14	15	Final
AP	1	1	1	1	1	1	1	1	1	1	2	2	2	2	2	1	1
Coaches	(Note: No Coaches' Poll this week.)	1	1	1	1	1	1	1	1	1	2	2	2	2	2	1	1

== 1984–85 schedule and results ==
Sources

- All times are in the Eastern Time Zone.

Date time, TV	Rank^{#}	Opponent^{#}	Result	Record	Site (attendance) city, state
Regular Season
Fri., Nov. 23, 1984*	No. 1	at Hawaii-Hilo	W 81–47	1–0	Civic Auditorium (2,950); Hilo, HI
Mon., Nov. 26, 1984*	No. 1	at Hawaii Loa	W 74–45	2–0	Kailua Gymnasium (2,326); Kailua, HI
Sat., Dec. 1, 1984*	No. 1	Southern Connecticut State	W 80–46	3–0	Capital Centre (5,840); Landover, MD
Wed., Dec. 5, 1984*	No. 1	Saint Leo	W 76–56	4–0	Capital Centre (N/A); Landover, MD
Sat., Dec. 8, 1984*; CBS	No. 1	No. 20 UNLV	W 82–46	5–0	Capital Centre (N/A); Landover, MD
Wed., Dec. 12, 1984*	No. 1	American	W 86–64	6–0	Capital Centre (5,112); Landover, MD
Sat., Dec. 15, 1984*	No. 1	No. 2 DePaul	W 77–57	7–0	Capital Centre (N/A); Landover, MD
Wed., Dec. 19, 1984*	No. 1	Morgan State	W 89–62	8–0	Capital Centre (3,954); Landover, MD
Sat., Dec. 22, 1984*	No. 1	at New Mexico	W 69–61	9–0	University Arena (17,029); Albuquerque, NM
Fri., Dec. 28, 1984*	No. 1	vs. Tennessee State; Copa Navidad	W 77–64	10–0	Roberto Clemente Coliseum (5,029); San Juan, PR
Sat., Dec. 29, 1984*	No. 1	vs. North Carolina A&T; Copa Navidad	W 61–56	11–0	Roberto Clemente Coliseum (3,871); San Juan, PR
Wed., Jan. 2, 1985	No. 1	Seton Hall	W 83–56	12–0 (1–0)	Capital Centre (8,060); Landover, MD
Sat., Jan. 5, 1985	No. 1	Boston College	W 82–80 ^{OT}	13–0 (2–0)	Capital Centre (12,871); Landover, MD
Tue., Jan. 8, 1985	No. 1	at Seton Hall	W 90–71	14–0 (3–0)	Brendan Byrne Arena (12,171); East Rutherford, NJ
Sat., Jan. 12, 1985	No. 1	at No. 16 Villanova	W 52–50 ^{OT}	15–0 (4–0)	Spectrum (18,202); Philadelphia, PA
Wed., Jan. 16, 1985	No. 1	Providence	W 85–44	16–0 (5–0)	Capital Centre (10,634); Landover, MD
Sat., Jan 19, 1985	No. 1	at Pittsburgh	W 65–53	17–0 (6–0)	Civic Arena (16,532); Pittsburgh, PA
Wed., Jan. 23, 1985	No. 1	Connecticut; Rivalry	W 79–66	18–0 (7–0)	Capital Centre (9,325); Landover, MD
Sat., Jan. 26, 1985; CBS	No. 1	No. 2 St. John's	L 65–66	18–1 (7–1)	Capital Centre (19,035); Landover, MD
Mon., Jan 28, 1985	No. 1	at No. 9 Syracuse; Rivalry	L 63–65	18–2 (7–2)	Carrier Dome (32,229); Syracuse, NY
Sun., Feb. 3, 1985*	No. 2	Arkansas	W 56–39	19–2	Capital Centre (14,391); Landover, MD
Wed., Feb. 6, 1985*	No. 2	Florida Southern	W 71–39	20–2	Capital Centre (8,143); Landover, MD
Sat., Feb. 9, 1985	No. 2	at Boston College	W 78–68	21–2 (8–2)	Boston Garden (14,681); Boston, MA
Mon., Feb. 11, 1985	No. 2	No. 16 Villanova	W 57–50	22–2 (9–2)	Capital Centre (15,188); Landover, MD
Sat., Feb 16, 1985	No. 2	at Providence	W 87–73	23–2 (10–2)	Providence Civic Center (12,150); Providence, RI
Tue., Feb. 19, 1985	No. 2	Pittsburgh	W 70–46	24–2 (11–2)	Capital Centre (9,034); Landover, MD
Sat., Feb. 23, 1985	No. 2	at Connecticut; Rivalry	W 68–47	25–2 (12–2)	Hartford Civic Center (15,685); Hartford, CT
Wed., Feb. 27, 1985; ESPN	No. 2	at No. 1 St. John's	W 85–69	26–2 (13–2)	Madison Square Garden (19,591); New York, NY
Sun., Mar. 3, 1985	No. 2	No. 12 Syracuse; Rivalry	W 90–63	27–2 (14–2)	Capital Centre (19,335); Landover, MD
Big East tournament
Fri., Mar. 8, 1985	(2) No. 1	vs. (7) Connecticut; Quarterfinals/Rivalry	W 93–62	28–2	Madison Square Garden (19,591); New York, NY
Sat., Mar. 9, 1985	(2) No. 1	vs. (3) No. 13 Syracuse; Semifinal/Rivalry	W 74–65	29–2	Madison Square Garden (19,591); New York, NY
Sun., Mar. 10, 1985	(2) No. 1	vs. (1) No. 2 St. John's; Championship	W 92–82	30–2	Madison Square Garden (19,591); New York, NY
NCAA Tournament
Fri., Mar. 15, 1985	(1 E) No. 1	vs. (16 E) Lehigh; First Round	W 68–43	31–2	Hartford Civic Center (9,338); Hartford, CT
Sun., Mar. 17, 1985	(1 E) No. 1	vs. (8 E) Temple; Second Round	W 68–46	32–2	Hartford Civic Center (14,897); Hartford, CT
Thu., Mar. 21, 1985; CBS	(1 E) No. 1	vs. (4 E) No. 14 Loyola; Sweet Sixteen	W 65–53	33–2	Providence Civic Center (11,913); Providence, RI
Sat., Mar. 23, 1985; CBS	(1 E) No. 1	vs. (2 E) No. 6 Georgia Tech; Elite Eight	W 60–54	34–2	Providence Civic Center (11,913); Providence, RI
Sat., Mar. 30, 1985; CBS	(1 E) No. 1	vs. (1 W) No. 3 St. John's; Final Four	W 77–59	35–2	Rupp Arena (23,135); Lexington, KY
Mon., Apr. 1, 1985; CBS	(1 E) No. 1	vs. (8 SE) Villanova; Final	L 64–66	35–3	Rupp Arena (23,124); Lexington, KY
*Non-conference game. ^{#}Rankings from AP Poll. (#) Tournament seedings in parentheses.
