= 1984–85 Boston College Eagles men's basketball team =

American college basketball season

1984–85 Boston College Eagles men's basketball

NCAA tournament, Sweet Sixteen
- Conference: Big East Conference
- Record: 20–11 (7–9 Big East)
- Head coach: Gary Williams (3rd season)
- Assistant coaches: Paul Brazeau; Stan Nance; Frank Power
- Home arena: Roberts Center

1984–85 Big East men's basketball standings
	Conf.				Overall
Team	W		L	PCT	W		L	PCT
No. 3 St. John's	15	–	1	.938	31	–	4	.886
No. 1 Georgetown†	14	–	2	.875	35	–	3	.921
No. 15 Syracuse	9	–	7	.563	22	–	9	.710
Villanova	9	–	7	.563	25	–	10	.714
Pittsburgh	8	–	8	.500	17	–	12	.586
Boston College	7	–	9	.438	20	–	11	.645
Connecticut	6	–	10	.375	13	–	15	.464
Providence	3	–	13	.188	11	–	20	.355
Seton Hall	1	–	15	.063	10	–	18	.357
† 1985 Big East tournament winner As of April 1, 1985; Rankings from AP Poll

The 1984–85 Boston College Eagles men's basketball team represented Boston College as members of the Big East Conference during the 1984–85 NCAA Division I men's basketball season.

== Roster ==
1984–85 Boston College Eagles men's basketball team
Players
Coaches

Pos.	#	Name	Height	Weight	Year	Hometown
G	5	Charlie Micol	5 ft 8 in (1.73 m)	155 lb (70 kg)	So	Chelmsford, MA
G	10	Ted Kelley	6 ft 5 in (1.96 m)	190 lb (86 kg)	So	Andover, MA
G	11	Jamie Benton	6 ft 0 in (1.83 m)	180 lb (82 kg)	Fr	Providence, RI
F/C	20	Roger McCready	6 ft 5 in (1.96 m)	210 lb (95 kg)	Jr	Brooklyn, NY
G	21	Mark Schmidt	6 ft 2 in (1.88 m)	180 lb (82 kg)	Sr	North Attleboro, MA
F	22	Mike Sinicki	6 ft 6 in (1.98 m)	215 lb (98 kg)	Jr	Endwell, NY
G	23	Michael Adams	5 ft 11 in (1.8 m)	160 lb (73 kg)	Sr	Hartford, CT
G/F	24	Terrence Talley	6 ft 4 in (1.93 m)	190 lb (86 kg)	Sr	Bronx, NY
G	30	Stu Primus	6 ft 3 in (1.91 m)	195 lb (88 kg)	Sr	Lynn, MA
F	31	Russ Doherty	6 ft 8 in (2.03 m)	210 lb (95 kg)	So	Wayland, MA
G	32	Dominic Pressley	6 ft 3 in (1.91 m)	170 lb (77 kg)	Jr	Washington, D.C.
F	33	Skip Barry	6 ft 7 in (2.01 m)	210 lb (95 kg)	Fr	Nashua, NH
F	42	Tyrone Scott	6 ft 8 in (2.03 m)	215 lb (98 kg)	Fr	Waterloo, NY
F/C	50	Trevor Gordon	6 ft 9 in (2.06 m)	235 lb (107 kg)	Jr	Philadelphia, PA
F	55	Troy Bowers	6 ft 8 in (2.03 m)	210 lb (95 kg)	So	Roselle, NJ

Head coach

- Gary Williams (Maryland)

Assistant coach(es)

- Paul Brazeau
- Stan Nance
- Frank Power

Legend

- (C) Team captain
- (S) Suspended
- (I) Ineligible
- (W) Walk-on
- Injured
- Current redshirt

Roster

== Schedule and results ==
Date time, TV	Rank^{#}	Opponent^{#}	Result	Record	Site (attendance) city, state
Regular season
November 27, 1984*		at New Hampshire	W 86–63	1–0	Lundholm Gym; Durham, NH
December 2, 1984*		Wake Forest	W 82–76	2–0	Boston Garden; Boston, MA
December 5, 1984*		at Brown	W 90–70	3–0	Marvel Gymnasium; Providence, RI
December 8, 1984*		Stonehill	W 98–71	4–0	Roberts Center; Chestnut Hill, MA
December 11, 1984*		Rhode Island	W 70–50	5–0	Roberts Center; Chestnut Hill, MA
December 15, 1984*		at Holy Cross	W 85–63	6–0	Hart Center; Worcester, MA
December 22, 1984*		Randolph–Macon	W 87–43	7–0	Roberts Center; Chestnut Hill, MA
December 28, 1984*		vs. Michigan State; Cabrillo Classic semifinals	W 82–78	8–0	San Diego Sports Arena; San Diego, CA
December 29, 1984*		vs. TCU; Cabrillo Classic championship	W 92–75	9–0	San Diego Sports Arena; San Diego, CA
January 2, 1985		Providence	W 67–55	10–0 (1–0)	Roberts Center; Chestnut Hill, MA
January 5, 1985		at No. 1 Georgetown	L 80–82 ^{OT}	10–1 (1–1)	Capital Centre; Landover, MD
January 8, 1985	No. 12	at No. 7 Syracuse	L 58–64	10–2 (1–2)	Carrier Dome; Syracuse, NY
January 12, 1985	No. 12	Seton Hall	W 69–66	11–2 (2–2)	Roberts Center; Chestnut Hill, MA
January 15, 1985	No. 15	at No. 18 Villanova	L 66–85	11–3 (2–3)	Villanova Field House; Philadelphia, PA
January 19, 1985	No. 15	No. 4 St. John's	L 59–66	11–4 (2–4)	Boston Garden; Boston, MA
January 21, 1985		Pittsburgh	L 55–61	11–5 (2–5)	Roberts Center; Chestnut Hill, MA
January 26, 1985		at Connecticut	W 78–77 ^{OT}	12–5 (3–5)	Hartford Civic Center; Hartford, CT
January 28, 1985*		Hartford	W 94–77	13–5	Roberts Center; Chestnut Hill, MA
January 30, 1985*		at Northeastern	W 82–75	14–5	Matthews Arena; Boston, MA
February 2, 1985		at Providence	W 93–66	15–5 (4–5)	Providence Civic Center; Providence, RI
February 5, 1985		No. 6 Syracuse	W 67–66	16–5 (5–5)	Boston Garden; Boston, MA
February 9, 1985		No. 2 Georgetown	L 68–78	16–6 (5–6)	Boston Garden; Boston, MA
February 12, 1985		at Seton Hall	W 101–83	17–6 (6–6)	Brendan Byrne Arena; East Rutherford, NJ
February 16, 1985		No. 16 Villanova	W 62–61	18–6 (7–6)	Roberts Center; Chestnut Hill, MA
February 20, 1985	No. 20	at No. 1 St. John's	L 69–71	18–7 (7–7)	Alumni Hall; Queens, NY
February 23, 1985	No. 20	at Pittsburgh	L 55–58	18–8 (7–8)	Fitzgerald Field House; Pittsburgh, PA
February 25, 1985		Connecticut	L 68–74	18–9 (7–9)	Roberts Center; Boston, Massachusetts
Big East Tournament
March 7, 1985*	(6)	vs. (3) No. 13 Syracuse; Quarterfinals	L 69–70	18–10	Madison Square Garden; New York, NY
NCAA Tournament
March 15, 1985*	(11 MW)	vs. (6 MW) No. 17 Texas Tech; First round	W 55–53	19–10	Hofheinz Pavilion; Houston, Texas
March 17, 1985*	(11 MW)	vs. (3 MW) No. 10 Duke; Second Round	W 74–73	20–10	Hofheinz Pavilion; Houston, Texas
March 21, 1985*	(11 MW)	vs. (2 MW) No. 5 Memphis State; Sweet Sixteen	L 57–59	20–11	Reunion Arena; Dallas, Texas
*Non-conference game. ^{#}Rankings from AP Poll. (#) Tournament seedings in parentheses.
