= 1984–85 St. John's Redmen basketball team =

American college basketball season

1984–85 St. John's Redmen men's basketball

Big East tournament runner-up Big East regular-season champions Lapchick Memorial champions ECAC Holiday Festival champions

NCAA men's Division I tournament, Final Four
- Conference: Big East Conference

Ranking
- Coaches: No. 3
- AP: No. 3
- Record: 31–4 (15–1 Big East)
- Head coach: Lou Carnesecca
- Assistant coaches: Brian Mahoney; Al LoBalbo; Ron Rutledge
- Home arena: Alumni Hall; Madison Square Garden

1984–85 Big East men's basketball standings
	Conf.				Overall
Team	W		L	PCT	W		L	PCT
No. 3 St. John's	15	–	1	.938	31	–	4	.886
No. 1 Georgetown†	14	–	2	.875	35	–	3	.921
No. 15 Syracuse	9	–	7	.563	22	–	9	.710
Villanova	9	–	7	.563	25	–	10	.714
Pittsburgh	8	–	8	.500	17	–	12	.586
Boston College	7	–	9	.438	20	–	11	.645
Connecticut	6	–	10	.375	13	–	15	.464
Providence	3	–	13	.188	11	–	20	.355
Seton Hall	1	–	15	.063	10	–	18	.357
† 1985 Big East tournament winner As of April 1, 1985; Rankings from AP Poll

The 1984–85 St. John's Redmen basketball team represented St. John's University during the 1984–85 NCAA Division I men's basketball season. The team was coached by Lou Carnesecca in his seventeenth year at the school. Home games were played at Alumni Hall and Madison Square Garden and the team was a member of the Big East Conference. The team finished 31–4, with three of the four losses coming to Georgetown.

In the NCAA tournament St John's advanced to the Final Four with wins over Southern, Arkansas, Kentucky and NC State. This was the Redmen's first trip to the Final Four since 1952.

== Roster ==
1984–85 St. John's Redmen men's basketball team
Players
Coaches

Pos.	#	Name	Height	Weight	Year	Previous school	Hometown
F	-	John Hempel (redshirt)	6 ft 7 in (2.01 m)	225 lb (102 kg)	Jr	Union Catholic/UMass	Linden, NJ
C	10	Terry Bross	6 ft 8 in (2.03 m)	215 lb (98 kg)	Fr	Immaculata	Somerville, NJ
G/F	12	Ron Rowan	6 ft 4 in (1.93 m)	200 lb (91 kg)	RS Jr	Beaver Falls/Notre Dame	Beaver Falls, PA
G	13	Mark Jackson	6 ft 3 in (1.91 m)	195 lb (88 kg)	So	Bishop Loughlin	Brooklyn, NY
G/F	20	Chris Mullin (C)	6 ft 6 in (1.98 m)	205 lb (93 kg)	Sr	Power Memorial/Xaverian	Brooklyn, NY
F	21	Walter Berry	6 ft 8 in (2.03 m)	215 lb (98 kg)	So	Benjamin Franklin/San Jacinto	Bronx, NY
C	23	Bill Wennington (C)	7 ft 0 in (2.13 m)	245 lb (111 kg)	Sr	Long Island Lutheran	Wheatley Heights, NY
G	24	Mike Moses	5 ft 11 in (1.8 m)	160 lb (73 kg)	RS Sr	Tolentine/Florida	New York, NY
G/F	30	Willie Glass	6 ft 5 in (1.96 m)	205 lb (93 kg)	So	Atlantic City	Atlantic City, NJ
F	31	Shelton Jones	6 ft 7 in (2.01 m)	190 lb (86 kg)	Fr	Amityville Memorial	Amityville, NY
F	33	Ron Stewart (C)	6 ft 8 in (2.03 m)	212 lb (96 kg)	Sr	Brentwood	Brentwood, NY
G	40	Steve Shurina	6 ft 4 in (1.93 m)	185 lb (84 kg)	Fr	St. Francis Prep	Woodside, NY
G	44	Bob Antonelli	6 ft 3 in (1.91 m)	175 lb (79 kg)	Sr	Nanticoke/Wilkes	Nanticoke, PA
F/C	52	Robert Cornegy	6 ft 11 in (2.11 m)	210 lb (95 kg)	RS Fr	Andrew Jackson	Cambria Heights, NY

Head coach

- Lou Carnesecca (St. John's, '50)

Assistant coach(es)

- Brian Mahoney
- Al LoBalbo
- Ron Rutledge

Legend

- (C) Team captain
- (S) Suspended
- (I) Ineligible
- (W) Walk-on
- Injured
- Current redshirt

== Schedule and results ==
Date time, TV	Rank^{#}	Opponent^{#}	Result	Record	Site (attendance) city, state
Non-conference regular season
November 30, 1984*; 7:00 p.m.	No. 3	Lafayette; Joe Lapchick Memorial Tournament semifinal	W 93–47	1–0	Alumni Hall (6,158); Queens, NY
December 1, 1984*; 9:00 p.m.	No. 3	St. Bonaventure; Joe Lapchick Memorial Tournament final	W 58–57	2–0	Alumni Hall (6,287); Queens, NY
December 5, 1984*; 8:00 p.m.	No. 3	Fordham	W 47–46	3–0	Alumni Hall (6,250); Queens, NY
December 9, 1984*; 1:30 p.m., USA	No. 3	at Rutgers	W 77–61	4–0	Meadowlands Arena (9,178); East Rutherford, NJ
December 12, 1984*; 7:30 p.m.	No. 4	at Davidson	W 77–51	5–0	Charlotte Coliseum (3,512); Charlotte, NC
December 15, 1984*; 9:00 p.m.	No. 4	at Niagara	L 59–62	5–1	Niagara Falls Convention Center (6,000); Niagara Falls, NY
December 22, 1984*; 1:00 p.m., CBS	No. 8	UCLA	W 88–69	6–1	Madison Square Garden (15,256); New York, NY
December 27, 1984*; 7:00 p.m., MSG	No. 5	vs. Old Dominion; ECAC Holiday Festival semifinal	W 77–66	7–1	Madison Square Garden (12,570); New York, NY
December 29, 1984*; 2:30 p.m., MSG	No. 5	vs. No. 14 NC State; ECAC Holiday Festival championship	W 66–56	8–1	Madison Square Garden (15,090); New York, NY
Big East regular season
January 2, 1985; 8:00 p.m., TCS/Metrosports	No. 4	at Connecticut	W 57–51	9–1 (1–0)	Hartford Civic Center (12,924); Hartford, CT
January 5, 1985; 8:00 p.m., TCS/MetroSports	No. 4	Seton Hall	W 73–57	10–1 (2–0)	Alumni Hall (6,373); Queens, NY
January 7, 1985; 8:00 p.m., ESPN, TCS/MetroSports	No. 4	Villanova	W 76–71	11–1 (3–0)	Alumni Hall (6,492); Queens, NY
January 14, 1985; 8:00 p.m., ESPN, TCS/MetroSports	No. 3	at Pittsburgh	W 87–56	12–1 (4–0)	Fitzgerald Field House (6,670); Pittsburgh, PA
January 19, 1985; 1:30 p.m., CBS	No. 4	at No. 15 Boston College	W 66–59	13–1 (5–0)	Boston Garden (11,325); Boston, MA
January 23, 1985; 8:00 p.m., USA, TCS/MetroSports	No. 2	No. 11 Syracuse	W 82–80 ^{OT}	14–1 (6–0)	Madison Square Garden (19,591); New York, NY
January 26, 1985; 2:00 p.m., CBS	No. 2	at No. 1 Georgetown	W 66–65	15–1 (7–0)	Capital Centre (19,035); Landover, MD
January 30, 1985; 8:00 p.m., USA, TCS/MetroSports	No. 1	at Providence	W 77–60	16–1 (8–0)	Providence Civic Center (10,426); Providence, RI
February 2, 1985; 12:00 p.m., TCS MetroSports	No. 1	Connecticut	W 97–64	17–1 (9–0)	Alumni Hall (6,192); Queens, NY
February 4, 1985; 8:00 p.m., ESPN, TCS/MetroSports	No. 1	at Seton Hall	W 87–76	18–1 (10–0)	Meadowlands Arena (3,450); East Rutherford, NJ
February 9, 1985; 2:00 p.m., CBS	No. 1	at No. 19 Villanova	W 70–68	19–1 (11–0)	Spectrum (18,202); Philadelphia, PA
February 12, 1985*; 7:30 p.m.	No. 1	at Columbia	W 68–49	20–1	Levien Gymnasium (3,509); New York, NY
February 15, 1985; 8:00 p.m., TCS/MetroSports	No. 1	Pittsburgh	W 84–63	21–1 (12–0)	Alumni Hall (6,511); Queens, NY
February 17, 1985*; 2:00 p.m., NBC	No. 1	DePaul	W 93–80	22–1	Alumni Hall (6,597); Queens, NY
February 20, 1985; 8:00 p.m., USA, TCS/MetroSports	No. 1	No. 20 Boston College	W 71–69	23–1 (13–0)	Alumni Hall (6,569); Queens, NY
February 23, 1985; 1:30 p.m., CBS	No. 1	at No. 7 Syracuse	W 88–83	24–1 (14–0)	Carrier Dome (32,485); Syracuse, NY
February 27, 1985; 9:00 p.m., ESPN	No. 1	No. 2 Georgetown	L 69–85	24–2 (14–1)	Madison Square Garden (19,591); New York, NY
March 2, 1985; 12:00 p.m., TCS/MetroSports	No. 1	Providence	W 72–53	25–2 (15–1)	Alumni Hall (6,545); Queens, NY
Big East tournament
March 7, 1985; 7:00 p.m., TCS/MetroSports	(1) No. 2	vs. (8) Providence; Quarterfinals	W 90–62	26–2	Madison Square Garden (19,591); New York, NY
March 8, 1985; 9:00 p.m., TCS/MetroSports	(1) No. 2	vs. (4) Villanova; Semifinals	W 89–74	27–2	Madison Square Garden (19,591); New York, NY
March 9, 1985; 8:00 p.m., ESPN, TCS/MetroSports	(1) No. 2	vs. (2) No. 1 Georgetown; Championship	L 80–92	27–3	Madison Square Garden (19,591); New York, NY
NCAA tournament
March 14, 1985*; 2:07 p.m., ESPN, NCAA Productions	(1 W) No. 3	vs. (16 W) Southern; First round	W 83–59	28–3	Special Events Center (6,927); Salt Lake City, UT
March 16, 1985*; 4:30 p.m., CBS	(1 W) No. 3	vs. (9 W) Arkansas; Second round	W 68–65	29–3	Special Events Center (9,226); Salt Lake City, UT
March 22, 1985*; 10:09 p.m., CBS	(1 W) No. 3	vs. (12 W) Kentucky; Sweet Sixteen	W 86–70	30–3	McNichols Arena (17,022); Denver, CO
March 24, 1985*; 4:03 p.m., CBS	(1 W) No. 3	vs. (3 W) No. 16 NC State; Elite Eight	W 69–60	31–3	McNichols Arena (17,022); Denver, CO
March 30, 1985*; 6:12 p.m., CBS	(1 W) No. 3	vs. (1 E) No. 1 Georgetown; Final Four	L 59–77	31–4	Rupp Arena (23,135); Lexington, KY
*Non-conference game. ^{#}Rankings from AP Poll. (#) Tournament seedings in parentheses. W=West Region. E=East Region. All times are in Eastern Time.

== Rankings ==
Ranking movement Legend: ██ Improvement in ranking. ██ Decrease in ranking. RV=Received votes.
Poll	Pre	Wk 1	Wk 2	Wk 3	Wk 4	Wk 5	Wk 6	Wk 7	Wk 8	Wk 9	Wk 10	Wk 11	Wk 12	Wk 13	Wk 14	Wk 15	Final
AP	7	3	3	4	8	5	4	3	4	3	1	1	1	1	1	2	3
UPI		3	3	4	8	8	4	4	4	3	1	1	1	1	1	2	3

== Player statistics ==
Player	G	GS	MIN	FG	FGA	Pct.	FT	FTA	Pct.	REB	PF	AST	TO	BLK	STL	PTS	Avg.
Chris Mullin	35	35	37.9	7.2	13.8	.521	5.5	6.7	.824	169	68	151	90	17	73	694	19.8
Walter Berry	35	35	34.3	6.6	11.8	.558	3.8	5.3	.717	304	89	34	86	45	29	596	17.0
Bill Wennington	35	35	31.4	4.8	8.0	.602	2.9	3.6	.816	224	119	55	57	51	21	438	12.5
Willie Glass	35	35	23.7	2.7	4.8	.563	1.7	2.7	.611	113	58	49	48	13	24	246	7.0
Mike Moses	33	33	24.4	2.1	4.4	.483	1.6	2.0	.788	34	74	129	67	2	36	192	5.8
Mark Jackson	35	2	17.2	1.6	2.9	.564	1.9	2.6	.725	44	44	109	54	4	25	180	5.1
Ron Rowan	28	0	11.0	1.3	2.9	.463	0.9	1.2	.758	27	35	20	28	0	15	99	3.5
Shelton Jones	32	0	9.9	1.0	1.8	.542	0.8	1.3	.619	52	30	18	24	11	7	90	2.8
Bob Antonelli	3	0	2.3	1.0	1.7	.600	0.0	0.0	.000	3	0	0	0	0	0	6	2.0
Ron Stewart	35	0	11.5	0.7	1.5	.453	0.6	1.1	.553	55	53	13	0	4	7	69	2.0
Steve Shurina	17	0	3.5	0.2	0.4	.667	0.5	0.6	.818	7	0	5	0	0	0	17	1.0
Terry Bross	17	0	3.4	0.3	0.5	.556	0.4	0.5	.778	15	11	2	3	2	2	17	1.0
Rob Cornegy	14	0	2.3	0.1	0.4	.333	0.1	0.1	.500	5	8	1	5	1	1	5	0.4
St. John's	35			27.9	51.6	.542	19.8	26.6	.744	1055	590	586				2649	75.7
Opponents	35			26.3	57.5	.457	12.1	17.2	.701	1043	671	454				2263	64.7

== Local radio ==
Station	Play–by–play	Color analyst	Studio host
WCBS–AM 880	Spencer Ross		

== Team players drafted into the NBA ==
Round	Pick	Player	NBA club
1	7	Chris Mullin	Golden State Warriors
1	16	Bill Wennington	Dallas Mavericks
