= 1984–85 Connecticut Huskies men's basketball team =

American college basketball season

1984–85 Connecticut Huskies men's basketball
- Conference: Big East Conference
- Record: 13–15 (6–10 Big East)
- Head coach: Dom Perno (8th season)
- Assistant coaches: Greg Ashford; Howie Dickenman; Steve Siegrist
- Home arena: Hugh S. Greer Field House; Hartford Civic Center; New Haven Coliseum

1984–85 Big East men's basketball standings
	Conf.				Overall
Team	W		L	PCT	W		L	PCT
No. 3 St. John's	15	–	1	.938	31	–	4	.886
No. 1 Georgetown†	14	–	2	.875	35	–	3	.921
No. 15 Syracuse	9	–	7	.563	22	–	9	.710
Villanova	9	–	7	.563	25	–	10	.714
Pittsburgh	8	–	8	.500	17	–	12	.586
Boston College	7	–	9	.438	20	–	11	.645
Connecticut	6	–	10	.375	13	–	15	.464
Providence	3	–	13	.188	11	–	20	.355
Seton Hall	1	–	15	.063	10	–	18	.357
† 1985 Big East tournament winner As of April 1, 1985; Rankings from AP Poll

The 1984–85 Connecticut Huskies men's basketball team represented the University of Connecticut in the 1984–85 collegiate men's basketball season. The Huskies completed the season with a 13–15 overall record. The Huskies were members of the Big East Conference where they finished with a 6–10 record. The Huskies played their home games at Hugh S. Greer Field House in Storrs, Connecticut, the New Haven Coliseum in New Haven, Connecticut and the Hartford Civic Center in Hartford, Connecticut and they were led by eighth-year head coach Dom Perno.

== Schedule ==
Date time, TV	Rank^{#}	Opponent^{#}	Result	Record	Site (attendance) city, state
Regular Season
11/28/1984*		at Minnesota	L 60–61	0–1	Williams Arena; Minneapolis, Minnesota
12/4/1984*		at Yale	W 95–77	1–1	Payne Whitney Gymnasium; New Haven, Connecticut
12/6/1984*		Massachusetts	W 64–52	2–1	Hugh S. Greer Field House; Storrs, Connecticut
12/8/1984*		Ohio State	L 65–72	2–2	Hartford Civic Center; Hartford, Connecticut
12/11/1984*		Fairfield	L 74–81	2–3	New Haven Coliseum; New Haven, Connecticut
12/15/1984*		Rhode Island	W 93–63	3–3	Hugh S. Greer Field House; Storrs, Connecticut
12/28/1984*		New Hampshire; Connecticut Mutual Classic	W 81–57	4–3	Hartford Civic Center; Hartford, Connecticut
12/29/1984*		Iona; Connecticut Mutual Classic	L 54–55	4–4	Hartford Civic Center; Hartford, Connecticut
1/2/1985		St. John's	L 51–57	4–5 (0–1)	Hartford Civic Center; Hartford, Connecticut
1/5/1985		at Villanova	L 59–70 ^{OT}	4–6 (0–2)	Jake Nevin Field House; Villanova, Pennsylvania
1/9/1985		at Providence	L 66–75	4–7 (0–3)	Providence Civic Center; Providence, Rhode Island
1/12/1985		Pittsburgh	W 76–74	5–7 (1–3)	Hugh S. Greer Field House; Storrs, Connecticut
1/19/1985		at Syracuse; Rivalry	W 70–68	6–7 (2–3)	Carrier Dome; Syracuse, New York
1/23/1985		at Georgetown; Rivalry	L 66–79	6–8 (2–4)	Capital Centre; Landover, Maryland
1/26/1985		Boston College	L 77–78 ^{OT}	6–9 (2–5)	Hugh S. Greer Field House; Storrs, Connecticut
1/28/1985*		U.S. International	W 90–65	7–9	Hugh S. Greer Field House; Storrs, Connecticut
1/30/1985		Seton Hall	W 81–76	8–9 (3–5)	Hugh S. Greer Field House; Storrs, Connecticut
2/2/1985		at St. Johns	L 64–97	8–10 (3–6)	Carnesecca Arena; New York City
2/5/1985		Villanova	L 71–79	8–11 (3–7)	Hartford Civic Center; Hartford, Connecticut
2/9/1985		Providence	W 84–70	9–11 (4–7)	Hartford Civic Center; Hartford, Connecticut
2/13/1985		at Pittsburgh	L 71–78	9–12 (4–8)	Fitzgerald Field House; Pittsburgh
2/16/1985*		Delaware State	W 74–68	10–12	Hugh S. Greer Field House; Storrs, Connecticut
2/18/1985*		Holy Cross	W 71–58	11–12	Hugh S. Greer Field House; Storrs, Connecticut
2/20/1985		Syracuse; Rivalry	W 71–69	12–12 (5–8)	Hartford Civic Center; Hartford, Connecticut
2/23/1985		Georgetown; Rivalry	L 47–68	12–13 (5–9)	Hartford Civic Center; Hartford, Connecticut
2/25/1985		at Boston College	W 74–68	13–13 (6–9)	Roberts Center; Boston
3/2/1985		at Seton Hall	L 80–85	13–14 (6–10)	Brendan Byrne Arena; East Rutherford, New Jersey
Big East tournament
3/6/1985		vs. Georgetown; Quarterfinals/Rivalry	L 62–93	13–15	Madison Square Garden; New York
*Non-conference game. ^{#}Rankings from AP Poll. (#) Tournament seedings in parentheses. All times are in Eastern Time.

Schedule Source:
