= 1984–85 Syracuse Orangemen basketball team =

American college basketball season

1984–85 Syracuse Orangemen basketball

NCAA tournament, Second Round
- Conference: Big East Conference

Ranking
- Coaches: No. 15
- AP: No. 15
- Record: 22–9 (9–7 Big East)
- Head coach: Jim Boeheim (9th season)
- Assistant coaches: Bernie Fine (9th season); Wayne Morgan (1st season)
- Home arena: Carrier Dome

1984–85 Big East men's basketball standings
	Conf.				Overall
Team	W		L	PCT	W		L	PCT
No. 3 St. John's	15	–	1	.938	31	–	4	.886
No. 1 Georgetown†	14	–	2	.875	35	–	3	.921
No. 15 Syracuse	9	–	7	.563	22	–	9	.710
Villanova	9	–	7	.563	25	–	10	.714
Pittsburgh	8	–	8	.500	17	–	12	.586
Boston College	7	–	9	.438	20	–	11	.645
Connecticut	6	–	10	.375	13	–	15	.464
Providence	3	–	13	.188	11	–	20	.355
Seton Hall	1	–	15	.063	10	–	18	.357
† 1985 Big East tournament winner As of April 1, 1985; Rankings from AP Poll

The 1984–85 Syracuse Orangemen basketball team represented Syracuse University during the 1984–85 men's college basketball season. The head coach was Jim Boeheim, serving for his ninth season. The team played home games at the Carrier Dome in Syracuse, New York. The team finished with a 22–9 (9–7) record while making it to the second round of the NCAA tournament.

== Roster ==
1984–85 Syracuse Orange men's basketball team
Players
Coaches

Pos.	#	Name	Height	Weight	Year	Hometown
C	4	Rony Seikaly	6 ft 10 in (2.08 m)	240 lb (109 kg)	Fr	Athens, Greece
G	11	Greg Monroe	6 ft 3 in (1.91 m)	195 lb (88 kg)	So	Rochester, New York
SF	12	Rafael Addison	6 ft 7 in (2.01 m)	210 lb (95 kg)	Jr	Jersey City, New Jersey
G	24	Joel Katz	5 ft 11 in (1.8 m)	182 lb (83 kg)	So	San Juan, Puerto Rico
F	25	Howard Triche	6 ft 5 in (1.96 m)	215 lb (98 kg)	So	Syracuse, New York
F/C	30	Derek Brower	6 ft 9 in (2.06 m)	230 lb (104 kg)	Fr	North Babylon, New York
PG	31	Dwayne Washington	6 ft 2 in (1.88 m)	185 lb (84 kg)	So	Brooklyn, New York
PF	45	Wendell Alexis	6 ft 8 in (2.03 m)	210 lb (95 kg)	Jr	Queens, New York
F	50	Joey Kohm	6 ft 3 in (1.91 m)	205 lb (93 kg)	So	Ithaca, New York

Head coach

- Jim Boeheim (Syracuse)

Assistant coach(es)

- Bernie Fine (Syracuse)
- Wayne Morgan (St. Lawrence)
- Barry Copeland (Central Michigan)

Legend

- (C) Team captain
- (S) Suspended
- (I) Ineligible
- (W) Walk-on
- Injured
- Current redshirt

Roster

== Schedule ==
Date time, TV	Rank^{#}	Opponent^{#}	Result	Record	Site city, state
Non-conference regular season
Nov 28, 1984*		Cornell	W 65–53	1–0	Carrier Dome; Syracuse, New York
Dec 4, 1984*		Canisius	W 52–48	2–0	Carrier Dome; Syracuse, New York
Dec 7, 1984*		Maine	W 84–65	3–0	Carrier Dome; Syracuse, New York
Dec 8, 1984*		Lamar; Carrier Classic	W 68–58	4–0	Carrier Dome (20,214); Syracuse, New York
Dec 12, 1984*		at St. Bonaventure	W 71–59	5–0	Reilly Center; St. Bonaventure, New York
Dec 22, 1984*		Utica	W 84–63	6–0	Carrier Dome; Syracuse, New York
Dec 28, 1984*		vs. Detroit	W 77–63	7–0	
Dec 29, 1984*		vs. Duquesne	W 75–60	8–0	
Big East Regular Season
Jan 2, 1985		at Villanova	L 70–82	8–1 (0–1)	Villanova Field House; Philadelphia, Pennsylvania
Jan 9, 1985		No. 12 Boston College	W 64–58	9–1 (1–1)	Carrier Dome; Syracuse, New York
Jan 12, 1985		at Providence	W 71–63	10–1 (2–1)	Providence Civic Center; Providence, Rhode Island
Jan 16, 1985		at Seton Hall	W 90–80	11–1 (3–1)	Brendan Byrne Arena; East Rutherford, New Jersey
Jan 19, 1985		Connecticut	L 68–70	11–2 (3–2)	Carrier Dome; Syracuse, New York
Jan 23, 1985	No. 11	at No. 2 St. John's	L 80–82 ^{OT}	11–3 (3–3)	Madison Square Garden; New York, New York
Jan 26, 1985		at Pittsburgh	W 80–75	12–3 (4–3)	Fitzgerald Field House; Pittsburgh, Pennsylvania
Jan 28, 1985	No. 11	No. 2 Georgetown; Rivalry	W 65–63	13–3 (5–3)	Carrier Dome; Syracuse, New York
Feb 1, 1985		No. 18 Villanova	W 92–79	14–3 (6–3)	Carrier Dome; Syracuse, New York
Feb 3, 1985*		Marquette	W 71–53	15–3	Carrier Dome; Syracuse, New York
Feb 5, 1985*		vs. Boston College	L 66–67	15–4 (6–4)	
Feb 9, 1985*		at Notre Dame	W 65–62	16–4	Joyce Center; Notre Dame, Indiana
Feb 12, 1985		Providence	W 82–76	17–4 (7–4)	Carrier Dome; Syracuse, New York
Feb 14, 1985		Seton Hall	W 94–62	18–4 (8–4)	Carrier Dome; Syracuse, New York
Feb 16, 1985*		LSU	W 76–64	19–4	Carrier Dome; Syracuse, New York
Feb 20, 1985		at Connecticut	L 69–71	19–5 (8–5)	Hartford Civic Center; Storrs, Connecticut
Feb 23, 1985		No. 1 St. John's	L 83–88	19–6 (8–6)	Carrier Dome; Syracuse, New York
Feb 26, 1985		Pittsburgh	W 80–72	20–6 (9–6)	Carrier Dome; Syracuse, New York
Mar 1, 1985	No. 12	at No. 2 Georgetown; Rivalry	L 63–90	20–7 (9–7)	Capital Centre (19,335); Washington, D.C.
Big East Tournament
Mar 7, 1985*	No. 13	vs. Boston College; Quarterfinal	W 70–69	21–7	Madison Square Garden; New York, New York
Mar 8, 1985*	No. 13	vs. No. 1 Georgetown; Semifinal/Rivalry	L 65–74	21–8	Madison Square Garden; New York, New York
NCAA Tournament
Mar 15, 1985*	(7 E) No. 15	vs. (10 E) DePaul; First round	W 70–65	22–8	The Omni; Atlanta, Georgia
Mar 17, 1985*	(7 E) No. 15	vs. (2 E) No. 6 Georgia Tech; Second round	L 53–70	22–9	The Omni; Atlanta, Georgia
*Non-conference game. ^{#}Rankings from AP Poll. (#) Tournament seedings in parentheses.
