= Gary McLain =

American basketball player

Gary McLain is a former American collegiate basketball player at Villanova University.

== High school and college career ==
McLain was a highly recruited point guard while at Methuen High School. His high school coach Bill Donlon was his legal guardian. He was recruited by several college programs and chose to attend Villanova and was a part of the Villanova Wildcats's 1981 heralded recruiting class that also featured Ed Pinckney and Dwayne McClain, which the three had collective nickname of "The Expansion Crew". His basketball career lasted from 1981 to 1985 and played point guard. McLain graduated with a degree in Communication Arts.

McLain was starting point guard for Villanova in the 1985 squad which defeated Georgetown University, 66–64 to win to the NCAA title over the heavily favored Hoyas. He was named MVP of the game. This game is widely considered as one of the greatest NCAA tournament upsets of all time. This game is featured in the book The Perfect Game by Frank Fitzpatrick.

== After Villanova ==
McLain was selected in the seventh round of the 1985 NBA draft by the New Jersey Nets and was later selected by the Wildwood Aces of the United States Basketball League, but did not play for either team.

He worked as a recruiter with TLA Consultants.

== Sports Illustrated Article ==
In the March 1987 issue of Sports Illustrated, Gary McLain revealed that he had been using drugs since junior high school and began a cocaine habit while at Villanova. He also acknowledged using cocaine before Villanova's Final Four victory over Memphis State, but maintained that he did not use drugs before the 1985 national championship game against Georgetown.
