= Ed Pinckney =

American basketball player-coach (born 1963)

Personal information
- Born: March 27, 1963 (age 63) The Bronx, New York, U.S.
- Listed height: 6 ft 9 in (2.06 m)
- Listed weight: 240 lb (109 kg)

Career information
- High school: Adlai E. Stevenson (The Bronx, New York)
- College: Villanova (1981–1985)
- NBA draft: 1985: 1st round, 10th overall pick
- Drafted by: Phoenix Suns
- Playing career: 1985–1997
- Position: Small forward / power forward
- Number: 54
- Coaching career: 2003–2019

Career history

Playing
- 1985–1987: Phoenix Suns
- 1987–1989: Sacramento Kings
- 1989–1994: Boston Celtics
- 1994–1995: Milwaukee Bucks
- 1995–1996: Toronto Raptors
- 1996: Philadelphia 76ers
- 1996–1997: Miami Heat

Coaching
- 2003–2007: Villanova (assistant)
- 2007–2010: Minnesota Timberwolves (assistant)
- 2010–2015: Chicago Bulls (assistant)
- 2015–2016: Denver Nuggets (assistant)
- 2016–2019: Minnesota Timberwolves (assistant)

Career highlights
- No. 54 retired by Villanova Wildcats; NCAA champion (1985); NCAA Final Four Most Outstanding Player (1985); Robert V. Geasey Trophy winner (1985); 2× First-team All-Big East (1983, 1985); Second-team All-Big East (1984); Fourth-team Parade All-American (1981); McDonald's All-American (1981)

Career statistics
- Points: 5,378 (6.8 ppg)
- Rebounds: 3,952 (5.0 rpg)
- Steals: 612 (0.8 spg)
- Stats at NBA.com
- Stats at Basketball Reference
Medals
Representing United States
Men's basketball
Pan American Games
Gold medal – first place	1983 Caracas	Team competition

Edward Lewis Pinckney (born March 27, 1963) is an American former professional basketball player and coach. He played twelve seasons in the National Basketball Association (NBA).

== College career ==
He attended Villanova University and was a part of the Villanova Wildcats' 1981 heralded recruiting class that included Gary McLain, who was his roommate, and Dwayne McClain. The trio would call themselves "The Expansion Crew" during their time at Villanova.

A 6-foot-9-inch (2.06 m) forward from The Bronx, New York, Pinckney led regional eight-seed Villanova Wildcats to the NCAA title over the heavily favored Georgetown Hoyas in 1985. He was the recipient of the Tournament's Most Outstanding Player after registering 16 points and 6 rebounds in the 66–64 victory, widely considered one of the greatest NCAA tournament upsets of all time. This game is featured in the book The Perfect Game by Frank Fitzpatrick.

== NBA career ==
Also in 1985 he was selected tenth overall by the Phoenix Suns in the NBA draft and played for them from 1985 to 1987. He also played with the Sacramento Kings (1987–89), Boston Celtics (1989–94), Milwaukee Bucks (1994–95), Toronto Raptors (1995–96), Philadelphia 76ers (1995–96) and Miami Heat (1996–97). He retired in 1997.

As a Celtic, on April 19, 1994, Pinckney grabbed a career-high 22 rebounds and scored 21 points during a win against the Bucks. He participated in the first tip-off in Toronto Raptors franchise history, facing off against Yinka Dare of the New Jersey Nets on November 3, 1995.

== Career statistics ==
Memphis Tigers men's basketball

=== NBA ===
==== Regular season ====
Year	Team	GP	GS	MPG	FG%	3P%	FT%	RPG	APG	SPG	BPG	PPG
1985–86	Phoenix	80	24	20.0	.558	.000	.673	3.9	1.1	0.9	0.5	8.5
1986–87	Phoenix	80	65	28.1	.584	.000	.739	7.3	1.5	1.1	0.7	10.5
1987–88	Sacramento	79	7	14.9	.522	.000	.747	2.9	0.8	0.5	0.4	6.2
1988–89	Sacramento	51	24	26.2	.502	.000	.801	5.9	1.5	1.1	0.8	12.3
1988–89	Boston	29	9	23.4	.540	.000	.798	5.1	1.5	1.0	0.8	10.1
1989–90	Boston	77	50	14.1	.542	.000	.773	2.9	0.9	0.4	0.5	4.7
1990–91	Boston	70	16	16.6	.539	.000	.897	4.9	0.6	0.9	0.6	5.2
1991–92	Boston	81	36	23.7	.537	.000	.812	7.0	0.8	0.9	0.7	7.6
1992–93	Boston	7	5	21.6	.417	.000	.923	6.1	0.1	0.6	1.0	4.6
1993–94	Boston	76	35	20.1	.522	.000	.736	6.3	0.8	0.8	0.6	5.2
1994–95	Milwaukee	62	17	13.5	.495	.000	.710	3.4	0.3	0.5	0.3	2.3
1995–96	Toronto	47	24	21.9	.502	.000	.758	6.0	1.1	0.7	0.4	7.0
1995–96	Philadelphia	27	23	25.1	.529	.000	.764	6.5	0.8	1.2	0.4	5.6
1996–97	Miami	27	0	10.1	.535	.000	.800	2.4	0.2	0.3	0.3	2.4
Career		793	335	19.8	.535	.000	.765	5.0	0.9	0.8	0.5	6.8

==== Playoffs ====
Year	Team	GP	GS	MPG	FG%	3P%	FT%	RPG	APG	SPG	BPG	PPG
1988–89	Boston	3	0	15.0	.250	.000	1.000	1.7	0.3	0.3	0.3	2.7
1989–90	Boston	4	0	6.3	.857	.000	.778	1.5	0.0	0.0	0.0	4.8
1990–91	Boston	11	0	15.5	.762	.000	.810	3.6	0.2	0.5	0.2	4.5
1991–92	Boston	10	8	31.4	.603	.000	.839	8.4	0.7	1.2	0.9	9.6
1996–97	Miami	2	0	3.0	.667	.000	.000	0.0	0.5	0.0	0.0	2.0
Career		30	8	18.7	.614	.000	.825	4.5	0.4	0.6	0.4	5.9

=== College ===
Year	Team	GP	GS	MPG	FG%	3P%	FT%	RPG	APG	SPG	BPG	PPG
1981–82	Villanova	32	-	33.8	.640	-	.714	7.8	1.4	1.6	2.0	14.2
1982–83	Villanova	31	-	33.2	.568	-	.760	9.7	1.8	1.5	2.1	12.5
1983–84	Villanova	31	-	34.5	.604	-	.694	7.9	1.7	1.5	1.9	15.4
1984–85	Villanova	35	-	33.9	.600	-	.730	8.9	2.0	1.5	1.8	15.6
Career		129	-	33.8	.604	-	.723	8.6	1.8	1.5	2.0	14.5

== Broadcasting ==
Pinckney was a radio and television analyst for the Miami Heat from 1997 through 2003. He was the Heat's Director of Mentoring Programs from 2002 to 2003.

He spent the 2009-10 NBA season as a color analyst for the Philadelphia 76ers.

== Coaching ==
Pinckney served as an assistant coach for the Villanova Wildcats, under head coach Jay Wright from 2003 to 2007.

On September 21, 2007, Pinckney was hired as an assistant coach by the Minnesota Timberwolves. He joined the Chicago Bulls' coaching staff on September 13, 2010.

On July 4, 2015, he was hired to be an assistant coach for the Denver Nuggets.

On October 2, 2016, he returned to the Timberwolves as an assistant coach.

== Personal life ==
Ed and his wife Rose have three sons, Shae, Spencer, and Austin and one daughter, Andrea.

== NBA transactions ==
- Selected 10th overall by the Phoenix Suns in the 1985 NBA draft
- Traded to the Sacramento Kings for Eddie Johnson on June 21, 1987.
- Traded to the Boston Celtics along with Joe Kleine in exchange for Danny Ainge and Brad Lohaus on February 23, 1989.
- Traded to the Milwaukee Bucks along with rights to Andrei Fetisov in exchange for Blue Edwards and Derek Strong on June 29, 1994.
- Selected from the Bucks by the Toronto Raptors in the 1995 expansion draft on June 24, 1995.
- Traded to the Philadelphia 76ers along with Tony Massenburg in exchange for Sharone Wright on February 22, 1996.
- Waived by the 76ers on July 15, 1996.
- Signed as a free agent with the Miami Heat on September 25, 1996.
- Retired on October 1, 1997.
