= Roy Chipman =

American basketball coach (1939–1997)

Biographical details
- Born: April 24, 1939
- Died: August 10, 1997 (aged 58); Pittsburgh, Pennsylvania, U.S.

Coaching career (HC unless noted)
- 1968–1977: Hartwick
- 1977–1980: Lafayette
- 1980–1986: Pittsburgh

Head coaching record
- Overall: 326–160

Accomplishments and honors

Championships
- 2 Eastern 8 (1981–1982)

Leroy P. Chipman (April 24, 1939 – August 10, 1997) was an American basketball coach.

Chipman was the head coach at Hartwick. The Hawks advanced to the NCAA Division II Tournament seven times, including five consecutive bids from 1973 to 1977. He also served as athletic director while at Hartwick.

Chipman served as Pitt basketball coach from 1980 through 1986. During his six seasons at the university, he posted a record of 102 wins and 76 losses, and captured Eastern 8 Tournament championships in 1981 and 1982.

Under Chipman, Pitt also left the Eastern 8 for the higher-profile Big East Conference in 1982, advanced to the NCAA Tournament in 1981, 1982 and 1985, and the National Invitational Tournament in 1984 and 1986.

Players Chipman recruited to Pitt included Curtis Aiken, Demetreus Gore, Jerome Lane and Charles Smith. Smith was the 1988 Big East Player of the Year and Pitt's leading all-time scorer with 2,045.

Chipman died from colon and liver cancer on August 10, 1997.
