= Bill Martin (basketball) =

American basketball player (born 1962)

Personal information
- Born: August 16, 1962 (age 64) Washington, D.C., U.S.
- Listed height: 6 ft 7 in (2.01 m)
- Listed weight: 205 lb (93 kg)

Career information
- High school: McKinley (Washington, D.C.)
- College: Georgetown (1981–1985)
- NBA draft: 1985: 2nd round, 26th overall pick
- Drafted by: Indiana Pacers
- Playing career: 1985–1995
- Position: Small forward
- Number: 22, 26

Career history
- 1985–1986: Indiana Pacers
- 1986–1987: Cincinnati Slammers
- 1987: New York Knicks
- 1987: Staten Island Stallions
- 1987: Phoenix Suns
- 1987–1988: Topeka Sizzlers
- 1988–1989: Philips Milano
- 1989: Columbus Horizon
- 1989–1991: La Crosse Catbirds
- 1994–1995: Rockford Lightning

Career highlights
- CBA champion (1990); All-CBA Second Team (1987); CBA All-Defensive Second Team (1987); NCAA champion (1984); Second-team All-Big East (1985); Second-team Parade All-American (1981)
- Stats at NBA.com
- Stats at Basketball Reference

William Martin (born August 16, 1962) is an American former professional basketball player. He was a 6-foot-7-inch (201 cm) 205 pounds (93 kg) forward and played collegiately at Georgetown University from 1981–85.

Martin was selected with the 2nd pick of the second round in the 1985 NBA draft by the Indiana Pacers. He played 66 games for them in 1985-86, averaging 5.0 points, 1.9 rebounds and 0.8 assists per game. In his second and third seasons he played with the New York Knicks and Phoenix Suns, respectively.

Martin played in the Continental Basketball Association (CBA) for the Cincinnati Slammers, Topeka Sizzlers, La Crosse Catbirds and Rockford Lightning from 1986 to 1995. He won a CBA championship with the Catbirds in 1990. He was selected to the All-CBA Second Team and All-Defensive Second Team in 1987.

== Personal life ==
He was married to Janice Jackson and had a son, Christopher Martin who played at St. Patrick's and later played at Marshall University. Christopher transferred to Mount Saint Mary's. He finished his collegiate career at Savannah State University. Chris has his own business, CMartyfit. Bill married Jacki Carter in 2002 and had a daughter.

== Career statistics ==
Legend
GP	Games played	GS	Games started	MPG	Minutes per game
FG%	Field goal percentage	3P%	3-point field goal percentage	FT%	Free throw percentage
RPG	Rebounds per game	APG	Assists per game	SPG	Steals per game
BPG	Blocks per game	PPG	Points per game	**Bold**	Career high

=== NBA ===
==== Regular season ====
Year	Team	GP	GS	MPG	FG%	3P%	FT%	RPG	APG	SPG	BPG	PPG
1985–86	Indiana	**66**	0	**10.5**	**.480**	.000	.852	1.5	**.8**	.3	.1	**5.0**
1986–87	New York	8	0	8.5	.360	–	**.875**	.9	.0	**.5**	**.3**	3.1
1987–88	Phoenix	10	0	10.1	.314	.000	.615	**2.7**	.6	**.5**	.0	4.0
Career		84	0	10.2	.449	.000	.813	1.6	.7	.4	.1	4.7
