= 1984–85 DePaul Blue Demons men's basketball team =

American college basketball season

1984–85 DePaul Blue Demons men's basketball
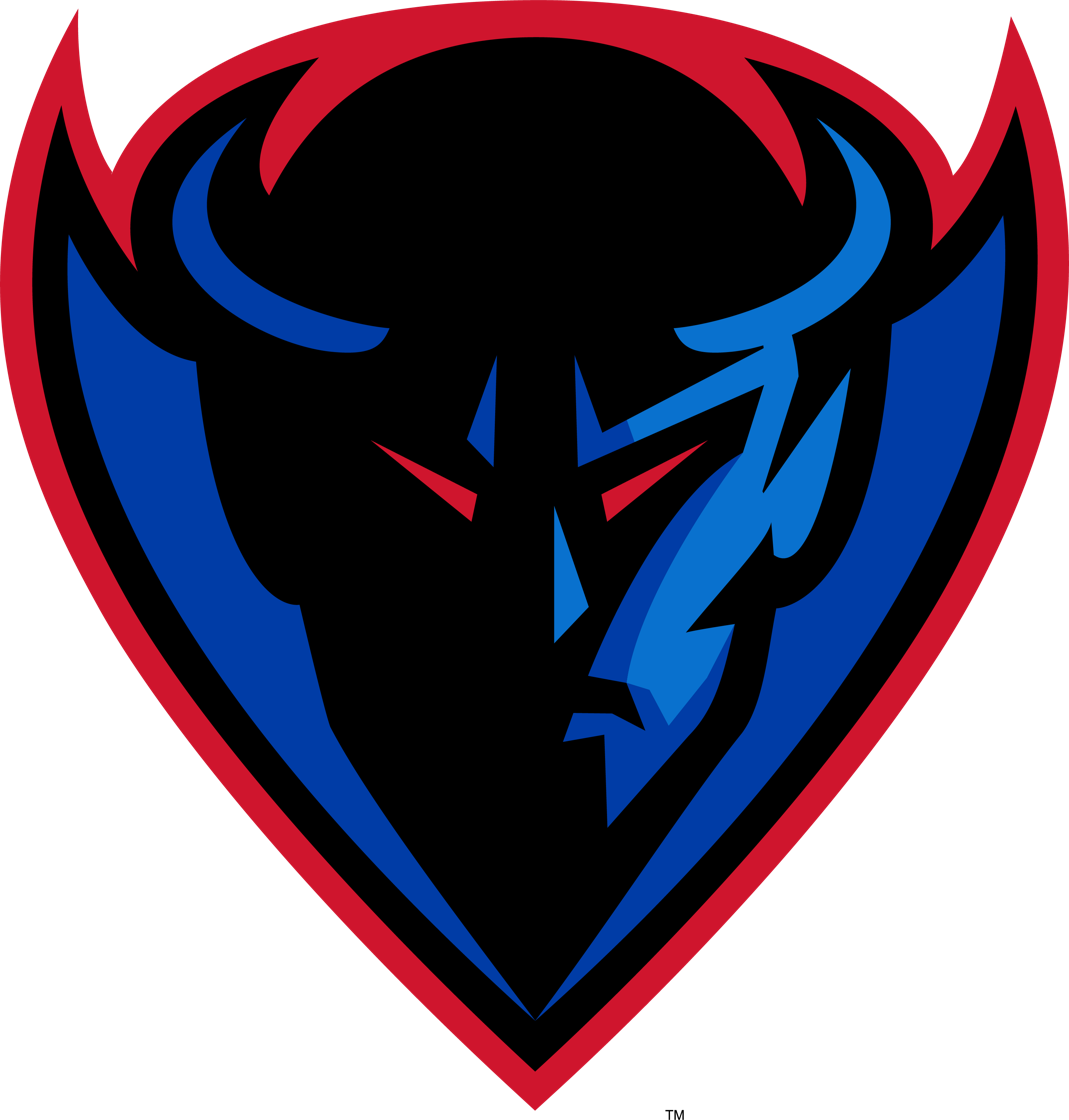

NCAA tournament
- Conference: Independent
- Record: 19–10
- Head coach: Joey Meyer (1st season)
- Assistant coaches: Kenny McReynolds; Jim Molinari (6th season); Jim Platt (1st season)
- Home arena: Rosemont Horizon

1984–85 NCAA Division I men's basketball independents standings
	Conf.				Overall
Team	W		L	PCT	W		L	PCT
Notre Dame		–		–	21	–	9	.700
Dayton		–		–	19	–	10	.655
DePaul		–		–	19	–	10	.655
Marquette		–		–	20	–	11	.645
Texas–San Antonio		–		–	18	–	10	.643
Chicago State		–		–	16	–	11	.593
Radford		–		–	16	–	12	.571
Utica		–		–	15	–	12	.556
Southwestern Louisiana		–		–	17	–	14	.548
Brooklyn		–		–	15	–	13	.536
Baptist		–		–	13	–	15	.464
Eastern Washington		–		–	12	–	15	.444
Monmouth		–		–	12	–	15	.444
Stetson		–		–	12	–	16	.429
Texas–Pan American		–		–	12	–	16	.429
New Orleans		–		–	11	–	19	.367
Florida A&M		–		–	10	–	18	.357
Central Florida		–		–	10	–	18	.357
Tennessee State		–		–	9	–	19	.321
Augusta State		–		–	8	–	20	.286
Campbell		–		–	5	–	22	.185
U.S. International		–		–	1	–	27	.036
Rankings from AP Poll

The 1984–85 DePaul Blue Demons men's basketball team represented DePaul University during the 1984–85 NCAA Division I men's basketball season. They were led by new head coach Joey Meyer, in his 1st season after ten years as an assistant, and played their home games at the Rosemont Horizon in Rosemont.

== Roster ==
1984–85 DePaul Blue Demons men's basketball team
Players
Coaches

Pos.	#	Name	Height	Weight	Year	Previous school	Hometown
F	3	Lawrence West	6 ft 7 in (2.01 m)	195 lb (88 kg)	So	Morse	San Diego, CA
G	10	Kenny Patterson	6 ft 2 in (1.88 m)	175 lb (79 kg)	Sr	Forest Hills	Queens, NY
G	11	Randy Pettus	6 ft 0 in (1.83 m)	170 lb (77 kg)	Fr	Waynesboro Central	Waynesboro, MS
G	14	Andy Laux	6 ft 5 in (1.96 m)	195 lb (88 kg)	Fr	Immaculate Conception	Elmhurst, IL
G	20	Tony Jackson	6 ft 5 in (1.96 m)	195 lb (88 kg)	Jr	Bishop O'Dowd	San Francisco, CA
F	23	Tyrone Corbin	6 ft 6 in (1.98 m)	210 lb (95 kg)	Sr	Carver	Columbia, SC
C	32	Lemone Lampley	6 ft 11 in (2.11 m)	205 lb (93 kg)	Jr	Chicago Vocational	Chicago, IL
G	33	Marvin Woods	6 ft 4 in (1.93 m)	190 lb (86 kg)	Fr	Aliquippa	Aliquippa, PA
F	34	Kevin Holmes	6 ft 8 in (2.03 m)	220 lb (100 kg)	Jr	Cleveland	Los Angeles, CA
F/C	35	Dallas Comegys	6 ft 9 in (2.06 m)	195 lb (88 kg)	So	Roman Catholic	Philadelphia, PA
C	51	Marty Embry	6 ft 9 in (2.06 m)	240 lb (109 kg)	Jr	Flint Central	Flint, MI
F	55	Kevin Golden	6 ft 8 in (2.03 m)	200 lb (91 kg)	Fr	Lumen Christi	Jackson, MI

Head coach

- Joey Meyer

Assistant coach(es)

- Kenny McReynolds
- Jim Molinari (Illinois Wesleyan)
- Jim Platt (Concordia (IL))

Legend

- (C) Team captain
- (S) Suspended
- (I) Ineligible
- (W) Walk-on
- Injured
- Current redshirt

Roster

== Schedule and results ==
Date time, TV	Rank^{#}	Opponent^{#}	Result	Record	Site city, state
Regular Season
Nov 24, 1984*	No. 3	Northern Illinois	W 59–58	1–0	Rosemont Horizon (15,645); Rosemont, Illinois
Dec 1, 1984*	No. 2	UCLA	W 80–61	2–0	Rosemont Horizon (17,269); Rosemont, Illinois
Dec 3, 1984*	No. 2	Chico State	W 77–37	3–0	Rosemont Horizon (7,528); Rosemont, Illinois
Dec 5, 1984*	No. 2	at Illinois State	W 84–71	4–0	Horton Field House (7,775); Normal, Illinois
Dec 8, 1984*	No. 2	Notre Dame	W 95–83	5–0	Rosemont Horizon (17,499); Rosemont, Illinois
Dec 12, 1984*	No. 2	at Penn State	W 78–61	6–0	Rec Hall (8,157); University Park, Pennsylvania
Dec 15, 1984*	No. 2	at No. 1 Georgetown	L 57–77	6–1	Capital Centre (19,135); Washington, D.C.
Dec 19, 1984*	No. 5	at Western Michigan	L 64–65	6–2	University Arena (6,754); Kalamazoo, Michigan
Dec 22, 1984*	No. 5	Northwestern	W 61–56	7–2	Rosemont Horizon (14,981); Rosemont, Illinois
Dec 27, 1984*	No. 9	Creighton	W 87–58	8–2	Rosemont Horizon (14,198); Rosemont, Illinois
Jan 3, 1985*	No. 10	Saint Mary's	W 76–53	9–2	Rosemont Horizon (11,797); Rosemont, Illinois
Jan 4, 1985*	No. 10	at UAB	L 59–66	9–3	Birmingham-Jefferson Civic Center (17,222); Birmingham, Alabama
Jan 12, 1985*		Houston	W 69–58	10–3	Rosemont Horizon (17,499); Rosemont, Illinois
Jan 14, 1985*		Old Dominion	W 64–58	11–3	Rosemont Horizon (11,752); Rosemont, Illinois
Jan 20, 1985*		at Notre Dame	W 71–66	12–3	Athletic & Convocation Center (11,335); South Bend, Indiana
Jan 21, 1985*		Eastern Washington	W 72–50	13–3	Rosemont Horizon (9,279); Rosemont, Illinois
Jan 26, 1985*	No. 7	at Dayton	L 64–65	13–4	University of Dayton Arena (13,485); Dayton, Ohio
Jan 29, 1985*		vs. Princeton	W 56–42	14–4	Jadwin Gymnasium (6,347); Princeton, New Jersey
Feb 2, 1985*		at Louisville	L 73–77	14–5	Freedom Hall (19,210); Louisville, Kentucky
Feb 6, 1985*	No. 18	Dayton	L 63–67	14–6	Rosemont Horizon (16,803); Rosemont, Illinois
Feb 9, 1985*		Pepperdine	W 90–65	15–6	Rosemont Horizon (14,355); Rosemont, Illinois
Feb 12, 1985*		at Loyola–Chicago	L 71–78	15–7	Rosemont Horizon (13,909); Rosemont, Illinois
Feb 17, 1985*		at No. 1 St. John's	L 80–93	15–8	Madison Square Garden (6,597); New York, New York
Feb 20, 1985*		Indiana State	W 77–65	16–8	Rosemont Horizon (12,254); Rosemont, Illinois
Feb 23, 1985*		La Salle	W 87–60	17–8	Rosemont Horizon (12,773); Rosemont, Illinois
Mar 2, 1985*		Marquette	W 69–52	18–8	Rosemont Horizon (17,499); Rosemont, Illinois
Mar 5, 1985*		at Pan American	W 65–55	19–8	UTPA Fieldhouse (5,350); Edinburg, Texas
Mar 9, 1985*		at Marquette	L 64–68	19–9	MECCA Arena (11,052); Milwaukee, Wisconsin
NCAA Tournament
Mar 15, 1985*		vs. No. 15 Syracuse; First round	L 65–70	19–10	The Omni (15,273); Atlanta, Georgia
*Non-conference game. ^{#}Rankings from AP Poll. (#) Tournament seedings in parentheses. E=East.
