= 1984–85 NCAA Division I men's basketball season =

Basketball season

- Preseason AP No. 1: Georgetown Hoyas
- NCAA Tournament: 1985
- Tournament dates: March 14 – April 1, 1985
- National Championship: Rupp Arena; Lexington, Kentucky
- NCAA Champions: Villanova Wildcats
- Other champions: UCLA Bruins (NIT)
- Player of the Year (Naismith, Wooden): Patrick Ewing, Georgetown Hoyas (Naismith); Chris Mullin, St. John's Redmen (Wooden)

The 1984–85 NCAA Division I men's basketball season began in November 1984 and ended with the Final Four in Lexington, Kentucky on April 1, 1985. The Villanova Wildcats won their first NCAA national championship with a 66–64 victory over the defending champion, top-ranked Georgetown Hoyas. It was the second time in three seasons that the national champion had 10 losses.

== Season headlines ==
- The 1985 NCAA Tournament was the first to feature a 64-team field, expanding from 53 teams the year before.
- Three teams from the Big East Conference (Georgetown, St. John's, and Villanova) advanced to the NCAA tournament's Final Four. It was the first time that three teams from the same conference reached the Final Four.
- Georgetown was the first defending champion to return to the Final Four since the 1975–76 UCLA Bruins did it in the 1976 NCAA Tournament.
- Basketball analysts consider Villanova's defeat of Georgetown in the 1985 NCAA Division I men's basketball championship game to be one of the biggest upsets in NCAA tournament history. Villanova made 22 of 28 field goal attempts for a field goal percentage of 78.6 percent, a record for an NCAA championship game. Villanova won its first national championship and became the first unranked team to win the national championship.
- Xavier McDaniel of Wichita State became the first player to lead the United States in scoring and rebounding in the same season.
- On March 27, 1985, John "Hot Rod" Williams was among four Tulane players arrested on charges of accepting money and cocaine in an alleged point shaving scheme. The incident prompted Tulane to disband its men's basketball program at the end of the season. The school did not resume men's basketball competition until the 1989–90 season.

== Major rule changes ==
Beginning in 1984–85, the following rules changes were implemented:

- The coaching box was introduced, whereby a coach and all bench personnel had to remain in the 28-foot-long (8.5 m) coaching box unless seeking information from the scorers’ table.

== Season outlook ==
=== Pre-season polls ===
The top 20 from the AP Poll during the pre-season.

Associated Press
Ranking	Team
1	Georgetown
2	Illinois
3	DePaul
4	Indiana
5	Oklahoma
6	Duke
7	St. John's
8	Memphis State
9	Washington
10	SMU
11	UNLV
12	Syracuse
13	NC State
14	LSU
15	Virginia Tech
16	Arkansas
17	Louisville
18	Kentucky
19	Kansas
20	Georgia Tech

== Conference membership changes ==
School	Former conference	New conference
American Eagles	East Coast Conference	ECAC South Conference
Augusta State Jaguars	Division II independent	Division I independent
Central Florida (UCF) Knights	Sunshine State Conference (D-II)	Division I independent
Chicago State Cougars	NAIA Independent	Division I independent
Florida A&M Rattlers	Mid-Eastern Athletic Conference	Division I independent
Georgia State Panthers	Division I independent	Trans America Athletic Conference
Hartford Hawks	Division II independent	ECAC North Conference
Morgan State Bears	Division II independent	Mid-Eastern Athletic Conference
Nicholls State Colonels	Trans America Athletic Conference (provisional)	Gulf Star Conference
Northwestern State Demons	Trans America Athletic Conference	Gulf Star Conference
Radford Highlanders	Division II independent	Division I independent
Sam Houston State Bearkats	Lone Star Conference (D-II)	Gulf Star Conference
Siena Saints	ECAC Metro Conference	ECAC North Conference
Southeastern Louisiana Lions	Division I independent	Gulf Star Conference
Southwest Texas State Bobcats	Lone Star Conference (D-II)	Gulf Star Conference
Stephen F. Austin Lumberjacks	Lone Star Conference (D-II)	Gulf Star Conference
UNC Wilmington Seahawks	Division I independent	ECAC South Conference

NOTE: Prior to the season, Nicholls State left the Trans America Athletic Conference after two seasons as a provisional member, during which it played no conference games.

== Regular season ==
=== Conferences ===
==== Conference winners and tournaments ====
Conference	Regular season winner	Conference player of the year	Conference Coach of the Year	Conference tournament	Tournament venue (City)	Tournament winner
AMCU–8	Cleveland State	Jon Collins, Eastern Illinois	Kevin Mackey, Cleveland State	1985 AMCU-8 men's basketball tournament	Hammons Student Center (Springfield, Missouri)	Eastern Illinois
Atlantic 10 Conference	West Virginia	Granger Hall, Temple	John Chaney, Temple	1985 Atlantic 10 men's basketball tournament	Rutgers Athletic Center (Piscataway, New Jersey)	Temple
Atlantic Coast Conference	Georgia Tech, North Carolina & NC State	Len Bias, Maryland	Bobby Cremins, Georgia Tech	1985 ACC men's basketball tournament	The Omni (Atlanta, Georgia)	Georgia Tech
Big East Conference	St. John's	Patrick Ewing, Georgetown & Chris Mullin, St. John's	Lou Carnesecca, St. John's	1985 Big East men's basketball tournament	Madison Square Garden (New York City, New York)	Georgetown
Big Eight Conference	Oklahoma	Wayman Tisdale, Oklahoma	Billy Tubbs, Oklahoma	1985 Big Eight Conference men's basketball tournament	Kemper Arena (Kansas City, Missouri) (Semifinals and Finals)	Oklahoma
Big Sky Conference	Nevada–Reno	Larry Krystkowiak, Montana	Sonny Allen, Nevada–Reno	1985 Big Sky Conference men's basketball tournament	Dee Events Center (Ogden, Utah)	Nevada–Reno
Big Ten Conference	Michigan	None Selected	Bill Frieder, Michigan	No Tournament		
East Coast Conference	Bucknell	Jaye Andrews, Bucknell	Charlie Woollum, Bucknell & Ronald Rainey, Delaware	1985 East Coast Conference men's basketball tournament	Towson Center (Towson, Maryland)	Lehigh
ECAC Metro	Marist	Carey Scurry, Long Island	Tom Green, Fairleigh Dickinson	1985 ECAC Metro men's basketball tournament	Reitz Arena (Baltimore, Maryland)	Fairleigh Dickinson
ECAC North	Canisius & Northeastern	Reggie Lewis, Northeastern	John Griffin, Siena	1985 ECAC North men's basketball tournament	Matthews Arena (Boston, Massachusetts)	Northeastern
ECAC South	Navy & Richmond	David Robinson, Navy	Paul Evans, Navy	1985 ECAC South men's basketball tournament	William & Mary Hall (Williamsburg, Virginia)	Navy
Ivy League	Penn	Ken Bantum, Cornell	None selected	No Tournament		
Metro Atlantic Athletic Conference	Iona	Randy Cozzens, Army	Les Wothke, Army	1985 MAAC men's basketball tournament	Meadowlands Arena (East Rutherford, New Jersey)	Iona
Metro Conference	Memphis State	Keith Lee, Memphis State	Tony Yates, Cincinnati	1985 Metro Conference men's basketball tournament	Freedom Hall (Louisville, Kentucky)	Memphis State
Mid-American Conference	Ohio	Ron Harper, Miami (OH)	Danny Nee, Ohio	1985 MAC men's basketball tournament	Centennial Hall (Toledo, Ohio)	Ohio
Mid-Eastern Athletic Conference	North Carolina A&T	Eric Boyd, North Carolina A&T	Don Corbett, North Carolina A&T	1985 MEAC men's basketball tournament	Palestra (Philadelphia, Pennsylvania)	North Carolina A&T
Midwestern City Conference	Loyola (IL)	Alfredrick Hughes, Loyola (IL)	Gene Sullivan, Loyola (IL)	1985 Midwestern City Conference men's basketball tournament	Mabee Center (Tulsa, Oklahoma)	Loyola (IL)
Missouri Valley Conference	Tulsa	Xavier McDaniel, Wichita State	Nolan Richardson, Tulsa	1985 Missouri Valley Conference men's basketball tournament	Tulsa Convention Center (Tulsa, Oklahoma)	Wichita State
Ohio Valley Conference	Tennessee Tech	Stephen Kite, Tennessee Tech	Tom Deaton, Tennessee Tech	1985 Ohio Valley Conference men's basketball tournament	Murphy Center (Murfreesboro, Tennessee)	Middle Tennessee State
Pacific-10 Conference	USC & Washington	Wayne Carlander, USC	Stan Morrison, USC	No Tournament		
Pacific Coast Athletic Association	UNLV	Richie Adams, UNLV	Jerry Tarkanian, UNLV	1985 Pacific Coast Athletic Association men's basketball tournament	The Forum (Inglewood, California)	UNLV
Southeastern Conference	LSU	Kenny Walker, Kentucky	Bob Boyd, Mississippi State & Hugh Durham, Georgia	1985 SEC men's basketball tournament	Birmingham–Jefferson Convention Complex (Birmingham, Alabama)	Auburn
Southern Conference	Tennessee–Chattanooga	Regan Truesdale, The Citadel	Marty Fletcher, VMI	1985 Southern Conference men's basketball tournament	Asheville Civic Center (Asheville, North Carolina)	Marshall
Southland Conference	Louisiana Tech	Joe Dumars, McNeese State	Andy Russo, Louisiana Tech	1985 Southland Conference men's basketball tournament	Thomas Assembly Center (Ruston, Louisiana)	Louisiana Tech
Southwest Conference	Texas Tech	Bubba Jennings, Texas Tech	Gerald Myers, Texas Tech	1985 Southwest Conference men's basketball tournament	Reunion Arena (Dallas, Texas)	Texas Tech
Southwestern Athletic Conference	Alcorn State	Mike Phelps, Alcorn State	Davey Whitney, Alcorn State	1985 SWAC men's basketball tournament	Mississippi Coliseum (Jackson, Mississippi)	Southern
Sun Belt Conference	VCU	Terry Catledge, South Alabama	Gene Bartow, UAB	1985 Sun Belt Conference men's basketball tournament	Hampton Coliseum (Hampton, Virginia)	VCU
Trans America Athletic Conference	Georgia Southern	Sam Mitchell, Mercer	Bill Bibb, Mercer	1985 TAAC men's basketball tournament	Hanner Fieldhouse (Statesboro, Georgia)	Mercer
West Coast Athletic Conference	Pepperdine	Dwayne Polee, Pepperdine	Jim Harrick, Pepperdine	No Tournament		
Western Athletic Conference	UTEP	Timo Saarelainen, BYU	Smokey Gaines, San Diego State	1985 WAC men's basketball tournament	Special Events Center (El Paso, Texas)	San Diego State

==== Conference standings ====
1984–85 AMCU-8 Conference men's basketball standings
	Conf.				Overall
Team	W		L	PCT	W		L	PCT
Cleveland State	11	–	3	.786	21	–	8	.724
Western Illinois	10	–	4	.714	14	–	14	.500
Eastern Illinois †	9	–	5	.643	20	–	10	.667
Southwest Missouri State	8	–	6	.571	17	–	13	.567
Illinois–Chicago	7	–	7	.500	14	–	14	.500
Northern Iowa	6	–	8	.429	12	–	16	.429
Valparaiso	4	–	10	.286	8	–	20	.286
Wisconsin–Green Bay	1	–	13	.071	4	–	24	.143
† 1985 AMCU-8 tournament winner Rankings from

1984–85 Atlantic 10 men's basketball standings
	Conf.				Overall
Team	W		L	PCT	W		L	PCT
West Virginia	16	–	2	.889	20	–	9	.690
Temple †	15	–	3	.833	25	–	6	.806
Saint Joseph's	13	–	5	.722	19	–	12	.613
Rutgers	9	–	9	.500	16	–	14	.533
George Washington	9	–	9	.500	14	–	14	.500
UMass	9	–	9	.500	13	–	15	.464
St. Bonaventure	7	–	11	.389	14	–	15	.483
Duquesne	6	–	12	.333	12	–	18	.400
Penn State	4	–	14	.222	8	–	19	.296
Rhode Island	2	–	16	.111	8	–	20	.286
† 1985 Atlantic 10 Tournament winner Rankings from AP Poll

1984–85 ACC men's basketball standings
	Conf.				Overall
Team	W		L	PCT	W		L	PCT
No. 6 Georgia Tech †	9	–	5	.643	27	–	8	.771
No. 7 North Carolina	9	–	5	.643	27	–	9	.750
No. 16 NC State	9	–	5	.643	23	–	10	.697
No. 10 Duke	8	–	6	.571	23	–	8	.742
Maryland	8	–	6	.571	25	–	12	.676
Clemson	5	–	9	.357	16	–	13	.552
Wake Forest	5	–	9	.357	15	–	14	.517
Virginia	3	–	11	.214	17	–	16	.515
† 1985 ACC tournament winner Rankings from AP Poll

1984–85 Big East men's basketball standings
	Conf.				Overall
Team	W		L	PCT	W		L	PCT
No. 3 St. John's	15	–	1	.938	31	–	4	.886
No. 1 Georgetown†	14	–	2	.875	35	–	3	.921
No. 15 Syracuse	9	–	7	.563	22	–	9	.710
Villanova	9	–	7	.563	25	–	10	.714
Pittsburgh	8	–	8	.500	17	–	12	.586
Boston College	7	–	9	.438	20	–	11	.645
Connecticut	6	–	10	.375	13	–	15	.464
Providence	3	–	13	.188	11	–	20	.355
Seton Hall	1	–	15	.063	10	–	18	.357
† 1985 Big East tournament winner As of April 1, 1985; Rankings from AP Poll

1984–85 Big Eight Conference men's basketball standings
	Conf.				Overall
Team	W		L	PCT	W		L	PCT
No. 4 Oklahoma†	13	–	1	.929	31	–	6	.838
No. 13 Kansas	11	–	3	.786	26	–	8	.765
Iowa State	7	–	7	.500	21	–	13	.618
Missouri	7	–	7	.500	18	–	14	.563
Kansas State	5	–	9	.357	14	–	14	.500
Colorado	5	–	9	.357	11	–	17	.393
Nebraska	5	–	9	.357	16	–	14	.533
Oklahoma State	3	–	11	.214	12	–	16	.429
† 1985 Big Eight tournament winner Rankings from AP Poll

1984–85 Big Sky men's basketball standings
	Conf.				Overall
Team	W		L	PCT	W		L	PCT
Nevada †	11	–	3	.786	21	–	10	.677
Montana	10	–	4	.714	22	–	7	.759
Weber State	9	–	5	.643	20	–	9	.690
Northern Arizona	8	–	6	.571	17	–	12	.586
Montana State	7	–	7	.500	11	–	17	.393
Boise State	5	–	9	.357	16	–	13	.552
Idaho State	5	–	9	.357	15	–	18	.455
Idaho	1	–	13	.071	8	–	22	.267
† 1985 Big Sky tournament winner

1984–85 Big Ten Conference men's basketball standings
	Conf.				Overall
Team	W		L	PCT	W		L	PCT
No. 2 Michigan	16	–	2	.889	26	–	4	.867
No. 12 Illinois	12	–	6	.667	26	–	9	.743
Purdue	11	–	7	.611	20	–	9	.690
Ohio State	11	–	7	.611	20	–	10	.667
Iowa	10	–	8	.556	21	–	11	.656
Michigan State	10	–	8	.556	19	–	10	.655
Indiana	7	–	11	.389	19	–	14	.576
Minnesota	6	–	12	.333	13	–	15	.464
Wisconsin	5	–	13	.278	14	–	14	.500
Northwestern	2	–	16	.111	6	–	22	.214
Rankings from AP Poll

1984–85 ECC men's basketball standings
	Conf.				Overall
Team	W		L	PCT	W		L	PCT
Bucknell	10	–	4	.714	19	–	10	.655
Lafayette	8	–	6	.571	15	–	13	.536
Drexel	8	–	6	.571	10	–	18	.357
Rider	7	–	7	.500	14	–	15	.483
Delaware	7	–	7	.500	12	–	16	.429
Lehigh †	6	–	8	.429	12	–	19	.387
Hofstra	5	–	9	.357	14	–	15	.483
Towson State	5	–	9	.357	7	–	21	.250
† 1985 ECC tournament winner Rankings from AP poll

1984–85 ECAC Metro men's basketball standings
	Conf.				Overall
Team	W		L	PCT	W		L	PCT
Marist	11	–	3	.786	17	–	12	.586
Fairleigh Dickinson †	10	–	4	.714	21	–	10	.677
Long Island	9	–	5	.643	15	–	13	.536
Loyola (MD)	8	–	6	.571	16	–	14	.533
Saint Francis (PA)	6	–	8	.429	9	–	19	.321
Wagner	5	–	9	.357	11	–	17	.393
Robert Morris	4	–	10	.286	9	–	19	.321
St. Francis (NY)	3	–	11	.214	7	–	21	.250
† 1985 ECAC Metro tournament winner Rankings from AP Poll

1984–85 ECAC North men's basketball standings
	Conf.				Overall
Team	W		L	PCT	W		L	PCT
Canisius	13	–	3	.813	20	–	10	.667
Northeastern †	13	–	3	.813	22	–	9	.710
Siena	12	–	4	.750	22	–	7	.759
Niagara	11	–	5	.688	16	–	12	.571
Boston University	9	–	7	.563	15	–	15	.500
Vermont	5	–	11	.313	9	–	19	.321
Maine	5	–	11	.313	11	–	17	.393
New Hampshire	4	–	12	.250	7	–	22	.241
Colgate	0	–	16	.000	5	–	21	.192
Hartford		–		–	7	–	21	.250
† 1985 ECAC North tournament winner

1984–85 ECAC South men's basketball standings
	Conf.				Overall
Team	W		L	PCT	W		L	PCT
Navy †	11	–	3	.786	26	–	6	.813
Richmond	11	–	3	.786	21	–	11	.656
George Mason	10	–	4	.714	18	–	11	.621
William & Mary	9	–	5	.643	16	–	12	.571
James Madison	7	–	7	.500	14	–	14	.500
UNC Wilmington	4	–	10	.286	12	–	16	.429
American	3	–	11	.214	9	–	19	.321
East Carolina	1	–	13	.071	7	–	21	.250
† 1985 ECAC South tournament winner Rankings from AP Poll

1984–85 Ivy League men's basketball standings
	Conf.				Overall
Team	W		L	PCT	W		L	PCT
Penn	10	–	4	.714	13	–	14	.481
Columbia	9	–	5	.643	13	–	13	.500
Cornell	8	–	6	.571	14	–	12	.538
Harvard	7	–	7	.500	15	–	9	.625
Yale	7	–	7	.500	14	–	12	.538
Princeton	7	–	7	.500	11	–	15	.423
Brown	5	–	9	.357	9	–	18	.333
Dartmouth	3	–	11	.214	5	–	21	.192
Rankings from AP Poll

1984–85 Metro Conference men's basketball standings
	Conf.				Overall
Team	W		L	PCT	W		L	PCT
No. 5 Memphis State †	13	–	1	.929	31	–	4	.886
Virginia Tech	10	–	4	.714	20	–	9	.690
Cincinnati	8	–	6	.571	17	–	14	.548
South Carolina	6	–	8	.429	15	–	13	.536
Tulane	6	–	8	.429	15	–	13	.536
Louisville	6	–	8	.429	19	–	18	.514
Florida State	4	–	10	.286	14	–	16	.467
Southern Miss	3	–	11	.214	7	–	21	.250
† 1985 Metro Conference tournament winner Rankings from AP Poll

1984–85 MAAC men's basketball standings
	Conf.				Overall
Team	W		L	PCT	W		L	PCT
Iona †	11	–	3	.786	26	–	5	.839
Fordham	9	–	5	.643	19	–	12	.613
Holy Cross	8	–	6	.571	9	–	19	.321
La Salle	8	–	6	.571	15	–	13	.536
Army	7	–	7	.500	16	–	13	.552
Saint Peter's	5	–	9	.357	15	–	14	.517
Manhattan	4	–	10	.286	8	–	20	.286
Fairfield	4	–	10	.286	11	–	17	.393
† 1985 MAAC tournament winner Rankings from AP Poll

1984–85 Mid-American Conference men's basketball standings
	Conf.				Overall
Team	W		L	PCT	W		L	PCT
Ohio †	14	–	4	.778	22	–	8	.733
Miami	13	–	5	.722	20	–	11	.645
Toledo	11	–	7	.611	16	–	12	.571
Kent State	11	–	7	.611	17	–	13	.567
Eastern Michigan	9	–	9	.500	15	–	13	.536
Ball State	8	–	10	.444	13	–	16	.448
Western Michigan	7	–	11	.389	12	–	16	.429
Northern Illinois	7	–	11	.389	11	–	16	.407
Bowling Green	6	–	12	.333	12	–	15	.444
Central Michigan	4	–	14	.222	9	–	18	.333
† 1985 MAC tournament winner Rankings from AP Poll

1984–85 MEAC men's basketball standings
	Conf.				Overall
Team	W		L	PCT	W		L	PCT
North Carolina A&T †	10	–	2	.833	19	–	10	.655
Howard	9	–	3	.750	15	–	11	.577
Delaware State	8	–	4	.667	12	–	17	.414
South Carolina State	7	–	4	.636	11	–	16	.407
Bethune–Cookman	4	–	7	.364	8	–	19	.296
Maryland Eastern Shore	2	–	10	.167	3	–	25	.107
Morgan State	1	–	11	.083	3	–	25	.107
† 1985 MEAC tournament winner Rankings from AP Poll

1984–85 Midwestern City Conference men's basketball standings
	Conf.				Overall
Team	W		L	PCT	W		L	PCT
No. 14 Loyola-Chicago†	13	–	1	.929	27	–	6	.818
Butler	9	–	5	.643	19	–	10	.655
Oral Roberts	8	–	6	.571	15	–	15	.500
Detroit	8	–	6	.571	16	–	12	.571
Xavier	7	–	7	.500	16	–	13	.552
Saint Louis	6	–	8	.429	13	–	15	.464
Evansville	4	–	10	.286	13	–	16	.448
Oklahoma City	1	–	13	.071	6	–	20	.231
† 1985 MCC tournament winner

1984–85 Missouri Valley Conference men's basketball standings
	Conf.				Overall
Team	W		L	PCT	W		L	PCT
No. 18 Tulsa	12	–	4	.750	23	–	8	.742
Illinois State	11	–	5	.688	22	–	8	.733
Wichita State †	11	–	5	.688	18	–	13	.581
Bradley	9	–	7	.563	17	–	13	.567
Creighton	9	–	7	.563	20	–	12	.625
Southern Illinois	6	–	10	.375	14	–	14	.500
Indiana State	6	–	10	.375	14	–	15	.483
West Texas State	4	–	12	.250	11	–	17	.393
Drake	4	–	12	.250	12	–	15	.444
† 1985 MVC tournament winner Rankings from AP Poll

1984–85 Ohio Valley Conference men's basketball standings
	Conf.				Overall
Team	W		L	PCT	W		L	PCT
Tennessee Tech	11	–	3	.786	19	–	9	.679
Eastern Kentucky	9	–	5	.643	16	–	13	.552
Youngstown State	9	–	5	.643	19	–	11	.633
Murray State	8	–	6	.571	19	–	9	.679
Middle Tennessee †	7	–	7	.500	17	–	14	.548
Akron	6	–	8	.429	12	–	14	.462
Austin Peay	4	–	10	.286	8	–	19	.296
Morehead State	2	–	12	.143	7	–	20	.259
† 1985 OVC tournament winner Rankings from AP Poll

1984–85 Pacific Coast Athletic Association men's basketball standings
	Conf.				Overall
Team	W		L	PCT	W		L	PCT
No. 9 UNLV†	17	–	1	.944	28	–	4	.875
Fresno State	15	–	3	.833	23	–	9	.719
Cal State Fullerton	11	–	7	.611	17	–	13	.567
Utah State	10	–	8	.556	17	–	11	.607
San Jose State	10	–	8	.556	16	–	13	.552
UC Irvine	8	–	10	.444	12	–	16	.429
UC Santa Barbara	8	–	10	.444	12	–	16	.429
Pacific	5	–	13	.278	9	–	19	.321
New Mexico State	4	–	14	.222	7	–	20	.259
Long Beach State	2	–	16	.111	4	–	23	.148
† 1985 PCAA tournament winner

1984–85 Pacific-10 Conference men's basketball standings
	Conf.				Overall
Team	W		L	PCT	W		L	PCT
Washington	13	–	5	.722	22	–	10	.688
USC	13	–	5	.722	19	–	10	.655
Oregon State	12	–	6	.667	22	–	9	.710
Arizona	12	–	6	.667	21	–	10	.677
UCLA	12	–	6	.667	21	–	12	.636
Oregon	8	–	10	.444	15	–	16	.484
Arizona State	7	–	11	.389	12	–	16	.429
Washington State	5	–	13	.278	13	–	15	.464
California	5	–	13	.278	13	–	15	.464
Stanford	3	–	15	.167	11	–	17	.393
As of November 25, 2011; Rankings from AP Poll

1984–85 Southeastern Conference men's basketball standings
	Conf.				Overall
Team	W		L	PCT	W		L	PCT
No. 20 LSU	13	–	5	.722	19	–	10	.655
No. 19 Georgia	12	–	6	.667	22	–	9	.710
Alabama	11	–	7	.611	23	–	10	.697
Kentucky	11	–	7	.611	18	–	13	.581
Florida	9	–	9	.500	18	–	12	.600
Mississippi State	9	–	9	.500	13	–	15	.464
Tennessee	8	–	10	.444	22	–	15	.595
Auburn †	8	–	10	.444	22	–	12	.647
Ole Miss	5	–	13	.278	11	–	17	.393
Vanderbilt	4	–	14	.222	11	–	17	.393
† 1985 SEC tournament winner Rankings from AP poll

1984–85 Southern Conference men's basketball standings
	Conf.				Overall
Team	W		L	PCT	W		L	PCT
Chattanooga	14	–	2	.875	24	–	8	.750
Marshall†	12	–	4	.750	21	–	13	.618
The Citadel	11	–	5	.688	18	–	11	.621
Western Carolina	8	–	8	.500	14	–	14	.500
VMI	7	–	9	.438	16	–	14	.533
Appalachian State	7	–	9	.438	14	–	14	.500
Davidson	6	–	10	.375	10	–	20	.333
Furman	4	–	12	.250	7	–	21	.250
East Tennessee State	3	–	13	.188	9	–	18	.333
† Tournament winner As of April 30, 1985; Rankings from AP poll

1984–85 Southland Conference men's basketball standings
	Conf.				Overall
Team	W		L	PCT	W		L	PCT
No. 8 Louisiana Tech †	11	–	1	.917	29	–	3	.906
McNeese State	9	–	3	.750	18	–	10	.643
Lamar	8	–	4	.667	20	–	12	.625
Arkansas State	6	–	6	.500	14	–	14	.500
Northeast Louisiana	4	–	8	.333	17	–	12	.586
Texas-Arlington	3	–	9	.250	12	–	16	.429
North Texas	1	–	11	.083	5	–	23	.179
† 1985 Southland tournament winner Rankings from AP poll

1984–85 Southwest Conference men's basketball standings
	Conf.				Overall
Team	W		L	PCT	W		L	PCT
No. 17 Texas Tech †	12	–	4	.750	23	–	8	.742
SMU	10	–	6	.625	23	–	10	.697
Texas A&M	10	–	6	.625	19	–	11	.633
Arkansas	10	–	6	.625	22	–	13	.629
TCU	8	–	8	.500	16	–	12	.571
Houston	8	–	8	.500	16	–	14	.533
Texas	7	–	9	.438	15	–	13	.536
Baylor	4	–	12	.250	11	–	17	.393
Rice	3	–	13	.188	11	–	16	.407
† 1985 SWC tournament winner Rankings from AP Poll

1984–85 SWAC men's basketball standings
	Conf.				Overall
Team	W		L	PCT	W		L	PCT
Alcorn State	13	–	1	.929	23	–	7	.767
Southern †	9	–	5	.643	19	–	11	.633
Mississippi Valley State	7	–	7	.500	18	–	11	.621
Alabama State	7	–	7	.500	14	–	17	.452
Texas Southern	6	–	8	.429	11	–	17	.393
Jackson State	6	–	8	.429	10	–	16	.385
Grambling State	4	–	10	.286	8	–	19	.296
Prairie View A&M	4	–	10	.286	5	–	22	.185
† 1985 SWAC tournament winner Rankings from AP Poll

1984–85 Sun Belt Conference men's basketball standings
	Conf.				Overall
Team	W		L	PCT	W		L	PCT
No. 11 VCU †	12	–	2	.857	26	–	6	.813
UAB	11	–	3	.786	25	–	9	.735
Old Dominion	9	–	5	.643	19	–	12	.613
South Florida	6	–	8	.429	18	–	12	.600
Jacksonville	6	–	8	.429	15	–	14	.517
South Alabama	6	–	8	.429	15	–	13	.536
Western Kentucky	5	–	9	.357	14	–	14	.500
UNC Charlotte	1	–	13	.071	5	–	23	.179
† 1985 Sun Belt Conference tournament winner Rankings from AP Poll

1984–85 Trans America Athletic Conference men's basketball standings
	Conf.				Overall
Team	W		L	PCT	W		L	PCT
Georgia Southern	11	–	3	.786	24	–	5	.828
Houston Baptist	10	–	4	.714	21	–	8	.724
Mercer †	10	–	4	.714	22	–	9	.710
Arkansas–Little Rock	9	–	5	.643	17	–	13	.567
Samford	7	–	7	.500	18	–	12	.600
Hardin–Simmons	7	–	7	.500	11	–	17	.393
Centenary	2	–	12	.143	7	–	21	.250
Georgia State	0	–	14	.000	2	–	26	.071
† 1985 TAAC tournament winner Rankings from AP Poll

1984–85 West Coast Athletic Conference men's basketball standings
	Conf.				Overall
Team	W		L	PCT	W		L	PCT
Pepperdine	11	–	1	.917	23	–	9	.719
Santa Clara	9	–	3	.750	20	–	9	.690
Saint Mary's	7	–	5	.583	15	–	12	.556
San Diego	5	–	7	.417	16	–	11	.593
Gonzaga	4	–	8	.333	15	–	13	.536
Portland	3	–	9	.250	14	–	14	.500
Loyola Marymount	3	–	9	.250	11	–	16	.407
Rankings from AP Poll

1984–85 WAC men's basketball standings
	Conf.				Overall
Team	W		L	PCT	W		L	PCT
UTEP	12	–	4	.750	22	–	10	.688
San Diego State †	11	–	5	.688	23	–	8	.742
New Mexico	9	–	7	.563	19	–	13	.594
Colorado State	9	–	7	.563	18	–	12	.600
BYU	9	–	7	.563	15	–	14	.517
Utah	8	–	8	.500	15	–	16	.484
Wyoming	7	–	9	.438	15	–	14	.517
Hawaii	5	–	11	.313	10	–	18	.357
Air Force	2	–	14	.125	8	–	20	.286
† 1985 WAC tournament winner Rankings from AP Poll

=== Division I independents ===
A total of 22 college teams played as Division I independents. Among them, Notre Dame (21–9) had both the best winning percentage (.700) and the most wins.

1984–85 NCAA Division I men's basketball independents standings
	Conf.				Overall
Team	W		L	PCT	W		L	PCT
Notre Dame		–		–	21	–	9	.700
Dayton		–		–	19	–	10	.655
DePaul		–		–	19	–	10	.655
Marquette		–		–	20	–	11	.645
Texas–San Antonio		–		–	18	–	10	.643
Chicago State		–		–	16	–	11	.593
Radford		–		–	16	–	12	.571
Utica		–		–	15	–	12	.556
Southwestern Louisiana		–		–	17	–	14	.548
Brooklyn		–		–	15	–	13	.536
Baptist		–		–	13	–	15	.464
Eastern Washington		–		–	12	–	15	.444
Monmouth		–		–	12	–	15	.444
Stetson		–		–	12	–	16	.429
Texas–Pan American		–		–	12	–	16	.429
New Orleans		–		–	11	–	19	.367
Florida A&M		–		–	10	–	18	.357
Central Florida		–		–	10	–	18	.357
Tennessee State		–		–	9	–	19	.321
Augusta State		–		–	8	–	20	.286
Campbell		–		–	5	–	22	.185
U.S. International		–		–	1	–	27	.036
Rankings from AP Poll

=== Informal championships ===
Conference	Regular season winner	Most Valuable Player
Philadelphia Big 5	Villanova	Ed Pinckney, Villanova

Villanova finished with a 4–0 record in head-to-head competition among the Philadelphia Big 5.

=== Statistical leaders ===
Points per game			Rebounds per game			Assists per game			Field goal percentage		
Player	School	PPG	Player	School	RPG	Player	School	APG	Player	School	FG%
Xavier McDaniel	Wichita St.	27.2	Xavier McDaniel	Wichita St.	14.8	Robbie Weingard	Hofstra	9.5	Keith Walker	Utica	71.3
Alfredrick Hughes	Loyola (IL)	26.3	Benoit Benjamin	Creighton	14.1	Carl Golston	Loyola (IL)	9.2	Vernon Moore	Creighton	67.4
Dan Palombizio	Ball St.	26.3	Carey Scurry	Long Island	14.1	Jim Les	Bradley	8.8	Dave Hoppen	Nebraska	64.6
Joe Dumars	McNeese St.	25.8	Karl Towns	Monmouth	12.3	Taurence Chisholm	Delaware	8.0	David Robinson	Navy	64.4
Terry Catledge	S. Alabama	25.6	Robert Sanders	Miss. Valley St.	11.9	Brian Carr	Nebraska	7.9	John Staves	Southern	63.8
Derrick Gervin	UTSA	25.6									

Free throw percentage
Player	School	FT%
Craig Collins	Penn St.	95.9
Steve Alford	Indiana	92.1
Steve Eggink	Marist	92.0
Dennis Nutt	TCU	91.7
Bruce Timko	Youngstown St.	90.7

== Postseason tournaments ==
=== NCAA tournament ===
==== Final Four - Rupp Arena, Lexington, Kentucky ====
National semifinals
E1	Georgetown	77
W1	St John's	59
S8	Villanova	52
M2	Memphis State	45

National championship game
E1	Georgetown	64
S8	Villanova	66

=== National Invitation tournament ===
==== NIT Semifinals and Final ====
Semifinals (March 27)
Tennessee	67
Indiana	74
UCLA	75
Louisville	66

Finals (March 29)
Indiana	62
UCLA	65

Third place game
Tennessee	100
Louisville	84

== Award winners ==
=== Consensus All-American teams ===
Consensus First Team
Player	Position	Class	Team
Johnny Dawkins	G	Junior	Duke
Patrick Ewing	C	Senior	Georgetown
Keith Lee	F/C	Senior	Memphis State
Xavier McDaniel	F	Senior	Wichita State
Chris Mullin	F	Senior	St. John's
Wayman Tisdale	F	Senior	Oklahoma

Consensus Second Team
Player	Position	Class	Team
Len Bias	F	Junior	Maryland
Jon Koncak	C	Senior	Southern Methodist
Mark Price	G	Junior	Georgia Tech
Kenny Walker	F	Junior	Kentucky
Dwayne Washington	G	Sophomore	Syracuse

=== Major player of the year awards ===
- Wooden Award: Chris Mullin, St. John's
- Naismith Award: Patrick Ewing, Georgetown
- Associated Press Player of the Year: Patrick Ewing, Georgetown
- UPI Player of the Year: Chris Mullin, St. John's
- NABC Player of the Year: Patrick Ewing, Georgetown
- Oscar Robertson Trophy (USBWA): Chris Mullin, St. John's
- Adolph Rupp Trophy: Chris Mullin, St. John's
- Sporting News Player of the Year: Patrick Ewing, Georgetown

=== Major coach of the year awards ===
- Associated Press Coach of the Year: Bill Frieder, Michigan
- UPI Coach of the Year: Lou Carnesecca, St. John's
- Henry Iba Award (USBWA): Lou Carnesecca, St. John's
- NABC Coach of the Year: John Thompson, Georgetown
- CBS/Chevrolet Coach of the Year: Dale Brown, LSU
- Sporting News Coach of the Year: Lou Carnesecca, St. John's

=== Other major awards ===
- Frances Pomeroy Naismith Award (Best player under 6'0): Bubba Jennings, Texas Tech
- Robert V. Geasey Trophy (Top player in Philadelphia Big 5): Ed Pinckney, Villanova
- NIT/Haggerty Award (Top player in New York City metro area): Chris Mullin, St. John's (3-time recipient)

== Coaching changes ==
A number of teams changed coaches during the season and after it ended.

Team	Former Coach	Interim Coach	New Coach	Reason
Arizona State	Bob Weinhauer		Steve Patterson	
Arkansas	Eddie Sutton		Nolan Richardson	Sutton left to coach Kentucky.
Austin Peay	Howard Jackson		Lake Kelly	
Baylor	Jim Haller		Gene Iba	
Boston University	John Kuester		Mike Jaris	Kuester left to coch George Washington.
California	Dick Kuchen		Lou Campanelli	
Campbell	Jerry Smith		Billy Lee	
Central Florida	Chuck Machock		Phil Carter	
Central Michigan	Dick Parfitt		Charlie Coles	
The Citadel	Les Robinson		Randy Nesbit	Robinson left to coach East Tennessee State.
Creighton	Willis Reed		Tony Barone	
Delaware	Ronald Rainey		Steve Steinwedel	Steinwedel was hired from the South Carolina coaching staff.
Delaware State	Joe Dean Davidson		Marshall Emery	
East Tennessee State	Barry Dowd		Les Robinson	
Eastern Michigan	Jim Boyce		Ben Braun	
Eastern Washington	Jerry Krause		Joe Folda	
Evansville	Dick Walters		Jim Crews	Crews was hired from the Indiana coaching staff.
Fairfield	Terry O'Connor		Mitch Buonaguro	
Furman	Jene Davis		Butch Estes	
George Washington	Gerry Gimelstob		John Kuester	
Georgia State	Tom Pugliese	Mark Slonaker	Bob Reinhart	Reinhart was hired from the Atlanta Hawks coaching staff.
Gonzaga	Jay Hillock		Dan Fitzgerald	
Harvard	Frank McLaughlin		Peter Roby	
Hawaii	Larry Little		Frank Arnold	
Houston Baptist	Gene Iba		Tommy Jones	Iba left to coach Baylor.
Idaho State	Wayne Ballard		Jim Boutin	
Indiana State	Dave Schellhase		Ron Greene	Greene was hired from Murray State.
James Madison	Lou Campanelli		John Thurston	
Kentucky	Joe B. Hall		Eddie Sutton	
Lehigh	Tom Schneider		Fran McCaffery	Schneider left to coach Penn. McCaffery was promoted from assistant to head coach.
Louisiana Tech	Andy Russo		Tommy Joe Eagles	
Loyola Marymount	Ed Goorjian		Paul Westhead	
Manhattan	Gordon Chiesa		Tom Sullivan	
Morgan State	Nathaniel McMillan	Tom Dean	Nat Frazier	
Murray State	Ron Greene		Steve Newton	Greene left to coach Indiana State. Newton was promoted from assistant to head coach.
New Mexico State	Weldon Drew		Neil McCarthy	Drew left to join the coaching staff of Oklahoma State.
New Orleans	Don Smith		Benny Dees	
Niagara	Pte Lonergan		Andy Walker	
Northwestern State	Wayne Yates		Don Beasley	
Old Dominion	Paul Webb		Tom Young	
Oral Roberts	Dick Acres		Ted Owens	
Penn	Craig Littlepage		Tom Schneider	Littlepage left to coach Rutgers. Schneider hired from Lehigh.
Providence	Joe Mullaney		Rick Pitino	
Rutgers	Tom Young		Craig Littlepage	Young left to coach Old Dominion.
Seattle	Len Nardone		Bob Johnson	John was hired from the Washington coaching staff.
Southern Illinois	Allen Van Winkle		Rich Herrin	
Tennessee–Chattanooga	Murray Arnold		Mack McCarthy	Arnold left to join the Chicago Bulls coaching staff. McCarthy was hired from the Auburn coaching staff.
Tennessee State	Edward Martin	Ed Myers	Larry Reid	Martin was relieved of his duties after 9 games. Myers took over the remainder of the season.
Tulsa	Nolan Richardson		J. D. Barnett	Richardson left to coach Arkansas.
UNC Charlotte	Hal Wissel		Jeff Mullins	
US International	Freddie Goss		Gary Zarecky	
VCU	J. D. Barnett		Mike Pollio	
Wake Forest	Carl Tacy		Bob Staak	
Washington	Marv Harshman		Andy Russo	
Weber State	Neil McCarthy		Larry Farmer	McCarthy left to coach New Mexico State.
Wisconsin–Green Bay	Dick Lien		Dick Bennett	
Xavier	Bob Staak		Pete Gillen	
