= 1985 NCAA Division I men's basketball championship game =

American college basketball final

1985 NCAA Tournament Championship Game
National championship game
Villanova Wildcats	Georgetown Hoyas
Big East	Big East
(24–10)	(35–2)
66	64
Head coach: Rollie Massimino	Head coach: John Thompson
- AP: NR
- Coaches: NR
- AP: 1
- Coaches: 1
	1st half	2nd half	Total
Villanova Wildcats	29	37	66
Georgetown Hoyas	28	36	64
- Date: April 1, 1985
- Venue: Rupp Arena, Lexington, Kentucky
- MVP: Ed Pinckney, Villanova
- Favorite: Georgetown by 9.5
- Referees: John Clougherty, Bobby Dibbler, Don Rutledge
- Attendance: 23,124

United States TV coverage
- Network: CBS
- Announcers: Brent Musburger and Billy Packer

The 1985 NCAA Division I men's basketball championship game was the final of the 1985 NCAA Division I men's basketball tournament and determined the national champion in the 1984–85 NCAA Division I men's basketball season. The game was held on April 1, 1985, at Rupp Arena in Lexington, Kentucky. The Georgetown Hoyas, the defending national champions and the tournament's number one seed from the East region, faced the Villanova Wildcats, the eighth seed from the Southeast region. The teams came from the same conference, the Big East, and the championship game was the third meeting between them in 1984–85, after two regular season contests.

Villanova defeated Georgetown by a score of 66–64 to win their first-ever national championship, in what is considered by analysts to be one of the biggest upsets in tournament history. The Wildcats had the highest field goal percentage in Final Four history, winning their first national championship in men's basketball. The game is referred to as the "Perfect Game", as the Wildcats shot 78.6 percent as a team for the game (22 for 28, including 9 for 10 in the second half).

== Background ==
=== Georgetown Hoyas ===
The Hoyas entered the 1984–85 season as the defending national champion, having won the title in 1984. Coached by John Thompson, the Hoyas featured center Patrick Ewing, who was named to the 1985 All-American team. The Hoyas held the number one ranking in the Associated Press Poll at the start of the season, and won their first 14 games against Division I clubs. The team alternated the position with fellow Big East team St. John's. Georgetown lost only two games in the regular season, consecutive matchups with St. John's and Syracuse, before an 11-game winning streak prior to the NCAA Tournament that included a Big East Tournament championship. After losing their number one ranking after their pair of losses, Georgetown regained the position in the March 5 rankings and held it at the end of the regular season. The team was thought of at the time as one of the best college clubs in years. Their wins included a pair over Villanova in conference play. In the first game, held at the Spectrum in Philadelphia, Villanova's home arena, the teams battled into overtime before the Hoyas claimed a two-point victory. The repeat contest, in Washington, D.C., was also closely contested, but Georgetown again prevailed, 57–50.

Georgetown received the top seed in the East regional bracket of the 1985 NCAA Tournament, the first with 64 teams in the field, and faced Lehigh in the first round. A 68–43 victory set up a second-round matchup with eighth-seeded Temple, which the Hoyas won 63–46 to advance to the regional semifinals. There, Georgetown was matched with number four seed Loyola University Chicago; the Hoyas prevailed by 12 points and moved on to the East region's final. Against Georgia Tech, the Hoyas played in their closest game of the tournament to that point, winning 60–54 to advance to the Final Four. In an all-Big East game, Georgetown defeated St. John's 77–59, behind 20 points by Reggie Williams and 16 by Ewing, to clinch a spot in the national championship game.

=== Villanova Wildcats ===
Coached by Rollie Massimino, the Wildcats were coming off of a season in which they had lost to Illinois in the second round of the 1984 NCAA Tournament. The team's regular starting lineup included seniors Ed Pinckney, Dwayne McClain, and Gary McLain, along with juniors Harold Pressley and Dwight Wilbur. Villanova began the season 13–3, before a January 1985 loss at Maryland. The defeat started a slump that lasted throughout the rest of the regular season; the Wildcats had a 5–5 record in their final 10 regular season games, capped by a 23-point loss at Pittsburgh. After peaking at number 14 in the January 22 rankings, the team fell out of the Associated Press Poll by mid-February. With an 18–9 record overall entering the 1985 Big East men's basketball tournament, Villanova was not assured of receiving an invitation to the NCAA Tournament. In a rematch against Pittsburgh, the team won by eight points to effectively secure their tournament berth. In the semifinals of the Big East Tournament, the Wildcats suffered a 15-point loss to St. John's, leaving their record at 19–10 going into the NCAA Tournament.

The Wildcats received the Southeast regional bracket's eighth seed and were matched in the first round against ninth-seeded Dayton, with the game held in Dayton's home arena. Despite the disadvantage of playing in what amounted to a road game, Villanova advanced after a closely contested contest; a go-ahead layup by Pressley gave the Wildcats a late lead that they held until the end. The Wildcats then won their second-round game, 59–55, over the region's top seed, Michigan, before a 46–43 victory in a rematch against Maryland (the fifth seed) that sent them to the regional final. North Carolina, their opponent, held a five-point lead at halftime before a strong performance in the second half led to a 12-point Villanova win and a spot in the Final Four. In their game against Memphis State, the Wildcats won by a 52–45 final score to gain their title game berth.

== Starting lineups ==
Villanova	Position	Georgetown
Dwight Wilbur	G	Michael Jackson
Gary McLain	G	David Wingate
Harold Pressley	F	Bill Martin
Dwayne McClain	F	Reggie Williams
Ed Pinckney	C	† Patrick Ewing
† 1985 Consensus First Team All-American

== Game summary ==
The game was played at Rupp Arena, in front of a crowd of 23,124 spectators. Georgetown was listed as a nine-point favorite entering the contest. The Wildcats opened the scoring early in the first half. After Villanova narrowly avoided a turnover twice, Ed Pinckney passed the ball to Harold Pressley; under pressure from Ewing on defense, Pressley scored on a reverse layup to give the Wildcats a 2–0 lead. The Hoyas' David Wingate evened the score with a successful jump shot. The teams then traded baskets; a slam dunk by McClain was followed by another jump shot by Wingate. Villanova made their first four field goal attempts, but fell behind 10–8 as they committed four turnovers during the period. Georgetown played a 1–3–1 defense focused on trapping and pressuring the Wildcats' players, while Villanova used a match-up zone defense. With about 16 minutes elapsed in the first half, the Hoyas held a one-point advantage. Ewing responded by scoring on dunks on each of Georgetown's following three possessions. The Hoyas were unable to extend their lead, however, because Villanova found success on long field goal attempts. Three Wildcats players scored on long-range jumpers, including a shot by Pressley that fell after hitting the rim multiple times. The Wildcats employed a "patient" offensive strategy during the game, which was in evidence during the last two minutes of the first half as Pinckney, with two personal fouls, was not on the floor. The team employed what author Frank Fitzpatrick called "the last successful stall in college basketball history."

After obtaining ball possession with 1:58 left, the Wildcats went into a four corners offense and held the ball until the closing seconds of the half, a tactic that was legal because a shot clock was not instituted in college basketball until the 1985–86 season. Georgetown was playing a 1–3–1 zone defense, allowing the Wildcats to execute their strategy. In one of four times during the game that Villanova maintained possession for over 45 seconds, Pressley made a shot to put his team up 29–28. A long-distance shot by Wingate missed as time ran out in the first half, and the arm of Georgetown forward Williams made contact with the face and neck of Villanova reserve Chuck Everson; no foul was called, but Villanova assistant coach Marty Marback credited the encounter with giving his team energy going into the halftime break.

After an opening period that announcer Brent Musburger called "as good a half of college basketball as I've ever seen," the second half began with a successful jump shot by Ewing; Thompson had told the Hoyas to feature him in their offense. The Wildcats reclaimed the lead on a field goal by Harold Jensen, his third of the game, before Pinckney made a shot while being fouled by Ewing. His ensuing free throw attempt was good, and Villanova extended their lead to 34–30. The play began a stretch of about a minute in which Ewing committed three personal fouls and had to be removed from the Hoyas lineup; with Williams suffering from an ankle injury, Georgetown's two leading players on offense were out of the game. The Wildcats began taking more time on their possessions, and took a 38–32 advantage in the first four minutes of the half. Ewing re-entered the game, but Villanova maintained their lead; three points by McClain brought the score to 41–36. McLain was injured while running into Hoyas player Horace Broadnax and was temporarily forced to the bench. With 10 minutes left in regulation, the Wildcats held a one-point lead, even though they had attempted only five field goals so far in the second half. Over the next few minutes of play, Villanova went up 53–48; after a field goal by Pinckney, the Hoyas called a timeout. The closing six minutes started with a Georgetown scoring run; the Hoyas took a 54–53 lead and gained ball possession off of a turnover by Villanova with about four minutes left.

At this time, the Hoyas borrowed a page from Villanova's offensive strategy and started running the four corners offense, with the hopes of causing the Wildcats to abandon their regular defense and shift to man-to-man coverage. The team's plan was foiled when a pass by Bill Martin deflected out of bounds off the shin of Broadnax. Under 30 seconds had gone off the clock when the Wildcats regained the ball. Villanova resumed their ball-control offense, and took the lead with 2:37 remaining on a made shot by Jensen; the Wildcats had taken 62 seconds to run the play. Jensen's shot was the last attempted by Villanova in the game; all of the team's remaining points came on free throws. The Wildcats scored the next four points and were up 59–54 going into the final 84 seconds. Although the team was unsuccessful on multiple one-and-one free throw attempts, they added seven more points in the final portion of the game. The last made free throw, on the second of two attempts by Pressley, gave the Wildcats a 66–62 advantage with approximately 10 seconds on the clock. A shot by Michael Jackson brought the Hoyas to within two points in the closing seconds. Wingate stopped the clock from expiring by hitting the ball out of play with two seconds left. Jensen inbounded the ball to McClain, who had gone to the floor, and McClain kept possession until time expired and the Wildcats won the game and the Division I national championship, 66–64.

== Statistical summary ==
The top scorer in the game was McClain, who had 17 points; just behind him on the Wildcats was Pinckney, who had a 16-point performance. Jensen had a perfect shooting night, going 5-for-5 and finishing with 14 points. The Hoyas' leading scorer was Wingate, who posted 17 points. Ewing had 14 points in the game, but was both out-scored and outrebounded by the Wildcats' Pinckney; he had five rebounds, one fewer than Pinckney. Martin had 10 points in the game and matched Ewing's total of five rebounds. The top assist provider for either team was Georgetown's Jackson, who had nine assists and added eight points.

The Wildcats were successful on 22 of 28 field goal attempts in the game, for a shooting percentage of 78.6 percent. The team made all but one of their 10 shot attempts in the second half. The Wildcats set NCAA Tournament championship game records for the highest shooting percentage and the fewest shot attempts; both figures are also records for any Final Four game as of 2019. Villanova made most of their free throw attempts, converting on 22 of 27 attempts. Georgetown made more than 50 percent of their shots as well, with 54 percent shooting (29 for 53). The Hoyas had 19 fewer free throw attempts than Villanova, although they were successful on six of their eight tries. The Wildcats committed 12 fouls in the game, and held Ewing without a free throw attempt. Georgetown had 11 turnovers in the contest, six fewer than the 17 by Villanova; that total included six by Jensen. Sportswriter Tim Layden commented on the Wildcats' statistics, "Part of what is so fascinating about the game is that Villanova, when it did not turn the ball over, almost always scored." Each team had 17 rebounds, the fewest in any Final Four contest as of 2019.

== Aftermath and legacy ==
A rule change in college basketball left teams unable to replicate Villanova's ball control strategy from the 1985 national championship game. After several conferences used a shot clock during the previous few seasons, the NCAA instituted a 45-second clock for the 1985–86 season. The clock was reduced to 35 seconds in 1993–94 and 30 in 2015–16.

The Wildcats lost multiple assistant coaches to other college positions in the years following the 1985 NCAA championship game. In the seven seasons Massimino spent as head coach at Villanova before leaving the program after the 1991–92 season, the team made it to the regional semifinals of the NCAA Tournament only once. The Wildcats did not return to the Final Four until 2009, and did not reach the championship game again until 2016, when they defeated North Carolina to end a 31-year championship drought. Villanova added a third championship two years later against Michigan.

The 1985–86 Georgetown team had an overall record of 24–8, and were eliminated in the second round of the 1986 NCAA Tournament by Michigan State. Georgetown's lone Final Four appearance since 1985 came in 2007, when they lost to Ohio State. The Hoyas were coached by Thompson's son, John Thompson III during their 2007 Final Four run.

The 1985 NCAA Tournament championship has been described as one of the biggest upsets in the tournament's history by numerous writers, including Jack Carey of USA Today and Matt Bonesteel of The Washington Post. As of 2025, the 1984–85 Villanova team is the lowest-seeded NCAA championship squad.

== Bibliography ==
- Fitzpatrick, Frank (2013). The Perfect Game: How Villanova's Shocking 1985 Upset of Mighty Georgetown Changed the Landscape of College Hoops Forever. Macmillan Publishers. ISBN 9781250009531.
