= 1984–85 Wichita State Shockers men's basketball team =

American college basketball season

1984–85 Wichita State Shockers men's basketball

MVC tournament champions

NCAA tournament
- Conference: Missouri Valley Conference
- Record: 18–13 (11–5 MVC)
- Head coach: Gene Smithson (7th season)
- Home arena: Levitt Arena (10,506)

1984–85 Missouri Valley Conference men's basketball standings
	Conf.				Overall
Team	W		L	PCT	W		L	PCT
No. 18 Tulsa	12	–	4	.750	23	–	8	.742
Illinois State	11	–	5	.688	22	–	8	.733
Wichita State †	11	–	5	.688	18	–	13	.581
Bradley	9	–	7	.563	17	–	13	.567
Creighton	9	–	7	.563	20	–	12	.625
Southern Illinois	6	–	10	.375	14	–	14	.500
Indiana State	6	–	10	.375	14	–	15	.483
West Texas State	4	–	12	.250	11	–	17	.393
Drake	4	–	12	.250	12	–	15	.444
† 1985 MVC tournament winner Rankings from AP Poll

The 1984–85 Wichita State Shockers men's basketball team represented Wichita State University in the 1984–85 NCAA Division I men's basketball season. They played their home games at the Levitt Arena. They were in their 40th season as a member of the Missouri Valley Conference and 79th season overall. They were led by head coach Gene Smithson in his 7th season at the school. They finished the season 18–13, 11–5 in Missouri Valley play to finish in second place. They won the MVC tournament to receive an automatic bid to the 1985 NCAA tournament. As the No. 11 seed in the East region, the Shockers lost in the opening round to Georgia, 67–59.

Senior power forward Xavier McDaniel capped one of the greatest careers in program history. McDaniel established single-season school records for points and rebounds, and became the first player to lead the nation in scoring and rebounding in the same season. He was named MVC Player of the Year and a Consensus First-team All-American. McDaniel was taken by the Seattle SuperSonics with the 4th pick in the 1985 NBA draft.

== Roster ==
1984–85 Wichita State Shockers men's basketball team
Players
Coaches

Pos.	#	Name	Height	Weight	Year	Hometown
G	22	Aubrey Sherrod	6 ft 4 in (1.93 m)	—	Sr	Wichita, Kansas
F	34	Xavier McDaniel	6 ft 7 in (2.01 m)	210 lb (95 kg)	Sr	Columbia, South Carolina
F/C	53	Henry Carr	6 ft 9 in (2.06 m)	—	So	Wichita, Kansas

Head coach

- Gene Smithson

Assistant coach(es)

Legend

- (C) Team captain
- (S) Suspended
- (I) Ineligible
- (W) Walk-on
- Injured
- Current redshirt

== Schedule and results ==
Date time, TV	Rank^{#}	Opponent^{#}	Result	Record	Site (attendance) city, state
Regular season
Nov 24, 1984*		at Lamar	W 70–65	1–0	Montagne Center (7,725); Beaumont, Texas
Nov 26, 1984*		Chicago State	L 49–60	1–1	Levitt Arena; Wichita, Kansas
Dec 1, 1984*		Pepperdine	L 81–83	1–2	Levitt Arena; Wichita, Kansas
Dec 3, 1984*		Oregon	W 63–58	2–2	Levitt Arena; Wichita, Kansas
Dec 7, 1984*		Ohio	L 55–56	2–3	Levitt Arena; Wichita, Kansas
Dec 8, 1984*		McNeese State	L 56–60	2–4	Levitt Arena; Wichita, Kansas
Dec 15, 1984*		Nebraska–Omaha	W 70–43	3–4	Levitt Arena; Wichita, Kansas
Dec 20, 1984*		vs. No. 10 North Carolina; Suntory Ball Tournament	L 69–80	3–5	Osaka, Japan
Dec 21, 1984*		vs. Arizona State; Suntory Ball Tournament	L 69–76	3–6	Tokyo, Japan
Dec 29, 1984*		Hartford	W 97–66	4–6	Levitt Arena; Wichita, Kansas
Jan 3, 1985		West Texas A&M	W 98–64	5–6 (1–0)	Levitt Arena; Wichita, Kansas
Jan 5, 1985*		vs. No. 11 Kansas	L 83–90	5–7	Kemper Arena; Kansas City, Missouri
Jan 10, 1985		at Bradley	W 82–79	6–7 (2–0)	Carver Arena; Peoria, Illinois
Jan 12, 1985		at Illinois State	L 80–86	6–8 (2–1)	Horton Field House; Normal, Illinois
Jan 17, 1985		Indiana State	W 84–80	7–8 (3–1)	Levitt Arena; Wichita, Kansas
Jan 19, 1985		Drake	W 81–65	8–8 (4–1)	Levitt Arena; Wichita, Kansas
Jan 24, 1985		Creighton	W 82–81	9–8 (5–1)	Levitt Arena; Wichita, Kansas
Jan 26, 1985		at West Texas A&M	W 99–86	10–8 (6–1)	WT Fieldhouse; Canyon, Texas
Jan 31, 1985		at Indiana State	W 88–72	11–8 (7–1)	Hulman Center; Terre Haute, Indiana
Feb 2, 1985		at Southern Illinois	W 92–76	12–8 (8–1)	SIU Arena; Carbondale, Illinois
Feb 7, 1985		Southern Illinois	W 80–56	13–8 (9–1)	Levitt Arena; Wichita, Kansas
Feb 9, 1985		No. 17 Tulsa; Rivalry	L 75–87	13–9 (9–2)	Levitt Arena; Wichita, Kansas
Feb 14, 1985		at Creighton	L 64–72	13–10 (9–3)	Omaha Civic Auditorium; Omaha, Nebraska
Feb 16, 1985		Illinois State	L 58–64	13–11 (9–4)	Levitt Arena; Wichita, Kansas
Feb 18, 1985		at Drake	W 95–77	14–11 (10–4)	Veterans Memorial Auditorium; Des Moines, Iowa
Feb 23, 1985		Bradley	W 75–65	15–11 (11–4)	Levitt Arena; Wichita, Kansas
Mar 2, 1985		at No. 15 Tulsa; Rivalry	L 66–67	15–12 (11–5)	Tulsa Convention Center; Tulsa, Oklahoma
MVC Tournament
Mar 5, 1985*		Southern Illinois; Quarterfinals	W 69–66	16–12	Levitt Arena; Wichita, Kansas
Mar 6, 1985*		Indiana State; Semifinals	W 92–65	17–12	Levitt Arena; Wichita, Kansas
Mar 7, 1985*		at No. 15 Tulsa; Championship game	W 84–82	18–12	Tulsa Convention Center; Tulsa, Oklahoma
NCAA tournament
Mar 15, 1985*	(11 E)	vs. (6 E) No. 19 Georgia; First round	L 59–67	18–13	The Omni; Atlanta, Georgia
*Non-conference game. ^{#}Rankings from AP poll. (#) Tournament seedings in parentheses. E=East. All times are in Central Time.

== Awards and honors ==
- Xavier McDaniel – Consensus First-Team All-American, MVC Player of the Year, First player to lead the nation in scoring (27.2) and rebounding (14.8) in the same season, single-season school records for scoring and rebounding, school record for career rebounds

== NBA draft ==
Round	Pick	Player	NBA club
1	4	Xavier McDaniel	Seattle SuperSonics
2	34	Aubrey Sherrod	Chicago Bulls
