= 1984–85 Creighton Bluejays men's basketball team =

American college basketball season

1984–85 Creighton Bluejays men's basketball
- Conference: Missouri Valley Conference
- Record: 20–12 (9–7 MVC)
- Head coach: Willis Reed
- Home arena: Omaha Civic Auditorium

1984–85 Missouri Valley Conference men's basketball standings
	Conf.				Overall
Team	W		L	PCT	W		L	PCT
No. 18 Tulsa	12	–	4	.750	23	–	8	.742
Illinois State	11	–	5	.688	22	–	8	.733
Wichita State †	11	–	5	.688	18	–	13	.581
Bradley	9	–	7	.563	17	–	13	.567
Creighton	9	–	7	.563	20	–	12	.625
Southern Illinois	6	–	10	.375	14	–	14	.500
Indiana State	6	–	10	.375	14	–	15	.483
West Texas State	4	–	12	.250	11	–	17	.393
Drake	4	–	12	.250	12	–	15	.444
† 1985 MVC tournament winner Rankings from AP Poll

The 1984–85 Creighton Bluejays men's basketball team represented the Creighton University during the 1984–85 NCAA Division I men's basketball season.

== Roster ==
1984–85 Creighton Bluejays men's basketball team
Players
Coaches

Pos.	#	Name	Height	Weight	Year	Hometown
F	40	Landreth Baugh	6 ft 8 in (2.03 m)	200 lb (91 kg)	So	Chicago, Illinois
C	00	Benoit Benjamin	7 ft 0 in (2.13 m)	235 lb (107 kg)	Sr	Monroe, Louisiana
G	10	Renard Edwards	5 ft 10 in (1.78 m)	175 lb (79 kg)	So	Chicago, Illinois
G	20	Rich Goldberg	6 ft 3 in (1.91 m)	180 lb (82 kg)	Fr	West Bloomfield, Michigan
F	44	Karlas Gripado	6 ft 6 in (1.98 m)	190 lb (86 kg)	So	Owasso, Oklahoma
C	51	Dwight Johnson	6 ft 10 in (2.08 m)	255 lb (116 kg)	So	Dallas, Texas
F	25	Ed Johansen	6 ft 8 in (2.03 m)	210 lb (95 kg)	Fr	Papillion, Nebraska
G	22	Vernon Moore	6 ft 2 in (1.88 m)	190 lb (86 kg)	Sr	New York, New York
G	32	Reggie Morris	6 ft 3 in (1.91 m)	170 lb (77 kg)	Jr	Tupelo, Mississippi
F	34	Ed Stefaniak	6 ft 6 in (1.98 m)	195 lb (88 kg)	Fr	Round Lake, Illinois
G	21	Gary Swain	6 ft 4 in (1.93 m)	185 lb (84 kg)	So	Dallas, Texas
F	42	Bill Wirskye	6 ft 8 in (2.03 m)	220 lb (100 kg)	Fr	Ft. Worth, Texas
G	23	Wyville Wood	6 ft 4 in (1.93 m)	180 lb (82 kg)	Jr	Louisville, Kentucky

Head coach

- Willis Reed

Assistant coach(es)

- Ron Boone
- Rick Collura
- Gene Haynes
- George Morrow

Legend

- (C) Team captain
- (S) Suspended
- (I) Ineligible
- (W) Walk-on
- Injured
- Current redshirt

Roster

== Schedule ==
Date time, TV	Rank^{#}	Opponent^{#}	Result	Record	Site city, state
November 24*		Nebraska-Kearney	W 103–95	1–0	Omaha Civic Auditorium; Omaha, Nebraska
November 27*		at Nebraska-Omaha	W 76–66	2–0	Sapp Fieldhouse; Omaha, Nebraska
December 1*		at Iowa State	L 68–77	2–1	Hilton Coliseum; Ames, Iowa
December 4*		Briar Cliff	W 91–67	3–1	Omaha Civic Auditorium; Omaha, Nebraska
December 8*		Nebraska; Rivalry	L 73–78	3–2	Omaha Civic Auditorium; Omaha, Nebraska
December 14*		Regis	W 71–51	4–2	Omaha Civic Auditorium; Omaha, Nebraska
December 16*		at Hawaii-Hilo	W 76–71	5–2	
December 18*		at Hawaii	W 79–77	6–2	Neal S. Blaisdell Center; Honolulu, Hawaii
December 19*		at Chaminade	W 79–68	7–2	
December 20*		at BYU-Hawaii	W 77–69	8–2	
December 27*		at No. 9 DePaul	L 58–87	8–3	Rosemont Horizon; Rosemont, Illinois
December 30*		Notre Dame	W 60–58	9–3	Omaha Civic Auditorium; Omaha, Nebraska
January 2		Bradley	L 72–76	9–4 (0–1)	Omaha Civic Auditorium; Omaha, Nebraska
January 5		Illinois State	W 73–63	10–4 (1–1)	Omaha Civic Auditorium; Omaha, Nebraska
January 7*		Southern	W 87–82	11–4 (1–1)	Omaha Civic Auditorium; Omaha, Nebraska
January 10		at West Texas State	W 68–61	12–4 (2–1)	Canyon, Texas
January 12		at Tulsa	L 66–70	12–5 (2–2)	Tulsa Convention Center; Tulsa, Oklahoma
January 17		Southern Illinois	W 96–90	13–5 (3–2)	Omaha Civic Auditorium; Omaha, Nebraska
January 19		Indiana State	W 115–80	14–5 (4–2)	Omaha Civic Auditorium (7,571); Omaha, Nebraska
January 23		at Wichita State	L 82–91	14–6 (4–3)	Levitt Arena; Wichita, Kansas
January 27*		Marquette	W 71–59	15–6 (4–3)	Omaha Civic Auditorium (8,165); Omaha, Nebraska
February 2		at Bradley	W 71–68	16–6 (5–3)	Carver Arena; Peoria, Illinois
February 4		West Texas State	W 87–63	17–6 (6–3)	Omaha Civic Auditorium; Omaha, Nebraska
February 7		Drake	W 58–56	18–6 (7–3)	Omaha Civic Auditorium; Omaha, Nebraska
February 9		at Indiana State	W 82–77	19–6 (8–3)	Hulman Center; Terre Haute, Indiana
February 14		Wichita State	W 72–64	20–6 (9–3)	Omaha Civic Auditorium; Omaha, Nebraska
February 16		No. 15 Tulsa	L 63–78	20–7 (9–4)	Omaha Civic Auditorium; Omaha, Nebraska
February 20		at Southern Illinois	L 70–83	20–8 (9–5)	SIU Arena; Carbondale, Illinois
February 23		at Illinois State	L 61–89	20–9 (9–6)	Horton Field House; Normal, Illinois
February 26		at Drake	L 54–103	20–10 (9–7)	Veterans Memorial Auditorium; Des Moines, Iowa
February 28*		at Dayton	L 62–67	20–11 (9–7)	University of Dayton Arena; Dayton, Ohio
March 5		at Bradley; MVC Quarterfinals	L 59–66	20–12 (9–7)	Carver Arena; Peoria, Illinois
*Non-conference game. ^{#}Rankings from AP Poll. (#) Tournament seedings in parentheses.
