= 1984–85 Boise State Broncos men's basketball team =

American college basketball season

1984–85 Boise State Broncos men's basketball
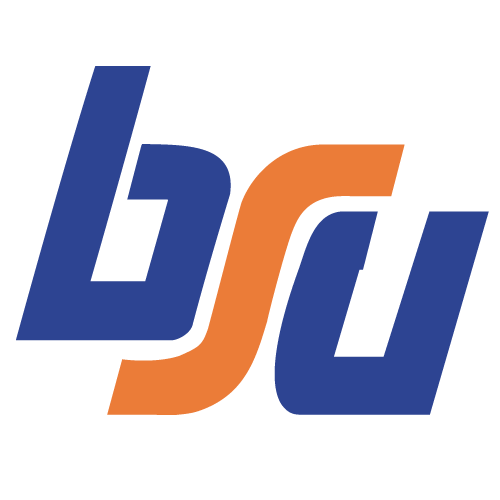
- Conference: Big Sky Conference
- Record: 16–13 (5–9 Big Sky)
- Head coach: Bobby Dye (2nd season)
- Assistant coach: Rod Jensen
- Home arena: BSU Pavilion

1984–85 Big Sky men's basketball standings
	Conf.				Overall
Team	W		L	PCT	W		L	PCT
Nevada †	11	–	3	.786	21	–	10	.677
Montana	10	–	4	.714	22	–	7	.759
Weber State	9	–	5	.643	20	–	9	.690
Northern Arizona	8	–	6	.571	17	–	12	.586
Montana State	7	–	7	.500	11	–	17	.393
Boise State	5	–	9	.357	16	–	13	.552
Idaho State	5	–	9	.357	15	–	18	.455
Idaho	1	–	13	.071	8	–	22	.267
† 1985 Big Sky tournament winner

The 1984–85 Boise State Broncos men's basketball team represented Boise State University during the 1984–85 NCAA Division I men's basketball season. The Broncos were led by second-year head coach Bobby Dye and played their home games on campus at the BSU Pavilion in Boise, Idaho.

They finished the regular season at 15–12 overall, with a 5–9 record in the Big Sky Conference, tied for sixth in the standings. In the conference tournament at home in Boise, the seventh-seeded Broncos upset second seed Montana by thirteen points in the last quarterfinal. In the semifinal, Boise State lost by three points to sixth-seeded Idaho State.

This was the tenth year of the Big Sky tourney, and the first time that BSU had hosted; the first eight editions were four-team events, hosted by the regular season champion. The Broncos won the first in 1976.

== Postseason results ==
Date time, TV	Rank^{#}	Opponent^{#}	Result	Record	Site (attendance) city, state
Big Sky tournament
Thu, March 7; 9:30 pm	(7)	(2) Montana; Quarterfinal	W 67–54	16–12	BSU Pavilion; Boise, Idaho
Fri, March 8	(7)	(6) Idaho State; Semifinal	L 86–89	16–13	BSU Pavilion (9,153); Boise, Idaho
*Non-conference game. ^{#}Rankings from AP poll. (#) Tournament seedings in parentheses. All times are in Mountain time.
