= 1984–85 Indiana State Sycamores men's basketball team =

American college basketball season

1984–85 Indiana State Sycamores men's basketball
- Conference: Missouri Valley Conference
- Record: 14–15 (6–10 MVC)
- Head coach: Dave Schellhase (3th season)
- Home arena: Hulman Center

1984–85 Missouri Valley Conference men's basketball standings
	Conf.				Overall
Team	W		L	PCT	W		L	PCT
No. 18 Tulsa	12	–	4	.750	23	–	8	.742
Illinois State	11	–	5	.688	22	–	8	.733
Wichita State †	11	–	5	.688	18	–	13	.581
Bradley	9	–	7	.563	17	–	13	.567
Creighton	9	–	7	.563	20	–	12	.625
Southern Illinois	6	–	10	.375	14	–	14	.500
Indiana State	6	–	10	.375	14	–	15	.483
West Texas State	4	–	12	.250	11	–	17	.393
Drake	4	–	12	.250	12	–	15	.444
† 1985 MVC tournament winner Rankings from AP Poll

The 1984–85 Indiana State Sycamores men's basketball team represented the Indiana State University during the 1984–85 NCAA Division I men's basketball season.

== Roster ==
1984–85 Indiana State Sycamores men's basketball team
Players
Coaches

Pos.	#	Name	Height	Weight	Year	Hometown
G	51	Tim Abrams	6 ft 3 in (1.91 m)	190 lb (86 kg)	Jr	Chicago, Illinois
G	42	Chuck Cantrell	6 ft 4 in (1.93 m)	185 lb (84 kg)	Fr	Ashland, Kentucky
F	41	Jim Cox	6 ft 6 in (1.98 m)	200 lb (91 kg)	Fr	Plainfield, Indiana
F	24	Johnny Edwards	6 ft 6 in (1.98 m)	230 lb (104 kg)	So	Charlotte, North Carolina
G	14	Rick Fields	6 ft 4 in (1.93 m)	175 lb (79 kg)	Sr	Michigantown, Indiana
F	35	Ralph Johnson	6 ft 8 in (2.03 m)	180 lb (82 kg)	Fr	Bradenton, Florida
G	22	Bryan Kegerreis	6 ft 2 in (1.88 m)	175 lb (79 kg)	So	Bellevue, Ohio
C	54	Kent Marshall	6 ft 10 in (2.08 m)	230 lb (104 kg)	So	Flint, Michigan
F	34	Jeff McComb	6 ft 4 in (1.93 m)	190 lb (86 kg)	Jr	Ft. Wayne, Indiana
F	45	Lee Moore	6 ft 8 in (2.03 m)	200 lb (91 kg)	Fr	Ft. Wayne, Indiana
G	40	Scott Mugg	6 ft 4 in (1.93 m)	175 lb (79 kg)	Sr	Greentown, Indiana
C	43	Dean Oliphant	6 ft 11 in (2.11 m)	210 lb (95 kg)	Fr	Jay, Oklahoma
F	44	John S. Williams	6 ft 5 in (1.96 m)	185 lb (84 kg)	Jr	Indianapolis, Indiana
C	50	Ralph Winters	6 ft 9 in (2.06 m)	210 lb (95 kg)	Jr	Orrville, Ohio

Head coach

- Dave Schellhase

Assistant coach(es)

- Matt Brundige
- Eddie Diddle
- Jerry Hoover
- Jon Scarbrough

Legend

- (C) Team captain
- (S) Suspended
- (I) Ineligible
- (W) Walk-on
- Injured
- Current redshirt

== Schedule ==
Date time, TV	Rank^{#}	Opponent^{#}	Result	Record	Site city, state
December 1*		at Eastern Illinois	L 67–68	0–1	Lantz Arena; Charleston, Illinois
December 3*		Liberty Baptist	W 84–75	1–1	Hulman Center; Terre Haute, Indiana
December 5*		Butler	W 78–52	2–1	Hulman Center; Terre Haute, Indiana
December 8*		at Evansville	L 70–72	2–2	Roberts Municipal Stadium; Evansville, Indiana
December 11*		Minnesota	W 94–86	3–2	Hulman Center; Terre Haute, Indiana
December 15*		at Ball State	W 91–86	4–2	Irving Gymnasium; Muncie, Indiana
December 19*		SIU-Edwardsville	W 83–67	5–2	Hulman Center; Terre Haute, Indiana
December 22*		Vanderbilt	W 88–77	6–2	Hulman Center; Terre Haute, Indiana
December 29*		Millikin	W 113–60	7–2	Hulman Center; Terre Haute, Indiana
January 3		at Tulsa	L 70–91	7–3 (0–1)	Tulsa Convention Center; Tulsa, Oklahoma
January 5		at West Texas A&M	W 91–88 ^{2OT}	8–3 (1–1)	First United Bank Center; Canyon, Texas
January 10		Drake	W 73–70	9–3 (2–1)	Hulman Center; Terre Haute, Indiana
January 14		Bradley	W 76–74	10–3 (3–1)	Hulman Center; Terre Haute, Indiana
January 16		at Wichita State	L 72–88	10–4 (3–2)	Levitt Arena; Wichita, Kansas
January 20		at Creighton	L 80–111	10–5 (3–3)	Omaha Civic Auditorium; Omaha, Nebraska
January 24		Illinois State	L 83–85 ^{OT}	10–6 (3–4)	Hulman Center; Terre Haute, Indiana
January 28		at Drake	L 67–69	10–7 (3–5)	Veterans Memorial Auditorium; Des Moines, Iowa
January 31		Wichita State	L 72–88	10–8 (3–6)	Hulman Center; Terre Haute, Indiana
February 2		Tulsa	W 100–94	11–8 (4–6)	Hulman Center; Terre Haute, Indiana
February 9		Creighton	L 77–82	11–9 (4–7)	Hulman Center; Terre Haute, Indiana
February 14		at Southern Illinois	L 63–74	11–10 (4–8)	SIU Arena; Carbondale, Illinois
February 16		at Bradley	W 78–75	12–10 (5–8)	Peoria Civic Center; Peoria, Illinois
February 20*		at DePaul	L 65–77	12–11 (5–8)	Rosemont Horizon; Rosemont, Illinois
February 23		West Texas State	W 77–64	13–11 (6–8)	Hulman Center; Terre Haute, Indiana
February 25*		at Butler	L 66–67	13–12 (6–8)	Hinkle Fieldhouse; Indianapolis, Indiana
February 27		at Illinois State	L 64–75	13–13 (6–9)	Horton Field House; Normal, Illinois
March 2		Southern Illinois	L 84–85	13–14 (6–10)	Hulman Center; Terre Haute, Indiana
Missouri Valley Conference {MVC} tournament
March 5		at Illinois State; Quarterfinal	W 66–61	14–14 (6–10)	Horton Field House; Normal, Illinois
March 7		at Wichita State; Semifinals	L 65–92	14–15 (6–10)	Levitt Arena; Wichita, Kansas
*Non-conference game. ^{#}Rankings from AP Poll. (#) Tournament seedings in parentheses.
