= 1984–85 Southern Jaguars basketball team =

American college basketball season

1984–85 Southern Jaguars basketball

SWAC tournament champions

NCAA tournament
- Conference: Southwestern Athletic Conference
- Record: 19–11 (9–5 SWAC)
- Head coach: Robert Hopkins (1st season)
- Home arena: F. G. Clark Center

1984–85 SWAC men's basketball standings
	Conf.				Overall
Team	W		L	PCT	W		L	PCT
Alcorn State	13	–	1	.929	23	–	7	.767
Southern †	9	–	5	.643	19	–	11	.633
Mississippi Valley State	7	–	7	.500	18	–	11	.621
Alabama State	7	–	7	.500	14	–	17	.452
Texas Southern	6	–	8	.429	11	–	17	.393
Jackson State	6	–	8	.429	10	–	16	.385
Grambling State	4	–	10	.286	8	–	19	.296
Prairie View A&M	4	–	10	.286	5	–	22	.185
† 1985 SWAC tournament winner Rankings from AP Poll

The 1984–85 Southern Jaguars basketball team represented Southern University during the 1984–85 NCAA Division I men's basketball season. The Jaguars, led by head coach Robert Hopkins, played their home games at the F. G. Clark Center and were members of the Southwestern Athletic Conference. They finished the season 19–11, 9–5 in SWAC play to finish in second place. They were champions of the SWAC tournament to earn an automatic bid to the 1985 NCAA tournament where they lost in the opening round to No. 1 seed St. John's.

== Roster ==
1984–85 Southern Jaguars men's basketball team
Players
Coaches

Pos.	#	Name	Height	Weight	Year	Hometown
G		Byron Gabriel	6 ft 2 in (1.88 m)	—	Jr
G/F		Glenn Dedmon	6 ft 4 in (1.93 m)	—	Sr
F		John Staves	6 ft 6 in (1.98 m)	—	Jr

Head coach

- Robert Hopkins

Assistant coach(es)

Legend

- (C) Team captain
- (S) Suspended
- (I) Ineligible
- (W) Walk-on
- Injured
- Current redshirt

== Schedule ==
Date time, TV	Rank^{#}	Opponent^{#}	Result	Record	Site (attendance) city, state
Regular season
Dec 31, 1984*		at UTEP	W 84–75	6–2	Special Events Center; El Paso, Texas
Jan 7, 1985*		at Creighton	L 82–87	6–3	Omaha Civic Auditorium; Omaha, Nebraska
Mar 2, 1985		Alcorn State	L 57–60	17–10 (9–5)	F. G. Clark Activity Center; Baton Rouge, Louisiana
1985 SWAC tournament
Mar 8, 1985*		vs. Mississippi Valley State; Semifinals	W 87–82	18–10	Mississippi Coliseum; Biloxi, Mississippi
Mar 9, 1985*		vs. Alcorn State; Championship game	W 85–70	19–10	Mississippi Coliseum; Biloxi, Mississippi
1985 NCAA tournament
Mar 14, 1985*	(16 W)	vs. (1 W) No. 3 St. John's; First round	L 59–83	19–11	Jon M. Huntsman Center; Salt Lake City, Utah
*Non-conference game. ^{#}Rankings from AP Poll. (#) Tournament seedings in parentheses. W=West. All times are in Central Time.
