= 1984–85 Notre Dame Fighting Irish men's basketball team =

American college basketball season

1984–85 Notre Dame Fighting Irish men's basketball

NCAA tournament, Second round
- Conference: Independent
- Record: 21–9
- Head coach: Digger Phelps (14th season)
- Assistant coach: Pete Gillen (5th season)
- Home arena: Athletic & Convocation Center

The 1984–85 Notre Dame Fighting Irish men's basketball team represented the University of Notre Dame during the 1984-85 college basketball season. The Irish were led by head coach Digger Phelps, in his 14th season, and played their home games at the Athletic & Convocation Center in Notre Dame, Indiana. Notre Dame earned an at-large bid to the NCAA tournament as the No. 7 seed in the Southeast region. After an opening round win over Oregon State, the Irish were beaten by No. 2 seed North Carolina in the round of 32. The team finished with a 21–9 record.

== Roster ==
1984–85 Notre Dame Fighting Irish men's basketball team
Players
Coaches

Pos.	#	Name	Height	Weight	Year	Hometown
G	4	David Rivers	6 ft 2 in (1.88 m)	170 lb (77 kg)	Fr	Jersey City, New Jersey
F	15	Donald Royal	6 ft 8 in (2.03 m)	205 lb (93 kg)	So	New Orleans, Louisiana
F/C	41	Tim Kempton	6 ft 10 in (2.08 m)	240 lb (109 kg)	Jr	Jamaica, New York
		Joseph Price	6 ft 5 in (1.96 m)	200 lb (91 kg)	Jr	Marion, Indiana

Head coach

- Digger Phelps (Rider)

Assistant coach(es)

Legend

- (C) Team captain
- (S) Suspended
- (I) Ineligible
- (W) Walk-on
- Injured
- Current redshirt

== Schedule and results ==
Date time, TV	Rank^{#}	Opponent^{#}	Result	Record	Site city, state
Regular Season
Nov 25, 1984*		Manhattan	W 67–56	1–0	Athletic & Convocation Center; Notre Dame, Indiana
Nov 29, 1984*		Northwestern	W 79–61	2–0	Athletic & Convocation Center; Notre Dame, Indiana
Dec 1, 1984*		Saint Francis (PA)	W 85–45	3–0	Athletic & Convocation Center; Notre Dame, Indiana
Dec 4, 1984*		No. 11 Indiana	W 74–63	4–0	Athletic & Convocation Center; Notre Dame, Indiana
Dec 8, 1984*		at No. 2 DePaul	L 83–95	4–1	Rosemont Horizon; Rosemont, Illinois
Dec 9, 1984*		at Valparaiso	W 88–57	5–1	Athletics-Recreation Center; Valparaiso, Indiana
Dec 30, 1984*		at Creighton	L 58–60	5–2	Omaha Civic Auditorium; Omaha, Nebraska
Jan 5, 1985*		vs. Davidson	W 79–62	6–2	Charlotte Coliseum (I)
Jan 7, 1985*		at Rice	L 70–73	6–3	Tudor Fieldhouse; Houston, Texas
Jan 12, 1985*		at Marquette	W 63–62	7–3	MECCA Arena; Milwaukee, Wisconsin
Jan 16, 1985*		Holy Cross	W 96–61	8–3	Athletic & Convocation Center; Notre Dame, Indiana
Jan 20, 1985*		No. 10 DePaul	L 66–71	8–4	Athletic & Convocation Center; Notre Dame, Indiana
Jan 23, 1985*		Dayton	W 66–61	9–4	Athletic & Convocation Center; Notre Dame, Indiana
Jan 26, 1985*		at Maryland	L 65–77	9–5	Cole Fieldhouse; College Park, Maryland
Jan 28, 1985*		Providence	W 70–63	10–5	Athletic & Convocation Center; Notre Dame, Indiana
Jan 30, 1985*		Saint Louis	W 48–42	11–5	Athletic & Convocation Center; Notre Dame, Indiana
Feb 3, 1985*		at UCLA	W 53–52	12–5	Pauley Pavilion; Los Angeles, California
Feb 6, 1985*		La Salle	W 71–58	13–5	Athletic & Convocation Center; Notre Dame, Indiana
Feb 9, 1985*		No. 6 Syracuse	L 62–65	13–6	Athletic & Convocation Center; Notre Dame, Indiana
Feb 13, 1985*		New Orleans	W 79–54	14–6	Athletic & Convocation Center; Notre Dame, Indiana
Feb 16, 1985*		vs. No. 7 Duke	L 69–81	14–7	Brendan Byrne Arena; East Rutherford, New Jersey
Feb 18, 1985*		Loyola (MD)	W 61–60	15–7	Athletic & Convocation Center; Notre Dame, Indiana
Feb 20, 1985*		vs. Fordham	W 65–54	16–7	
Feb 23, 1985*		Brigham Young	W 67–58	17–7	Athletic & Convocation Center; Notre Dame, Indiana
Feb 28, 1985*		at Butler	L 69–70	17–8	Hinkle Fieldhouse; Indianapolis, Indiana
Mar 3, 1985*		Washington	W 57–50	18–8	Athletic & Convocation Center; Notre Dame, Indiana
Mar 6, 1985*		Marquette	W 66–60	19–8	Athletic & Convocation Center; Notre Dame, Indiana
Mar 9, 1985*		at Dayton	W 80–73	20–8	University of Dayton Arena; Dayton, Ohio
NCAA Tournament
Mar 14, 1985*	(7 SE)	vs. (10 SE) Oregon State; First round	W 79–70	21–8	Athletic & Convocation Center; Notre Dame, Indiana
Mar 16, 1985*	(7 SE)	vs. (2 SE) No. 7 North Carolina; Second round	L 58–60	21–9	Athletic & Convocation Center; Notre Dame, Indiana
*Non-conference game. ^{#}Rankings from AP Poll/UPI Poll. (#) Tournament seedings in parentheses.
