= Tulsa–Wichita State men's basketball rivalry =

American college basketball rivalry

- Tulsa Golden Hurricane Wichita State Shockers
- Sport: Men's basketball
- First meeting: January 6, 1931; Tulsa 32, Wichita 30
- Latest meeting: March 24, 2026; Tulsa 83, Wichita State 79
- Next meeting: 2027

Statistics
- Total meetings: 148
- All-time series: Wichita State leads 80–68
- Largest victory: Tulsa, 89–52 (1994)
- Longest win streak: Tulsa, 13 (1993–2002)
- Current win streak: Tulsa, 1 (2026–present)

Locations of Tulsa and Wichita State

The Tulsa–Wichita State men's basketball rivalry is an American college basketball rivalry between the Tulsa Golden Hurricane men's basketball team of the University of Tulsa and the Wichita State Shockers men's basketball team of Wichita State University. Wichita State leads the all-time series 80–68.

== History ==
The first game played between the two schools took place on January 6, 1931, in Wichita, Kansas. Tulsa won 32–30. The teams would play each other annually as members of the Missouri Valley Conference from 1934 to 1996 and from 2000 to 2005. The rivalry maintained a certain balance between the two schools until a run of Tulsa dominance in the rivalry culminating with thirteen straight wins over Wichita State from 1993 to 2002. Since 2003, Wichita State has won ten of their past eleven matchups with Tulsa, losing only in 2015 as the No. 9 ranked team in the country.

The rivalry was fully renewed when Wichita State joined The American for all sports except for football. In their first game since 1995 as conference-mates, the Golden Hurricane played the No. 5 ranked Shockers close, losing only by three.

== Game results ==
Tulsa victories	Wichita State victories

No.	Date	Location	Winner	Score
1	January 6, 1931	Wichita	Tulsa	32–30
2	January 15, 1931	Tulsa	Wichita	28–26
3	December 14, 1935	Wichita	Wichita	29–21
4	February 5, 1946	Tulsa	Wichita	42–35
5	February 9, 1946	Wichita	Wichita	33–29
6	January 24, 1947	Wichita	Tulsa	35–34
7	February 21, 1947	Tulsa	Wichita	29–23
8	January 17, 1948	Wichita	Tulsa	45–44
9	January 27, 1948	Tulsa	Wichita	54–48
10	February 12, 1949	Wichita	Wichita	42–35
11	February 22, 1949	Tulsa	Wichita	54–43
12	January 10, 1950	Tulsa	Tulsa	42–36
13	February 11, 1950	Wichita	Tulsa	44–40
14	January 6, 1951	Wichita	Wichita	51–44
15	February 27, 1951	Tulsa	Tulsa	59–48
16	January 7, 1952	Tulsa	Tulsa	74–46
17	February 28, 1952	Wichita	Tulsa	61–53
18	January 21, 1953	Wichita	Tulsa	96–82
19	February 17, 1953	Tulsa	Wichita	81–70
20	January 9, 1954	Tulsa	Wichita	75–65
21	January 26, 1954	Wichita	Wichita	65–51
22	January 15, 1955	Wichita	Tulsa	67–65
23	March 5, 1955	Tulsa	Tulsa	77–62
24	January 14, 1956	Tulsa	Wichita	64–56
25	March 3, 1956	Wichita	Wichita	71–51
26	January 19, 1957	Wichita	Tulsa	61–60
27	February 9, 1957	Tulsa	Wichita	72–53
28	January 18, 1958	Tulsa	Wichita	74–63
29	February 15, 1958	Wichita	Wichita	66–64
30	December 27, 1958	Oklahoma City	Tulsa	80–75
31	January 17, 1959	Wichita	Wichita	91–71
32	March 7, 1959	Tulsa	Wichita	61–60
33	January 16, 1960	Tulsa	Tulsa	68–64
34	March 5, 1960	Tulsa	Wichita	90–73
35	January 28, 1961	Wichita	Wichita	91–74
36	February 11, 1961	Tulsa	Wichita	87–70
37	January 18, 1962	Tulsa	Tulsa	86–77
38	March 3, 1962	Wichita	Tulsa	63–60
39	January 15, 1963	Tulsa	Tulsa	85–83
40	February 2, 1963	Wichita	Wichita	66–38
41	January 11, 1964	Tulsa	Wichita	88–66
42	February 29, 1964	Wichita	Wichita	98–79
43	February 18, 1965	Tulsa	Tulsa	75–64
44	March 1, 1965	Wichita	Wichita State	59–48
45	January 29, 1966	Wichita	Wichita State	87–79
46	March 5, 1966	Tulsa	Wichita State	81–79
47	January 28, 1967	Tulsa	Tulsa	68–61
48	March 4, 1967	Wichita	Tulsa	70–57
49	January 27, 1968	Wichita	Wichita State	86–78
50	March 9, 1968	Tulsa	Wichita State	85–81
51	February 1, 1969	Tulsa	Tulsa	94–69
52	March 3, 1969	Wichita	Wichita State	95–87
53	January 31, 1970	Wichita	Tulsa	81–73
54	March 2, 1970	Tulsa	Tulsa	108–92
55	January 30, 1971	Tulsa	Tulsa	89–86
56	March 1, 1971	Wichita	Tulsa	93–69
57	January 29, 1972	Wichita	Wichita State	92–60
58	March 2, 1972	Tulsa	Tulsa	88–83
59	January 27, 1973	Wichita	Tulsa	96–91
60	March 3, 1973	Wichita	Tulsa	97–91
61	January 10, 1974	Tulsa	Wichita State	81–79
62	February 21, 1974	Wichita	Wichita State	67–66
63	January 23, 1975	Tulsa	Tulsa	74–63
64	February 15, 1975	Wichita	Wichita State	71–67
65	January 17, 1976	Wichita	Wichita State	74–71
66	February 7, 1976	Wichita	Wichita State	70–61
67	January 20, 1977	Wichita	Wichita State	68–48
68	February 10, 1977	Tulsa	Tulsa	71–64
69	January 16, 1978	Tulsa	Wichita State	102–84
70	February 16, 1978	Wichita	Wichita State	64–56
71	January 13, 1979	Tulsa	Wichita State	94–93
72	January 27, 1979	Wichita	Tulsa	88–86
73	January 7, 1980	Wichita	Wichita State	91–83
74	February 23, 1980	Tulsa	Tulsa	79–78
75	January 10, 1981	Tulsa	Tulsa	91–84

No.	Date	Location	Winner	Score
76	February 16, 1981	Wichita	Tulsa	74–72
77	January 16, 1982	Tulsa	No. 18 Tulsa	99–88
78	February 6, 1982	Wichita	No. 11 Tulsa	80–75
79	January 13, 1983	Wichita	Wichita State	92–74
80	February 19, 1983	Tulsa	No. 15 Wichita State	84–81
81	February 2, 1984	Wichita	Wichita State	66–64
82	February 18, 1984	Tulsa	No. 12 Tulsa	105–97
83	March 9, 1984	Tulsa	Tulsa	86–80
84	February 9, 1985	Wichita	No. 19 Tulsa	87–75
85	March 2, 1985	Tulsa	No. 15 Tulsa	67–66
86	March 7, 1985	Tulsa	Wichita State	84–82
87	January 25, 1986	Tulsa	Tulsa	69–58
88	February 17, 1986	Wichita	Wichita State	65–62
89	January 31, 1987	Tulsa	Tulsa	72–58
90	February 26, 1987	Wichita	Wichita State	63–61
91	March 2, 1987	Tulsa	Wichita State	79–74
92	February 18, 1988	Wichita	Wichita State	65–59
93	February 27, 1988	Tulsa	Wichita State	79–77
94	March 5, 1988	Peoria	Wichita State	74–66
95	January 14, 1989	Wichita	Wichita State	75–68
96	February 16, 1989	Tulsa	Tulsa	60–57
97	January 18, 1990	Wichita	Wichita State	60–59
98	February 15, 1990	Tulsa	Tulsa	78–75
99	January 12, 1991	Tulsa	Wichita State	83–74
100	January 31, 1991	Wichita	Wichita State	65–61
101	March 2, 1991	St. Louis	Tulsa	71–52
102	February 10, 1992	Tulsa	Tulsa	70–66
103	February 20, 1992	Wichita	Tulsa	74–60
104	January 30, 1993	Wichita	Wichita State	77–76
105	February 27, 1993	Tulsa	Tulsa	80–63
106	February 9, 1994	Tulsa	Tulsa	79–64
107	February 23, 1994	Wichita	Tulsa	89–52
108	January 12, 1995	Wichita	Tulsa	79–52
109	February 20, 1995	Tulsa	Tulsa	67–58
110	March 4, 1995	St. Louis	Tulsa	77–63
111	February 10, 1996	Wichita	Tulsa	75–47
112	February 24, 1996	Tulsa	Tulsa	72–66
113	December 19, 1996	Wichita	Tulsa	56–53
114	December 6, 1997	Tulsa	Tulsa	50–40
115	December 22, 2000	Tulsa	Tulsa	78–49
116	December 8, 2001	Wichita	Tulsa	82–76
117	December 4, 2002	Tulsa	No. 19 Tulsa	80–69
118	December 20, 2003	Wichita	Wichita State	66–58
119	December 18, 2004	Tulsa	Wichita State	71–66
120	December 21, 2010	Wichita	Wichita State	82–79
121	December 7, 2011	Tulsa	Wichita State	77–67
122	November 28, 2012	Wichita	Wichita State	86–80
123	November 20, 2013	Tulsa	No. 14 Wichita State	77–54
124	November 29, 2014	Wichita	No. 9 Wichita State	75–55
125	November 17, 2015	Tulsa	Tulsa	77–67
126	November 16, 2016	Wichita	Wichita State	80–53
127	January 13, 2018	Tulsa	No. 5 Wichita State	72–53
128	January 28, 2018	Wichita	No. 17 Wichita State	90–71
129	February 2, 2019	Wichita	Wichita State	79–68
130	February 20, 2019	Tulsa	Wichita State	81–60
131	February 1, 2020	Tulsa	Tulsa	54–51
132	March 8, 2020	Wichita	Wichita State	79–57
133	December 15, 2020	Tulsa	Wichita State	69–65
134	January 13, 2021	Wichita	Wichita State	71–53
135	February 1, 2022	Wichita	Wichita State	58–48
136	March 2, 2022	Tulsa	Wichita State	70–62
137	March 10, 2022	Fort Worth	Tulsa	73–67
138	January 14, 2023	Wichita	Wichita State	73–69
139	February 5, 2023	Tulsa	Wichita State	86–75
140	March 9, 2023	Fort Worth	Wichita State	81–63
141	January 31, 2024	Tulsa	Tulsa	79–68
142	February 21, 2024	Wichita	Wichita State	79–63
143	January 26, 2025	Tulsa	Tulsa	84–77
144	March 9, 2025	Wichita	Tulsa	73–63
145	February 1, 2026	Tulsa	Tulsa	93–83
146	February 14, 2026	Wichita	Wichita State	81–77
147	March 14, 2026	Birmingham	Wichita State	81–68
148	March 24, 2026	Tulsa	Tulsa	83–79
Series: Wichita State leads 80–68
