= 1984–85 Idaho Vandals men's basketball team =

American college basketball season

1984–85 Idaho Vandals men's basketball
- Conference: Big Sky Conference
- Record: 8–22 (1–13 Big Sky)
- Head coach: Bill Trumbo (2nd season)
- Assistant coaches: Jim Halm; Garry Mendenhall
- Home arena: Kibbie Dome

1984–85 Big Sky men's basketball standings
	Conf.				Overall
Team	W		L	PCT	W		L	PCT
Nevada †	11	–	3	.786	21	–	10	.677
Montana	10	–	4	.714	22	–	7	.759
Weber State	9	–	5	.643	20	–	9	.690
Northern Arizona	8	–	6	.571	17	–	12	.586
Montana State	7	–	7	.500	11	–	17	.393
Boise State	5	–	9	.357	16	–	13	.552
Idaho State	5	–	9	.357	15	–	18	.455
Idaho	1	–	13	.071	8	–	22	.267
† 1985 Big Sky tournament winner

The 1984–85 Idaho Vandals men's basketball team represented the University of Idaho during the 1984–85 NCAA Division I men's basketball season. Members of the Big Sky Conference, the Vandals were led by second-year head coach Bill Trumbo and played their home games on campus at the Kibbie Dome in Moscow, Idaho.

The Vandals were 8–21 overall in the regular season and 1–13 in conference play, in last place again. At the conference tournament at Boise, the Vandals met league champion Nevada in the quarterfinal and lost by three points. The sole conference victory was a home blowout of Idaho State in early February in a rare Sunday afternoon game.

Idaho hosted and defeated Palouse neighbor Washington State by nineteen in early December, the fourth win over the Cougars in the last five meetings. Gonzaga edged the Vandals by two points in Spokane on January 2 for a second straight win in the series (following four consecutive losses).

The main basketball court of the Kibbie Dome was originally smooth tartan rubber (urethane), poured directly onto the pavement floor, resulting in a very hard and unforgiving surface, but also a tremendous home court advantage under head coach Don Monson in the early 1980s. After nine seasons, it was replaced in the fall of 1984 with a conventional hardwood floor, acquired from the University of Arizona in Tucson.

== Postseason result ==
Date time, TV	Rank^{#}	Opponent^{#}	Result	Record	Site (attendance) city, state
Big Sky tournament
Thu, March 7; 6:00 pm	(8)	vs. (1) Nevada; Quarterfinal	L 80–83	8–22	BSU Pavilion; Boise, Idaho
*Non-conference game. ^{#}Rankings from AP poll. (#) Tournament seedings in parentheses. All times are in Pacific time.
