= 1984–85 Tulsa Golden Hurricane men's basketball team =

American college basketball season

1984–85 Tulsa Golden Hurricane men's basketball

MVC Regular Season champion

NCAA tournament
- Conference: Missouri Valley Conference

Ranking
- Coaches: No. 18
- AP: No. 18
- Record: 23–8 (12–4 MVC)
- Head coach: Nolan Richardson (5th season)
- Assistant coaches: Scott Edgar (5th season); Al Grushkin; Rob Spivery
- Home arena: Tulsa Convention Center

1984–85 Missouri Valley Conference men's basketball standings
	Conf.				Overall
Team	W		L	PCT	W		L	PCT
No. 18 Tulsa	12	–	4	.750	23	–	8	.742
Illinois State	11	–	5	.688	22	–	8	.733
Wichita State †	11	–	5	.688	18	–	13	.581
Bradley	9	–	7	.563	17	–	13	.567
Creighton	9	–	7	.563	20	–	12	.625
Southern Illinois	6	–	10	.375	14	–	14	.500
Indiana State	6	–	10	.375	14	–	15	.483
West Texas State	4	–	12	.250	11	–	17	.393
Drake	4	–	12	.250	12	–	15	.444
† 1985 MVC tournament winner Rankings from AP Poll

The 1984–85 Tulsa Golden Hurricane men's basketball team represented the University of Tulsa as a member of the Missouri Valley Conference during the 1984–85 college basketball season. The Golden Hurricane played their home games at the Tulsa Convention Center. Led by head coach Nolan Richardson, serving in his final season at the school, they finished the season 23–8 overall and 12–4 in conference play to finish tied atop the MVC standings. The Golden Hurricane lost to Wichita State in overtime in the championship game of the MVC tournament, but received an at-large bid to the NCAA tournament as the No. 6 seed in the West region. Tulsa lost to No. 11 seed UTEP in the opening round.

Guard Steve Harris ended his career as the all-time scoring leader (2,272) in program history and first Golden Hurricane player to exceed 2,000 career points. Harris's mark would stand for 12 seasons before Shea Seals finished his career with a total only 16 points greater (2,288).

== Roster ==
1984–85 Tulsa Golden Hurricane men's basketball team
Players
Coaches

Pos.	#	Name	Height	Weight	Year	Hometown
G		Carlton McKinney	6 ft 4 in (1.93 m)	—	So
G	20	Steve Harris	6 ft 5 in (1.96 m)	190 lb (86 kg)	Sr	Kansas City, Missouri
G	21	Byron Boudreaux	6 ft 4 in (1.93 m)	—	So
G	35	Tracy Moore	6 ft 5 in (1.96 m)	190 lb (86 kg)	Fr	Oklahoma City, Oklahoma
F/C	41	Herb Johnson	6 ft 10 in (2.08 m)	—	Sr

Head coach

Nolan Richardson

Assistant coach(es)

Legend

- (C) Team captain
- (S) Suspended
- (I) Ineligible
- (W) Walk-on
- Injured
- Current redshirt

== Schedule and results ==
Date time, TV	Rank^{#}	Opponent^{#}	Result	Record	Site (attendance) city, state
Regular season
Nov 24, 1984*		Fort Valley State	W 125–83	1–0	Tulsa Convention Center (8,321); Tulsa, Oklahoma
Nov 27, 1984*		at Oral Roberts	W 86–82	2–0	Mabee Center (10,575); Tulsa, Oklahoma
Nov 30, 1984*		at Arizona	L 80–84	2–1	McKale Center (10,789); Tucson, Arizona
Dec 8, 1984*		Youngstown State	W 67–49	3–1	Tulsa Convention Center (8,127); Tulsa, Oklahoma
Dec 15, 1984*		at Arkansas	L 66–70	3–2	Barnhill Arena (7,720); Fayetteville, Arkansas
Dec 17, 1984*		Drexel	W 86–62	4–2	Tulsa Convention Center (8,204); Tulsa, Oklahoma
Dec 22, 1984*		Oklahoma State	W 96–83	5–2	Tulsa Convention Center (9,200); Tulsa, Oklahoma
Dec 28, 1984*		East Carolina; First Tulsa Classic	W 86–63	6–2	Tulsa Convention Center (8,736); Tulsa, Oklahoma
Dec 29, 1984*		Alcorn State; First Tulsa Classic	W 92–79	7–2	Tulsa Convention Center (9,200); Tulsa, Oklahoma
Jan 3, 1985		Indiana State	W 90–71	8–2 (1–0)	Tulsa Convention Center (8,673); Tulsa, Oklahoma
Jan 5, 1985		at Southern Illinois	W 98–96	9–2 (2–0)	SIU Arena (4,000); Carbondale, Illinois
Jan 9, 1985*		No. 8 Oklahoma	W 104–89	10–2	Tulsa Convention Center (9,200); Tulsa, Oklahoma
Jan 12, 1985		Creighton	W 70–66	11–2 (3–0)	Tulsa Convention Center (9,200); Tulsa, Oklahoma
Jan 14, 1985*	No. 20	Oral Roberts	W 71–61	12–2	Tulsa Convention Center (9,200); Tulsa, Oklahoma
Jan 17, 1985	No. 20	at Illinois State	W 79–69 ^{OT}	13–2 (4–0)	Horton Field House (7,572); Normal, Illinois
Jan 19, 1985	No. 20	at Bradley	W 69–56	14–2 (5–0)	Carver Arena (7,988); Peoria, Illinois
Jan 24, 1985	No. 17	West Texas State	W 110–90	15–2 (6–0)	Tulsa Convention Center (9,200); Tulsa, Oklahoma
Jan 26, 1985	No. 17	Southern Illinois	W 66–60	16–2 (7–0)	Tulsa Convention Center (9,200); Tulsa, Oklahoma
Jan 30, 1985	No. 12	at Drake	W 67–66	17–2 (8–0)	Veterans Memorial Auditorium (4,673); Des Moines, Iowa
Feb 2, 1985	No. 12	at Indiana State	L 94–100	17–3 (8–1)	Hulman Center (6,107); Terre Haute, Indiana
Feb 6, 1985	No. 17	Illinois State	L 72–73 ^{OT}	17–4 (8–2)	Tulsa Convention Center (9,200); Tulsa, Oklahoma
Feb 9, 1985	No. 17	at Wichita State	W 87–75	18–4 (9–2)	Levitt Arena (10,666); Wichita, Kansas
Feb 16, 1985	No. 15	at Creighton	W 78–63	19–4 (10–2)	Omaha Civic Auditorium (9,297); Omaha, Nebraska
Feb 21, 1985	No. 12	Bradley	L 64–69	19–5 (10–3)	Tulsa Convention Center (9,200); Tulsa, Oklahoma
Feb 23, 1985	No. 12	Drake	W 79–56	20–5 (11–3)	Tulsa Convention Center (9,200); Tulsa, Oklahoma
Feb 28, 1985	No. 15	at West Texas State	L 62–70	20–6 (11–4)	WT Fieldhouse (2,291); Canyon, Texas
Mar 2, 1985	No. 15	Wichita State	W 67–66	21–6 (12–4)	Tulsa Convention Center (9,200); Tulsa, Oklahoma
MVC tournament
Mar 5, 1985*	(1) No. 15	(8) West Texas State; Quarterfinals	W 74–69	22–6	Tulsa Convention Center (8,293); Tulsa, Oklahoma
Mar 6, 1985*	(1) No. 15	(4) Bradley; Semifinals	W 85–77	23–6	Tulsa Convention Center (8,433); Tulsa, Oklahoma
Mar 7, 1985*	(1) No. 15	(3) Wichita State; Championship game	L 82–84 ^{OT}	23–7	Tulsa Convention Center (8,733); Tulsa, Oklahoma
NCAA Tournament
Mar 15, 1985*	(6 W) No. 18	vs. (11 W) UTEP; First round	L 75–79	23–8	University Arena (12,256); Albuquerque, New Mexico
*Non-conference game. ^{#}Rankings from AP. (#) Tournament seedings in parentheses. W=West. All times are in Central.

== NBA draft ==
Round	Pick	Player	NBA club
1	19	Steve Harris	Houston Rockets
