= 1984–85 Nevada Wolf Pack men's basketball team =

American college basketball season

1984–85 Nevada Wolf Pack men's basketball

Big Sky tournament champion

NCAA tournament
- Conference: Big Sky Conference
- Record: 21–10 (11–3 Big Sky)
- Head coach: Sonny Allen (3rd season)
- Home arena: Lawlor Events Center

1984–85 Big Sky men's basketball standings
	Conf.				Overall
Team	W		L	PCT	W		L	PCT
Nevada †	11	–	3	.786	21	–	10	.677
Montana	10	–	4	.714	22	–	7	.759
Weber State	9	–	5	.643	20	–	9	.690
Northern Arizona	8	–	6	.571	17	–	12	.586
Montana State	7	–	7	.500	11	–	17	.393
Boise State	5	–	9	.357	16	–	13	.552
Idaho State	5	–	9	.357	15	–	18	.455
Idaho	1	–	13	.071	8	–	22	.267
† 1985 Big Sky tournament winner

The 1984–85 Nevada Wolf Pack men's basketball team represented the University of Nevada, Reno during the 1984–85 NCAA Division I men's basketball season. The Wolf Pack, led by third year head coach Sonny Allen, played their home games at the Lawlor Events Center on their campus in Reno, Nevada as members of the Big Sky Conference.

After finishing first in the conference regular season standings, Nevada won the Big Sky tournament to receive an automatic bid to the NCAA tournament as No. 14 seed in the West Region. The Wolf Pack was beaten by No. 3 seed Washington in the opening round, 65–56. The team finished with a record of 21–10 (11–3 Big Sky).

== Roster ==
1984–85 Nevada Wolf Pack men's basketball team
Players	Coaches
Pos. / # / Name / Height / Weight / Year / Hometown; G / / Curtis High / 6 ft 0 in (1.83 m) / — / Sr	Head coach: Sonny Allen (Marshall); Assistant coach(es) Legend: (C) Team captain; (S) Suspended; (I) Ineligible; (W) Walk-on; Injured; Current redshirt; Roster

== Schedule and results ==
Date time, TV	Rank^{#}	Opponent^{#}	Result	Record	Site city, state
Regular season
Nov 23, 1984*		No. 11 UNLV	W 97–89	1–0	Lawlor Events Center; Reno, Nevada
Mar 2, 1985		at Northern Arizona	W 77–66	18–9 (11–3)	Walkup Skydome; Flagstaff, Arizona
Big Sky tournament
Mar 5, 1985*		vs. Idaho; Quarterfinals	W 83–80	19–9	BSU Pavilion; Boise, Idaho
Mar 6, 1985*		at Boise State; Semifinals	W 79–67	20–9	BSU Pavilion; Boise, Idaho
Mar 7, 1985*		vs. Idaho State; Championship game	W 79–63	21–9	BSU Pavilion; Boise, Idaho
NCAA tournament
Mar 15, 1985*	(14 W)	vs. (3 W) No. 16 NC State; First round	L 56–65	21–10	University Arena; Albuquerque, New Mexico
*Non-conference game. (#) Tournament seedings in parentheses. W=West. All times are in Pacific Time.
