= 1985 SWAC men's basketball tournament =

Basketball Tournament March 1985 in Mississippi

- Classification: Division I
- Season: 1984–85
- Teams: 4
- Site: Mississippi Coast Coliseum; Biloxi, Mississippi
- Champions: Southern (1st title)
- Winning coach: Robert Hopkins (1st title)

1984–85 SWAC men's basketball standings
	Conf.				Overall
Team	W		L	PCT	W		L	PCT
Alcorn State	13	–	1	.929	23	–	7	.767
Southern †	9	–	5	.643	19	–	11	.633
Mississippi Valley State	7	–	7	.500	18	–	11	.621
Alabama State	7	–	7	.500	14	–	17	.452
Texas Southern	6	–	8	.429	11	–	17	.393
Jackson State	6	–	8	.429	10	–	16	.385
Grambling State	4	–	10	.286	8	–	19	.296
Prairie View A&M	4	–	10	.286	5	–	22	.185
† 1985 SWAC tournament winner Rankings from AP Poll

The 1985 SWAC men's basketball tournament was held March 8–9, 1985, at the Mississippi Coast Coliseum in Biloxi, Mississippi. Southern defeated Alcorn State, 85–70 in the championship game. The Jaguars received the conference's automatic bid to the 1985 NCAA tournament as No. 16 seed in the West Region.

== Bracket and results ==
Semifinals; March 8
1	Alcorn State	58
4	Texas Southern	56
2	Southern	87
3	Mississippi Valley State	82

Final; March 9
1	Alcorn State	70
2	Southern	85
