= 1985 Big Sky Conference men's basketball tournament =

- Classification: Division I
- Season: 1984–85
- Teams: 8
- Site: BSU Pavilion; Boise, Idaho
- Champions: Nevada (2nd title)
- Winning coach: Sonny Allen (2nd title)
- MVP: Dwayne Randall (Nevada)

1984–85 Big Sky men's basketball standings
	Conf.				Overall
Team	W		L	PCT	W		L	PCT
Nevada †	11	–	3	.786	21	–	10	.677
Montana	10	–	4	.714	22	–	7	.759
Weber State	9	–	5	.643	20	–	9	.690
Northern Arizona	8	–	6	.571	17	–	12	.586
Montana State	7	–	7	.500	11	–	17	.393
Boise State	5	–	9	.357	16	–	13	.552
Idaho State	5	–	9	.357	15	–	18	.455
Idaho	1	–	13	.071	8	–	22	.267
† 1985 Big Sky tournament winner

The 1985 Big Sky Conference men's basketball tournament was held March 7–9 at the BSU Pavilion at Boise State University in Boise, Idaho.

Regular season champion Nevada defeated seventh-seeded Idaho State in the championship game 79–63 for their second consecutive (and second overall) Big Sky tournament title. Nevada was nearly upset in the first round by last-place Idaho, but held to win by three points and advanced.

== Format ==
For the second year, all eight Big Sky members participated in the conference tournament; this was the first in which all seven games were played at the same venue. Teams were seeded based on regular season conference records, and all were entered into the quarterfinal round. For the first time, the host team was not the top seed, as Boise State finished tied for sixth in the regular season and was seeded seventh.

Two upsets occurred in the first round, as the second and third seeds were eliminated.

== Bracket ==
Quarterfinals; Thursday, March 7
1	Nevada	83
8	Idaho	80
5	Montana State	62
4	Northern Arizona	69
3	Weber State	78
6	Idaho State	80
7	Boise State	67
2	Montana	54

Semifinals; Friday, March 8
1	Nevada	79
4	Northern Arizona	67
6	Idaho State	89
7	Boise State	86

Championship; Saturday, March 9
1	Nevada	79
6	Idaho State	63

== NCAA tournament ==
The Wolf Pack received an automatic bid to the 64-team NCAA tournament, where they lost to NC State (also nicknamed the Wolfpack) in the first round at The Pit in Albuquerque, New Mexico. Regular season runner-up Montana played in the 32-team NIT, but lost 78–47 at UCLA in the first round; the Bruins went on to win the NIT title.
