= 1985 AMCU-8 men's basketball tournament =

- Classification: Division I
- Season: 1984–85
- Teams: 8
- Site: John Q. Hammons Student Center; Springfield, Missouri
- Champions: Eastern Illinois (1st title)
- Winning coach: Rick Samuels (1st title)
- MVP: None selected
- AMCU-8 men's basketball tournaments

1984–85 AMCU-8 Conference men's basketball standings
| | Conf. | | | | Overall |
| Team | W | | L | PCT | W | | L | PCT |
|---|---|---|---|---|---|---|---|---|
| Cleveland State | 11 | – | 3 | .786 | 21 | – | 8 | .724 |
| Western Illinois | 10 | – | 4 | .714 | 14 | – | 14 | .500 |
| Eastern Illinois † | 9 | – | 5 | .643 | 20 | – | 10 | .667 |
| Southwest Missouri State | 8 | – | 6 | .571 | 17 | – | 13 | .567 |
| Illinois–Chicago | 7 | – | 7 | .500 | 14 | – | 14 | .500 |
| Northern Iowa | 6 | – | 8 | .429 | 12 | – | 16 | .429 |
| Valparaiso | 4 | – | 10 | .286 | 8 | – | 20 | .286 |
| Wisconsin–Green Bay | 1 | – | 13 | .071 | 4 | – | 24 | .143 |
† 1985 AMCU-8 tournament winner Rankings from

The 1985 AMCU-8 men's basketball tournament was held March 6–10, 1985 at the John Q. Hammons Student Center at Southwest Missouri State University in Springfield, Missouri.

Eastern Illinois defeated hosts Southwest Missouri State in the title game, 75–64, to win their first AMCU-8 championship. However, the Panthers did not earn a bid to the 1985 NCAA Division I men's basketball tournament.

== Format ==
All eight conference members qualified for the tournament. First round seedings were based on regular season record, and the highest-seeded team in each game served as the host.

== Bracket ==
Quarterfinals; Wednesday, March 6
1 | Cleveland State | 85
8 | Wisconsin–Green Bay | 67
4 | Southwest Missouri State | 104
5 | Illinois–Chicago | 86
2 | Western Illinois | 76
7 | Valparaiso | 71
3 | Eastern Illinois | 66
6 | Northern Iowa | 65

Semifinals; Thursday, March 7 Friday, March 8
1 | Cleveland State | 76
4 | Southwest Missouri State | 79
2 | Western Illinois | 67
3 | Eastern Illinois | 74

Final; Sunday, March 10
4 | Southwest Missouri State | 64
3 | Eastern Illinois | 75
