= 1985 Missouri Valley Conference men's basketball tournament =

- Classification: Division I
- Season: 1984–85
- Teams: 8
- Site: Campus sites
- Finals site: Tulsa Convention Center; Tulsa, Oklahoma
- Champions: Wichita State (1st title)
- Winning coach: Gene Smithson (1st title)

1984–85 Missouri Valley Conference men's basketball standings
	Conf.				Overall
Team	W		L	PCT	W		L	PCT
No. 18 Tulsa	12	–	4	.750	23	–	8	.742
Illinois State	11	–	5	.688	22	–	8	.733
Wichita State †	11	–	5	.688	18	–	13	.581
Bradley	9	–	7	.563	17	–	13	.567
Creighton	9	–	7	.563	20	–	12	.625
Southern Illinois	6	–	10	.375	14	–	14	.500
Indiana State	6	–	10	.375	14	–	15	.483
West Texas State	4	–	12	.250	11	–	17	.393
Drake	4	–	12	.250	12	–	15	.444
† 1985 MVC tournament winner Rankings from AP Poll

The 1985 Missouri Valley Conference men's basketball tournament was played after the conclusion of the 1984–1985 regular season. The quarterfinal and semifinal rounds were played on campus sites with the final contested at the Tulsa Convention Center in Tulsa, Oklahoma.

The Wichita State Shockers defeated the fifteenth ranked Tulsa Golden Hurricane in the championship game, 84-82, and as a result won their first MVC Tournament title to earn an automatic bid to the 1985 NCAA tournament.

== Bracket ==
Quarterfinals; March 5, 1985; Campus Sites
1	15 Tulsa	74
8	West Texas State	69
4	Bradley	66
5	Creighton	59
2	Illinois State	61
7	Indiana State	66
3	Wichita State	69
6	Southern Illinois	66

Semifinals; March 6, 1985; Campus Sites
1	15 Tulsa	85
4	Bradley	77
7	Indiana State	65
3	Wichita State	92

Final; March 7, 1985; Tulsa Convention Center
1	15 Tulsa	82
3	Wichita State	84
