= Peter Roby =

American basketball coach (born 1957)

Peter P. Roby (born August 27, 1957) is the former athletic director of Northeastern University. Roby was introduced as the ninth athletic director of the university in June 2007 and retired in February 2018. In 2007 Roby was named as one of the 100 Most Influential Sports Educators.

== College basketball ==
Roby served six seasons as head basketball coach for Harvard University and three years as Harvard's assistant basketball coach. He posted a record of 58-98, a .372 winning percentage, and never led his team to a .500 record. Before joining Harvard, Roby was an assistant coach at Stanford University, Dartmouth College, his alma mater, and the U.S. Military Academy.

== Reebok ==
After his college basketball coaching career came to a close, Roby started a business career at Reebok where he held several marketing positions, such as director of Key Account Marketing and the director of U.S. Sports Marketing and ultimately was the vice president of U.S. Marketing for the last three years.

== Center for the Study of Sport in Society ==
In 2002, Roby was hired to lead Northeastern University's Center for the Study of Sport in Society. In that role Roby, became an expert about bringing "positive social change through research, education and advocacy." Roby has been quoted and interviewed for numerous national publications. In 2010, Roby received the first annual Richard Lapchick Sport and Social Justice Innovation Award.

== Head coaching record ==
Record table
| Season | Team | Overall | Conference | Standing | Postseason |
|---|---|---|---|---|---|
Harvard Crimson (Ivy League) (1985–1991)
| 1985–86 | Harvard | 6–20 | 2–12 | 8th | |
| 1986–87 | Harvard | 9–17 | 4–10 | 7th | |
| 1987–88 | Harvard | 11–15 | 6–8 | 6th | |
| 1988–89 | Harvard | 11–15 | 7–7 | 4th | |
| 1989–90 | Harvard | 12–14 | 7–7 | 3rd | |
| 1990–91 | Harvard | 9–17 | 6–8 | 3rd | |
| Harvard: | | 58–98 | 32–52 | | |
| Total: | | 58–98 | | | |
