= 1984–85 Illinois State Redbirds men's basketball team =

American college basketball season

1984–85 Illinois State Redbirds men's basketball

American Savings Classic champion Fleet Classic champion

NCAA tournament, Second Round
- Conference: Missouri Valley Conference
- Record: 22–8 (11–5 MVC)
- Head coach: Bob Donewald (7th season)
- Home arena: Horton Field House

1984–85 Missouri Valley Conference men's basketball standings
	Conf.				Overall
Team	W		L	PCT	W		L	PCT
No. 18 Tulsa	12	–	4	.750	23	–	8	.742
Illinois State	11	–	5	.688	22	–	8	.733
Wichita State †	11	–	5	.688	18	–	13	.581
Bradley	9	–	7	.563	17	–	13	.567
Creighton	9	–	7	.563	20	–	12	.625
Southern Illinois	6	–	10	.375	14	–	14	.500
Indiana State	6	–	10	.375	14	–	15	.483
West Texas State	4	–	12	.250	11	–	17	.393
Drake	4	–	12	.250	12	–	15	.444
† 1985 MVC tournament winner Rankings from AP Poll

The 1984–85 Illinois State Redbirds men's basketball team represented Illinois State University during the 1984–85 NCAA Division I men's basketball season. The Redbirds, led by seventh year head coach Bob Donewald, played their home games at Horton Field House and were a member of the Missouri Valley Conference.

The Redbirds finished the season 22–8, 11–5 in conference play to finish in a tie for second place. They were the number two seed for the Missouri Valley Conference tournament by virtue of sweeping the season series over Wichita State University. They were defeated in a quarterfinal game to Indiana State University.

The Redbirds received an at-large bid to the 1985 NCAA Division I men's basketball tournament. They were assigned to the Midwest Regional as the number nine seed where they defeated the University of Southern California in the first round and lost to the University of Oklahoma in the second round.

== Roster ==
1984–85 Illinois State Redbirds men's basketball team
Players
Coaches

Pos.	#	Name	Height	Weight	Year	Hometown
G	33	Brad Duncan	6 ft 4 in (1.93 m)	—	Sr	Anderson, IN
F	24	Rickie Johnson	6 ft 5 in (1.96 m)	—	Sr	Indianapolis, IN
G	10	Michael McKenny	6 ft 1 in (1.85 m)	—	Sr	Gary, IN
F	43	Lou Stefanovic	6 ft 8 in (2.03 m)	—	Sr	Merillville, IN
G	25	William Anderson	5 ft 11 in (1.8 m)	—	Jr	Indianapolis, IN
C	54	Bill Braksick	7 ft 0 in (2.13 m)	—	So	Flanagan, IL
F	35	Derrick Sanders	6 ft 6 in (1.98 m)	—	So	Chicago, IL
G	23	Jeff Harris	6 ft 4 in (1.93 m)	—	Fr	Indianapolis, IN
F	45	Tony Holifield	6 ft 7 in (2.01 m)	—	Fr	Oak Park, MI
F	32	Cliff Peterson	6 ft 7 in (2.01 m)	—	Fr	Detroit, MI
G	42	Art Pollard	6 ft 2 in (1.88 m)	—	Fr	East Chicago, IN
F	34	Matt Taphorn	6 ft 5 in (1.96 m)	—	Fr	Pekin, IL

Head coach

- Bob Donewald (Hanover)

Assistant coach(es)

- Terry Smith
- Pat Cunningham
- Bruce Stone
- Anthony Jones
- Dwayne Tyus

Legend

- (C) Team captain
- (S) Suspended
- (I) Ineligible
- (W) Walk-on
- Injured
- Current redshirt

== Schedule ==
Date time, TV	Rank^{#}	Opponent^{#}	Result	Record	High points	High rebounds	High assists	Site (attendance) city, state
Exhibition Season
November 19, 1984*; 7:30 pm		Yugoslavia National Team	W 65–59		13 – Stefanovic	–	–	Horton Field House; Normal, IL
Regular Season
November 24, 1984*; 7:30 pm		Wisconsin–Stevens Point	W 51–49	1–0	22 – Johnson	9 – Stefanovic	–	Horton Field House (5,337); Normal, IL
November 28, 1984*; 7:30 pm		Illinois–Chicago	W 93–62	2–0	29 – Stefanovic	16 – Stefanovic	–	Horton Field House (6,056); Normal, IL
December 1, 1984*; 2:30 pm		Southwest Missouri State	W 54–44	3–0	15 – McKenny, Stefanovic	7 – Johnson	–	Horton Field House (6,198); Normal, IL
December 5, 1984*; 7:30 pm		No. 2 DePaul	L 71–84	3–1	27 – Stefanovic	12 – Johnson	–	Horton Field House (7,775); Normal, IL
December 8, 1984*; 7:30 pm		at Wisconsin–Green Bay	W 52–49	4–1	15 – Stefanovic	4 – Anderson, Braksick	–	Brown County Veterans Memorial Arena (2,024); Ashwaubenon, WI
December 15, 1984*; 2:30 pm		Detroit	W 76–73	5–1	18 – Stefanovic	8 – Johnson	–	Horton Field House (6,015); Normal, IL
December 21, 1984*; 9:00 pm		vs. Texas A&M; American Savings Classic [Semifinal]	W 74–66 ^{OT}	6–1	25 – Stefanovic	6 – Stefanovic	–	Alex G. Spanos Center (2,100); Stockton, CA
December 22, 1984*; 11:00 pm		vs. San Diego; American Savings Classic [Final]	W 77–58	7–1	23 – Johnson	4 – Johnson, McKenny	–	Alex G. Spanos Center (1,680); Stockton, CA
December 28, 1984*; 6:00 pm		vs. Northeastern; Fleet Classic [Semifinal]	W 92–84	8–1	26 – Duncan	6 – Stefanovic	–	Providence Civic Center (6,349); Providence, RI
December 29, 1984*; 8:00 pm		at Providence; Fleet Classic [Final]	W 65–59	9–1	27 – Johnson	10 – Johnson	–	Providence Civic Center (8,047); Providence, RI
January 3, 1985; 7:35 pm		at Drake	W 66–56	10–1 (1–0)	19 – Stefanovic	8 – McKenny	–	Veterans Memorial Auditorium (5,360); Des Moines, IA
January 5, 1985; 7:35 pm		at Creighton	L 63–73	10–2 (1–1)	18 – Stefanovic	10 – Johnson	3 – McKenny, Stefanovic	Omaha Civic Auditorium (8,673); Omaha, NE
January 10, 1985; 7:30 pm		Southern Illinois	W 78–63	11–2 (2–1)	22 – Braksick	8 – Braksick	–	Horton Field House (5,845); Normal, IL
January 12, 1985; 2:30 pm		Wichita State	W 86–80 ^{OT}	12–2 (3–1)	23 – Stefanovic	8 – Johnson	5 – Johnson	Horton Field House (7,015); Normal, IL
January 17, 1985; 7:30 pm		No. 20 Tulsa	L 69–79 ^{OT}	12–3 (3–2)	25 – Stefanovic	12 – Stefanovic	–	Horton Field House (7,752); Normal, IL
January 19, 1985*; 2:30 pm		Chicago State	W 79–66 ^{OT}	13–3	18 – Braksick	11 – Stefanovic	–	Horton Field House (6,824); Normal, IL
January 24, 1985; 6:30 pm		at Indiana State	W 85–83 ^{OT}	14–3 (4–2)	26 – Stefanovic	12 – Stefanovic	–	Hulman Center (6,052); Terre Haute, IN
January 26, 1985; 12:30 pm, MVC-TV		Bradley	W 65–55	15–3 (5–2)	22 – Johnson	8 – McKenny	–	Horton Field House (7,747); Normal, IL
January 31, 1985; 7:35 pm		at Southern Illinois	L 50–63	15–4 (5–3)	24 – Stefanovic	7 – Braksick	–	SIU Arena (2,700); Carbondale, IL
February 6, 1985; 7:30 pm		at No. 17 Tulsa	W 73–72 ^{OT}	16–4 (6–3)	18 – Stefanovic	13 – Stefanovic	–	Tulsa Convention Center (9,200); Tulsa, OK
February 9, 1985; 2:30 pm		Drake	W 67–46	17–4 (7–3)	19 – Braksick	8 – Holifield	–	Horton Field House (7,747); Normal, IL
February 14, 1985; 7:30 pm		at West Texas State	L 66–68	17–5 (7–4)	18 – Duncan	9 – Stefanovic	9 – McKenny	WTSU Fieldhouse (1,504); Canyon, TX
February 16, 1985; 8:05 pm		at Wichita State	W 64–58	18–5 (8–4)	14 – Duncan	13 – Johnson	6 – Stefanovic	Henry Levitt Arena (10,666); Wichita, KS
February 21, 1985; 7:30 pm		West Texas State	W 74–58	19–5 (9–4)	18 – Johnson	8 – Stefanovic	–	Horton Field House (7,722); Normal, IL
February 23, 1985; 12:30 pm		Creighton	W 89–61	20–5 (10–4)	18 – Sanders	6 – Braksick, Sanders	6 – McKenny	Horton Field House (7,722); Normal, IL
February 28, 1985; 7:30 pm		Indiana State	W 75–64	21–5 (11–4)	18 – Stefanovic	11 – Johnson	–	Horton Field House (6,832); Normal, IL
March 2, 1985; 3:00 pm, WEEK		at Bradley	L 69–82	21–6 (11–5)	16 – Stefanovic	8 – Stefanovic	–	Carver Arena (10,571); Peoria, IL
Missouri Valley Conference {MVC} tournament
March 5, 1985*	(2)	(7) Indiana State; Quarterfinal	L 61–66	21–7	16 – Duncan, McKenny	10 – Stefanovic	5 – Johnson, McKenny	Horton Field House (6,020); Normal, IL
National Collegiate Athletic Association {NCAA} tournament
March 14, 1985*; 9:30 pm, NCAA Productions	(9)	vs. (8) Southern California; Midwest Region [First Round]	W 58–55	22–7	15 – Stefanovic	10 – Johnson	8 – McKenny	John Mabee Center (10,575); Tulsa, OK
March 16, 1985*; 3:45 pm, CBS	(9)	vs. (1) No. 4 Oklahoma; Midwest Region [Second Round]	L 69–75	22–8	21 – Stefanovic	5 – McKenny	4 – Johnson	John Mabee Center (10,575); Tulsa, OK
*Non-conference game. ^{#}Rankings from AP Poll. (#) Tournament seedings in parentheses. All times are in Central Standard Time.
