= 1984–85 Dayton Flyers men's basketball team =

American college basketball season

1984–85 Dayton Flyers men's basketball

NCAA tournament
- Conference: Independent
- Record: 19–10
- Head coach: Don Donoher (21st season)
- Home arena: University of Dayton Arena

The 1984–85 Dayton Flyers men's basketball team represented the University of Dayton during the 1984–85 NCAA Division I men's basketball season. The Flyers, led by head coach Don Donoher, played their home games at the University of Dayton Arena and were an NCAA independent. Dayton received a bid to the NCAA tournament as No. 9 seed in the Southeast region. They were defeated by No. 8 seed Villanova, 51–49, in the opening round. and finished the season 19–10. Villanova would go on to complete one of the most famous Cinderella runs in tournament history as they won the National championship. To this date, Villanova remains the lowest-seeded team to win the NCAA Tournament. For the second straight season, Dayton was knocked out of the NCAA Tournament by the eventual National champion.

== Roster ==
1984–85 Dayton Flyers men's basketball team
Players
Coaches

Pos.	#	Name	Height	Weight	Year	Previous school	Hometown
PG	3	Sedric Toney	6 ft 2 in (1.88 m)	175 lb (79 kg)	Sr	Western Nebraska CC	Dayton, Ohio
G	4	Ted Harris	6 ft 1 in (1.85 m)	—	Sr		Kettering, Ohio
G	11	Larry Schellenberg	6 ft 3 in (1.91 m)	—	Sr
G	14	Dan Christie	6 ft 1 in (1.85 m)	—	So
G	23	Damon Goodwin	6 ft 6 in (1.98 m)	—	Jr
F	30	Ed Young	6 ft 7 in (2.01 m)	—	Jr	Upper Sandusky	Upper Sandusky, Ohio
	33	Anthony Grant	—	—	So	Miami Senior	Miami, Florida

Head coach

- Don Donoher (Dayton)

Assistant coach(es)

Legend

- (C) Team captain
- (S) Suspended
- (I) Ineligible
- (W) Walk-on
- Injured
- Current redshirt

== Schedule and results ==
Date time, TV	Rank^{#}	Opponent^{#}	Result	Record	Site (attendance) city, state
Regular season
Nov 24, 1984*		Brooklyn	W 76–56	1–0	University of Dayton Arena; Dayton, Ohio
Dec 1, 1984*		at Providence	W 68–55	2–0	Providence Civic Center; Providence, Rhode Island
Dec 4, 1984*		at Eastern Kentucky	W 76–55	3–0	McBrayer Arena; Richmond, Kentucky
Dec 8, 1984*		Michigan	L 78–87	3–1	University of Dayton Arena; Dayton, Ohio
Dec 12, 1984*		at Miami (OH)	L 64–69	3–2	Millett Hall; Oxford, Ohio
Dec 15, 1984*		at VCU	L 61–71	3–3	Richmond Coliseum; Richmond, Virginia
Dec 17, 1984*		Central Florida	W 71–61	4–3	University of Dayton Arena; Dayton, Ohio
Dec 22, 1984*		at South Florida	W 71–66	5–3	Sun Dome; Tampa, Florida
Dec 28, 1984*		Brown	W 88–65	6–3	University of Dayton Arena; Dayton, Ohio
Dec 30, 1984*		St. Bonaventure	W 83–60	7–3	University of Dayton Arena; Dayton, Ohio
Jan 2, 1985*		Loyola–Chicago	W 80–70	8–3	University of Dayton Arena; Dayton, Ohio
Jan 5, 1985*		No. 19 Maryland	W 67–63	9–3	University of Dayton Arena; Dayton, Ohio
Jan 12, 1985*		Cincinnati	W 81–66	10–3	University of Dayton Arena; Dayton, Ohio
Jan 15, 1985*		Western Kentucky	W 53–51	11–3	University of Dayton Arena; Dayton, Ohio
Jan 19, 1985*		Towson	W 70–55	12–3	University of Dayton Arena; Dayton, Ohio
Jan 23, 1985*		at Notre Dame	L 61–66	12–4	Joyce Center; Notre Dame, Indiana
Jan 26, 1985*		No. 7 DePaul	W 65–64	13–4	University of Dayton Arena; Dayton, Ohio
Jan 28, 1985*		Miami (OH)	W 63–54	14–4	University of Dayton Arena; Dayton, Ohio
Feb 2, 1985*		at Cincinnati	L 62–83	14–5	Riverfront Coliseum; Cincinnati, Ohio
Feb 6, 1985*		at No. 18 DePaul	W 67–63	15–5	Rosemont Horizon; Rosemont, Illinois
Feb 9, 1985*		Canisius	W 60–52	16–5	University of Dayton Arena; Dayton, Ohio
Feb 13, 1985*		at Detroit	L 67–68	16–6	Calihan Hall; Detroit, Michigan
Feb 16, 1985*		at Marquette	L 55–61	16–7	MECCA Arena; Milwaukee, Wisconsin
Feb 18, 1985*		at Old Dominion	L 82–91	16–8	Norfolk Scope; Norfolk, Virginia
Feb 23, 1985*		Marquette	W 72–59	17–8	University of Dayton Arena; Dayton, Ohio
Feb 28, 1985*		Creighton	W 67–62	18–8	University of Dayton Arena; Dayton, Ohio
Mar 3, 1985*		Xavier	W 66–56	19–8	University of Dayton Arena; Dayton, Ohio
Mar 9, 1985*		Notre Dame	L 73–80	19–9	University of Dayton Arena; Dayton, Ohio
NCAA Tournament
Mar 15, 1985*	(9 SE)	vs. (8 SE) Villanova; First round	L 49–51	19–10	University of Dayton Arena; Dayton, Ohio
*Non-conference game. ^{#}Rankings from AP Poll. (#) Tournament seedings in parentheses. SE=Southeast. All times are in Eastern Time.
