= 1984–85 Marquette Warriors men's basketball team =

American college basketball season

1984–85 Marquette Warriors men's basketball

NIT, Quarterfinals L 82–94 2OT vs. Indiana
- Conference: Independent
- Record: 20–11
- Head coach: Rick Majerus (2nd season)
- Home arena: MECCA Arena

The 1984–85 Marquette Warriors men's basketball team represented Marquette University during the 1984–85 college basketball season.

== Schedule ==
| Date time, TV | Rank^{#} | Opponent^{#} | Result | Record | Site city, state |
|---|---|---|---|---|---|
| December 1 | | U. S. International | W 74–27 | 1–0 | MECCA Arena (10,550); Milwaukee, WI |
| December 4 | | Loyola (IL) | W 74–67 | 2–0 | MECCA Arena (10,108); Milwaukee, WI |
| December 6 | | at Northwestern | W 53–44 | 3–0 | Welsh–Ryan Arena (9,020); Evanston, Illinois |
| December 8 | | Northern Illinois | W 61–52 | 4–0 | MECCA Arena (11,052); Milwaukee, WI |
| December 15 | | Kansas State | L 54–55 | 4–1 | MECCA Arena (11,052); Milwaukee, WI |
| December 20 | | at Holy Cross | W 74–67 | 5–1 | Hart Recreation Center (1,800); Worcester, Massachusetts |
| December 26 | | at Minnesota | L 62–70 | 5–2 | Williams Arena (13,990); Minneapolis, Minnesota |
| December 28 | | Lehigh | W 85–56 | 6–2 | MECCA Arena (8,844); Milwaukee, WI |
| December 29 | | Gonzaga | L 54–60 | 6–3 | MECCA Arena (9,052); Milwaukee, WI |
| January 2 | | Green Bay | W 66–48 | 7–3 | MECCA Arena (10,534); Milwaukee, WI |
| January 5 | | at Colorado | W 67–52 | 8–3 | CU Events Center (5,872); Boulder, Colorado |
| January 9 | | vs. Texas A&M | L 69–77 | 8–4 | The Summit (2,961); Houston, TX |
| January 12 | | Notre Dame | L 62–63 | 8–5 | MECCA Arena (11,052); Milwaukee, WI |
| January 16 | | Utica | W 55–53 | 9–5 | MECCA Arena (10,044); Milwaukee, WI |
| January 19 | | Providence | W 64–58 | 10–5 | MECCA Arena (10,586); Milwaukee, WI |
| January 21 | | at Western Michigan | W 80–59 | 11–5 | University Arena (2,642); Kalamazoo, MI |
| January 27 | | at Creighton | L 59–71 | 11–6 | Omaha Civic Auditorium (8,165); Omaha, Nebraska |
| February 3 | | at Syracuse | L 53–71 | 11–7 | Carrier Dome (29,020); Syracuse, NY |
| February 5 | | Richmond | W 75–67 | 12–7 | MECCA Arena (10,583); Milwaukee, WI |
| February 10 | | Louisiana | W 72–64 | 13–7 | MECCA Arena (10,511); Milwaukee, WI |
| February 13 | | Xavier | W 71–53 | 14–7 | MECCA Arena (10,643); Milwaukee, WI |
| February 16 | | Dayton | W 61–55 | 15–7 | MECCA Arena (11,052); Milwaukee, WI |
| February 20 | | at Xavier | W 69–60 | 16–7 | Cincinnati Gardens (7,149); Cincinnati, Ohio |
| February 23 | | at Dayton | L 59–72 | 16–8 | UD Arena (13,455); Dayton, Ohio |
| February 27 | | Valparaiso | W 88–46 | 17–8 | MECCA Arena (10,702); Milwaukee, WI |
| March 2 | | at DePaul | L 52–69 | 17–9 | Rosemont Horizon (17,499); Rosemont, Illinois |
| March 6 | | at Notre Dame | L 60–66 | 17–10 | Joyce Center (11,345); South Bend, Indiana |
| March 9 | | DePaul | W 68–64 | 18–10 | MECCA Arena (11,052); Milwaukee, WI |
NIT
| March 14 | | Bradley; First Round | W 77–64 | 19–10 | MECCA Arena (6,871); Milwaukee, WI |
| March 19 | | at Cincinnati; Second Round | W 56–54 | 20–10 | Riverfront Coliseum (10,788); Cincinnati, Ohio |
| March 24 | | at Indiana; Quarterfinals | L 82–94 ^{2OT} | 20–11 | Assembly Hall (16,776); Bloomington, Indiana |
*Non-conference game. ^{#}Rankings from AP Poll. (#) Tournament seedings in parentheses.
