= Maryland Terrapins men's basketball statistical leaders =

Basketball statistical leaders

The Maryland Terrapins men's basketball statistical leaders are individual statistical leaders of the Maryland Terrapins men's basketball program in various categories, including points, three-pointers, assists, blocks, rebounds, and steals. Within those areas, the lists identify single-game, single-season, and career leaders. The Terrapins represent University of Maryland in the NCAA's Big Ten Conference.

Maryland began competing in intercollegiate basketball in 1904. However, the school's record book does not generally list records from before the 1950s, as records from before this period are often incomplete and inconsistent. Since scoring was much lower in this era, and teams played much fewer games during a typical season, it is likely that few or no players from this era would appear on these lists anyway.

The NCAA did not officially record assists as a stat until the 1983–84 season, and blocks and steals until the 1985–86 season, but Maryland's record books includes players in these stats before these seasons. These lists are updated through the end of the 2021–22 season.

== Scoring ==
Career
Rk	Player	Points	Seasons
1	Juan Dixon	2269	1998–99 1999–00 2000–01 2001–02
2	Greivis Vasquez	2171	2006–07 2007–08 2008–09 2009–10
3	Len Bias	2149	1982–83 1983–84 1984–85 1985–86
4	Albert King	2058	1977–78 1978–79 1979–80 1980–81
5	Adrian Branch	2017	1981–82 1982–83 1983–84 1984–85
6	John Lucas II	2015	1972–73 1973–74 1974–75 1975–76
7	Anthony Cowan Jr.	1881	2016–17 2017–18 2018–19 2019–20
8	Lonny Baxter	1858	1998–99 1999–00 2000–01 2001–02
9	Tom McMillen	1807	1971–72 1972–73 1973–74
10	Keith Booth	1776	1993–94 1994–95 1995–96 1996–97

Season
Rk	Player	Points	Season
1	Walt Williams	776	1991–92
2	Len Bias	743	1985–86
3	Juan Dixon	735	2001–02
4	Joe Smith	708	1994–95
5	Len Bias	701	1984–85
6	Terrell Stoglin	690	2011–12
7	Albert King	674	1979–80
8	Adrian Branch	671	1984–85
9	Tom McMillen	667	1971–72
10	Gene Shue	654	1953–54
	Juan Dixon	654	2000–01

Single game
Rk	Player	Points	Season	Opponent
1	Ernest Graham	44	1978–79	NC State
2	Al Bunge	43	1959–60	Yale
	David Coit	43	2025–26	Penn State
4	David Coit	41	2025–26	Mount St. Mary's
	Greivis Vasquez	41	2009–10	Virginia Tech
	Len Bias	41	1985–86	Duke
	Gene Shue	41	1952–53	Washington & Lee
8	Joe Smith	40	1994–95	Duke
	Gene Shue	40	1952–53	Wake Forest
10	Andre Mills	39	2025–26	Northwestern
	Diamond Stone	39	2015–16	Penn State
	Walt Williams	39	1991–92	Wake Forest

== Rebounds ==
Career
Rk	Player	Rebounds	Seasons
1	Len Elmore	1053	1971–72 1972–73 1973–74
2	Julian Reese	1014	2021–22 2022-23 2023–24 2024–25
3	Lonny Baxter	998	1998–99 1999–00 2000–01 2001–02
4	Derrick Lewis	948	1984–85 1985–86 1986–87 1987–88
5	Buck Williams	928	1978–79 1979–80 1980–81
6	Terence Morris	925	1997–98 1998–99 1999–00 2000–01
7	Keith Booth	916	1993–94 1994–95 1995–96 1996–97
8	Larry Gibson	895	1975–76 1976–77 1977–78 1978–79
9	Tom McMillen	859	1971–72 1972–73 1973–74
	Donta Scott	859	2019-20 2020-21 2021–22 2022-23 2023–24

Season
Rk	Player	Rebounds	Season
1	Len Elmore	412	1973–74
2	Jordan Williams	388	2010–11
3	Buck Williams	363	1980–81
4	Joe Smith	362	1994–95
	Bruno Fernando	362	2018–19
6	Len Elmore	351	1971–72
7	Bob Kessler	336	1955–56
8	Jalen Smith	326	2019–20
9	Julian Reese	325	2024–25
10	Buck Williams	323	1978–79
	Derik Queen	323	2024–25

Single game
Rk	Player	Rebounds	Season	Opponent
1	Len Elmore	26	1973–74	Wake Forest
2	Len Elmore	24	1972–73	Kent State
	Will Hetzel	24	1968–69	West Virginia
4	Derrick Lewis	23	1986–87	James Madison
5	Buck Williams	22	1980–81	Louisville
	Buck Williams	22	1978–79	UNLV
	Al Bunge	22	1957–58	Georgetown
	Bob Kessler	22	1955–56	Georgetown
9	Joe Smith	21	1994–95	Texas
	Joe Smith	21	1994–95	Virginia
	Mike Davis	21	1976–77	Pittsburgh
	Len Elmore	21	1973–74	North Carolina
	Len Elmore	21	1973–74	Eastern Kentucky
	Will Hetzel	21	1968–69	Clemson

== Assists ==
Career
Rk	Player	Assists	Seasons
1	Steve Blake	972	1999–00 2000–01 2001–02 2002–03
2	Greivis Vasquez	772	2006–07 2007–08 2008–09 2009–10
3	Keith Gatlin	649	1983–84 1984–85 1985–86 1987–88
4	Terrell Stokes	590	1995–96 1996–97 1997–98 1998–99
5	Anthony Cowan Jr.	584	2016–17 2017–18 2018–19 2019–20
6	John Lucas II	514	1972–73 1973–74 1974–75 1975–76
7	Eric Hayes	513	2006–07 2007–08 2008–09 2009–10
8	Duane Simpkins	483	1992–93 1993–94 1994–95 1995–96
9	Kevin McLinton	469	1989–90 1990–91 1991–92 1992–93
10	Dutch Morley	460	1978–79 1979–80 1980–81 1981–82

Season
Rk	Player	Assists	Season
1	Steve Blake	286	2001–02
2	Steve Blake	248	2000–01
3	Greivis Vasquez	231	2007–08
4	Steve Blake	221	2002–03
	Keith Gatlin	221	1984–85
6	Steve Blake	217	1999–00
7	Terrell Stokes	213	1998–99
8	Greivis Vasquez	208	2009–10
9	Keith Gatlin	204	1985–86
10	John Lucas II	178	1972–73

Single game
Rk	Player	Assists	Season	Opponent
1	Greivis Vasquez	15	2007–08	NC State
	Terrell Stokes	15	1998–99	Western Carolina
3	Steve Blake	14	2001–02	North Carolina
	Terrell Stokes	14	1996–97	Towson State

== Steals ==
Career
Rk	Player	Steals	Seasons
1	Johnny Rhodes	344	1992–93 1993–94 1994–95 1995–96
2	Juan Dixon	333	1998–99 1999–00 2000–01 2001–02
3	Laron Profit	252	1995–96 1996–97 1997–98 1998–99
4	Steve Blake	234	1999–00 2000–01 2001–02 2002–03
5	D. J. Strawberry	202	2003–04 2004–05 2005–06 2006–07
6	Keith Booth	193	1993–94 1994–95 1995–96 1996–97
7	Greivis Vasquez	191	2006–07 2007–08 2008–09 2009–10
8	Terrell Stokes	190	1995–96 1996–97 1997–98 1998–99
9	Walt Williams	175	1988–89 1989–90 1990–91 1991–92
10	Dutch Morley	170	1978–79 1979–80 1980–81 1981–82

Season
Rk	Player	Steals	Season
1	Johnny Rhodes	110	1995–96
2	Juan Dixon	96	1999–00
3	Steve Francis	95	1998–99
	Juan Dixon	95	2000–01
5	Juan Dixon	92	2001–02
6	Laron Profit	87	1997–98
7	Johnny Rhodes	85	1994–95
8	Johnny Rhodes	78	1993–94
9	Steve Blake	71	1999–00
	Johnny Rhodes	71	1992–93

Single game
Rk	Player	Steals	Season	Opponent
1	Johnny Rhodes	9	1995–96	North Carolina
	Johnny Rhodes	9	1995–96	American
3	Juan Dixon	8	2001–02	Florida State
	Juan Dixon	8	2001–02	North Carolina
	Juan Dixon	8	2000–01	Georgia Tech
	Terrell Stokes	8	1998–99	S.C. State
7	Chris McCray	7	2002–03	Wagner
	Juan Dixon	7	2000–01	UMES
	Laron Profit	7	1996–97	Clemson
	Johnny Rhodes	7	1995–96	Virginia
	Johnny Rhodes	7	1995–96	Howard
	Walt Williams	7	1991–92	Mount St. Mary's
	Walt Williams	7	1988–89	North Carolina

== Blocks ==
Career
Rk	Player	Blocks	Seasons
1	Derrick Lewis	339	1984–85 1985–86 1986–87 1987–88
2	Terence Morris	256	1997–98 1998–99 1999–00 2000–01
3	Cedric Lewis	239	1987–88 1988–89 1989–90 1990–91
4	James Gist	231	2004–05 2005–06 2006–07 2007–08
5	Ekene Ibekwe	230	2003–04 2004–05 2005–06 2006–07
6	Lonny Baxter	227	1998–99 1999–00 2000–01 2001–02
7	Joe Smith	190	1993–94 1994–95
8	Julian Reese	179	2021–22 2022-23 2023–24 2024–25
9	Damonte Dodd	141	2013–14 2014–15 2015–16 2016–17
10	Travis Garrison	136	2002–03 2003–04 2004–05 2005–06

Season
Rk	Player	Blocks	Season
1	Cedric Lewis	143	1990–91
2	Derrick Lewis	114	1986–87
3	Derrick Lewis	99	1984–85
4	Joe Smith	97	1994–95
5	Joe Smith	93	1993–94
6	Ekene Ibekwe	88	2006–07
7	Lonny Baxter	79	1999–00
	Terence Morris	79	2000–01
9	Alex Len	78	2012–13
10	Terence Morris	77	1998–99
	James Gist	77	2007–08

Single game
Rk	Player	Blocks	Season	Opponent
1	Cedric Lewis	12	1990–91	South Florida
	Derrick Lewis	12	1986–87	James Madison
3	Derrick Lewis	10	1986–87	UMES
	Derrick Lewis	10	1986–87	UMBC
	Derrick Lewis	10	1984–85	Towson State
	Derrick Lewis	10	1984–85	Tennessee
7	Diamond Stone	8	2015–16	Nebraska
	Ekene Ibekwe	8	2006–07	Mount St. Mary's
	Cedric Lewis	8	1990–91	Georgia Tech
	Cedric Lewis	8	1990–91	UMBC
	Cedric Lewis	8	1990–91	UC Irvine
	Larry Gibson	8	1978–79	St. Joseph's
