= Derrick Lewis (basketball) =

American-French basketball player (born 1966)

Personal information
- Born: August 1, 1966 (age 60) Tarboro, North Carolina
- Listed height: 6 ft 8 in (2.03 m)
- Listed weight: 200 lb (91 kg)

Career information
- High school: Archbishop Carroll (Washington, D.C.)
- College: Maryland (1984–1988)
- NBA draft: 1988: 3rd round, 62nd overall pick
- Drafted by: Chicago Bulls
- Playing career: 1988–2004
- Position: Power forward / center

Career history
- 1988–1989: Rockford Lightning
- 1989–1991: Reims
- 1991: New Haven Skyhawks
- 1991–1992: Reims
- 1992–1993: Saint-Brieuc
- 1993–1994: Mulhouse
- 1994–2001: Nancy
- 2001–2002: Pau-Orthez
- 2002–2004: Le Havre

Career highlights
- French Cup winner (2002); 2× LNB Pro A All-Star (1996, 1998); LNB Pro B blocks leader (1994); 5× LNB Pro A blocks leader (1990, 1991, 1996, 1997, 1998); CBA All-Defensive First Team (1989); AP Honorable mention All-American (1987); First-team All-ACC (1987); Second-team All-ACC (1988); McDonald's All-American (1984); Second-team Parade All-American (1984)
- Stats at Basketball Reference

Derrick Raymond Lewis (born August 1, 1966) is an American-French former professional basketball player. A Tarboro, North Carolina native, he played high school basketball at Archbishop Carroll High School in Washington, D.C., where he was a McDonald's All-American as a senior in 1984. He then played in college with the Maryland Terrapins, staying for 4 years; he was a first-team All-ACC selection and an Honorable mention All-American as a junior in 1987, and a second-team All-ACC selection as a senior in 1988. As of 2020 he is the program's all-time leader in blocks and ranks third in rebounds. He was drafted in the third round of the 1988 NBA draft by the Chicago Bulls (62nd overall), but he did not play in the NBA. After one season in the Continental Basketball Association, Lewis moved to France where he played for 15 seasons, 13 of which in the LNB Pro A, the top level of French basketball, where he was a 5-time blocks leader and a 2-time All-Star.

== High school career ==
Lewis was born in Tarboro, North Carolina to Gertie and Robert Lewis. He attended Archbishop Carroll High School in Washington, D.C., where he was coached by Carroll Holmes and he was a varsity starter since his sophomore season. In his junior season, Lewis averaged 17 points, 11 rebounds and 6 blocks per game, and was selected in the All-Metro First Team by the Washington Post.

As a high school senior, Lewis was ranked among the best players in the nation, with the Knoxville News Sentinel ranking him number 6th overall. He averaged 21 points, 15 rebounds and 8 blocks per game, earning All-Metro MVP and first-team honors, and was selected as the Metro area Mr. Basketball by the Washington Touchdown Club. He also earned recognition at national level, being named a second-team Parade All-American selection, and was selected to play in two high school all-star games: the Capital Classic and the McDonald's All-American Game. In the Capital Classic Lewis he scored 18 points, playing as a center and shooting 9/11 from the field. In the 1984 McDonald's All-American Boys Game he scored 4 points, all on free throws attempts, playing for the East team.

== College career ==
=== Freshman season ===
Lewis chose to wear number 33 at Maryland and was selected as a starter by coach Lefty Driesell since his freshman year. He was considered one of the best defensive freshmen in the country due to his shot blocking ability and dunking. After coming off the bench for the first three games of the season, Driesell made him the starting center of the team: he was only the second freshman to start as a center during Driesell's stint as a coach at Maryland. On November 21, 1984, in a Great Alaska Shootout game against Tennessee, Lewis recorded a career-high 10 blocks; he tied the mark later in the season, posting another 10-block game against Towson State on January 21, 1985. On February 24 he posted a career-high 14 rebounds against Wake Forest. In the quarterfinals of the 1985 ACC men's basketball tournament against Duke, Lewis scored a new career high of 16 points.

During his freshman season Lewis started 34 of 37 games, averaging 6 points, 6.5 rebounds, 0.9 assists and 2.7 blocks per game in 30.1 minutes of playing time. He recorded 99 blocks for the season, which at the time was the single-season all-time high at Maryland. His 241 rebounds made him the 7th best rebounder in the conference. He was named ACC Rookie of the Week twice during the season, and finished second in the ACC Rookie of the Year award voting behind Duane Ferrell of Georgia Tech.

=== Sophomore season ===
Lewis was confirmed as a starter for his sophomore year, and was the only player on the roster to start all 33 games. He scored double figures in 13 games; he tied his career-high of 16 points twice in the season, against Ohio State and Georgia Tech. He also posted a season-high 12 rebounds twice, against Duke and Clemson. His season high in blocks was 7 against North Carolina on February 20, 1986.

During the 1986 NCAA tournament, Lewis recorded a double-double with 13 points and 11 rebounds against Pepperdine, and scored 5 points (with 4 blocks) in the loss against UNLV. During the tournament, Lewis played as a power forward, as the center was Terry Long. He recorded 71 season blocks, and led the team in steals per game with 1.1.

=== Junior season ===
As a junior, Lewis gained an increased scoring load after the departure of Len Bias, who had left the team for the 1986 NBA draft. He was again named the starting center, and the team captain. On January 28, 1987, Lewis recorded a triple double against James Madison with 29 points (a new career high), 23 rebounds (career high) and 12 blocks (another career high, and the best single-game mark in Maryland history). On February 18 he recorded his second triple double (the only player to record more than one in Terrapins history) with 32 points (his career high), 10 rebounds and 10 blocks against UMBC. On February 27 he recorded 10 blocks against Maryland Eastern Shore.

Lewis was the second best scorer in the ACC with 19.6 points per game behind Horace Grant of Clemson (21.0), and was the second best rebounder in the conference with 9.5 per game (again behind Grant who had 9.6). He led his team in scoring, rebounding, blocks, steals and field goal percentage. He recorded 114 total blocks in the season, improving his own record established in his freshman season. He led the ACC in blocks with a 4.4 average, which also ranked him 2nd in the whole NCAA Division I behind David Robinson's 4.5. His 35.8 minutes per game in the season are the 8th best mark in the history of the Terrapins. He earned a selection as the ACC Player of the Week, and at the end of the season he was named in the All-ACC First Team with 182 votes (4th overall in votes behind Horace Grant, Kenny Smith and Joe Wolf), and was selected as an Honorable Mention All-American by the Associated Press. He also finished third in ACC Player of the Year voting with 7 votes, behind Kenny Smith and Horace Grant. He was also among the 10 finalists for the Adolph Rupp Trophy, and received 2 votes.

=== Senior season ===
Lewis was considered one of the college basketball top defensive players when he returned to Maryland for his senior season; Sporting News ranked him the third-best power forward in college basketball behind Danny Manning and J. R. Reid, and included him in the preseason All-American watchlist. He played mostly in the power forward position as a senior, with the center position assigned to Brian Williams and Tony Massenburg. Lewis was named ACC Player of the Week once during the season, starting all 31 games and playing 34.8 minutes per game, the 10th best single-season mark of all time at Maryland. He recorded 55 blocks in the season, reaching a career total of 339. He led his team in points, rebounds, steals and blocks, and ranked third in assists; he also shot 45.5% from three. He ranked 4th in the ACC in rebounding with 7.6 per game. At the end of the season he was selected in the All-ACC Second Team with 69 votes.

Lewis ended his career at Maryland with 1,458 points, 948 rebounds and 339 blocks. As of 2020, he ranks 19th all-time in points, third in rebounds and first in blocks. He also ranks second in career blocks per game average (2.7) behind Joe Smith (3.0). He posted 23 double doubles in his career, and he is the only player in Maryland history with 2 triple doubles.

== Professional career ==
=== Beginnings and rookie season in the CBA ===
After the end of his senior season at Maryland, Lewis was automatically eligible for the 1988 NBA draft. In April 1988 he was selected in the United States Basketball League (USBL) draft in the 6th round (50th overall) by the Jersey Shore Bucs. In May he was invited to the US national team trials to be part of the squad for the 1988 Summer Olympics; he did not make the team. In a June 28 article, the Baltimore Sun reported that Lewis was projected to be a second-round pick in the NBA draft: he was selected in the third round (62nd overall) by the Chicago Bulls. He spent the summer training with the Bulls, and signed a contract on October 7, 1988; however, he was waived on October 25, 10 days before the start of the 1988–89 NBA season. Lewis then decided to sign for the Rockford Lightning in the Continental Basketball Association (CBA), the main minor league in the United States. In his rookie season as a professional player, Lewis played 52 out of 54 games of the 1988–89 CBA season, averaging 8.5 points, 8.5 rebounds, 1.5 assists, 1.1 steals and 2.4 blocks: he ranked third in the CBA in blocks (126 in 52 games for a 2.4 average) behind John Campbell of the La Crosse Catbirds and Jerome Henderson of the Topeka Sizzlers. He also participated in the playoffs, appearing in 16 games and averaging 10.2 points, 8.9 rebounds, 1.6 assists, 1 steal and 1.8 blocks; his team reached the CBA finals, where they lost to the Tulsa Fast Breakers. At the end of the season, Lewis was named in the CBA All-Defensive First Team.

=== First stint in France and USBL ===
In 1989, Lewis moved to France for the first time in his career, and signed for Reims Champagne Basket, a team that competed in the Nationale A1, the first level of French basketball. In his first season in the league, Lewis led the league in blocks at 3.1 per game, and also averaged 15.6 points, 8.1 rebounds and 2.4 steals per game in 34.9 minutes of playing time. On February 24, 1990, he recorded the only quadruple double in French league history against Lorient, with 20 points, 11 rebounds, 12 steals and 10 blocks. In that game he also established records for most blocks (10) and steals (12) in a single game. He stayed with Reims for the following season where he played 11 games, with averages of 14 points, 10.1 rebounds, 1.2 assists, 1.5 steals and 2.7 blocks, again leading the league in blocks. In the spring of 1991, after the end of the 1990–91 Nationale A1 season, he left France and returned to the United States, signing for the New Haven Skyhawks of the USBL, playing the 1991 season with the team.

=== Return to France and Pro B ===
In late 1991 Lewis returned to France and played 5 games with Reims, averaging 13 points, 6.6 rebounds, 3 assists, 1 steal and 3.4 blocks per game in 35.8 minutes of playing time. For the 1992–93 season he signed with Saint-Brieuc, a team that competed in the Nationale A2, the second tier of basketball in France. In 23 games he averaged career-highs in points (19.7), rebounds (10.6), field goal percentage (60.2%) and free throw percentage (88.4%); he also improved his three-point shooting, recording his first season shooting at least 30% from the three-point line (34.3%). He signed with Mulhouse for the 1993–94 season in the Pro B (the new name of Nationale A2). In 34 games he averaged 17.6 points, 9.1 rebounds, 1.5 assists, 2.4 steals and 3.6 blocks: he posted career highs in steals and blocks per game, and lead the Pro B in blocks. Mulhouse ended the Pro B season in third place, just shy of promotion in Pro A.

=== Seven seasons with Nancy ===
In the summer of 1994 Lewis signed with Nancy in the Pro A. In his first season with the club, Lewis averaged 16.7 points, 10 rebounds, 1.5 assists and 3 blocks, while playing a career-best 38.3 minutes per game and shooting 51.1% from three (made 24 out of 47 total attempts). Despite Lewis' performances, Nancy ended 13th out of 14 teams in the Pro A, barely avoiding relegation. In the following season, Lewis averaged 16.3 points, 8.4 rebounds, 2.7 assists, 2.2 steals and 2.1 blocks per game, leading the league in blocks for the third time in his career. Nancy improved and ended 8th in the league standings, qualifying to the playoffs where they lost to Pau-Orthez.

Lewis played 21 games in the 1996–97 season, averaging 15.1 points, 8.8 rebounds (5th in the league), 1.4 steals (11th in the league) and 1.9 blocks, once again leading the league in blocks. Nancy qualified for the playoffs, where they lost to Pau-Orthez for the second consecutive season. In the 1997–98 season Lewis appeared in 30 games, and averaged 10.1 points, 8.6 rebounds (second in the Pro A behind Keith Hill of Dijon), a career-high 3.8 assists, 1.6 steals (11th in the league) and led the league in blocks for the 5th time in his career with 2.2 per game.

In the 1998–99 season Lewis averaged 9.4 points (his first time in single digits in France), 7.1 rebounds (6th in the league), 2.7 assists, 1.6 steals and 1.1 blocks (6th in the league in steals and blocks) over 29 games. For the following season Lewis played 21 games, averaging 9 points, 6.7 rebounds (10th in the Pro A), 2.1 assists, 1.7 steals (6th in the league) and 0.9 blocks (7th). In his last season with Nancy he appeared in 30 games and averaged 10 points, 8.6 rebounds (7th in the league), 2.8 assists and 1.4 blocks (4th). Nancy qualified for the playoffs, where they lost to Le Mans.

=== Pau-Orthez: cup winner and Euroleague ===
In 2001 Lewis signed with Pau-Orthez, the team that had won the league title the previous season and was due to participate in the 2001–02 Euroleague. Lewis played 26 games in the Pro A with Pau-Orthez, receiving limited playing time (17.7 minutes) and averaging career-lows in points (5.9), rebounds (4.3), assists (1.1) and blocks (0.3). He also appeared in 12 Euroleague games, playing 13 minutes per game with averages of 3.3 points, 2.1 rebounds, 0.7 assists and 0.9 steals. Lewis was also part of the roster that won the 2001–02 French Basketball Cup.

=== Final two seasons with Le Havre ===
Lewis signed with Le Havre in 2002 and he was selected as a starter. He played 28.3 minutes per game and averaged 10.1 points, 6.4 rebounds, 1.9 assists, 1.2 steals and 0.7 blocks, ranking 15th in the league in rebounds. He played his final season as a professional in 2003–04, starting 11 out of 34 games and posting averages of 8.3 points, 4.9 rebounds, 1.5 assists and 0.8 steals per game. He scored a total of 3,773 points, 2,443 rebounds, 715 assists and 533 blocks in the Pro A.

== Career statistics ==
=== Domestic leagues ===
Season	Team	League	GP	GS	MPG	FG%	3P%	FT%	RPG	APG	SPG	BPG	PPG
1988–89	Rockford Lightning	CBA	52	–	30.0	.510	.286	.726	8.5	1.5	1.1	2.4	8.5
1989–90	Reims	NA1	34	–	34.9	.563	.259	.752	8.1	1.1	2.4	3.1	15.6
1990–91	Reims	NA1	11	–	32.6	.584	.286	.696	10.1	1.2	1.5	2.7	14.0
1991	New Haven Skyhawks	USBL	No data available										
1991–92	Reims	NA1	5	–	35.8	.545	.167	.789	6.6	3.0	1.0	3.4	13.0
1992–93	Saint-Brieuc	NA2	23	–	37.3	.602	.343	.884	10.6	2.8	1.9	2.1	19.7
1993–94	Mulhouse	Pro B	34	–	34.1	.560	.427	.803	9.1	1.5	2.4	3.6	17.6
1994–95	Nancy	Pro A	26	–	38.3	.559	.511	.790	10.0	1.5	1.2	3.0	16.7
1995–96	Nancy	Pro A	29	–	37.3	.596	.395	.861	8.4	2.7	2.2	2.1	16.3
1996–97	Nancy	Pro A	21	–	37.5	.561	.492	.724	8.8	3.3	1.4	1.9	15.1
1997–98	Nancy	Pro A	30	–	36.3	.490	.395	.833	8.6	3.8	1.6	2.2	10.1
1998–99	Nancy	Pro A	29	–	33.4	.487	.350	.707	7.1	2.7	1.6	1.1	9.4
1999–00	Nancy	Pro A	21	–	34.8	.459	.400	.835	6.7	2.1	1.7	0.9	9.0
2000–01	Nancy	Pro A	30	–	33.8	.488	.370	.811	8.6	2.8	1.7	1.4	10.0
2001–02	Pau-Orthez	Pro A	26	–	17.7	.486	.376	.759	4.3	1.1	1.0	0.3	5.9
2002–03	Le Havre	Pro A	30	29	28.3	.542	.347	.806	6.4	1.9	1.2	0.7	10.1
2003–04	Le Havre	Pro A	34	11	23.3	.490	.456	.753	4.9	1.5	0.8	0.6	8.3

=== Euroleague ===
Year	Team	GP	GS	MPG	FG%	3P%	FT%	RPG	APG	SPG	BPG	PPG	PIR
2001–02	Pau-Orthez	12	–	13.0	.350	.267	.727	2.1	0.7	0.9	0.3	3.3	4.5

=== College ===
Year	Team	GP	GS	MPG	FG%	3P%	FT%	RPG	APG	SPG	BPG	PPG
1984–85	Maryland	37	34	30.1	.466	—	.625	6.5	0.9	0.5	2.7	6.0
1985–86	Maryland	33	33	32.7	.485	—	.684	6.7	0.8	1.1	2.2	7.9
1986–87	Maryland	26	26	35.8	.602	.200	.672	9.5	1.9	1.5	4.4	19.6
1987–88	Maryland	31	31	34.8	.556	.455	.593	7.6	2.3	1.5	1.8	15.0
Career		127	124	33.1	.540	.421	.645	7.5	1.4	1.1	2.7	11.5
