= 1984–85 SMU Mustangs men's basketball team =

American college basketball season

1984–85 SMU Mustangs men's basketball

NCAA tournament, Second Round, L 57–70 vs. Loyola (IL)
- Conference: Southwest Conference
- Record: 23–10 (10–6 SWC)
- Head coach: Dave Bliss (5th season)
- Assistant coaches: Doug Ash; Paul Graham; John Underwood
- Home arena: Moody Coliseum

1984–85 Southwest Conference men's basketball standings
	Conf.				Overall
Team	W		L	PCT	W		L	PCT
No. 17 Texas Tech †	12	–	4	.750	23	–	8	.742
SMU	10	–	6	.625	23	–	10	.697
Texas A&M	10	–	6	.625	19	–	11	.633
Arkansas	10	–	6	.625	22	–	13	.629
TCU	8	–	8	.500	16	–	12	.571
Houston	8	–	8	.500	16	–	14	.533
Texas	7	–	9	.438	15	–	13	.536
Baylor	4	–	12	.250	11	–	17	.393
Rice	3	–	13	.188	11	–	16	.407
† 1985 SWC tournament winner Rankings from AP Poll

The 1984–85 SMU Mustangs men's basketball team represented Southern Methodist University during the 1984–85 men's college basketball season. There, they defeated Old Dominion to advance to the Second Round. In the Second Round, they lost to the #4 seed Loyola (IL), 70–57.

== Roster ==
1984–85 SMU Mustangs men's basketball team
Players
Coaches

Pos.	#	Name	Height	Weight	Year	Previous school	Hometown
G/F	44	Carl Wright	6 ft 5 in (1.96 m)	—	Sr
C	53	Jon Koncak	7 ft 0 in (2.13 m)	240 lb (109 kg)	Sr	Center	Kansas City, Missouri

Head coach

- Dave Bliss (Cornell)

Assistant coach(es)

- Paul Graham (North Texas)

Legend

- (C) Team captain
- (S) Suspended
- (I) Ineligible
- (W) Walk-on
- Injured
- Current redshirt

Roster

== Schedule ==
Date time, TV	Rank^{#}	Opponent^{#}	Result	Record	Site city, state
November 23*		Texas Southern	W 91–72	1–0	Moody Coliseum; University Park, Texas
December 1*		NW Louisiana	W 89–57	2–0	Moody Coliseum; University Park, Texas
December 4*	No. 8	at Kentucky	W 56–54	3–0	Rupp Arena; Lexington, Kentucky
December 8*		Centenary	W 97–79	4–0	Moody Coliseum; University Park, Texas
December 14*		Idaho	W 90–71	5–0	Moody Coliseum; University Park, Texas
December 15*		Oklahoma State	W 82–65	6–0	Moody Coliseum; University Park, Texas
December 17*		Campbell	W 90–70	7–0	Moody Coliseum; University Park, Texas
December 19*		North Texas	W 90–45	8–0	Moody Coliseum; University Park, Texas
December 22*	No. 6	vs. Oklahoma	W 85–76	9–0	Neal S. Blaisdell Center; Honolulu, Hawaii
December 25*		at Chaminade	L 70–71	9–1	Neal S. Blaisdell Center; Honolulu, Hawaii
January 2		at Rice	W 66–57	9–1 (1–0)	Tudor Fieldhouse; Houston, Texas
January 5	No. 7	Arkansas	W 63–60	10–1 (2–0)	Moody Coliseum; University Park, Texas
January 9		Baylor	W 95–63	11–1 (3–0)	Moody Coliseum; University Park, Texas
January 11		at Texas A&M	W 73–60	12–1 (4–0)	G. Rollie White Coliseum; College Station, Texas
January 13*		vs. North Carolina	W 84–82	13–1 (4–0)	
January 19		TCU	W 74–70	14–1 (5–0)	Moody Coliseum; University Park, Texas
January 23		at Texas	W 54–46	15–1 (6–0)	Frank Erwin Center; Austin, Texas
January 26		at Texas Tech	L 63–64	15–2 (6–1)	Lubbock Municipal Coliseum; Lubbock, Texas
January 30		Houston	W 85–78	16–2 (7–1)	Moody Coliseum; University Park, Texas
February 3		Rice	W 68–52	17–2 (8–1)	Moody Coliseum; University Park, Texas
February 6	No. 4	at Arkansas	L 66–69	17–3 (8–2)	Barnhill Arena; Fayetteville, Arkansas
February 9*	No. 4	at North Carolina State	L 78–82	17–4 (8–2)	Reynolds Coliseum; Raleigh, North Carolina
February 11		at Baylor	L 90–94	17–5 (8–3)	Extraco Events Center; Waco, Texas
February 13		Texas A&M	W 81–79	18–5 (9–3)	Moody Coliseum; University Park, Texas
February 16*		Louisville	W 72–64	19–5 (9–3)	Moody Coliseum; University Park, Texas
February 20		at TCU	W 72–64	19–5 (9–3)	Daniel-Meyer Coliseum; Fort Worth, Texas
February 23		Texas	W 64–60	20–5 (10–3)	Moody Coliseum; University Park, Texas
February 27		Texas Tech	L 54–59	20–6 (10–4)	Moody Coliseum; University Park, Texas
March 3		at Houston	L 76–79	20–7 (10–5)	Hofheinz Pavilion; Houston, Texas
Southwest tournament
March 8	(3)	vs. (6) Houston; Quarterfinals	W 84–72	21–7 (10–5)	Reunion Arena; Dallas, Texas
March 9	(3) No. 20	vs. (2) Arkansas; Seminfinals	L 55–68	21–8 (10–5)	Reunion Arena; Dallas, Texas
1985 NCAA tournament
March 14*	(5 E)	vs. (12 E) Old Dominion; First Round	W 85–68	22–8 (10–5)	Hartford Civic Center; Hartford, Connecticut
March 16*	(5 E)	vs. (4 E) No. 14 Loyola (IL); Second Round	L 57–70	22–9 (10–5)	Hartford Civic Center (14,897); Hartford, Connecticut
*Non-conference game. ^{#}Rankings from AP Poll. (#) Tournament seedings in parentheses. E=East. All times are in Central Time.

== Team players drafted into the NBA ==
Round	Pick	Player	NBA Club
1	5	Jon Koncak	Atlanta Hawks
5	113	Carl Wright	Philadelphia 76ers
