= Eric Boyd =

Eric Boyd may refer to the following people:

- Eric DeWayne Boyd, one of the perpetrators in the murders of Channon Christian and Christopher Newsom
- Eric L. Boyd, American software engineer
- Eric Boyd (basketball), member of the 1984–85 North Carolina A&T Aggies men's basketball team
- Eric Boyd, a boy killed by a stray bullet at the St. Thomas Development in New Orleans, LA in 1992
- Eric Boyd, co-founder of the web search engine StumbleUpon
