= 1984–85 Georgia Tech Yellow Jackets men's basketball team =

American college basketball season

1984–85 Georgia Tech Yellow Jackets men's basketball

ACC tournament champions ACC regular season co-champions Rainbow Classic Champions

NCAA tournament, Elite Eight
- Conference: Atlantic Coast Conference

Ranking
- Coaches: No. 6
- AP: No. 6
- Record: 27–8 (9–5 ACC)
- Head coach: Bobby Cremins (4th season)
- Assistant coaches: George Felton (4th season); Perry Clark (3rd season); Jimmy Hebron (4th season); Rich Brown (1st season)
- Home arena: Alexander Memorial Coliseum

1984–85 ACC men's basketball standings
	Conf.				Overall
Team	W		L	PCT	W		L	PCT
No. 6 Georgia Tech †	9	–	5	.643	27	–	8	.771
No. 7 North Carolina	9	–	5	.643	27	–	9	.750
No. 16 NC State	9	–	5	.643	23	–	10	.697
No. 10 Duke	8	–	6	.571	23	–	8	.742
Maryland	8	–	6	.571	25	–	12	.676
Clemson	5	–	9	.357	16	–	13	.552
Wake Forest	5	–	9	.357	15	–	14	.517
Virginia	3	–	11	.214	17	–	16	.515
† 1985 ACC tournament winner Rankings from AP Poll

The 1984-85 Georgia Tech Yellow Jackets men's basketball team represented the Georgia Institute of Technology during the 1984–85 NCAA Division I men's basketball season. Led by head coach Bobby Cremins, the team finished the season with an overall record of 27-8 (9-5 ACC). The team earned a share of the ACC regular season title, won the ACC tournament, and reached the East Regional final of the NCAA tournament before falling to Georgetown, 60–54.

== Roster ==
1984–85 Georgia Tech Yellow Jackets men's basketball team
Players
Coaches

Pos.	#	Name	Height	Weight	Year	Hometown
G	10	Craig Neal	6 ft 4 in (1.93 m)	165 lb (75 kg)	Fr	Washington, Indiana
C	22	John Salley	6 ft 11 in (2.11 m)	230 lb (104 kg)	Jr	Brooklyn, New York
F	24	Scott Petway	6 ft 6 in (1.98 m)	—	Sr
G	25	Mark Price	6 ft 0 in (1.83 m)	170 lb (77 kg)	Jr	Enid, Oklahoma
G	33	Duane Ferrell	6 ft 7 in (2.01 m)	205 lb (93 kg)	Fr	Baltimore, Maryland
G	45	Bruce Dalrymple	6 ft 4 in (1.93 m)	210 lb (95 kg)	So	Manhattan, New York
C	54	Yvon Joseph	6 ft 11 in (2.11 m)	245 lb (111 kg)	Sr	Cap-Haïtien, Haiti

Head coach

- Bobby Cremins (South Carolina)

Assistant coach(es)

- George Felton (South Carolina)
- Perry Clark (Gettysburg)
- Jimmy Hebron
- Rich Brown

Legend

- (C) Team captain
- (S) Suspended
- (I) Ineligible
- (W) Walk-on
- Injured
- Current redshirt

== Schedule and results ==
Date time, TV	Rank^{#}	Opponent^{#}	Result	Record	Site city, state
Regular season
Nov 24, 1984*	No. 20	Charleston Southern	W 79–66	1–0	Alexander Memorial Coliseum; Atlanta, Georgia
Nov 27, 1984*	No. 18	Chattanooga	W 74–58	2–0	Alexander Memorial Coliseum; Atlanta, Georgia
Nov 30, 1984*	No. 18	Tennessee Tech	W 96–78	3–0	Alexander Memorial Coliseum; Atlanta, Georgia
Dec 11, 1984*	No. 12	Georgia	L 59–60	3–1	Alexander Memorial Coliseum; Atlanta, Georgia
Dec 15, 1984	No. 12	at No. 9 NC State	W 66–64	4–1 (1–0)	Reynolds Coliseum; Raleigh, North Carolina
Dec 18, 1984*	No. 13	North Carolina A&T	W 81–43	5–1	Alexander Memorial Coliseum; Atlanta, Georgia
Dec 21, 1984*	No. 13	Augusta State	W 84–53	6–1	Alexander Memorial Coliseum; Atlanta, Georgia
Dec 25, 1984*	No. 10	vs. Arkansas; Rainbow Classic	W 72–52	7–1	Neal S. Blaisdell Center; Honolulu, Hawaii
Dec 26, 1984*	No. 10	vs. No. 11 Washington; Rainbow Classic	W 65–58	8–1	Neal S. Blaisdell Center; Honolulu, Hawaii
Dec 27, 1984*	No. 10	vs. Maryland; Rainbow Classic	W 70–69	9–1	Neal S. Blaisdell Center; Honolulu, Hawaii
Jan 3, 1985*	No. 8	Maryland-Eastern Shore	W 93–40	10–1	Alexander Memorial Coliseum; Atlanta, Georgia
Jan 5, 1985	No. 8	at Wake Forest	L 54–68	10–2 (1–1)	Winston-Salem Memorial Coliseum; Winston-Salem, North Carolina
Jan 8, 1985	No. 9	Clemson	L 81–90	10–3 (1–2)	Alexander Memorial Coliseum; Atlanta, Georgia
Jan 14, 1985*	No. 17	at UNC Charlotte	W 86–68	11–3	Charlotte Coliseum; Charlotte, North Carolina
Jan 17, 1985*	No. 17	Monmouth	W 96–66	12–3	Alexander Memorial Coliseum; Atlanta, Georgia
Jan 21, 1985	No. 16	Virginia	W 49–46	13–3 (2–2)	Alexander Memorial Coliseum; Atlanta, Georgia
Jan 23, 1985	No. 16	at Clemson	W 64–59	14–3 (3–2)	Littlejohn Coliseum; Clemson, South Carolina
Jan 27, 1985	No. 16	at No. 8 North Carolina	W 66–62	15–3 (4–2)	Carmichael Auditorium; Chapel Hill, North Carolina
Jan 30, 1985	No. 8	NC State	L 53–61	15–4 (5–2)	Alexander Memorial Coliseum; Atlanta, Georgia
Feb 2, 1985	No. 8	at No. 17 Maryland	W 72–60	16–4 (6–2)	Cole Fieldhouse; College Park, Maryland
Feb 6, 1985; 7:30 p.m.	No. 10	No. 5 Duke	W 81–71	17–4 (7–2)	Alexander Memorial Coliseum (7,366); Atlanta, Georgia
Feb 10, 1985	No. 10	Wake Forest	W 94–75	18–4 (8–2)	Alexander Memorial Coliseum; Atlanta, Georgia
Feb 16, 1985	No. 6	at Virginia	L 55–62	18–5 (8–3)	University Hall; Charlottesville, Virginia
Feb 19, 1985	No. 8	No. 20 Maryland	W 48–43	19–5 (9–3)	Alexander Memorial Coliseum; Atlanta, Georgia
Feb 23, 1985; 1:30 p.m.	No. 8	at No. 6 Duke	L 62–67	19–6 (9–4)	Cameron Indoor Stadium (8,564); Durham, North Carolina
Feb 26, 1985	No. 10	vs. No. 8 North Carolina	W 57–54	20–6 (9–5)	Omni Coliseum; Atlanta, Georgia
Mar 2, 1985*	No. 10	Saint Louis	W 64–54	21–6	Alexander Memorial Coliseum; Atlanta, Georgia
Mar 3, 1985*	No. 10	at No. 6 Oklahoma	L 80–87	21–7	Lloyd Noble Center; Norman, Oklahoma
ACC Tournament
Mar 8, 1985*	(1) No. 9	vs. (8) Virginia; Quarterfinals	W 55–48	22–7	Omni Coliseum; Atlanta, Georgia
Mar 9, 1985*	(1) No. 9	vs. (4) No. 7 Duke; Semifinals	W 75–64	23–7	Omni Coliseum (16,723); Atlanta, Georgia
Mar 10, 1985*	(1) No. 9	vs. (2) No. 6 North Carolina; Championship Game	W 67–62	24–7	Omni Coliseum; Atlanta, Georgia
NCAA Tournament
Mar 15, 1985*; CBS	(2 E) No. 6	vs. (15 E) Mercer; First Round	W 65–58	25–7	Omni Coliseum; Atlanta, GA
Mar 17, 1985*; CBS	(2 E) No. 6	vs. (7 E) No. 15 Syracuse; Second Round	W 70–53	26–7	Omni Coliseum; Atlanta, GA
Mar 21, 1985*; CBS	(2 E) No. 6	vs. (3 E) No. 12 Illinois; East Regional semifinal	W 61–53	27–7	Providence Civic Center (11,913); Providence, RI
Mar 23, 1985*; CBS	(2 E) No. 6	vs. (1 E) No. 1 Georgetown; East Regional final	L 54–60	27–8	Providence Civic Center (11,913); Providence, RI
*Non-conference game. ^{#}Rankings from AP Poll. (#) Tournament seedings in parentheses. E=East. All times are in Eastern Time.

== Rankings ==
Ranking movements Legend: ██ Increase in ranking ██ Decrease in ranking — = Not ranked
	Week																
Poll	Pre	1	2	3	4	5	6	7	8	9	10	11	12	13	14	15	Final
AP	20	18	15	12	13	10	8	9	17	16	8	10	6	8	10	9	6
Coaches	Not released	—	14	14	13	13	7	10	15	17	9	7	5	9	13	11	6
