= 1984–85 NC State Wolfpack men's basketball team =

American college basketball season

1984–85 NC State Wolfpack men's basketball

ACC Regular season co-champions

NCAA tournament, Elite 8
- Conference: Atlantic Coast Conference

Ranking
- Coaches: No. 18
- AP: No. 16
- Record: 23–10 (9–5 ACC)
- Head coach: Jim Valvano (5th season)
- Assistant coaches: Ray Martin (5th season); Tom Abatemarco (3rd season); Ed McLean (3rd season)
- Home arena: Reynolds Coliseum

1984–85 ACC men's basketball standings
	Conf.				Overall
Team	W		L	PCT	W		L	PCT
No. 6 Georgia Tech †	9	–	5	.643	27	–	8	.771
No. 7 North Carolina	9	–	5	.643	27	–	9	.750
No. 16 NC State	9	–	5	.643	23	–	10	.697
No. 10 Duke	8	–	6	.571	23	–	8	.742
Maryland	8	–	6	.571	25	–	12	.676
Clemson	5	–	9	.357	16	–	13	.552
Wake Forest	5	–	9	.357	15	–	14	.517
Virginia	3	–	11	.214	17	–	16	.515
† 1985 ACC tournament winner Rankings from AP Poll

The 1984–85 NC State Wolfpack men's basketball team represented North Carolina State University during the 1984–85 men's college basketball season. It was Jim Valvano's fifth season as head coach.

Two years after cutting down the nets in Albuquerque as NCAA champions, the Wolfpack returned to "The Pit" for first and second round action as No. 3 seed in the West region. NC State reached the Elite Eight before falling to St. John's, 75–67.

== Roster ==
1984–85 NC State Wolfpack men's basketball team
Players
Coaches

Pos.	#	Name	Height	Weight	Year	Hometown
G	4	Spud Webb	5 ft 7 in (1.7 m)	130 lb (59 kg)	Sr	Dallas, Texas
G	10	Nate McMillan	6 ft 5 in (1.96 m)	185 lb (84 kg)	Jr	Raleigh, North Carolina
G	14	Vinny Del Negro	6 ft 4 in (1.93 m)	180 lb (82 kg)	Fr	Springfield, Massachusetts
F	23	Bennie Bolton	6 ft 8 in (2.03 m)	—	So
G	24	Terry Gannon	6 ft 1 in (1.85 m)	165 lb (75 kg)	Sr	Joliet, Illinois
G	31	Ernie Myers	6 ft 4 in (1.93 m)	203 lb (92 kg)	Jr	Manhattan, New York
F	33	Charles Shackleford	6 ft 10 in (2.08 m)	220 lb (100 kg)	Fr	Kinston, North Carolina
F	43	Lorenzo Charles	6 ft 7 in (2.01 m)	220 lb (100 kg)	Sr	Brooklyn, New York
F	45	Cozell McQueen	6 ft 11 in (2.11 m)	230 lb (104 kg)	Sr	Bennettsville, South Carolina
C	50	Chris Washburn	6 ft 11 in (2.11 m)	225 lb (102 kg)	Fr	Hickory, North Carolina

Head coach

- Jim Valvano (Rutgers)

Assistant coach(es)

- Ray Martin (Notre Dame)
- Tom Abatemarco (Dowling)
- Ed McLean (Western Carolina)

Legend

- (C) Team captain
- (S) Suspended
- (I) Ineligible
- (W) Walk-on
- Injured
- Current redshirt

== Schedule ==
Date time, TV	Rank^{#}	Opponent^{#}	Result	Record	Site city, state
Regular season
Nov 24, 1984*	No. 13	Campbell	W 94–54	1–0	Reynolds Coliseum; Raleigh, NC
Nov 26, 1984*	No. 13	UC Santa Barbara	W 93–70	2–0	Reynolds Coliseum; Raleigh, NC
Dec 3, 1984*	No. 10	Hartford	W 83–46	3–0	Reynolds Coliseum; Raleigh, NC
Dec 5, 1984*	No. 10	North Carolina A&T	W 101–54	4–0	Reynolds Coliseum; Raleigh, NC
Dec 8, 1984*	No. 10	Western Carolina	W 103–67	5–0	Reynolds Coliseum; Raleigh, NC
Dec 15, 1984	No. 9	No. 12 Georgia Tech	L 64–66	5–1 (0–1)	Reynolds Coliseum; Raleigh, NC
Dec 19, 1984*	No. 14	Saint Francis (PA)	W 82–64	6–1	Reynolds Coliseum; Raleigh, NC
Dec 27, 1984*	No. 14	vs. Rutgers; ECAC Holiday Festival Championship	W 80–68	7–1	Madison Square Garden; New York, NY
Dec 29, 1984*	No. 14	at No. 5 St. John's; ECAC Holiday Festival Championship	L 56–66	7–2	Madison Square Garden; New York, NY
Jan 2, 1985	No. 17	at No. 19 Maryland	L 56–58	7–3 (0–2)	Cole Fieldhouse; College Park, MD
Jan 5, 1985*	No. 17	at Kentucky	L 62–78	7–4	Rupp Arena; Lexington, KY
Jan 8, 1985		Virginia	W 51–45	8–4 (1–2)	Reynolds Coliseum; Raleigh, NC
Jan 10, 1985		at Clemson	W 71–68	9–4 (2–2)	Littlejohn Coliseum; Clemson, SC
Jan 16, 1985		at No. 6 North Carolina	L 76–86	9–5 (2–3)	Carmichael Auditorium; Chapel Hill, NC
Jan 19, 1985*		Florida State	W 72–66	10–5	Reynolds Coliseum; Raleigh, NC
Jan 23, 1985*		No. 5 Duke	W 89–71	11–5 (3–3)	Reynolds Coliseum (12,400); Raleigh, NC
Jan 26, 1985*		at Louisville	L 78–84	11–6	Freedom Hall; Louisville, KY
Jan 30, 1985		at No. 8 Georgia Tech	W 61–53	12–6 (4–3)	Alexander Memorial Coliseum; Atlanta, GA
Feb 2, 1985		at Wake Forest	L 64–91	12–7 (4–4)	Winston-Salem Memorial Coliseum; Winston-Salem, NC
Feb 6, 1985		Clemson	W 69–57	13–7 (5–4)	Reynolds Coliseum; Raleigh, NC
Feb 9, 1985*		No. 4 Southern Methodist	W 82–78	14–7	Reynolds Coliseum; Raleigh, NC
Feb 13, 1985*		Maryland-Eastern Shore	W 90–51	15–7	Reynolds Coliseum; Raleigh, NC
Feb 16, 1985		No. 13 North Carolina	W 85–76	16–7 (6–4)	Reynolds Coliseum; Raleigh, NC
Feb 20, 1985		at No. 6 Duke	W 70–66	17–7 (7–4)	Cameron Indoor Stadium (8,564); Durham, NC
Feb 24, 1985		at Virginia	W 57–55	18–7 (8–4)	University Hall; Charlottesville, VA
Feb 27, 1985	No. 16	Maryland	L 70–71	18–8 (8–5)	Reynolds Coliseum; Raleigh, NC
Mar 2, 1985	No. 16	Wake Forest	W 66–64	19–8 (9–5)	Reynolds Coliseum; Raleigh, NC
ACC Tournament
March 8*	(3) No. 18	vs. (6) Clemson; Quarterfinals	W 70–63	20–8	Omni Coliseum; Atlanta, GA
March 9*	(3) No. 18	vs. (2) No. 6 North Carolina; Semifinals	L 51–57	20–9	Omni Coliseum; Atlanta, GA
NCAA Tournament
March 15*; CBS	(3 W) No. 16	vs. (14 W) Nevada; First Round	W 65–56	21–9	The Pit; Albuquerque, NM
March 17*; CBS	(3 W) No. 16	vs. (11 W) UTEP; Second Round	W 86–73	22–9	The Pit (13,833); Albuquerque, NM
March 22*; CBS	(3 W) No. 16	vs. (7 W) Alabama; West Regional semifinal	W 61–55	23–9	McNichols Sports Arena (17,022); Denver, CO
March 24*; CBS	(3 W) No. 16	vs. (1 W) No. 3 St. John's; West Regional final	L 67–75	23–10	McNichols Sports Arena (17,022); Denver, CO
*Non-conference game. ^{#}Rankings from AP Poll. (#) Tournament seedings in parentheses. W=West. All times are in Eastern Time.

== Rankings ==
Ranking movements Legend: ██ Increase in ranking ██ Decrease in ranking — = Not ranked
	Week																	
Poll	Pre	1	2	3	4	5	6	7	8	9	10	11	12	13	14	15	16	Final
AP	13	11	10	9	14	14	17	—	—	—	—	—	—	—	—	16	18	16
Coaches	Not released	12	10	8	17	—	—	—	—	—	—	—	—	—	—	19	17	18
