= 1985 Southwest Conference men's basketball tournament =

- Classification: Division I
- Season: 1984–85
- Teams: 8
- Site: Reunion Arena; Dallas, Texas
- Champions: Texas Tech (2nd title)
- Winning coach: Gerald Myers (2nd title)
- MVP: Joe Kleine (Arkansas)

1984–85 Southwest Conference men's basketball standings
	Conf.				Overall
Team	W		L	PCT	W		L	PCT
No. 17 Texas Tech †	12	–	4	.750	23	–	8	.742
SMU	10	–	6	.625	23	–	10	.697
Texas A&M	10	–	6	.625	19	–	11	.633
Arkansas	10	–	6	.625	22	–	13	.629
TCU	8	–	8	.500	16	–	12	.571
Houston	8	–	8	.500	16	–	14	.533
Texas	7	–	9	.438	15	–	13	.536
Baylor	4	–	12	.250	11	–	17	.393
Rice	3	–	13	.188	11	–	16	.407
† 1985 SWC tournament winner Rankings from AP Poll

The 1985 Southwest Conference men's basketball tournament was held March 8–10, 1985, at Reunion Arena in Dallas, Texas.

Number 1 seed Texas Tech defeated 2 seed Arkansas 67-64 to win their 2nd championship and receive the conference's automatic bid to the 1985 NCAA tournament.

== Format and seeding ==
The tournament consisted of the top 8 teams playing in a single-elimination tournament.

Place	Seed	Team	Conference			Overall		
Place	Seed	Team	W	L	%	W	L	%
1	1	Texas Tech	12	4	.750	23	8	.742
2	2	Arkansas	10	6	.625	22	13	.629
2	3	SMU	10	6	.625	23	10	.697
2	4	Texas A&M	10	6	.625	19	11	.633
5	5	TCU	8	8	.500	16	12	.571
5	6	Houston	8	8	.500	16	14	.533
7	7	Texas	7	9	.438	15	13	.536
8	8	Baylor	4	12	.250	11	17	.393
9	-	Rice	3	13	.188	11	16	.407

== Tournament ==
Quarterfinals; Friday, March 8
1	Texas Tech	83
8	Baylor	76
4	Texas A&M	54
5	TCU	53
3	20 SMU	84
6	Houston	72
2	Arkansas	66
7	Texas	46

Semifinals; Saturday, March 9
1	Texas Tech	72
4	Texas A&M	63
3	20 SMU	55
2	Arkansas	68

Finals; Sunday, March 10
1	Texas Tech	67
2	Arkansas	64
