= 1984–85 Houston Cougars men's basketball team =

American college basketball season

1984–85 Houston Cougars men's basketball
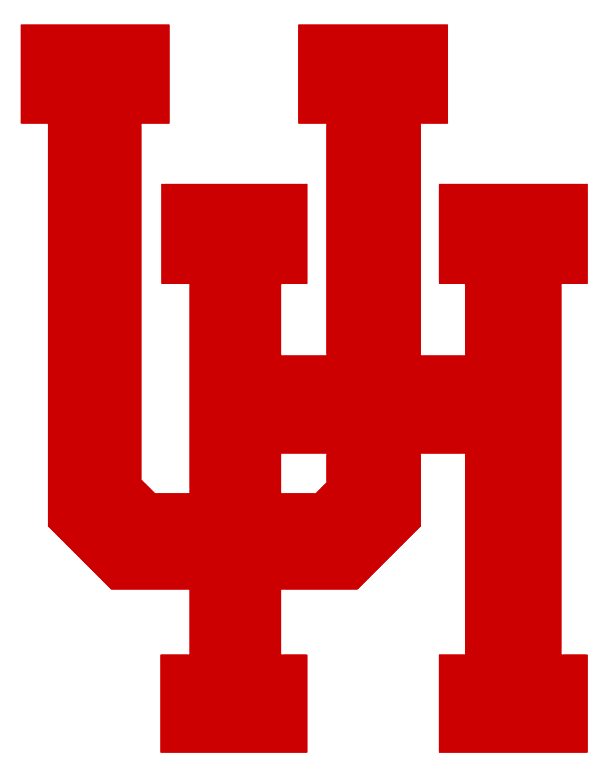

NIT, First Round
- Conference: Southwest Conference
- Record: 16–14 (8–8 SWC)
- Head coach: Guy Lewis (29th season)
- Assistant coaches: Terry Kirkpatrick; Don Schverak
- Home arena: Hofheinz Pavilion

1984–85 Southwest Conference men's basketball standings
| | Conf. | | | | Overall |
| Team | W | | L | PCT | W | | L | PCT |
|---|---|---|---|---|---|---|---|---|
| No. 17 Texas Tech † | 12 | – | 4 | .750 | 23 | – | 8 | .742 |
| SMU | 10 | – | 6 | .625 | 23 | – | 10 | .697 |
| Texas A&M | 10 | – | 6 | .625 | 19 | – | 11 | .633 |
| Arkansas | 10 | – | 6 | .625 | 22 | – | 13 | .629 |
| TCU | 8 | – | 8 | .500 | 16 | – | 12 | .571 |
| Houston | 8 | – | 8 | .500 | 16 | – | 14 | .533 |
| Texas | 7 | – | 9 | .438 | 15 | – | 13 | .536 |
| Baylor | 4 | – | 12 | .250 | 11 | – | 17 | .393 |
| Rice | 3 | – | 13 | .188 | 11 | – | 16 | .407 |
† 1985 SWC tournament winner Rankings from AP Poll

The 1984–85 Houston Cougars men's basketball team represented the University of Houston in NCAA Division I competition in the 1984–85 season.

Houston, coached by Guy Lewis, played its home games in the Hofheinz Pavilion in Houston, Texas, and was then a member of the Southwest Conference.

== Roster ==
1984–85 Houston Cougars men's basketball team
Players
Coaches

| Pos. | # | Name | Height | Weight | Year | Previous school | Hometown |
|---|---|---|---|---|---|---|---|
| G/F | 22 | Marvin Alexander | 6 ft 4 in (1.93 m) | 190 lb (86 kg) | Sr | Worthing HS | Houston, TX |
| F/C | 54 | Greg Anderson | 6 ft 9 in (2.06 m) | 220 lb (100 kg) | So | Worthing HS | Houston, TX |
| F | 50 | Stacey Belcher | 6 ft 6 in (1.98 m) | 210 lb (95 kg) | So | Yates HS | Houston, TX |
| F | 52 | Braxton Clark | 6 ft 8 in (2.03 m) | 230 lb (104 kg) | Sr | De Anza College | San Francisco, CA |
| G | 14 | Eric Dickens | 6 ft 1 in (1.85 m) | 170 lb (77 kg) | Sr | Madison HS | Houston, TX |
| G | 20 | Alvin Franklin | 6 ft 2 in (1.88 m) | 185 lb (84 kg) | Jr | La Marque HS | La Marque, TX |
| G/F | 44 | Reid Gettys | 6 ft 6 in (1.98 m) | 200 lb (91 kg) | Sr | Memorial HS | Houston, TX |
| F | 30 | Gary Orsak | 6 ft 7 in (2.01 m) | 220 lb (100 kg) | Sr | Alvin HS | Alvin, TX |
| G | 12 | Renaldo Thomas | 6 ft 4 in (1.93 m) | 200 lb (91 kg) | Jr | Roosevelt HS | Gary, IN |
| G | 24 | James Weaver | 6 ft 4 in (1.93 m) | 190 lb (86 kg) | So | Nederland HS | Nederland, TX |
| F | 40 | Rickie Winslow | 6 ft 8 in (2.03 m) | 215 lb (98 kg) | So | Yates HS | Houston, TX |

Head coach

- Guy Lewis (Houston)

Assistant coach(es)

- Terry Kirkpatrick
- Don Schverak

Legend

- (C) Team captain
- (S) Suspended
- (I) Ineligible
- (W) Walk-on
- Injured
- Current redshirt

Roster

== Schedule and results ==
| Date time, TV | Rank^{#} | Opponent^{#} | Result | Record | Site (attendance) city, state |
Regular season
| Nov 24, 1984* | | Concordia Lutheran | W 85–62 | 1–0 | Hofheinz Pavilion; Houston, Texas |
| Nov 26, 1984* | | St. Mary's | W 69–53 | 2–0 | Hofheinz Pavilion; Houston, Texas |
| Nov 30, 1984* | | vs. South Alabama; IPTAY Tournament | L 70–86 | 2–1 | Littlejohn Coliseum; Clemson, South Carolina |
| Dec 1, 1984* | | vs. Campbell; IPTAY Tournament | W 73–64 | 3–1 | Littlejohn Coliseum; Clemson, South Carolina |
| Dec 4, 1984* | | Southwestern | W 93–81 | 4–1 | Hofheinz Pavilion; Houston, Texas |
| Dec 8, 1984* | | No. 13 LSU | W 81–73 | 5–1 | Hofheinz Pavilion; Houston, Texas |
| Dec 15, 1984* | | at No. 18 Kansas | L 75–87 | 5–2 | Allen Fieldhouse; Lawrence, Kansas |
| Dec 21, 1984* | | Portland; Kettle Classic | W 88–63 | 6–2 | Hofheinz Pavilion; Houston, Texas |
| Dec 22, 1984* | | Saint Mary's; Kettle Classic | W 66–63 | 7–2 | Hofheinz Pavilion; Houston, Texas |
| Dec 28, 1984* | | BYU–Hawaii | W 100–77 | 8–2 | Hofheinz Pavilion; Houston, Texas |
| Jan 2, 1985 | | at TCU | W 83–73 | 9–2 (1–0) | Daniel-Meyer Coliseum; Fort Worth, Texas |
| Jan 5, 1985 | | at Texas | L 58–61 | 9–3 (1–1) | Frank Erwin Center; Austin, Texas |
| Jan 9, 1985 | | Texas Tech | W 83–74 | 10–3 (2–1) | Hofheinz Pavilion; Houston, Texas |
| Jan 12, 1985* | | at No. 13 DePaul | L 58–69 | 10–4 | Rosemont Horizon; Chicago, Illinois |
| Jan 16, 1985 | | at Rice | W 77–73 | 11–4 (3–1) | Rice Gymnasium; Houston, Texas |
| Jan 19, 1985 | | Arkansas | W 78–73 | 12–4 (4–1) | Hofheinz Pavilion; Houston, Texas |
| Jan 24, 1985 | | Baylor | W 81–71 | 13–4 (5–1) | Hofheinz Pavilion; Houston, Texas |
| Jan 27, 1985 | | at Texas A&M | L 69–71 | 13–5 (5–2) | G. Rollie White Coliseum; College Station, Texas |
| Jan 30, 1985 | | at No. 4 SMU | L 78–85 | 13–6 (5–3) | Moody Coliseum; University Park, Texas |
| Feb 1, 1985 | | TCU | L 80–85 | 13–7 (5–4) | Hofheinz Pavilion; Houston, Texas |
| Feb 3, 1985* | | No. 5 Illinois | L 76–77 | 13–8 | Hofheinz Pavilion; Houston, Texas |
| Feb 6, 1985 | | Texas | W 94–80 | 14–8 (6–4) | Hofheinz Pavilion; Houston, Texas |
| Feb 10, 1985 | | at Texas Tech | L 80–91 | 14–9 (6–5) | Lubbock Municipal Coliseum; Lubbock, Texas |
| Feb 17, 1985 | | Rice | W 96–91 | 15–9 (7–5) | Hofheinz Pavilion; Houston, Texas |
| Feb 20, 1985 | | at Arkansas | L 59–73 | 15–10 (7–6) | Barnhill Arena; Fayetteville, Arkansas |
| Feb 23, 1985 | | at Baylor | L 84–88 | 15–11 (7–7) | Heart O' Texas Coliseum; Waco, Texas |
| Feb 27, 1985 | | Texas A&M | L 77–81 | 15–12 (7–8) | Hofheinz Pavilion; Houston, Texas |
| Mar 3, 1985 | | No. 13 SMU | W 79–76 | 16–12 (8–8) | Hofheinz Pavilion; Houston, Texas |
SWC tournament
| Mar 8, 1985* | (6) | vs. (3) No. 20 SMU; Quarterfinals | L 72–84 | 16–13 | Reunion Arena; Dallas, Texas |
NIT
| Mar 15, 1985* | | at Lamar; First round | L 71–78 | 16–14 | Montagne Center; Beaumont, Texas |
*Non-conference game. ^{#}Rankings from AP poll. (#) Tournament seedings in parentheses.
