= 1984–85 Kansas Jayhawks men's basketball team =

American college basketball season

1984–85 Kansas Jayhawks men's basketball

NCAA tournament, Round of 32
- Conference: Big Eight Conference

Ranking
- Coaches: No. 13
- AP: No. 13
- Record: 26–8 (11–3 Big 8)
- Head coach: Larry Brown (2nd season)
- Assistant coaches: R. C. Buford (2nd season); John Calipari (3rd season); Bob Hill (6th season); Ed Manning (2nd season)
- Captain: Tad Boyle
- Home arena: Allen Fieldhouse

1984–85 Big Eight Conference men's basketball standings
	Conf.				Overall
Team	W		L	PCT	W		L	PCT
No. 4 Oklahoma†	13	–	1	.929	31	–	6	.838
No. 13 Kansas	11	–	3	.786	26	–	8	.765
Iowa State	7	–	7	.500	21	–	13	.618
Missouri	7	–	7	.500	18	–	14	.563
Kansas State	5	–	9	.357	14	–	14	.500
Colorado	5	–	9	.357	11	–	17	.393
Nebraska	5	–	9	.357	16	–	14	.533
Oklahoma State	3	–	11	.214	12	–	16	.429
† 1985 Big Eight tournament winner Rankings from AP Poll

The 1984–85 Kansas Jayhawks men's basketball team represented the University of Kansas during the 1984–85 NCAA Division I men's basketball season.

== Roster ==
- Ron Kellogg
- Danny Manning
- Calvin Thompson
- Greg Dreiling
- Cedric Hunter
- Milt Newton
- Mark Turgeon
- Tad Boyle
- Mark Pellock
- Altonio Campbell
- Chris Piper
- Rodney Hull
- Jeff Johnson
- Don Kennedy
- Jim Pelton

== Schedule ==
Date time, TV	Rank^{#}	Opponent^{#}	Result	Record	Site city, state
November 23*	No. 19	vs. Maryland; Great Alaska Shootout Quarterfinals	W 58-56	1–0	Sullivan Arena; Anchorage, AK
November 24*	No. 19	vs. Oregon; Great Alaska Shootout Semifinals	W 66-49	2–0	Sullivan Arena; Anchorage, AK
November 25*	No. 19	vs. UAB; Great Alaska Shootout Championship Game	L 46-50	2–1	Sullivan Arena; Anchorage, AK
December 1*	No. 20	Detroit Mercy	W 86–64	3–1	Allen Fieldhouse; Lawrence, KS
December 10*	No. 19	South Carolina State	W 81-54	4–1	Allen Fieldhouse; Lawrence, KS
December 15*	No. 18	Houston	W 87-75	5–1	Allen Fieldhouse; Lawrence, KS
December 22*	No. 15	at George Washington	W 76-70	6–1	Charles E. Smith Center; Washington, D.C.
December 31*	No. 12	vs. Kentucky	L 89-92	6-2	Freedom Hall; Louisville, KY
January 3*	No. 11	Texas Southern	W 78-74	7-2	Allen Fieldhouse; Lawrence, KS
January 5*	No. 12	vs. Wichita State	W 90-83	8-2	Kemper Arena; Kansas City, MO
January 7*	No. 12	Western Carolina	W 79-62	9-2	Allen Fieldhouse; Lawrence, KS
December 27*	No. 10	at South Alabama	W 90-81	10-2	Jaguar Gym; Mobile, AL
January 17	No. 9	Iowa State	W 76-72	11-2 (1-0)	Allen Fieldhouse; Lawrence, KS
January 19	No. 9	at No. 13 Oklahoma	L 76-87	11-3 (1-1)	Lloyd Noble Center; Norman, OK
January 22	No. 15	Missouri; Border War	W 70-68	12-3 (2-1)	Allen Fieldhouse; Lawrence, KS
January 26	No. 15	at Colorado	W 70-68	13-3 (3-1)	Coors Events/Conference Center; Boulder, CO
January 27*	No. 15	at No. 18 Michigan	L 77-96	13-4 (3-1)	Crisler Arena; Ann Arbor, MI
January 18	No. 19	at Kansas State; Sunflower Showdown	W 75-57	14-4 (4-1)	Ahearn Field House; Manhattan, KS
February 2	No. 19	at Nebraska	W 91-80	15-4 (5-1)	Bob Devaney Sports Center; Lincoln, NE
January 23	No. 13	Oklahoma State	W 81–77	16-4 (6-1)	Allen Fieldhouse; Lawrence, KS
February 10*	No. 13	No. 3 Memphis State	W 75-71	17-4 (6-1)	Allen Fieldhouse; Lawrence, KS
February 12	No. 10	at Missouri; Border War	L 55-62	17-5 (6-2)	Hearnes Center; Columbia, MO
February 16	No. 10	at Iowa State	L 70-72	17-6 (6-3)	James H. Hilton Coliseum; Ames, IA
February 20	No. 15	Kansas State; Sunflower Showdown	W 75-64	18-6 (7-3)	Allen Fieldhouse; Lawrence, KS
February 23	No. 15	Colorado	W 88-69	25-6 (8-3)	Allen Fieldhouse; Lawrence, KS
February 24	No. 15	No. 5 Oklahoma	W 82-76	20-6 (9-3)	Allen Fieldhouse; Lawrence, KS
February 28	No. 11	Nebraska	W 70-65	21-6 (10-3)	Allen Fieldhouse; Lawrence, KS
March 2	No. 11	at Oklahoma State	W 88-79	22-6 (11-3)	Gallagher Iba Arena; Stillwater, OK
March 5*	No. 10	Nebraska; Big Eight Conference men's basketball tournament quarterfinals	W 74–69	27-6 (11-3)	Allen Fieldhouse; Lawrence, KS
March 6	No. 10	vs. Iowa State; Big Eight Tournament Semifinals	L 59-75	27-6 (11-3)	Kemper Arena; Kansas City, MO
March 13*	(3) No. 13	vs. (14) Ohio; NCAA Southeast Regional first round	W 49-38	28-6 (11-3)	Edmund P. Joyce & Convocation Center; Notre Dame, IN
March 16*	(3) No. 13	vs. (11) Auburn; NCAA Southeast Regional second round	L 64-66	28-7 (11-3)	Edmund P. Joyce & Convocation Center; Notre Dame, IN
*Non-conference game. ^{#}Rankings from AP Poll. (#) Tournament seedings in parentheses. SE=Southeast.
