= 1984–85 Iowa State Cyclones men's basketball team =

American college basketball season

1984–85 Iowa State Cyclones men's basketball

NCAA Tournament, First Round
- Conference: Big Eight Conference
- Record: 21–13 (7–7 Big Eight)
- Head coach: Johnny Orr (5th season)
- Assistant coaches: Steve Antrim; Jim Hallihan
- Home arena: Hilton Coliseum

1984–85 Big Eight Conference men's basketball standings
	Conf.				Overall
Team	W		L	PCT	W		L	PCT
No. 4 Oklahoma†	13	–	1	.929	31	–	6	.838
No. 13 Kansas	11	–	3	.786	26	–	8	.765
Iowa State	7	–	7	.500	21	–	13	.618
Missouri	7	–	7	.500	18	–	14	.563
Kansas State	5	–	9	.357	14	–	14	.500
Colorado	5	–	9	.357	11	–	17	.393
Nebraska	5	–	9	.357	16	–	14	.533
Oklahoma State	3	–	11	.214	12	–	16	.429
† 1985 Big Eight tournament winner Rankings from AP Poll

The 1984–85 Iowa State Cyclones men's basketball team represented Iowa State University during the 1984–85 NCAA Division I men's basketball season. The Cyclones were coached by Johnny Orr, who was in his 5th season. They played their home games at Hilton Coliseum in Ames, Iowa.

They finished the season 21–13, 7–7 in Big Eight play to finish in a tie for third place. The Cyclones advanced to the Big Eight tournament championship game against #4 Oklahoma, falling 73–71. They qualified for the NCAA Tournament as a 13 seed, falling in the first round to 4 seed Ohio State, 75–64.

== Roster ==
1984–85 Iowa State Cyclones men's basketball team
Players
Coaches

Pos.	#	Name	Height	Weight	Year	Hometown
G		Barry Stevens (C)	6 ft 5 in (1.96 m)	—	Sr
G		Jeff Hornacek (C)	6 ft 3 in (1.91 m)	—	Jr
G		Jeff Grayer	6 ft 5 in (1.96 m)	—	Fr	Flint, Michigan
C		Sam Hill	6 ft 9 in (2.06 m)	—	So
G		Gary Thompkins	6 ft 3 in (1.91 m)	—	Fr
F		Ron Virgil	6 ft 4 in (1.93 m)	—	Jr
F		Lafester Rhodes	6 ft 8 in (2.03 m)	—	Fr
F		Tom Peterson	6 ft 5 in (1.96 m)	—	Sr
C		David Moss	6 ft 9 in (2.06 m)	—	Jr
F		Eli Parker	6 ft 7 in (2.01 m)	—	Fr
		Wes Wallace	—	—	Sr
C		Brad Dudek	7 ft 1 in (2.16 m)	—
F		Ray Harris	—	—

Head coach

- Johnny Orr (Beloit)

Assistant coach(es)

- Steve Antrim
- Jim Hallihan

Legend

- (C) Team captain
- (S) Suspended
- (I) Ineligible
- (W) Walk-on
- Injured
- Current redshirt

== Schedule and results ==
Date time, TV	Rank^{#}	Opponent^{#}	Result	Record	Site city, state
Exhibition
November 24, 1984*; 1:00 pm		Brandon (Canada); Exhibition	W 78–68		Hilton Coliseum (8,862); Ames, Iowa
Regular season
November 27, 1984*; 8:00 pm, WOI		Mankato State	W 93–57	1–0	Hilton Coliseum (13,810); Ames, Iowa
December 1, 1984*; 1:10 pm, WOI		Creighton	W 77–68	2–0	Hilton Coliseum (14,132); Ames, Iowa
December 4, 1984*; 7:35 pm, Iowa Television Network		at Iowa; CyHawk Rivalry	W 54–50	3–0	Carver–Hawkeye Arena (15,450); Iowa City, Iowa
December 6, 1984*; 7:30 pm		Augustana	W 113–55	4–0	Hilton Coliseum (13,874); Ames, Iowa
December 8, 1984*; 1:10 pm, WOI		Drake; Iowa Big Four	W 74–73	5–0	Hilton Coliseum (14,106); Ames, Iowa
December 11, 1984*; 8:10 pm, Sports Time		Indiana	L 67–69	5–1	Hilton Coliseum (14,296); Ames, Iowa
December 14, 1984*; 6:00 pm		vs. No. 11 Virginia Tech; Volunteer Classic Semifinals	L 53–80	5–2	Stokely Athletic Center; Knoxville, Tennessee
December 15, 1984*; 6:00 pm		vs. Southern Miss; Volunteer Classic Consolation	W 73–72	6–2	Stokely Athletic Center; Knoxville, Tennessee
December 17, 1984*; 8:00 pm		Denver	W 90–47	7–2	Hilton Coliseum; Ames, Iowa
December 22, 1984*; 8:00 pm		Colorado State	W 85–49	8–2	Hilton Coliseum; Ames, Iowa
December 26, 1984*; 10:40 pm, WHO-TV		vs. No. 11 Washington; Rainbow Classic Quarterfinals	L 59–72	8–3	Blaisdell Arena; Honolulu, HI
December 27, 1984*; 6:30 pm, WHO-TV		vs. Arkansas; Rainbow Classic Consolation Semifinals	L 79–84 ^{OT}	8–4	Blaisdell Arena (1,581); Honolulu, HI
December 28, 1984*; 4:30 pm		vs. Cornell; Rainbow Classic Consolation Seventh Place	W 81–59	9–4	Blaisdell Arena; Honolulu, HI
January 3, 1985*; 8:00 pm		Morgan State	W 114–67	10–4	Hilton Coliseum; Ames, Iowa
January 8, 1985*; 8:00 pm		Abilene Christian	W 106–86	11–4	Hilton Coliseum; Ames, Iowa
January 10, 1985*; 8:00 pm, KGAN/Heritage Cablevision		at Northern Iowa; Iowa Big Four	W 69–61	12–4	UNI-Dome; Cedar Falls, Iowa
January 17, 1985; 7:40 pm, Sports Time		at No. 9 Kansas	L 72–76	12–5 (0–1)	Allen Fieldhouse (14,800); Lawrence, Kansas
January 19, 1985; 2:40 pm, Big Eight/KAB Sports		at Missouri	W 71–64	13–5 (1–1)	Hearnes Center; Columbia, Missouri
January 23, 1985; 8:00 pm, Big Eight/KAB Sports		No. 11 Oklahoma	L 74–81	13–6 (1–2)	Hilton Coliseum (14,342); Ames, Iowa
January 26, 1985; 3:00 pm		at Oklahoma State	W 64–58	14–6 (2–2)	Gallagher-Iba Arena; Stillwater, Oklahoma
January 30, 1985; 8:00 pm		Nebraska	W 76–65	15–6 (3–2)	Hilton Coliseum; Ames, Iowa
February 2, 1985; 1:00 pm		Kansas State	W 58–54	16–6 (4–2)	Hilton Coliseum; Ames, Iowa
February 7, 1985; 9:10 pm, Sports Time		at Colorado	L 70–72	16–7 (4–3)	Coors Events Center (5,478); Boulder, Colorado
February 9, 1985; 3:10 pm, Big Eight/KAB Sports		Missouri	L 70–73	16–8 (4–4)	Hilton Coliseum; Ames, Iowa
February 13, 1985; 7:35 pm		at No. 4 Oklahoma	L 76–104	16–9 (4–5)	Lloyd Noble Center; Norman, Oklahoma
February 16, 1985; 1:10 pm, Big Eight/KAB Sports		No. 10 Kansas	W 72–70	17–9 (5–5)	Hilton Coliseum; Ames, Iowa
February 21, 1985; 7:40 pm, Sports Time		at Nebraska	L 57–74	17–10 (5–6)	Devaney Sports Center; Lincoln, Nebraska
February 23, 1985; 1:00 pm		Oklahoma State	W 82–67	18–10 (6–6)	Hilton Coliseum; Ames, Iowa
February 27, 1985; 7:35 pm		at Kansas State	L 67–68	18–11 (6–7)	Ahearn Fieldhouse; Manhattan, Kansas
March 2, 1985; Big Eight		at Colorado	W 70–63	19–11 (7–7)	Hilton Coliseum (14,216); Ames, Iowa
Big Eight tournament
March 6, 1985; 7:10 pm, WOI/KMTV/KCAU	(3)	vs. (6) Colorado; Big Eight tournament quarterfinals	W 76–52	20–11	Hilton Coliseum (12,340); Ames, Iowa
March 8, 1985; 9:30 pm, Big Eight	(3)	vs. (2) No. 10 Kansas; Big Eight tournament semifinals	W 75–59	21–11	Kemper Arena (17,250); Kansas City, Missouri
March 9, 1985; 1:00 pm, CBS	(3)	vs. (1) No. 4 Oklahoma; Big Eight tournament finals	L 71–73	21–12	Kemper Arena (13,200); Kansas City, Missouri
NCAA Tournament
March 14, 1985*; 12:07 pm, ESPN/NCAA Productions	(13 MW)	vs. (4 MW) Ohio State; NCAA tournament Midwest Region First Round	L 64–75	21–13	Mabee Center (10,575); Tulsa, Oklahoma
*Non-conference game. ^{#}Rankings from AP poll. (#) Tournament seedings in parentheses. All times are in Central Time.
