= 1984–85 Oklahoma Sooners men's basketball team =

American college basketball season

1984–85 Oklahoma Sooners men's basketball

Big 8 Conference regular season champions Big 8 Conference tournament champions

NCAA men's Division I tournament, #1 Seed, Elite Eight
- Conference: Big 8 Conference

Ranking
- Coaches: No. 5
- AP: No. 4
- Record: 31–6 (13–1 Big 8)
- Head coach: Billy Tubbs (5th season)
- Assistant coaches: Mike Anderson; Jim Kerwin (1st season); Mike Mims
- Home arena: Lloyd Noble Center (Capacity: 11,528)

1984–85 Big Eight Conference men's basketball standings
	Conf.				Overall
Team	W		L	PCT	W		L	PCT
No. 4 Oklahoma†	13	–	1	.929	31	–	6	.838
No. 13 Kansas	11	–	3	.786	26	–	8	.765
Iowa State	7	–	7	.500	21	–	13	.618
Missouri	7	–	7	.500	18	–	14	.563
Kansas State	5	–	9	.357	14	–	14	.500
Colorado	5	–	9	.357	11	–	17	.393
Nebraska	5	–	9	.357	16	–	14	.533
Oklahoma State	3	–	11	.214	12	–	16	.429
† 1985 Big Eight tournament winner Rankings from AP Poll

The 1984–85 Oklahoma Sooners men's basketball team represented the University of Oklahoma in competitive college basketball during the 1984–85 NCAA Division I season. The Oklahoma Sooners men's basketball team played its home games in the Lloyd Noble Center and was a member of the National Collegiate Athletic Association's (NCAA) former Big Eight Conference at that time. The team posted a 31–6 overall record and a 13–1 conference record to finish first in the Conference for head coach Billy Tubbs. This was the first Big Eight Conference tournament championship and second Conference regular season championship for Tubbs. This was Tubbs' first NCAA Division I men's basketball tournament #1 seed.

The team was led by All American and Big Eight Conference Men's Basketball Player of the Year Wayman Tisdale. The team lost two of its first four games, both to Illinois. It then won four home games before losing to SMU in the Chaminade Classic in Honolulu, Hawaii. The team then won four more before losing at Tulsa. The team then won twelve in a row before losing at Kansas. The team then won its last three regular season games, its three conference tournament games and its first three 1984 NCAA Division I men's basketball tournament games before it was eliminated in the elite eight round by Memphis.

Among his numerous accomplishments, Wayman Tisdale established the current Oklahoma Sooners men's basketball career scoring (2661), career scoring average (25.6), career rebounds (1048), single-season points (932) records. Tisdale became the first Associated Press All-American first-team selection as a freshman, sophomore and junior and the first three-time Big Eight Conference scoring champion.

== Roster ==
1984–85 Oklahoma Sooners men's basketball team
Players
Coaches

Pos.	#	Name	Height	Weight	Year	Previous school	Hometown
G	22	William Tisdale	6 ft 4 in (1.93 m)	210 lb (95 kg)	Jr	Booker T. Washington	Tulsa, Oklahoma
F	23	Wayman Tisdale	6 ft 9 in (2.06 m)	240 lb (109 kg)	Jr	Booker T. Washington	Tulsa, Oklahoma
G/F	25	Anthony Bowie	6 ft 6 in (1.98 m)	190 lb (86 kg)	Jr	East Central	Tulsa, Oklahoma
F	30	Darryl Kennedy	6 ft 5 in (1.96 m)	190 lb (86 kg)	So	Northwest Classen	Oklahoma City, Oklahoma
G	32	Tim McCalister	6 ft 3 in (1.91 m)	195 lb (88 kg)	So	West Side	Gary, Indiana
F/C	55	David Johnson	6 ft 7 in (2.01 m)	255 lb (116 kg)	So	Wyandotte	Kansas City, Kansas

Head coach

- Billy Tubbs (Lamar)

Assistant coach(es)

Legend

- (C) Team captain
- (S) Suspended
- (I) Ineligible
- (W) Walk-on
- Injured
- Current redshirt

Roster

== Schedule and results ==
Date time, TV	Rank^{#}	Opponent^{#}	Result	Record	Site city, state
Regular season
Nov 18, 1984*	No. 5	vs. No. 2 Illinois; Hall of Fame Tip-Off Classic	L 64–81	0–1	Springfield Civic Center (7,530); Springfield, Massachusetts
Nov 24, 1984*	No. 5	Morehead State	W 94–48	1–1	Lloyd Noble Center (11,400); Norman, Oklahoma
Nov 26, 1984*	No. 10	Arkansas-Little Rock	W 90–63	2–1	Lloyd Noble Center; Norman, Oklahoma
Dec 1, 1984*	No. 10	at No. 7 Illinois	L 70–73	2–2	Assembly Hall (16,671); Champaign, Illinois
Dec 5, 1984*	No. 17	St. Mary's (TX)	W 88–55	3–2	Lloyd Noble Center; Norman, Oklahoma
Dec 8, 1984*	No. 17	Loyola-Chicago	W 115–82	4–2	Lloyd Noble Center (11,200); Norman, Oklahoma
Dec 10, 1984*	No. 15	Southwestern (TX)	W 126–76	5–2	Lloyd Noble Center; Norman, Oklahoma
Dec 15, 1984*	No. 15	Puget Sound	W 101–71	6–2	Lloyd Noble Center (11,455); Norman, Oklahoma
Dec 22, 1984*	No. 11	vs. No. 6 Southern Methodist	L 76–85	6–3	Neal S. Blaisdell Center; Honolulu, Hawaii
Dec 25, 1984*	No. 17	vs. No. 20 Louisville	W 90–72	7–3	Neal S. Blaisdell Center; Honolulu, Hawaii
Dec 29, 1984*	No. 17	vs. Manhattan; All-College Tournament	W 121–74	8–3	The Myriad; Oklahoma City, Oklahoma
Dec 30, 1984*	No. 17	vs. No. 19 Louisiana Tech; All-College Tournament	W 84–72	9–3	The Myriad (10,287); Oklahoma City, Oklahoma
Jan 5, 1985*	No. 13	Northeast Louisiana	W 101–95	10–3	Lloyd Noble Center; Norman, Oklahoma
Jan 9, 1985*	No. 8	at Tulsa	L 89–104	10–4	Tulsa Convention Center; Tulsa, Oklahoma
Jan 12, 1985*	No. 8	Northwestern State	W 98–62	11–4	Lloyd Noble Center; Norman, Oklahoma
Jan 16, 1985	No. 13	Missouri	W 92–65	12–4 (1–0)	Lloyd Noble Center; Norman, Oklahoma
Jan 19, 1985	No. 13	No. 9 Kansas	W 87–76	13–4 (2–0)	Lloyd Noble Center; Norman, Oklahoma
Jan 23, 1985	No. 11	at Iowa State	W 81–74	14–4 (3–0)	Hilton Coliseum (14,342); Ames, Iowa
Jan 26, 1985	No. 9	Kansas State	W 94–75	15–4 (4–0)	Lloyd Noble Center (11,495); Norman, Oklahoma
Jan 29, 1985	No. 7	at Colorado	W 90–71	16–4 (5–0)	Coors Events Center; Boulder, Colorado
Feb 2, 1985	No. 7	at Oklahoma State	W 83–81	17–4 (6–0)	Gallagher-Iba Arena; Stillwater, Oklahoma
Feb 6, 1985	No. 7	Nebraska	W 83–74	18–4 (7–0)	Lloyd Noble Center (11,450); Norman, Oklahoma
Feb 9, 1985	No. 7	at Kansas State	W 81–75	19–4 (8–0)	Ahearn Fieldhouse; Manhattan, Kansas
Feb 13, 1985	No. 4	Iowa State	W 104–76	20–4 (9–0)	Lloyd Noble Center; Norman, Oklahoma
Feb 16, 1985	No. 4	at Missouri	W 88–84	21–4 (10–0)	Hearnes Center (12,288); Columbia, Missouri
Feb 20, 1985	No. 5	Colorado	W 110–80	22–4 (11–0)	Lloyd Noble Center; Norman, Oklahoma
Feb 24, 1985	No. 5	at No. 15 Kansas	L 76–82	22–5 (11–1)	Allen Fieldhouse (15,200); Lawrence, Kansas
Feb 27, 1985	No. 6	Oklahoma State	W 89–84	23–5 (12–1)	Lloyd Noble Center; Norman, Oklahoma
Mar 2, 1985	No. 6	at Nebraska	W 65–62	24–5 (13–1)	Bob Devaney Sports Center (14,688); Lincoln, Nebraska
Mar 3, 1985*	No. 6	No. 10 Georgia Tech	W 87–80	25–5	Lloyd Noble Center (11,619); Norman, Oklahoma
Big 8 Tournament
Mar 5, 1985*	(1) No. 4	(8) Oklahoma State; Quarterfinals	W 116–91	26–5	Lloyd Noble Center; Norman, Oklahoma
Mar 8, 1985*	(1) No. 4	vs. (4) Missouri; Semifinals	W 104–84	27–5	Kemper Arena (17,200); Kansas City, Missouri
Mar 7, 1985*	(1) No. 4	vs. (3) Iowa State; Championship Game	W 73–71	28–5	Kemper Arena (13,200); Kansas City, Missouri
NCAA Tournament
Mar 14, 1985*	(1 MW) No. 4	vs. (16 MW) North Carolina A&T; First round	W 96–83	29–5	Mabee Center; Tulsa, Oklahoma
Mar 16, 1985*	(1 MW) No. 4	vs. (9 MW) Illinois State; Second Round	W 75–69	30–5	Mabee Center (10,575); Tulsa, Oklahoma
Mar 21, 1985*	(1 MW) No. 4	vs. (5 MW) No. 8 Louisiana Tech; Midwest Regional semifinal – Sweet Sixteen	W 86–84 ^{OT}	31–5	Reunion Arena (17,007); Dallas, Texas
Mar 23, 1985*	(1 MW) No. 4	vs. (2 MW) No. 5 Memphis State; Midwest Regional Final – Elite Eight	L 61–63	31–6	Reunion Arena; Dallas, Texas
*Non-conference game. ^{#}Rankings from AP Poll. (#) Tournament seedings in parentheses. MW=Midwest.

=== NCAA basketball tournament ===
The following is a summary of the team's performance in the NCAA Division I men's basketball tournament:

- Midwest
  - Oklahoma (1) 96, North Carolina A&T (16) 83
  - Oklahoma 75, Illinois State (9) 69
  - Oklahoma 86, Louisiana Tech (5) 84 (OT) (Sweet 16)
  - Memphis State (2) 63, Oklahoma 61 (Regional Final)

== Honors ==
- All-American: Wayman Tisdale (3rd of 3 times)
- Big Eight POY: Tisdale

== Team players drafted into the NBA ==
The following players were drafted in the 1985 NBA draft:

Round	Pick	Player	Position	NBA club
1	2	Wayman Tisdale	Center	Indiana Pacers

The following players were varsity letter-winners from this team who were drafted in the NBA draft in later years:

- 1987 NBA draft: Tim McCalister (3rd, 47th, Los Angeles Clippers), David Johnson (4th, 89th, Dallas Mavericks), Darryl Kennedy (4th, 91st, Boston Celtics)
