= 1985 Big Eight Conference men's basketball tournament =

- Classification: Division I
- Season: 1984–85
- Teams: 8
- First round site: Campus Sites; Campus Arenas
- Finals site: Kemper Arena; Kansas City, MO
- Champions: Oklahoma (2nd title)
- Winning coach: Billy Tubbs (1st title)
- MVP: Wayman Tisdale (Oklahoma)

1984–85 Big Eight Conference men's basketball standings
	Conf.				Overall
Team	W		L	PCT	W		L	PCT
No. 4 Oklahoma†	13	–	1	.929	31	–	6	.838
No. 13 Kansas	11	–	3	.786	26	–	8	.765
Iowa State	7	–	7	.500	21	–	13	.618
Missouri	7	–	7	.500	18	–	14	.563
Kansas State	5	–	9	.357	14	–	14	.500
Colorado	5	–	9	.357	11	–	17	.393
Nebraska	5	–	9	.357	16	–	14	.533
Oklahoma State	3	–	11	.214	12	–	16	.429
† 1985 Big Eight tournament winner Rankings from AP Poll

The 1985 Big Eight Conference men's basketball tournament was held March 5–7 at a combination of on-campus gymnasiums and Kemper Arena in Kansas City, Missouri.

Top-seeded Oklahoma defeated #3 seed Iowa State in the championship game, 73–71, to win the Big Eight men's basketball tournament.

The Sooners received an automatic bid to the 1985 NCAA tournament. They were joined in the tournament by fellow Big Eight members Iowa State and Kansas, who earned at-large bids.

== Format ==
All eight of the conference's members participated in the tournament field. They were seeded based on regular season conference records, with all teams placed and paired in the initial quarterfinal round.

All first-round games were played on the home court of the higher-seeded team. The semifinals and championship game were played at Kemper Arena in Kansas City, Missouri.

== Bracket ==
Quarterfinals; Tuesday, March 5
1	4 Oklahoma	116
8	Oklahoma State	91
5	Kansas State	50
4	Missouri	68
3	Iowa State	76
6	Colorado	52
7	Nebraska	69
2	10 Kansas	74

Semifinals; Friday, March 8
1	4 Oklahoma	104
4	Missouri	84
3	Iowa State	75
2	10 Kansas	59

Championship; Saturday, March 9
1	4 Oklahoma	73
3	Iowa State	71
