= 1984–85 Arkansas Razorbacks men's basketball team =

American college basketball season

1984–85 Arkansas Razorbacks men's basketball

NCAA tournament, Round of 32
- Conference: Southwest Conference
- Record: 22–13 (10–6 SWC)
- Head coach: Eddie Sutton (11th season)
- Assistant coaches: Bill Brown (5th season); Doc Sadler (3rd season)
- Home arena: Barnhill Arena

1984–85 Southwest Conference men's basketball standings
	Conf.				Overall
Team	W		L	PCT	W		L	PCT
No. 17 Texas Tech †	12	–	4	.750	23	–	8	.742
SMU	10	–	6	.625	23	–	10	.697
Texas A&M	10	–	6	.625	19	–	11	.633
Arkansas	10	–	6	.625	22	–	13	.629
TCU	8	–	8	.500	16	–	12	.571
Houston	8	–	8	.500	16	–	14	.533
Texas	7	–	9	.438	15	–	13	.536
Baylor	4	–	12	.250	11	–	17	.393
Rice	3	–	13	.188	11	–	16	.407
† 1985 SWC tournament winner Rankings from AP Poll

The 1984–85 Arkansas Razorbacks men's basketball team represented the University of Arkansas during the 1984–85 NCAA Division I men's basketball season. The head coach was Eddie Sutton, serving for his 11th and final year. The team played its home games in Barnhill Arena in Fayetteville, Arkansas. This team finished second in the SWC regular season standings. As No. 9 seed in the West region of the 1985 NCAA Tournament, the Razorbacks defeated Iowa in the opening round before losing to eventual Final Four participant St. John's in the second round. Arkansas finished with a record of 22–13 (10–6 SWC).

== Roster ==
1984–85 Arkansas Razorbacks men's basketball team
Players	Coaches
Pos. / # / Name / Height / Weight / Year / Previous school / Hometown; C / 35 / Joe Kleine / 6 ft 11 in (2.11 m) / 250 lb (113 kg) / Sr / Notre Dame / Slater, Missouri	Head coach: Eddie Sutton; Assistant coach(es): Bill Brown; Doc Sadler; Legend: (C) Team captain; (S) Suspended; (I) Ineligible; (W) Walk-on; Injured; Current redshirt

== Schedule and results ==
Date time, TV	Rank^{#}	Opponent^{#}	Result	Record	Site (attendance) city, state
Regular Season
Nov 24, 1984*	No. 16	Southeastern Louisiana	W 65–62	1–0	Barnhill Arena; Fayetteville, Arkansas
Nov 27, 1984*	No. 17	vs. Central Florida	W 59–45	2–0	
Dec 1, 1984*	No. 17	at Ohio State	L 84–85	2–1	St. John Arena; Columbus, Ohio
Dec 8, 1984*		SW Missouri State	W 70–56	3–1	Barnhill Arena; Fayetteville, Arkansas
Dec 14, 1984*		Charleston Southern	W 74–55	4–1	Barnhill Arena; Fayetteville, Arkansas
Dec 15, 1984*		vs. Tulsa	W 70–66	5–1	
Dec 18, 1984*		vs. UTSA	W 74–67	6–1	
Dec 20, 1984*		vs. Minnesota	W 56–46	7–1	
Dec 22, 1984*		at Oral Roberts	W 64–57	8–1	Mabee Center; Tulsa, Oklahoma
Dec 25, 1984*		vs. No. 10 Georgia Tech; Rainbow Classic	L 52–72	8–2	Neal S. Blaisdell Center; Honolulu, Hawaii
Dec 26, 1984*		vs. Iowa State; Rainbow Classic	W 84–79 ^{OT}	9–2	Neal S. Blaisdell Center; Honolulu, Hawaii
Dec 27, 1984*		vs. Iowa; Rainbow Classic	L 52–71	9–3	Neal S. Blaisdell Center; Honolulu, Hawaii
Jan 2, 1985		at Texas A&M	W 70–67	10–3 (1–0)	G. Rollie White Coliseum; College Station, Texas
Jan 5, 1985		at No. 7 SMU	L 60–63	10–4 (1–1)	Moody Coliseum; Dallas, Texas
Jan 9, 1985		TCU	W 67–59	11–4 (2–1)	Barnhill Arena; Fayetteville, Arkansas
Jan 12, 1985		Texas	W 64–58	12–4 (3–1)	Barnhill Arena; Fayetteville, Arkansas
Jan 16, 1985		at Texas Tech	L 48–64	12–5 (3–2)	Lubbock Municipal Coliseum; Lubbock, Texas
Jan 19, 1985		at Houston	L 73–78	12–6 (3–3)	Hofheinz Pavilion; Houston, Texas
Jan 23, 1985		Rice	W 67–56	13–6 (4–3)	Barnhill Arena; Fayetteville, Arkansas
Jan 27, 1985*		at Virginia	L 52–54	13–7	University Hall; Charlottesville, Virginia
Jan 30, 1985		at Baylor	W 64–57	14–7 (5–3)	Heart O' Texas Coliseum; Waco, Texas
Feb 1, 1985		Texas A&M	W 58–53	15–7 (6–3)	Barnhill Arena; Fayetteville, Arkansas
Feb 3, 1985*		at No. 2 Georgetown	L 39–56	15–8	Capital Centre (14,391); Landover, Maryland
Feb 6, 1985		No. 4 SMU	W 69–66	16–8 (7–3)	Barnhill Arena; Fayetteville, Arkansas
Feb 9, 1985		at TCU	L 66–72	16–9 (7–4)	Daniel-Meyer Coliseum; Fort Worth, Texas
Feb 16, 1985*		Texas Tech	L 50–52	16–10 (7–5)	Barnhill Arena; Fayetteville, Arkansas
Feb 19, 1985		at Texas	W 60–51	17–10 (8–5)	Frank Erwin Center; Austin, Texas
Feb 20, 1985		Houston	W 73–59	18–10 (9–5)	Barnhill Arena; Fayetteville, Arkansas
Feb 24, 1985		at Rice	L 68–71	18–11 (9–6)	Tudor Fieldhouse; Houston, Texas
Mar 1, 1985		Baylor	W 106–71	19–11 (10–6)	Barnhill Arena; Fayetteville, Arkansas
SWC Tournament
Mar 8, 1985*		vs. Texas; Quarterfinals	W 66–46	20–11	Reunion Arena; Dallas, Texas
Mar 9, 1985*		vs. No. 20 SMU; Semifinals	W 68–55	21–11	Reunion Arena; Dallas, Texas
Mar 10, 1985*		vs. Texas Tech; Championship game	L 64–67	21–12	Reunion Arena; Dallas, Texas
NCAA Tournament
Mar 14, 1985*	(9 W)	vs. (8 W) Iowa; First round	W 63–54	22–12	Jon M. Huntsman Center; Salt Lake City, Utah
Mar 16, 1985*	(9 W)	vs. (1 W) No. 3 St. John's; Second round	L 65–68	22–13	Jon M. Huntsman Center; Salt Lake City, Utah
*Non-conference game. ^{#}Rankings from AP Poll. (#) Tournament seedings in parentheses. W=West.

== Awards and honors ==
- Joe Kleine – Honorable Mention AP All-American

== 1985 NBA draft ==
Player	Round	Pick	NBA club
Joe Kleine	1	6	Sacramento Kings
