= 1985 MEAC men's basketball tournament =

- Classification: Division I
- Season: 1984–85
- Teams: 6
- Site: Palestra; Philadelphia, Pennsylvania
- Champions: North Carolina A&T (10th title)
- Winning coach: Don Corbett (4th title)
- MVP: Eric Boyd (North Carolina A&T)

1984–85 MEAC men's basketball standings
	Conf.				Overall
Team	W		L	PCT	W		L	PCT
North Carolina A&T †	10	–	2	.833	19	–	10	.655
Howard	9	–	3	.750	15	–	11	.577
Delaware State	8	–	4	.667	12	–	17	.414
South Carolina State	7	–	4	.636	11	–	16	.407
Bethune–Cookman	4	–	7	.364	8	–	19	.296
Maryland Eastern Shore	2	–	10	.167	3	–	25	.107
Morgan State	1	–	11	.083	3	–	25	.107
† 1985 MEAC tournament winner Rankings from AP Poll

The 1985 Mid-Eastern Athletic Conference men's basketball tournament took place March 7–9, 1985 at the Palestra in Philadelphia, Pennsylvania. North Carolina A&T defeated Howard, 71–69 in the championship game, to win its fourth consecutive MEAC Tournament title.

The Aggies earned an automatic bid to the 1985 NCAA tournament as a No. 16 seed in the Midwest region.

== Format ==
Six of seven conference members participated, with play beginning in the quarterfinal round. Teams were seeded based on their regular season conference record. After finishing 7th in the regular season standings, Morgan State did not participate.

== Bracket ==
Quarterfinals; March 7
4	South Carolina State	53
5	Bethune–Cookman	54
3	Delaware State	68
6	Maryland Eastern Shore	62

Semifinals; March 8
1	North Carolina A&T	97
5	Bethune–Cookman	75
6	Delaware State	59
2	Howard	73

Final; March 9
1	North Carolina A&T	71
2	Howard	69
