= 1984–85 Texas Tech Red Raiders basketball team =

American college basketball season

1984–85 Texas Tech Red Raiders basketball

SWC regular season champions SWC Classic tournament champions

NCAA Division I men's basketball tournament First round, L, 53-55 v. Boston College
- Conference: Southwest Conference

Ranking
- Coaches: No. 16
- AP: No. 17
- Record: 23–8 (12–4 SWC)
- Head coach: Gerald Myers (15th season)
- Home arena: Lubbock Municipal Coliseum

1984–85 Southwest Conference men's basketball standings
	Conf.				Overall
Team	W		L	PCT	W		L	PCT
No. 17 Texas Tech †	12	–	4	.750	23	–	8	.742
SMU	10	–	6	.625	23	–	10	.697
Texas A&M	10	–	6	.625	19	–	11	.633
Arkansas	10	–	6	.625	22	–	13	.629
TCU	8	–	8	.500	16	–	12	.571
Houston	8	–	8	.500	16	–	14	.533
Texas	7	–	9	.438	15	–	13	.536
Baylor	4	–	12	.250	11	–	17	.393
Rice	3	–	13	.188	11	–	16	.407
† 1985 SWC tournament winner Rankings from AP Poll

The 1984–85 Texas Tech Red Raiders men's basketball team represented Texas Tech University in the Southwest Conference during the 1984–85 NCAA Division I men's basketball season. The head coach was Gerald Myers, his 15th year with the team. The Red Raiders played their home games in the Lubbock Municipal Coliseum in Lubbock, Texas.

== Schedule and results ==
Date time, TV	Rank^{#}	Opponent^{#}	Result	Record	Site city, state
Non-conference regular season
Sat., Nov. 24, 1984*		Chicago State	W 70–67	1–0	Lubbock Municipal Coliseum; Lubbock, TX
Thu., Nov. 29, 1984*		Utah	W 81–73	2–0	Lubbock Municipal Coliseum; Lubbock, TX
Sat., Dec. 1, 1984*		UTSA	W 76–49	3–0	Lubbock Municipal Coliseum; Lubbock, TX
Mon., Dec. 3, 1984*		No. 9 Washington	L 57–59	3–1	Lubbock Municipal Coliseum; Lubbock, TX
Fri., Dec. 7, 1984*		vs. USC; Amana-Hawkeye Classic	W 63–59	4–1	Carver-Hawkeye Arena; Iowa City, IA
Sat., Dec. 8, 1984*		vs. Iowa; Amana-Hawkeye Classic	L 48–58	4–2	Carver-Hawkeye Arena; Iowa City, IA
Sat., Dec. 15, 1984*		Nebraska	L 74–79	4–3	Lubbock Municipal Coliseum; Lubbock, TX
Thu., Dec. 27, 1984*		at Colorado	W 76–75	5–3	Coors Events Center; Boulder, CO
Sat., Dec. 29, 1984*		at New Mexico State	W 97–87	6–3	Pan American Center; Las Cruces, NM
SWC regular season
Wed., Jan. 2, 1985		Texas	W 67–60	7–3 (1–0)	Lubbock Municipal Coliseum; Lubbock, TX
Non-conference regular season
Sat., Jan. 5, 1985*		North Texas	W 81–55	8–3	Lubbock Municipal Coliseum; Lubbock, TX
SWC regular season
Wed., Jan. 9, 1985		at Houston	L 74–83	8–4 (1–1)	Hofheinz Pavilion; Houston, TX
Sun., Jan. 13, 1985		Rice	W 78–54	9–4 (2–1)	Lubbock Municipal Coliseum; Lubbock, TX
Wed., Jan. 16, 1985		Arkansas	W 64–48	10–4 (3–1)	Lubbock Municipal Coliseum; Lubbock, TX
Sat., Jan. 19, 1985		at Baylor	W 92–71	11–4 (4–1)	Heart O' Texas Coliseum; Waco, TX
Wed., Jan. 23, 1985		at Texas A&M	L 47–50	11–5 (4–2)	G. Rollie White Coliseum; College Station, TX
Sat., Jan. 26, 1985		No. 2 SMU	W 64–63	12–5 (5–2)	Lubbock Municipal Coliseum; Lubbock, TX
Wed., Jan. 30, 1985		TCU	L 47–48	12–6 (5–3)	Lubbock Municipal Coliseum; Lubbock, TX
Sat., Feb. 2, 1985		at Texas	L 61–66	12–7 (5–4)	Frank Erwin Center; Austin, TX
Sun., Feb. 10, 1985		Houston	W 91–80	13–7 (6–4)	Lubbock Municipal Coliseum; Lubbock, TX
Wed., Feb. 13, 1985		at Rice	W 61–60	14–7 (7–4)	Autry Court; Houston, TX
Sat., Feb. 16, 1985		at Arkansas	W 52–50	15–7 (8–4)	Barnhill Arena; Fayetteville, AR
Wed., Feb. 20, 1985		Baylor	W 83–71	16–7 (9–4)	Lubbock Municipal Coliseum; Lubbock, TX
Sat., Feb. 23, 1985		Texas A&M	W 58–50	17–7 (10–4)	Lubbock Municipal Coliseum; Lubbock, TX
Wed., Feb. 27, 1985		at No. 13 SMU	W 59–54	18–7 (11–4)	Moody Coliseum; University Park, TX
Sat., Mar. 2, 1985		at TCU	W 61–53	19–7 (12–4)	Daniel-Meyer Coliseum; Fort Worth, TX
SWC Classic Tournament
Fri., Mar. 8, 1985	(1)	vs. (8) Baylor; Quarterfinals/Rivalry	W 83–76	20–7	Reunion Arena; Dallas, TX
Sat., Mar. 9, 1985	(1)	vs. (4) Texas A&M; Semifinals/Rivalry	W 72–63	21–7	Reunion Arena; Dallas, TX
Sun., Mar. 10, 1985	(1)	vs. (3) Arkansas; Final	W 67–64	22–7	Reunion Arena; Dallas, TX
NCAA Tournament
Fri., Mar. 15, 1985	(6 MW)	vs. (11 MW) Boston College; First Round	L 53–55	22–8	Hofheinz Pavilion; Houston, TX
*Non-conference game. ^{#}Rankings from AP Poll. (#) Tournament seedings in parentheses.
