= 1984–85 Duke Blue Devils men's basketball team =

American college basketball season

1984–85 Duke Blue Devils men's basketball

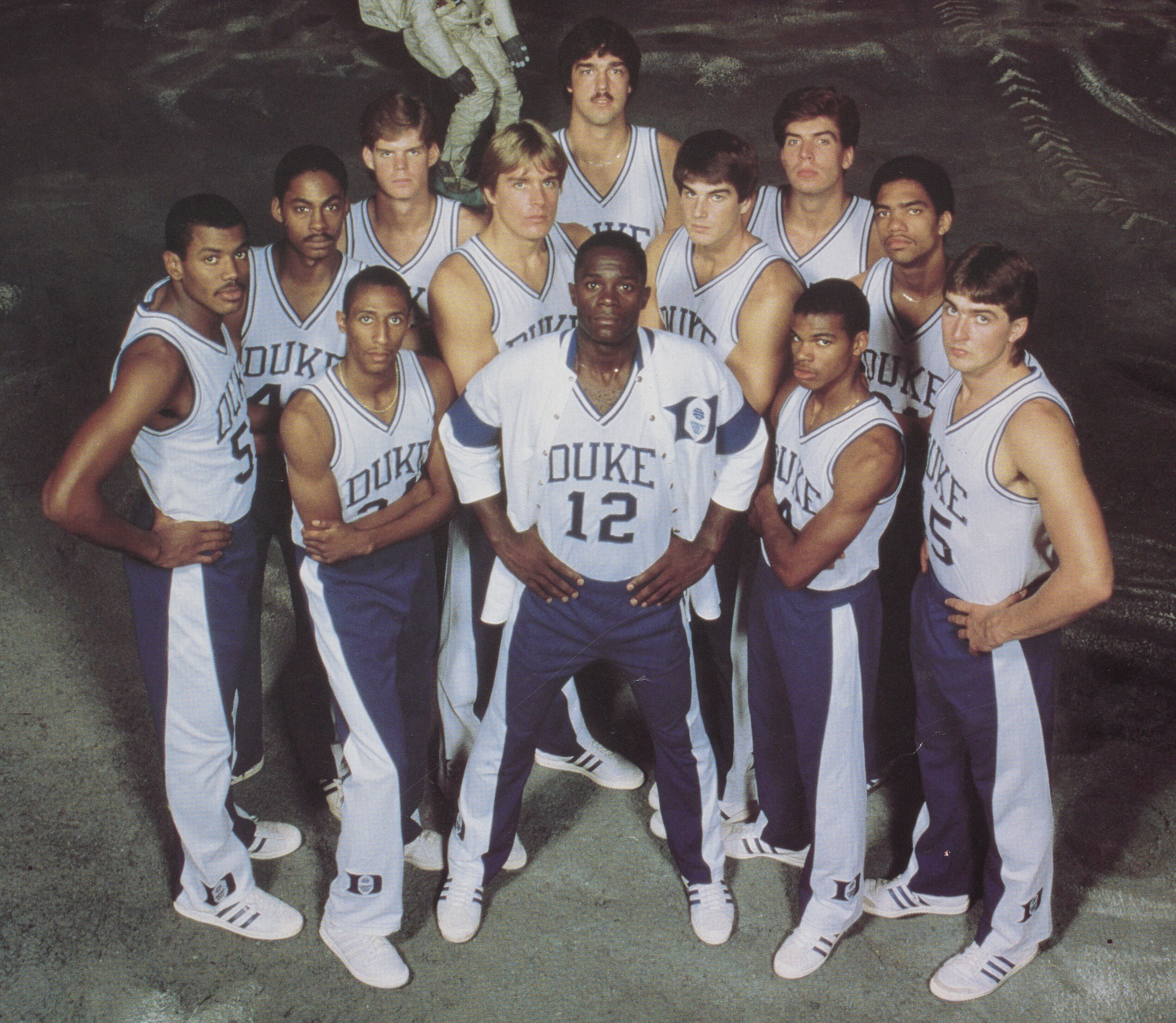

NCAA tournament, Round of 32
- Conference: Atlantic Coast Conference

Ranking
- Coaches: No. 12
- AP: No. 10
- Record: 23–8 (8–6 ACC)
- Head coach: Mike Krzyzewski (5th season)
- Assistant coaches: Chuck Swenson; Bob Bender; Pete Gaudet; Tom Rogers
- Home arena: Cameron Indoor Stadium

1984–85 ACC men's basketball standings
	Conf.				Overall
Team	W		L	PCT	W		L	PCT
No. 6 Georgia Tech †	9	–	5	.643	27	–	8	.771
No. 7 North Carolina	9	–	5	.643	27	–	9	.750
No. 16 NC State	9	–	5	.643	23	–	10	.697
No. 10 Duke	8	–	6	.571	23	–	8	.742
Maryland	8	–	6	.571	25	–	12	.676
Clemson	5	–	9	.357	16	–	13	.552
Wake Forest	5	–	9	.357	15	–	14	.517
Virginia	3	–	11	.214	17	–	16	.515
† 1985 ACC tournament winner Rankings from AP Poll

The 1984–85 Duke Blue Devils men's basketball team represented Duke University. The head coach was Mike Krzyzewski and the team finished the season with an overall record of 23–8.

== Roster ==
1984–85 Duke Blue Devils men's basketball team
Players
Coaches

Pos.	#	Name	Height	Weight	Year	Previous school	Hometown
G	4	Tommy Amaker	6 ft 0 in (1.83 m)	155 lb (70 kg)	So	W.T. Woodson	Falls Church, Virginia
G	12	David Henderson	6 ft 5 in (1.96 m)	195 lb (88 kg)	Jr	Warren County	Henderson, North Carolina
C	21	Jay Bilas	6 ft 8 in (2.03 m)	225 lb (102 kg)	Jr	Rolling Hills	Rolling Hills Estates, California
G	24	Johnny Dawkins	6 ft 2 in (1.88 m)	165 lb (75 kg)	Jr	Mackin Catholic	Washington, D.C.
G	31	Kevin Strickland	6 ft 5 in (1.96 m)	195 lb (88 kg)	Fr	North Surry	Mount Airy, North Carolina
PF	32	Mark Alarie	6 ft 7 in (2.01 m)	215 lb (98 kg)	Jr	Brophy Prep	Phoenix, Arizona
F	33	Jay Bryan	6 ft 7 in (2.01 m)	200 lb (91 kg)	Sr	Bear Creek	Lakewood, Colorado
F	40	Weldon Williams	6 ft 6 in (1.98 m)	190 lb (86 kg)	Jr	Crete-Monee	Park Forest, Illinois
F	44	Todd Anderson	6 ft 8 in (2.03 m)	230 lb (104 kg)	Sr	Armstrong	Golden Valley, Minnesota
F	45	Dan Meagher	6 ft 7 in (2.01 m)	215 lb (98 kg)	Sr	Denis Morris	St. Catharines, Ontario
C	51	Martin Nessley	7 ft 2 in (2.18 m)	260 lb (118 kg)	So	Whitehall-Yearling	Whitehall, Ohio
F	55	Billy King	6 ft 6 in (1.98 m)	205 lb (93 kg)	Fr	Park View	Sterling, Virginia

Head coach

- Mike Krzyzewski

Assistant coach(es)

- Chuck Swenson
- Bob Bender
- Pete Gaudet
- Tom Rogers

Legend

- (C) Team captain
- (S) Suspended
- (I) Ineligible
- (W) Walk-on
- Injured
- Current redshirt

Roster

== Schedule ==
Date time, TV	Rank^{#}	Opponent^{#}	Result	Record	Site (attendance) city, state
Regular season
Mon, Nov 26*; 7:30 p.m.	No. 6	at St. Louis	W 97–64	1–0	Kiel Auditorium (5,172); St. Louis, MO
Wed, Nov 28*; 7:30 p.m.	No. 4	William & Mary	W 92–60	2–0	Cameron Indoor Stadium (8,564); Durham, NC
Sat, Dec 1*; 7:30 p.m.	No. 4	St. Joseph's	W 59–46	3–0	Cameron Indoor Stadium (8,564); Durham, NC
Wed, Dec 5*; 7:30 p.m.	No. 4	Appalachian State	W 98–64	4–0	Cameron Indoor Stadium (8,564); Durham, NC
Sat, Dec 8; 9:00 p.m.	No. 4	Virginia	W 78–64	5–0 (1–0)	Cameron Indoor Stadium (8,564); Durham, NC
Mon, Dec 17*; 7:30 p.m.	No. 3	Davidson	W 82–65	6–0	Cameron Indoor Stadium (8,564); Durham, NC
Wed, Dec 19*; 8:30 p.m.	No. 2	at Northwestern	W 76–55	7–0	Welsh–Ryan Arena (7,043); Evanston, IL
Fri, Dec 28*; 10:00 p.m.	No. 2	vs. UAB; Trojan-Bud Light Classic	W 76–62	8–0	Los Angeles Memorial Sports Arena (5,047); Los Angeles, CA
Sat, Dec 29*; 10:00 p.m.	No. 2	vs. USC; Trojan-Bud Light Classic	W 75–73	9–0	Los Angeles Memorial Sports Arena (5,776); Los Angeles, CA
Sat, Jan 5; 3:30 p.m.	No. 2	at Virginia	W 63–58	10–0 (2–0)	University Hall (9,000); Charlottesville, VA
Wed, Jan 9*; 7:30 p.m.	No. 2	East Carolina	W 87–63	11–0	Cameron Indoor Stadium (8,564); Durham, NC
Sat, Jan 12*; 12:00 p.m.	No. 2	Washington	W 71–59	12–0	Cameron Indoor Stadium (8,564); Durham, NC
Mon, Jan 14; 8:00 p.m.	No. 2	at Maryland; Rivalry	L 76–78 ^{OT}	12–1 (2–1)	Cole Field House (14,500); College Park, MD
Thu, Jan 17; 9:00 p.m.	No. 2	Wake Forest	L 89–91 ^{OT}	12–2 (2–2)	Cameron Indoor Stadium (8,564); Durham, NC
Sat, Jan 19; 3:30 p.m.	No. 2	at No. 6 North Carolina; Rivalry	W 93–77	13–2 (3–2)	Carmichael Auditorium (10,000); Chapel Hill, NC
Wed, Jan 23; 7:30 p.m.	No. 5	at NC State	L 71–89	13–3 (3–3)	Reynolds Coliseum (12,400); Raleigh, NC
Sat, Jan 26; 3:30 p.m.	No. 5	at Clemson	W 100–83	14–3 (4–3)	Littlejohn Coliseum (8,500); Clemson, SC
Wed, Jan 30; 8:00 p.m.	No. 6	at Wake Forest	W 76–70 ^{OT}	15–3 (5–3)	Greensboro Coliseum (15,865); Greensboro, NC
Mon, Feb 4*	No. 6	Harvard	W 82–53	16–3	Cameron Indoor Stadium (8,564); Durham, NC
Wed, Feb 6; 7:30 p.m.	No. 5	at No. 10 Georgia Tech	L 71–81	16–4 (5–4)	Alexander Memorial Coliseum (7,366); Atlanta, GA
Sat, Feb 9; 3:00 p.m.	No. 5	Maryland	W 70–62	17–4 (6–4)	Cameron Indoor Stadium (8,564); Durham, NC
Wed, Feb 13*; 7:30 p.m.	No. 7	Stetson	W 94–51	18–4	Cameron Indoor Stadium (7,000); Durham, NC
Sat, Feb 16*; 1:00 p.m.	No. 7	vs. Notre Dame	W 81–69	19–4	Brendan Byrne Arena (15,201); East Rutherford, NJ
Wed, Feb 20; 7:30 p.m.	No. 6	NC State	L 66–70	19–5 (6–5)	Cameron Indoor Stadium (8,564); Durham, NC
Sat, Feb 23; 1:30 p.m.	No. 6	No. 8 Georgia Tech	W 67–62	20–5 (7–5)	Cameron Indoor Stadium (8,564); Durham, NC
Wed, Feb 27; 7:30 p.m.	No. 5	Clemson	W 90–73	21–5 (8–5)	Cameron Indoor Stadium (8,564); Durham, NC
Sat, Mar 2	No. 5	No. 8 North Carolina; Rivalry	L 68–78	21–6 (8–6)	Cameron Indoor Stadium (8,564); Durham, NC
ACC tournament
Fri, Mar 8*	No. 7	vs. Maryland; Quarterfinals	W 86–73	22–6	Omni Coliseum (16,723); Atlanta, GA
Sat, Mar 9*	No. 7	vs. No. 9 Georgia Tech; Semifinals	L 64–75	22–7	Omni Coliseum (16,723); Atlanta, GA
NCAA tournament
Fri, Mar 15*; ESPN	No. 10	vs. Pepperdine; First Round	W 75–62	23–7	Hofheinz Pavilion (8,000); Houston, TX
Sun, Mar 17*; CBS	No. 10	vs. Boston College; Second Round	L 73–74	23–8	Hofheinz Pavilion (6,800); Houston, TX
*Non-conference game. ^{#}Rankings from AP Poll. (#) Tournament seedings in parentheses.
