= 1984–85 North Carolina Tar Heels men's basketball team =

American college basketball season

1984–85 North Carolina Tar Heels men's basketball

ACC Regular Season co-champions

NCAA tournament, Elite Eight
- Conference: Atlantic Coast Conference

Ranking
- Coaches: No. 7
- AP: No. 7
- Record: 27–9 (9–5 ACC)
- Head coach: Dean Smith (23rd season)
- Assistant coaches: Bill Guthridge (17th season); Eddie Fogler (14th season); Roy Williams (7th season)
- Home arena: Carmichael Auditorium

1984–85 ACC men's basketball standings
	Conf.				Overall
Team	W		L	PCT	W		L	PCT
No. 6 Georgia Tech †	9	–	5	.643	27	–	8	.771
No. 7 North Carolina	9	–	5	.643	27	–	9	.750
No. 16 NC State	9	–	5	.643	23	–	10	.697
No. 10 Duke	8	–	6	.571	23	–	8	.742
Maryland	8	–	6	.571	25	–	12	.676
Clemson	5	–	9	.357	16	–	13	.552
Wake Forest	5	–	9	.357	15	–	14	.517
Virginia	3	–	11	.214	17	–	16	.515
† 1985 ACC tournament winner Rankings from AP Poll

The 1984–85 North Carolina Tar Heels men's basketball team represented the University of North Carolina at Chapel Hill.

Led by head coach Dean Smith, the Tar Heels won 27 games, reached the Elite Eight of the NCAA tournament, and achieved a top-ten ranking in the final AP poll.

== Schedule and results ==
Date time, TV	Rank^{#}	Opponent^{#}	Result	Record	Site city, state
Regular season
Dec 20, 1984*		vs. Wichita State	W 80–69	6–0	
Dec 22, 1984*		vs. Arizona State	W 85–66	7–0	
Dec 30, 1984*		vs. Missouri	L 76–81	7–1	
Mar 2, 1985	No. 8	at No. 5 Duke	W 78–68	22–7 (9–5)	Cameron Indoor Stadium (8,564); Durham, NC
ACC Tournament
Mar 8, 1985*	No. 6	vs. Wake Forest; ACC Tournament Quarterfinal	W 72–61 ^{OT}	23–7	Omni Coliseum; Atlanta, GA
Mar 9, 1985*	No. 6	vs. No. 18 NC State; ACC Tournament Semifinal	W 57–51	24–7	Omni Coliseum; Atlanta, GA
Mar 10, 1985*	No. 6	at No. 9 Georgia Tech; ACC Tournament Final	L 62–67	24–8	Omni Coliseum; Atlanta, GA
NCAA Tournament
Mar 14, 1985*	(2 SE) No. 7	vs. (15 SE) Middle Tennessee State; First round	W 76–57	25–8	Athletic & Convocation Center; South Bend, IN
Mar 16, 1985*	(2 SE) No. 7	at (7 SE) Notre Dame; Second Round	W 60–58	26–8	Athletic & Convocation Center; South Bend, IN
Mar 22, 1985*	(2 SE) No. 7	vs. (11 SE) Auburn; Southeast Regional semifinal	W 62–56	27–8	Birmingham–Jefferson Civic Center; Birmingham, AL
Mar 24, 1985*	(2 SE) No. 7	vs. (8 SE) Villanova; Southeast Regional Final	L 44–56	27–9	Birmingham-Jefferson Civic Center; Birmingham, AL
*Non-conference game. ^{#}Rankings from AP Poll. (#) Tournament seedings in parentheses. SE=Southeast region. All times are in Eastern Time.
