= 1984–85 Maryland Terrapins men's basketball team =

American college basketball season

1984–85 Maryland Terrapins men's basketball

NCAA tournament, Sweet Sixteen
- Conference: Atlantic Coast Conference
- Record: 25–12 (8–6 ACC)
- Head coach: Lefty Driesell
- Assistant coach: Sherman Dillard; Mel Cartwright; Ron Bradley
- Home arena: Cole Field House

1984–85 ACC men's basketball standings
	Conf.				Overall
Team	W		L	PCT	W		L	PCT
No. 6 Georgia Tech †	9	–	5	.643	27	–	8	.771
No. 7 North Carolina	9	–	5	.643	27	–	9	.750
No. 16 NC State	9	–	5	.643	23	–	10	.697
No. 10 Duke	8	–	6	.571	23	–	8	.742
Maryland	8	–	6	.571	25	–	12	.676
Clemson	5	–	9	.357	16	–	13	.552
Wake Forest	5	–	9	.357	15	–	14	.517
Virginia	3	–	11	.214	17	–	16	.515
† 1985 ACC tournament winner Rankings from AP Poll

The 1984–85 Maryland Terrapins men's basketball team represented the University of Maryland in the 1984–1985 college basketball season as a member of the Atlantic Coast Conference (ACC). The team was led by head coach Charles "Lefty" Driesell and played their home games at the Cole Field House. They finished 8–6 (tied for fourth place) in the ACC regular season.

The Terrapins lost to Duke in the first round of the ACC tournament. They received an at-large bid to the NCAA tournament, where they advanced to the Sweet 16.

== Roster ==
1984–85 Maryland Terrapins men's basketball team
Players
Coaches

Pos.	#	Name	Height	Weight	Year	Hometown
G	3	Keith Gatlin	6 ft 5 in (1.96 m)	165 lb (75 kg)	So	Grimesland, NC
G	10	Jeff Adkins	6 ft 5 in (1.96 m)	185 lb (84 kg)	Sr	Martinsville, VA
G	11	Chuck Driesell	6 ft 2 in (1.88 m)	170 lb (77 kg)	Sr	Silver Spring, MD
G	12	Jeff Baxter	6 ft 1 in (1.85 m)	165 lb (75 kg)	Jr	Washington, DC
G	22	Walter Lancaster	6 ft 4 in (1.93 m)	180 lb (82 kg)	Fr	Lanham, MD
G/F	24	Adrian Branch	6 ft 8 in (2.03 m)	185 lb (84 kg)	Sr	Largo, MD
C	31	Bryan Palmer	6 ft 10 in (2.08 m)	205 lb (93 kg)	So	Glen Rock, PA
F/C	32	Terry Long	6 ft 8 in (2.03 m)	240 lb (109 kg)	So	Glen Allen, VA
F	33	Derrick Lewis	6 ft 7 in (2.01 m)	195 lb (88 kg)	Fr	Temple Hills, MD
F	34	Len Bias	6 ft 8 in (2.03 m)	195 lb (88 kg)	Jr	Landover, MD
F	41	Tom Jones	6 ft 6 in (1.98 m)	205 lb (93 kg)	Jr	Oak Hill, WV
F	50	Ed Woods	6 ft 7 in (2.01 m)	210 lb (95 kg)	Fr	Rockville, MD

Head coach

- Charles "Lefty" Driesell

Assistant coach(es)

- Sherman Dillard
- Mel Cartwright
- Ron Bradley

Legend

- (C) Team captain
- (S) Suspended
- (I) Ineligible
- (W) Walk-on
- Injured
- Current redshirt

Roster

== Schedule ==
Date time, TV	Rank^{#}	Opponent^{#}	Result	Record	Site city, state
Regular season
November 23		vs. No. 19 Kansas; Great Alaska Shootout	L 56-58	0-1	Sullivan Arena; Anchorage, Alaska
November 24		vs. Alaska Anchorage; Great Alaska Shootout	W 54-52	1-1	Sullivan Arena; Anchorage, Alaska
November 25		vs. Tennessee; Great Alaska Shootout	W 72-49	2-1	Sullivan Arena; Anchorage, Alaska
December 1		West Virginia	W 56-47	3-1	Cole Field House; College Park, Maryland
December 5		Cleveland State	W 95-84	4-1	Cole Field House; College Park, Maryland
December 8		at Alabama	W 59-54	5-1	Memorial Coliseum; Tuscaloosa, Alabama
December 11		Ohio State	W 76-73	6-1	Cole Field House; College Park, Maryland
December 13		Maryland Eastern Shore	W 87-48	7-1	Cole Field House; College Park, Maryland
December 22		at Loyola (MD)	W 81-74	8-1	Baltimore, Maryland
December 25		vs. Iowa; Rainbow Classic	W 70-68 ^{OT}	9-1	Blaisdell Center; Honolulu, Hawaii
December 27		vs. Hawaii; Rainbow Classic	W 79-71	10-1	Blaisdell Center; Honolulu, Hawaii
December 28		vs. No. 10 Georgia Tech; Rainbow Classic	L 69-70	10-2	Blaisdell Center; Honolulu, Hawaii
January 2	No. 19	No. 17 NC State	W 58-56	11-2 (1-0)	Cole Field House; College Park, Maryland
January 5	No. 19	at Dayton	L 63-67	11-3	Dayton Arena; Dayton, Ohio
January 9		at No. 5 North Carolina	L 74-75	11-4 (1-1)	Dean Smith Center; Chapel Hill, North Carolina
January 14		No. 2 Duke	W 78-76 ^{OT}	12-4 (2-1)	Cole Field House; College Park, Maryland
January 16		Clemson	W 94-84	13-4 (3-1)	Cole Field House; College Park, Maryland
January 19		at UNLV	L 76-78	13-5	Thomas & Mack Center; Paradise, Nevada
January 21		Holy Cross	W 99-75	14-5	Cole Field House; College Park, Maryland
January 26		Notre Dame	W 77-65	15-5	Cole Field House; College Park, Maryland
January 27		No. 14 Villanova	W 77-74	16-5	Cole Field House; College Park, Maryland
January 30	No. 17	Virginia	W 71-58	17-5 (4-1)	Cole Field House; College Park, Maryland
February 2	No. 17	No. 8 Georgia Tech	L 60-72	17-6 (4-2)	Cole Field House; College Park, Maryland
February 4	No. 17	Old Dominion	W 87-75	18-6	Cole Field House; College Park, Maryland
February 6	No. 20	at Wake Forest	W 64-62	19-6 (5-2)	Winston-Salem Memorial Coliseum; Winston-Salem, North Carolina
February 9	No. 20	at No. 5 Duke	L 62-70	19-7 (5-3)	Cameron Indoor Stadium; Durham, North Carolina
February 13	No. 20	No. 13 North Carolina	L 54-60	19-8 (5-4)	Cole Field House; College Park, Maryland
February 17	No. 20	at Clemson	L 64-71	19-9 (5-5)	Littlejohn Coliseum; Clemson, South Carolina
February 19	No. 20	at No. 8 Georgia Tech	L 43-48	19-10 (5-6)	Alexander Memorial Coliseum; Atlanta, Georgia
February 21		Towson State	W 91-38	20-10	Cole Field House; College Park, Maryland
February 24		Wake Forest	W 69-66	21-10 (6-6)	Cole Field House; College Park, Maryland
February 27		at No. 16 NC State	W 71-70	22-10 (7-6)	Reynolds Coliseum; Raleigh, North Carolina
March 3		at Virginia	W 60-55	23-10 (8-6)	University Hall; Charlottesville, Virginia
ACC Tournament
March 8		vs. No. 7 Duke	L 73-86	23-11	Omni Coliseum; Atlanta, Georgia
NCAA Tournament
March 15	(5 SE)	vs. (12 SE) Miami (OH); First round	W 69-68 ^{OT}	24-11	Dayton Arena; Dayton, Ohio
March 17	(5 SE)	vs. (13 SE) Navy; Second Round	W 64-59	25-11	Dayton Arena; Dayton, Ohio
March 22	(5 SE)	vs. (8 SE) Villanova; Regional semifinal	L 43-46	25-12	Birmingham Coliseum; Birmingham, Alabama
*Non-conference game. ^{#}Rankings from AP Poll. (#) Tournament seedings in parentheses. SE=Southeast.

== Awards and honors ==
- Len Bias
  - ACC Player of the Year
  - Consensus Second-team All-American
