= Cedric Lewis =

American basketball player

Personal information
- Born: September 24, 1969 (age 57) Washington, D.C., U.S.
- Listed height: 6 ft 10 in (2.08 m)
- Listed weight: 235 lb (107 kg)

Career information
- High school: Archbishop Carroll (Washington, D.C.)
- College: Maryland (1987–1991)
- NBA draft: 1991: undrafted
- Playing career: 1991–1997
- Position: Center
- Number: 42

Career history
- 1991–1992: Grand Rapids Hoops
- 1992: Albany Patroons
- 1992–1993: La Crosse Catbirds
- 1993–1994: Montpellier Paillade Basket
- 1995–1996: Brandt Hagen
- 1996: Washington Bullets
- 1996–1997: Omaha Racers
- Stats at NBA.com
- Stats at Basketball Reference

Cedric Lewis (born September 24, 1969) is an American former basketball player. A 6'10" center from the University of Maryland, Lewis played three games for the Washington Bullets in the 1995–96 NBA season, scoring four points.
