= 1985 ACC men's basketball tournament =

- Classification: Division I
- Season: 1984–85
- Teams: 8
- Site: Omni Coliseum; Atlanta, Georgia
- Champions: Georgia Tech (1st title)
- Winning coach: Bobby Cremins (1st title)
- MVP: Mark Price (Georgia Tech)
- Television: Raycom Sports/Jefferson-Pilot Teleproductions (within the ACC Footprint; entire Tournament); ESPN (outside the ACC Footprint; quarterfinals and Semifinals); NBC Sports (Outside the ACC Footprint; Finals)

1984–85 ACC men's basketball standings
	Conf.				Overall
Team	W		L	PCT	W		L	PCT
No. 6 Georgia Tech †	9	–	5	.643	27	–	8	.771
No. 7 North Carolina	9	–	5	.643	27	–	9	.750
No. 16 NC State	9	–	5	.643	23	–	10	.697
No. 10 Duke	8	–	6	.571	23	–	8	.742
Maryland	8	–	6	.571	25	–	12	.676
Clemson	5	–	9	.357	16	–	13	.552
Wake Forest	5	–	9	.357	15	–	14	.517
Virginia	3	–	11	.214	17	–	16	.515
† 1985 ACC tournament winner Rankings from AP Poll

The 1985 Atlantic Coast Conference men's basketball tournament was held in Atlanta, Georgia, at the Omni Coliseum from March 8 to 10. Georgia Tech defeated North Carolina, 57–54, to win the championship, the first for the Yellow Jackets. Mark Price of Georgia Tech was named the tournament MVP.

== Bracket ==
Quarterfinals; March 8 Raycom/JP, ESPN
1	9 Georgia Tech	55
8	Virginia	48
4	7 Duke	86
5	Maryland	73
2	6 North Carolina	72^{OT}
7	Wake Forest	61
3	18 NC State	70
6	Clemson	63

Semifinals; March 9 Raycom/JP, ESPN
1	9 Georgia Tech	75
4	7 Duke	64
2	6 North Carolina	57
3	18 NC State	51

Championship Game; March 10; Raycom JP, NBC
1	9 Georgia Tech	57
2	6 North Carolina	54
