= 1984–85 North Carolina A&T Aggies men's basketball team =

American college basketball season

1984–85 North Carolina A&T Aggies men's basketball

MEAC regular season champions MEAC tournament champions

NCAA tournament, First Round
- Conference: Mid-Eastern Athletic Conference
- Record: 19–10 (10–2 MEAC)
- Head coach: Don Corbett (6th season)
- Home arena: Corbett Sports Center

1984–85 MEAC men's basketball standings
	Conf.				Overall
Team	W		L	PCT	W		L	PCT
North Carolina A&T †	10	–	2	.833	19	–	10	.655
Howard	9	–	3	.750	15	–	11	.577
Delaware State	8	–	4	.667	12	–	17	.414
South Carolina State	7	–	4	.636	11	–	16	.407
Bethune–Cookman	4	–	7	.364	8	–	19	.296
Maryland Eastern Shore	2	–	10	.167	3	–	25	.107
Morgan State	1	–	11	.083	3	–	25	.107
† 1985 MEAC tournament winner Rankings from AP Poll

The 1984–85 North Carolina A&T Aggies men's basketball team represented North Carolina Agricultural and Technical State University during the 1984–85 NCAA Division I men's basketball season. The Aggies, led by 6th-year head coach Don Corbett, played their home games at the Corbett Sports Center as members of the Mid-Eastern Athletic Conference. They finished the season 19–10, 10–2 in MEAC play to finish in first place. They were champions of the MEAC tournament, winning the championship game over Howard, to earn an automatic bid to the 1985 NCAA tournament where they were defeated by No. 1 seed Oklahoma, 96–83, in the opening round.

== Roster ==
1984–85 North Carolina A&T Aggies men's basketball team
Players
Coaches

Pos.	#	Name	Height	Weight	Year	Hometown
G		George Cale	6 ft 6 in (1.98 m)	—	So
G	34	Eric Boyd	6 ft 4 in (1.93 m)	—	Sr
F		Claude Williams	6 ft 7 in (2.01 m)	—	Fr

Head coach

- Don Corbett

Assistant coach(es)

Legend

- (C) Team captain
- (S) Suspended
- (I) Ineligible
- (W) Walk-on
- Injured
- Current redshirt

== Schedule and results ==
Date time, TV	Rank^{#}	Opponent^{#}	Result	Record	Site (attendance) city, state
Regular season
Dec 5, 1984*		at No. 10 NC State	L 54–101	0–1	Reynolds Coliseum; Raleigh, North Carolina
1985 MEAC tournament
Mar 8, 1985*		vs. Bethune-Cookman; Semifinals	W 97–75	18–9	The Palestra; Philadelphia, Pennsylvania
Mar 9, 1985*		vs. Howard; Championship game	W 71–69	19–9	The Palestra; Philadelphia, Pennsylvania
1985 NCAA tournament
Mar 14, 1985*	(16 MW)	vs. (1 MW) No. 4 Oklahoma; First round	L 83–96	19–10	Mabee Center; Tulsa, Oklahoma
*Non-conference game. ^{#}Rankings from AP Poll. (#) Tournament seedings in parentheses. ME=Mideast. All times are in Eastern Time.

== Awards and honors ==
- Eric Boyd – MEAC Player of the Year
