= 1984–85 Wisconsin Badgers men's basketball team =

American college basketball season

1984–85 Wisconsin Badgers men's basketball
- Conference: Big Ten Conference
- Record: 14–14 (5–13 Big Ten)
- Head coach: Steve Yoder (3rd season)
- Home arena: UW Fieldhouse

1984–85 Big Ten Conference men's basketball standings
	Conf.				Overall
Team	W		L	PCT	W		L	PCT
No. 2 Michigan	16	–	2	.889	26	–	4	.867
No. 12 Illinois	12	–	6	.667	26	–	9	.743
Purdue	11	–	7	.611	20	–	9	.690
Ohio State	11	–	7	.611	20	–	10	.667
Iowa	10	–	8	.556	21	–	11	.656
Michigan State	10	–	8	.556	19	–	10	.655
Indiana	7	–	11	.389	19	–	14	.576
Minnesota	6	–	12	.333	13	–	15	.464
Wisconsin	5	–	13	.278	14	–	14	.500
Northwestern	2	–	16	.111	6	–	22	.214
Rankings from AP Poll

The 1984–85 Wisconsin Badgers men's basketball team represented University of Wisconsin–Madison. The head coach was Steve Yoder, coaching his third season with the Badgers. The team played their home games at the UW Fieldhouse in Madison, Wisconsin and was a member of the Big Ten Conference.

== Roster ==
1984–85 Wisconsin Badgers men's basketball team
Players
Coaches

Pos.	#	Name	Height	Weight	Year	Hometown
G	10	Mike Heineman	6 ft 3 in (1.91 m)	185 lb (84 kg)	So	Connersville, Indiana
G	12	Rick Olson	6 ft 1 in (1.85 m)	165 lb (75 kg)	Jr	Madison, Wisconsin
F	14	Don Harris	5 ft 10 in (1.78 m)	165 lb (75 kg)	Fr	Indianapolis, Indiana
F	22	Jack Hippen	6 ft 7 in (2.01 m)	205 lb (93 kg)	Sr	Chadwick, Illinois
G	24	Shelton Smith, Jr.	6 ft 0 in (1.83 m)	170 lb (77 kg)	Fr	Indianapolis, Indiana
F	32	Scott Roth	6 ft 9 in (2.06 m)	210 lb (95 kg)	Sr	Brecksville, Ohio
F	40	J.J. Weber	6 ft 7 in (2.01 m)	215 lb (98 kg)	So	Wales, Wisconsin
F	41	Robert Barnes	6 ft 8 in (2.03 m)	225 lb (102 kg)	Fr	Racine, Wisconsin
F	42	Rod Ripley	6 ft 7 in (2.01 m)	175 lb (79 kg)	So	Pulaski, Wisconsin
F	44	Gregg Steinhaus	6 ft 8 in (2.03 m)	185 lb (84 kg)	Jr	Portage, Wisconsin
C	50	John Ploss	6 ft 9 in (2.06 m)	220 lb (100 kg)	Sr	Antioch, Illinois
F	54	Jay Laszewski	6 ft 8 in (2.03 m)	190 lb (86 kg)	Jr	Stevens Point, Wisconsin

Head coach

- Steve Yoder (Illinois Wesleyan)

Assistant coach(es)

- Rick Bowen (Indiana)
- Brad McNulty (Purdue)
- Ray McCallum (Ball State)

Legend

- (C) Team captain
- (S) Suspended
- (I) Ineligible
- (W) Walk-on
- Injured
- Current redshirt

== Schedule ==
Date time, TV	Rank^{#}	Opponent^{#}	Result	Record	Site city, state
Regular Season
11/25/1984*		Morgan State	W 93–78	1–0	UW Fieldhouse; Madison, WI
12/1/1984*		Washington State	W 61–59	2–0	UW Fieldhouse; Madison, WI
12/3/1984*		Kentucky State	W 88–74	3–0	UW Fieldhouse; Madison, WI
12/6/1984*		South Dakota	W 96–56	4–0	UW Fieldhouse; Madison, WI
12/8/1984*		Central Michigan	W 74–63	5–0	UW Fieldhouse; Madison, WI
12/12/1984*		at Nebraska	L 51–53	5–1	Bob Devaney Sports Center; Lincoln, NE
12/14/1984*		Dartmouth	W 90–70	6–1	UW Fieldhouse; Madison, WI
12/22/1984*		vs. Northern Illinois	W 83–71	7–1	MetroCentre; Rockford, IL
12/28/1984*		vs. Texas A&M; Lobo Invitational	W 71–69	8–1	University Arena; Albuquerque, NM
12/29/1984*		New Mexico; Lobo Invitational	W 83–74	9–1	University Arena; Albuquerque, NM
1/5/1985		at Northwestern	W 52–51	10–1 (1–0)	Welsh–Ryan Arena; Evanston, IL
1/9/1985		at Ohio State	L 88–99	10–2 (1–1)	St. John Arena; Columbus, OH
1/12/1985		at No. 11 Indiana	L 68–90	10–3 (1–2)	Assembly Hall; Bloomington, IN
1/17/1985		No. 11 Illinois	L 67–78	10–4 (1–3)	UW Fieldhouse; Madison, WI
1/19/1985		Purdue	L 68–72	10–5 (1–4)	UW Fieldhouse; Madison, WI
1/24/1985		at Minnesota	L 62–72	10–6 (1–5)	Williams Arena; Minneapolis, MN
1/26/1985		at Iowa	L 65–105	10–7 (1–6)	Carver–Hawkeye Arena; Iowa City, IA
1/31/1985		Michigan State	L 68–77	10–8 (1–7)	UW Fieldhouse; Madison, WI
2/2/1985		No. 10 Michigan	L 81–94	10–9 (1–8)	UW Fieldhouse; Madison, WI
2/7/1985		Indiana	L 54–58	10–10 (1–9)	UW Fieldhouse; Madison, WI
2/9/1985		Ohio State	W 92–78	11–10 (2–9)	UW Fieldhouse; Madison, WI
2/14/1985		at Purdue	L 52–67	11–11 (2–10)	Mackey Arena; West Lafayette, IN
2/16/1985		No. 17 Illinois	L 49–68	11–12 (2–11)	Assembly Hall; Champaign, IL
2/20/1985		No. 14 Iowa	W 54–53	12–12 (3–11)	UW Fieldhouse; Madison, WI
2/24/1985		Minnesota	W 65–61	13–12 (4–11)	UW Fieldhouse; Madison, WI
2/28/1985		No. 3 Michigan	L 68–88	13–13 (4–12)	Crisler Arena; Ann Arbor, MI
3/2/1985		Michigan State	L 63–83	13–14 (4–13)	Breslin Center; East Lansing, MI
3/9/1985		Northwestern	W 61–51	14–14 (5–13)	UW Fieldhouse; Madison, WI
*Non-conference game. ^{#}Rankings from AP Poll. (#) Tournament seedings in parentheses.
