= 1984–85 Purdue Boilermakers men's basketball team =

American college basketball season

1984–85 Purdue Boilermakers men's basketball

NCAA tournament
- Conference: Big Ten Conference
- Record: 20–9 (11–7 Big Ten)
- Head coach: Gene Keady (5th season)
- Assistant coaches: Bruce Weber (5th season); Kevin Stallings (3rd season)
- Home arena: Mackey Arena

1984–85 Big Ten Conference men's basketball standings
	Conf.				Overall
Team	W		L	PCT	W		L	PCT
No. 2 Michigan	16	–	2	.889	26	–	4	.867
No. 12 Illinois	12	–	6	.667	26	–	9	.743
Purdue	11	–	7	.611	20	–	9	.690
Ohio State	11	–	7	.611	20	–	10	.667
Iowa	10	–	8	.556	21	–	11	.656
Michigan State	10	–	8	.556	19	–	10	.655
Indiana	7	–	11	.389	19	–	14	.576
Minnesota	6	–	12	.333	13	–	15	.464
Wisconsin	5	–	13	.278	14	–	14	.500
Northwestern	2	–	16	.111	6	–	22	.214
Rankings from AP Poll

The 1984–85 Purdue Boilermakers men's basketball team represented Purdue University during the 1984–85 college basketball season. Led by head coach Gene Keady, the team played their home games at Mackey Arena in West Lafayette, Indiana. The Boilermakers finished third in the Big Ten standings and received an at-large bid to the NCAA tournament as No. 6 seed in the Southeast Region. Purdue was upset in the opening round by Auburn, 59–58, to finish the season with a 20–9 record (11–7 Big Ten).

== Roster ==
1984–85 Purdue Boilermakers men's basketball team
Players
Coaches

Pos.	#	Name	Height	Weight	Year	Hometown
G	11	Mack Gadis	6 ft 1 in (1.85 m)	—	Jr	Indianapolis, Indiana
F	15	Jim Bullock	6 ft 6 in (1.98 m)	210 lb (95 kg)	Sr
G	21	Everette Stephens	6 ft 2 in (1.88 m)	175 lb (79 kg)	Fr	Evanston, Illinois
G	23	Troy Lewis	6 ft 7 in (2.01 m)	205 lb (93 kg)	Fr	Toledo, Ohio
F	33	Todd Mitchell	6 ft 4 in (1.93 m)	190 lb (86 kg)	Fr	Anderson, Indiana

Head coach

- Gene Keady (Kansas State)

Assistant coach(es)

- Bruce Weber (Milwaukee)
- Kevin Stallings (Purdue)

Legend

- (C) Team captain
- (S) Suspended
- (I) Ineligible
- (W) Walk-on
- Injured
- Current redshirt

== Schedule and results ==
Date time, TV	Rank^{#}	Opponent^{#}	Result	Record	Site city, state
Non-conference regular season
Dec 1, 1984*		Kentucky	W 66–56	2–0	Mackey Arena; West Lafayette, Indiana
Dec 5, 1984*		Miami (OH)	L 79–84	2–1	Mackey Arena; West Lafayette, Indiana
Dec 8, 1984*		South Carolina	W 85–63	3–1	Mackey Arena; West Lafayette, Indiana
Dec 17, 1984*		Evansville	W 82–57	5–1	Mackey Arena; West Lafayette, Indiana
Dec 20, 1984*		Southern Illinois	W 75–66	6–1	Mackey Arena; West Lafayette, Indiana
Dec 28, 1984*		vs. Mississippi State; Sun Bowl Classic	W 77–46	8–1	Special Events Center; El Paso, Texas
Dec 29, 1984*		at UTEP; Sun Bowl Classic	W 74–64	9–1	Special Events Center; El Paso, Texas
Big Ten Regular Season
Jan 3, 1985		at Iowa	L 63–75	9–2 (0–1)	Carver-Hawkeye Arena; Iowa City, Iowa
Jan 5, 1985		at Minnesota	W 74–65	10–2 (1–1)	Williams Arena; Minneapolis, Minnesota
Jan 10, 1985		No. 17 Michigan State	L 72–81	10–3 (1–2)	Mackey Arena; West Lafayette, Indiana
Jan 12, 1985		Michigan	L 65–81	10–4 (1–3)	Mackey Arena; West Lafayette, Indiana
Jan 16, 1985		at Northwestern	W 50–49	11–4 (2–3)	Welsh-Ryan Arena; Evanston, Illinois
Jan 19, 1985		at Wisconsin	W 72–68	12–4 (3–3)	Wisconsin Field House; Madison, Wisconsin
Jan 24, 1985		No. 13 Indiana	W 62–52	13–4 (4–3)	Mackey Arena; West Lafayette, Indiana
Jan 26, 1985		Ohio State	L 63–67	13–5 (4–4)	Mackey Arena; West Lafayette, Indiana
Jan 30, 1985		No. 5 Illinois	W 54–34	14–5 (5–4)	Mackey Arena; West Lafayette, Indiana
Feb 7, 1985		at No. 8 Michigan	L 84–95	14–6 (5–5)	Crisler Arena; Ann Arbor, Michigan
Feb 9, 1985		at Michigan State	W 66–65	15–6 (6–5)	Jenison Field House; East Lansing, Michigan
Feb 14, 1985		Wisconsin	W 67–52	16–6 (7–5)	Mackey Arena; West Lafayette, Indiana
Feb 16, 1985		Northwestern	W 76–57	17–6 (8–5)	Mackey Arena; West Lafayette, Indiana
Feb 21, 1985		at Ohio State	L 68–86	17–7 (8–6)	St. John Arena; Columbus, Ohio
Feb 23, 1985		at Indiana	W 72–63	18–7 (9–6)	Assembly Hall; Bloomington, Indiana
Mar 2, 1985		at No. 18 Illinois	L 43–86	18–8 (9–7)	Assembly Hall; Champaign, Illinois
Mar 7, 1985		Minnesota	W 79–67	19–8 (10–7)	Mackey Arena; West Lafayette, Indiana
Mar 9, 1985		Iowa	W 60–54	20–8 (11–7)	Mackey Arena; West Lafayette, Indiana
NCAA Tournament
Mar 14, 1985*	(6 SE)	vs. (11 SE) Auburn; First round	L 58–59	20–9	Joyce Center; Notre Dame, Indiana
*Non-conference game. ^{#}Rankings from AP Poll. (#) Tournament seedings in parentheses.
