= 1984–85 Old Dominion Monarchs basketball team =

American college basketball season

1984–85 Old Dominion Monarchs basketball

NCAA tournament, First Round
- Conference: Sun Belt Conference
- Record: 19–12 (9–5 Sun Belt)
- Head coach: Paul Webb (10th season)
- Home arena: Norfolk Scope; Hampton Coliseum (alternate)

1984–85 Sun Belt Conference men's basketball standings
	Conf.				Overall
Team	W		L	PCT	W		L	PCT
No. 11 VCU †	12	–	2	.857	26	–	6	.813
UAB	11	–	3	.786	25	–	9	.735
Old Dominion	9	–	5	.643	19	–	12	.613
South Florida	6	–	8	.429	18	–	12	.600
Jacksonville	6	–	8	.429	15	–	14	.517
South Alabama	6	–	8	.429	15	–	13	.536
Western Kentucky	5	–	9	.357	14	–	14	.500
UNC Charlotte	1	–	13	.071	5	–	23	.179
† 1985 Sun Belt Conference tournament winner Rankings from AP Poll

The 1984–85 Old Dominion Monarchs basketball team represented Old Dominion University in the 1984–85 college basketball season. This was head coach Paul Webb's 10th and final season at Old Dominion. The Monarchs compete in the Sun Belt Conference and played their home games at the ODU Fieldhouse. They finished the season 19–12, 9–5 in Sun Belt play to finish in third place during the regular season. They reached the championship game of the 1985 Sun Belt Conference men's basketball tournament to earn an at-large bid to the NCAA tournament. As No. 12 seed in the East Region where they were beaten by 5 seed SMU in the opening round.

== Roster ==
1984–85 Old Dominion Monarchs men's basketball team
Players
Coaches

Pos.	#	Name	Height	Weight	Year	Hometown
F		Mark Davis	6 ft 6 in (1.98 m)	190 lb (86 kg)	Sr	Chesapeake, Virginia
C		Kenny Gattison	6 ft 8 in (2.03 m)	220 lb (100 kg)	Jr	Wilmington, North Carolina

Head coach

- Paul Webb

Assistant coach(es)

Legend

- (C) Team captain
- (S) Suspended
- (I) Ineligible
- (W) Walk-on
- Injured
- Current redshirt

== Schedule and results ==
Date time, TV	Rank^{#}	Opponent^{#}	Result	Record	Site (attendance) city, state
Exhibition
Nov 17, 1984*		Yugoslavia	W 67–60	–	Norfolk Scope (3,632); Norfolk, Virginia
Regular season
Nov 24, 1984*		at No. 15 Virginia Tech	L 76–102	0–1	Cassell Coliseum (8,463); Blacksburg, Virginia
Nov 28, 1984*		VMI	W 56–50	1–1	Norfolk Scope (3,480); Norfolk, Virginia
Nov 30, 1984*		South Carolina Aiken	W 107–72	2–1	Norfolk Scope (4,011); Norfolk, Virginia
Dec 5, 1984*		Saint Joseph's	W 87–63	3–1	Norfolk Scope (3,533); Norfolk, Virginia
Dec 8, 1984*		at William & Mary	W 62–57	4–1	Kaplan Arena (5,120); Williamsburg, Virginia
Dec 15, 1984*		James Madison	W 66–57	5–1	Norfolk Scope (4,982); Norfolk, Virginia
Dec 27, 1984*		vs. No. 5 St. John's; ECAC Holiday Festival	L 66–77	5–2	Madison Square Garden (12,570); New York, New York
Dec 29, 1984*		vs. Rutgers; ECAC Holiday Festival	W 82–80	6–2	Madison Square Garden (15,090); New York, New York
Jan 2, 1985		at South Alabama	W 86–84	7–2 (1–0)	Jaguar Gym (3,118); Mobile, Alabama
Jan 5, 1985		at Western Kentucky	L 67–73	7–3 (1–1)	E. A. Diddle Arena (8,000); Bowling Green, Kentucky
Jan 8, 1985*		at James Madison	L 68–80	7–4	Convocation Center (4,400); Harrisonburg, Virginia
Jan 10, 1985		UNC Charlotte	W 86–60	8–4 (2–1)	Norfolk Scope (3,307); Norfolk, Virginia
Jan 12, 1985		Western Kentucky	W 84–76	9–4 (3–1)	Norfolk Scope (4,825); Norfolk, Virginia
Jan 14, 1985*		at No. 10 DePaul	L 58–64	9–5	Rosemont Horizon (11,752); Rosemont, Illinois
Jan 17, 1985		South Florida	W 74–62	10–5 (4–1)	Norfolk Scope (3,037); Norfolk, Virginia
Jan 24, 1985		UAB	L 55–56	10–6 (4–2)	Norfolk Scope (5,021); Norfolk, Virginia
Jan 26, 1985		South Alabama	W 86–74	11–6 (5–2)	Norfolk Scope (6,289); Norfolk, Virginia
Jan 31, 1985		at No. 20 UAB	W 59–58	12–6 (6–2)	Birmingham-Jefferson Civic Center (12,032); Birmingham, Alabama
Feb 2, 1985		Jacksonville	L 78–79 ^{OT}	12–7 (6–3)	Norfolk Scope (6,532); Norfolk, Virginia
Feb 4, 1985*		at No. 17 Maryland	L 75–87	12–8	Cole Field House (10,125); College Park, Maryland
Feb 7, 1985		at South Florida	W 75–73	13–8 (7–3)	Sun Dome (3,507); Tampa, Florida
Feb 9, 1985		at Jacksonville	W 67–65	14–8 (8–3)	Jacksonville Coliseum (7,869); Jacksonville, Florida
Feb 14, 1985		at UNC Charlotte	W 80–64	15–8 (9–3)	Charlotte Coliseum (1,086); Charlotte, North Carolina
Feb 16, 1985		at VCU; Rivalry	L 71–90	15–9 (9–4)	Richmond Coliseum (10,716); Richmond, Virginia
Feb 18, 1985*		Dayton	W 91–82	16–9	Norfolk Scope (4,119); Norfolk, Virginia
Feb 20, 1985*		William & Mary	W 72–58	17–9	Norfolk Scope (3,863); Norfolk, Virginia
Feb 25, 1985		No. 17 VCU; Rivalry	L 66–78	17–10 (9–5)	Norfolk Scope (5,478); Norfolk, Virginia
Sun Belt tournament
Mar 1, 1985*	(3)	vs. (6) South Alabama; Quarterfinals	W 84–66	18–10	Hampton Coliseum (8,522); Hampton, Virginia
Mar 2, 1985*	(3)	vs. (2) UAB; Semifinals	W 68–67	19–10	Hampton Coliseum (9,558); Hampton, Virginia
Mar 3, 1985*	(3)	vs. (1) No. 17 VCU; Championship game	L 82–87	19–11	Hampton Coliseum (9,804); Hampton, Virginia
NCAA tournament
Mar 14, 1985*	(12 E)	vs. (5 E) Southern Methodist; First round	L 68–85	19–12	Hartford Civic Center; Hartford, Connecticut
*Non-conference game. ^{#}Rankings from AP poll. (#) Tournament seedings in parentheses. E=East. All times are in Eastern Time.

== NBA draft ==
Round	Pick	Player	NBA club
4	79	Mark Davis	Cleveland Cavaliers

== See also ==
- 1984–85 Old Dominion Lady Monarchs basketball team
