= 1984–85 Indiana Hoosiers men's basketball team =

American college basketball season

1984–85 Indiana Hoosiers men's basketball

National Invitation Tournament, Runner up
- Conference: Big Ten Conference
- Record: 19–14 (7–11 Big Ten)
- Head coach: Bobby Knight (14th season)
- Captains: Dan Dakich; Uwe Blab
- Home arena: Assembly Hall

1984–85 Big Ten Conference men's basketball standings
	Conf.				Overall
Team	W		L	PCT	W		L	PCT
No. 2 Michigan	16	–	2	.889	26	–	4	.867
No. 12 Illinois	12	–	6	.667	26	–	9	.743
Purdue	11	–	7	.611	20	–	9	.690
Ohio State	11	–	7	.611	20	–	10	.667
Iowa	10	–	8	.556	21	–	11	.656
Michigan State	10	–	8	.556	19	–	10	.655
Indiana	7	–	11	.389	19	–	14	.576
Minnesota	6	–	12	.333	13	–	15	.464
Wisconsin	5	–	13	.278	14	–	14	.500
Northwestern	2	–	16	.111	6	–	22	.214
Rankings from AP Poll

The 1984–85 Indiana Hoosiers men's basketball team represented Indiana University. Their head coach was Bobby Knight, who was in his 14th year. The team played its home games in Assembly Hall in Bloomington, Indiana, and was a member of the Big Ten Conference.

The Hoosiers finished the regular season with an overall record of 19–14 and a conference record of 7–11, finishing 7th in the Big Ten Conference. Missing out on the NCAA Tournament, IU was invited to participate in the 1985 NIT; IU advanced to the championship game, but they lost to the UCLA Bruins.

== Olympics ==
Prior to the start of the season, Bobby Knight was the head coach of the US Olympic Basketball Team at the 1984 Summer Olympics. Steve Alford was a member of the gold medal-winning team. Hoosiers trainer Tim Garl was the trainer of the Olympic team.

== Roster ==
No.	Name	Position	Ht.	Year	Hometown
11	Dan Dakich	G	6–5	Sr.	Merrillville, Indiana
12	Steve Alford	G	6–2	So.	New Castle, Indiana
14	Magnus Pelkowski	C	6–10	Fr.	Bogotá, Colombia
21	Winston Morgan	G/F	6–5	Jr.	Anderson, Indiana
22	Stew Robinson	G	6–1	Jr.	Anderson, Indiana
23	Delray Brooks	G	6–4	Fr.	Michigan City, Indiana
24	Daryl Thomas	F/C	6–7	So.	Westchester, Illinois
30	Todd Meier	F/C	6–8	So.	Oshkosh, Wisconsin
32	Steve Eyl	F	6–6	Fr.	Hamilton, Ohio
33	Uwe Blab	C	7–2	Sr.	Munich, Germany
41	Mike Giomi	F	6–8	Jr.	Newark, Ohio
42	Kreigh Smith	G/F	6–7	Fr.	Tipton, Indiana
44	Joe Hillman	G	6–2	Fr.	Glendale, California
45	Brian Sloan	F/C	6–8	Fr.	McLeansboro, Illinois
50	Marty Simmons	G/F	6–5	So.	Lawrenceville, Illinois
52	Courtney Witte	F/C	6–8	RS Sr.	Vincennes, Indiana

=== Player stats ===
Player	Games	Field goals	Three pointers	Free throws	Rebounds	Blocks	Steals	Points
Steve Alford	32	232	N/A	116	101	0	44	580
Uwe Blab	33	212	N/A	105	207	72	15	529

== Schedule/results ==
Date time, TV	Rank^{#}	Opponent^{#}	Result	Record	Site city, state
Regular season
11/24/1984*	No. 4	No. 17 Louisville	L 64–75	0–1	Assembly Hall; Bloomington, Indiana
12/1/1984*	No. 12	Ohio	W 90–73	1–1	Assembly Hall; Bloomington, Indiana
12/4/1984*	No. 11	at Notre Dame	L 63–74	1–2	Joyce Center; Notre Dame, Indiana
12/8/1984*; NBC	No. 11	Kentucky; Indiana–Kentucky rivalry	W 81–68	2–2	Assembly Hall; Bloomington, Indiana
12/11/1984*	No. 16	at Iowa State	W 69–67	3–2	Hilton Coliseum; Ames, Iowa
12/14/1984*	No. 16	Western Kentucky; Indiana Classic	W 80–57	4–2	Assembly Hall; Bloomington, Indiana
12/15/1984*	No. 16	St. Joseph (Pa.); Indiana Classic	W 81–44	5–2	Assembly Hall; Bloomington, Indiana
12/22/1984*	No. 16	at Kansas State	W 70–58	6–2	Ahearn Field House; Manhattan, Kansas
12/29/1984*	No. 15	vs. Miami (OH); Hoosier Classic	W 77–72	7–2	Market Square Arena; Indianapolis
12/30/1984*	No. 15	vs. Florida; Hoosier Classic	W 80–63	8–2	Market Square Arena; Indianapolis
1/2/1985	No. 12	at No. 16 Michigan	W 87–62	9–2 (1–0)	Crisler Arena; Ann Arbor, Michigan
1/5/1985	No. 12	at Michigan State	L 61–68	9–3 (1–1)	Jenison Fieldhouse; East Lansing, Michigan
1/10/1985	No. 11	Northwestern	W 77–50	10–3 (2–1)	Assembly Hall; Bloomington, Indiana
1/12/1985	No. 11	Wisconsin	W 90–68	11–3 (3–1)	Assembly Hall; Bloomington, Indiana
1/19/1985	No. 8	at Ohio State	L 84–86	11–4 (3–2)	St. John Arena; Columbus, Ohio
1/24/1985	No. 13	at Purdue; Rivalry	L 52–62	11–5 (3–3)	Mackey Arena; West Lafayette, Indiana
1/27/1985	No. 13	at No. 6 Illinois; Rivalry	L 41–52	11–6 (3–4)	Assembly Hall; Champaign, Illinois
1/31/1985		Iowa	L 59–72	11–7 (3–5)	Assembly Hall; Bloomington, Indiana
2/2/1985		Minnesota	W 89–66	12–7 (4–5)	Assembly Hall; Bloomington, Indiana
2/7/1985		at Wisconsin	W 58–54	13–7 (5–5)	Wisconsin Field House; Madison, Wisconsin
2/9/1985		at Northwestern	W 78–59	14–7 (6–5)	Welsh-Ryan Arena; Evanston, Illinois
2/14/1985		Ohio State	L 63–72	14–8 (6–6)	Assembly Hall; Bloomington, Indiana
2/21/1985		No. 16 Illinois; Rivalry	L 50–66	14–9 (6–7)	Assembly Hall; Bloomington, Indiana
2/23/1985		Purdue; Rivalry	L 63–72	14–10 (6–8)	Assembly Hall; Bloomington, Indiana
2/28/1985		at Minnesota	W 79–68	15–10 (7–8)	Williams Arena; Minneapolis
3/3/1985		at Iowa	L 50–70	15–11 (7–9)	Carver–Hawkeye Arena; Iowa City, Iowa
3/7/1985		Michigan State	L 58–68	15–12 (7–10)	Assembly Hall; Bloomington, Indiana
3/10/1985		No. 3 Michigan	L 71–73	15–13 (7–11)	Assembly Hall; Bloomington, Indiana
NIT
3/15/1985*		Butler; First Round	W 79–57	16–13 (7–11)	Assembly Hall; Bloomington, Indiana
3/19/1985*		Richmond; Second Round	W 75–53	17–13 (7–11)	Assembly Hall; Bloomington, Indiana
3/24/1985*		Marquette; Quarterfinals	W 94–82	18–13 (7–11)	Assembly Hall; Bloomington, Indiana
3/27/1985*		vs. Tennessee; Semifinals	W 74–67	19–13 (7–11)	Madison Square Garden; New York City
3/29/1985*		vs. UCLA; Championship	L 62–65	19–14 (7–11)	Madison Square Garden; New York City
*Non-conference game. ^{#}Rankings from AP Poll. (#) Tournament seedings in parentheses.

== Team players drafted into the NBA ==
Round	Pick	Player	NBA club
1	17	Uwe Blab	Dallas Mavericks
