= 1984–85 Northeastern Huskies men's basketball team =

American college basketball season

1984–85 Northeastern Huskies men's basketball

ECAC North Regular-season champion ECAC North Conference tournament champion

NCAA tournament, First Round
- Conference: Eastern College Athletic Conference-North
- Record: 22–9 (13–3 ECAC-North)
- Head coach: Jim Calhoun (13th season)
- Assistant coaches: Karl Fogel; Kevin Stacom; J. Keith Motley
- Home arena: Matthews Arena

1984–85 ECAC North men's basketball standings
	Conf.				Overall
Team	W		L	PCT	W		L	PCT
Canisius	13	–	3	.813	20	–	10	.667
Northeastern †	13	–	3	.813	22	–	9	.710
Siena	12	–	4	.750	22	–	7	.759
Niagara	11	–	5	.688	16	–	12	.571
Boston University	9	–	7	.563	15	–	15	.500
Vermont	5	–	11	.313	9	–	19	.321
Maine	5	–	11	.313	11	–	17	.393
New Hampshire	4	–	12	.250	7	–	22	.241
Colgate	0	–	16	.000	5	–	21	.192
Hartford		–		–	7	–	21	.250
† 1985 ECAC North tournament winner

The 1984–85 Northeastern Huskies men's basketball team represented Northeastern University during the 1984–85 college basketball season. Led by head coach Jim Calhoun, the Huskies competed in the ECAC North Conference and played their home games at Matthews Arena. They finished the season 22–9 overall with a 13–3 mark in ECAC North play to win the regular season conference title. They followed the regular season by winning the ECAC North Conference tournament to earn a bid to the NCAA tournament as No. 14 seed in the East region. The Huskies were defeated in the opening round by No. 3 seed Illinois, 76–57.

== Roster ==
1984–85 Northeastern Huskies men's basketball team
Players
Coaches

Pos.	#	Name	Height	Weight	Year	Previous school	Hometown
G	10	Skeeter Bryant	6 ft 3 in (1.91 m)	185 lb (84 kg)	Sr	Hope HS	Providence, Rhode Island
G	11	Enndy Basquiat	6 ft 4 in (1.93 m)	190 lb (86 kg)	Jr	Spring Valley HS	Brooklyn, New York
G	20	Andre LaFleur	6 ft 3 in (1.91 m)	180 lb (82 kg)	So	Gov. Dummer Academy	Los Angeles, California
F	21	Wes Fuller	6 ft 5 in (1.96 m)	190 lb (86 kg)	So	Camden HS	Camden, New Jersey
F	23	Steve Evans	6 ft 5 in (1.96 m)	185 lb (84 kg)	Sr	Weequahic HS	Newark, New Jersey
G/F	35	Reggie Lewis	6 ft 7 in (2.01 m)	185 lb (84 kg)	So	Paul Laurence Dunbar HS	Baltimore, Maryland

Head coach

- Jim Calhoun

Assistant coach(es)

- Karl Fogel
- Kevin Stacom
- J. Keith Motley

Legend

- (C) Team captain
- (S) Suspended
- (I) Ineligible
- (W) Walk-on
- Injured
- Current redshirt

== Schedule and results ==
Date time, TV	Rank^{#}	Opponent^{#}	Result	Record	Site city, state
Regular season
Nov 28, 1984		at Vermont	W 71–52	1–0 (1–0)	Patrick Gym; Burlington, Vermont
Jan 5, 1985*		Suffolk	W 128–72	2–0	Matthews Arena; Boston, Massachusetts
Dec 7, 1984*		vs. Arkansas–Little Rock	W 70–63	3–0	Dahlberg Arena; Missoula, Montana
Dec 8, 1984*		at Montana	L 80–81	3–1	Dahlberg Arena; Missoula, Montana
Dec 15, 1984*		at UMass	L 66–67	3–2	Curry Hicks Cage; Amherst, Massachusetts
Dec 28, 1984*		vs. Illinois State; Fleet Classic	L 84–92	3–3	Providence Civic Center (6,349); Providence, Rhode Island
Dec 29, 1984*		vs. West Texas A&M; Fleet Classic	L 74–81	3–4	Providence Civic Center; Providence, Rhode Island
Jan 3, 1985		at Maine	W 89–71	4–4 (2–0)	Alfond Arena; Orono, Maine
Jan 5, 1985		Niagara	W 73–70	5–4 (3–0)	Matthews Arena; Boston, Massachusetts
Jan 8, 1985		Maine	W 94–70	6–4 (4–0)	Matthews Arena; Boston, Massachusetts
Jan 12, 1985		at Siena	W 88–68	7–4 (5–0)	Alumni Recreation Center; Loudonville, New York
Jan 17, 1985*		Keene State	W 108–68	8–4	Matthews Arena; Boston, Massachusetts
Jan 19, 1985		Colgate	W 63–56	9–4 (6–0)	Matthews Arena; Boston, Massachusetts
Jan 22, 1985*		Fairfield	W 92–67	10–4	Matthews Arena; Boston, Massachusetts
Jan 24, 1985*		New Hampshire	L 55–57	10–5 (6–1)	Matthews Arena; Boston, Massachusetts
Jan 26, 1985		at Canisius	L 65–67	10–6 (6–2)	Koessler Athletic Center; Buffalo, New York
Jan 28, 1985		at Niagara	L 80–85	10–7 (6–3)	Buffalo Memorial Auditorium; Lewiston, New York
Jan 30, 1985*		Boston College	L 75–82	10–8	Matthews Arena; Boston, Massachusetts
Feb 5, 1985		Canisius	W 99–91	11–8 (7–3)	Matthews Arena; Boston, Massachusetts
Feb 7, 1985		at Colgate	W 54–45	12–8 (8–3)	Cotterell Court; Hamilton, New York
Feb 9, 1985		Boston University	W 74–62	13–8 (9–3)	Matthews Arena; Boston, Massachusetts
Feb 16, 1985*		vs. Ohio State	W 76–74	14–8	
Feb 18, 1985*		at Hartford	W 75–59	15–8	Hartford Civic Center; Hartford, Connecticut
Feb 20, 1985		Vermont	W 88–62	16–8 (10–3)	Matthews Arena; Boston, Massachusetts
Feb 22, 1985		at New Hampshire	W 78–70	17–8 (11–3)	Lundholm Gym; Durham, New Hampshire
Feb 25, 1985		Siena	W 72–63	18–8 (12–3)	Matthews Arena; Boston, Massachusetts
Feb 28, 1985		at Boston University	W 80–69	19–8 (13–3)	Case Gym; Boston, Massachusetts
ECAC North tournament
Mar 4, 1985*		Maine; Quarterfinals	W 103–81	20–8	Matthews Arena; Boston, Massachusetts
Mar 5, 1985*		Siena; Semifinals	W 73–69	21–8	Matthews Arena; Boston, Massachusetts
Mar 6, 1985*		Boston University; Championship game	W 68–67	22–8	Matthews Arena; Boston, Massachusetts
NCAA Tournament
Mar 15, 1985*	(14 E)	vs. (3 E) No. 12 Illinois; First round	L 57–76	22–9	The Omni (14,311); Atlanta, Georgia
*Non-conference game. ^{#}Rankings from AP poll. (#) Tournament seedings in parentheses. E=East.

== Awards and honors ==
- Reggie Lewis – ECAC North Player of the Year
