= 1984–85 Virginia Tech Hokies men's basketball team =

American college basketball season

1984–85 Virginia Tech Hokies men's basketball

NCAA tournament
- Conference: Metro Conference (1975–1995)
- Record: 20–9 (10–4 Metro)
- Head coach: Charles Moir (9th season)
- Home arena: Cassell Coliseum

1984–85 Metro Conference men's basketball standings
| | Conf. | | | | Overall |
| Team | W | | L | PCT | W | | L | PCT |
|---|---|---|---|---|---|---|---|---|
| No. 5 Memphis State † | 13 | – | 1 | .929 | 31 | – | 4 | .886 |
| Virginia Tech | 10 | – | 4 | .714 | 20 | – | 9 | .690 |
| Cincinnati | 8 | – | 6 | .571 | 17 | – | 14 | .548 |
| South Carolina | 6 | – | 8 | .429 | 15 | – | 13 | .536 |
| Tulane | 6 | – | 8 | .429 | 15 | – | 13 | .536 |
| Louisville | 6 | – | 8 | .429 | 19 | – | 18 | .514 |
| Florida State | 4 | – | 10 | .286 | 14 | – | 16 | .467 |
| Southern Miss | 3 | – | 11 | .214 | 7 | – | 21 | .250 |
† 1985 Metro Conference tournament winner Rankings from AP Poll

The 1984–85 Virginia Tech Hokies men's basketball team represented Virginia Polytechnic Institute and State University from Blacksburg, Virginia as members of the Metro Conference during the 1984–85 season. The Hokies were led by head coach Charles Moir and played their home games at Cassell Coliseum in Blacksburg, Virginia. After finishing second in the Metro regular season standings, Virginia Tech was knocked off in the quarterfinals of the conference tournament. The Hokies still secured an at-large bid to the NCAA tournament. As No. 9 seed in the East region, the team was beaten by Temple in the opening round.

== Roster ==
1984–85 Virginia Tech Hokies men's basketball team
Players
Coaches

| Pos. | # | Name | Height | Weight | Year | Hometown |
|---|---|---|---|---|---|---|
| F/C | 44 | Bobby Beecher | 6 ft 9 in (2.06 m) | 220 lb (100 kg) | Jr | Lawsonville, NC |
| C | 54 | Roy Bow | 6 ft 11 in (2.11 m) | 200 lb (91 kg) | Fr | Saint Croix, VI |
| G | 30 | Dell Curry | 6 ft 5 in (1.96 m) | 195 lb (88 kg) | Jr | Grottoes, VA |
| G | 33 | Ron Everhart | 6 ft 3 in (1.91 m) | 185 lb (84 kg) | Sr | Fairmont, WV |
| F | 20 | Craig Eversoll | 6 ft 6 in (1.98 m) | 180 lb (82 kg) | So | Bowling Green, KY |
| G | 15 | Tim Lewis | 6 ft 0 in (1.83 m) | 160 lb (73 kg) | Sr | Richmond, VA |
| G | 22 | Perry Young | 6 ft 5 in (1.96 m) | 205 lb (93 kg) | Sr | Baltimore, MD |
| G | 21 | Al Young | 6 ft 0 in (1.83 m) | 190 lb (86 kg) | Sr | Hickory, NC |

Head coach

- Charles Moir (Appalachian State)

Assistant coach(es)

Legend

- (C) Team captain
- (S) Suspended
- (I) Ineligible
- (W) Walk-on
- Injured
- Current redshirt

Roster

== Schedule and results ==
| Date time, TV | Rank^{#} | Opponent^{#} | Result | Record | Site city, state |
Regular Season
| Nov 24, 1984* | No. 15 | Old Dominion | W 102–76 | 1–0 | Cassell Coliseum; Blacksburg, Virginia |
| Dec 1, 1984* | No. 15 | Charleston | W 98–87 | 2–0 | Cassell Coliseum; Blacksburg, Virginia |
| Dec 3, 1984* | No. 14 | Maryland-Eastern Shore | W 91–46 | 3–0 | Cassell Coliseum; Blacksburg, Virginia |
| Dec 8, 1984* | No. 14 | South Carolina State | W 108–65 | 4–0 | Cassell Coliseum; Blacksburg, Virginia |
| Dec 14, 1984* | No. 11 | vs. Iowa State; Volunteer Classic | W 80–53 | 5–0 | Stokely Athletic Center; Knoxville, Tennessee |
| Dec 15, 1984* | No. 11 | at Tennessee; Volunteer Classic | L 75–86 | 5–1 | Stokely Athletic Center; Knoxville, Tennessee |
| Dec 19, 1984* | No. 11 | Rider | W 107–74 | 6–1 | Cassell Coliseum; Blacksburg, Virginia |
| Dec 22, 1984* | No. 17 | at West Virginia | W 65–63 | 7–1 | WVU Coliseum; Morgantown, West Virginia |
| Dec 28, 1984* | No. 16 | vs. James Madison; Times–Dispatch Invitational | W 47–37 | 8–1 | Richmond Coliseum; Richmond, Virginia |
| Dec 29, 1984* | No. 16 | at VCU; Times–Dispatch Invitational | L 65–69 | 8–2 | Richmond Coliseum; Richmond, Virginia |
| Jan 2, 1985* | | vs. Virginia | L 59–67 | 8–3 | Norfolk, Virginia |
| Jan 5, 1985* | | North Carolina A&T | W 92–67 | 9–3 | Cassell Coliseum; Blacksburg, Virginia |
| Jan 12, 1985 | | South Carolina | W 109–68 | 9–3 (1–0) | Cassell Coliseum; Blacksburg, Virginia |
| Jan 14, 1985 | | Florida State | W 85–71 | 10–3 (2–0) | Cassell Coliseum; Blacksburg, Virginia |
| Jan 19, 1985 | | at Southern Miss | W 72–68 | 11–3 (3–0) | Reed Green Coliseum; Hattiesburg, Mississippi |
| Jan 21, 1985 | | at Tulane | W 66–58 | 12–3 (4–0) | Avron B. Fogelman Arena; New Orleans, Louisiana |
| Jan 26, 1985 | | No. 4 Memphis State | L 79–89 | 12–4 (4–1) | Cassell Coliseum; Blacksburg, Virginia |
| Jan 28, 1985 | | at Louisville | W 81–61 | 13–4 (5–1) | Freedom Hall; Louisville, Kentucky |
| Jan 30, 1985* | | Morgan State | W 98–66 | 14–4 | Cassell Coliseum; Blacksburg, Virginia |
| Feb 2, 1985 | | at No. 3 Memphis State | L 82–91 | 14–5 (5–2) | Mid-South Coliseum; Memphis, Tennessee |
Metro Tournament
| Mar 7, 1985* | | vs. Florida State; Quarterfinals | L 93–97 | 20–8 | Freedom Hall; Louisville, Kentucky |
NCAA Tournament
| Mar 14, 1985* | (9 E) | vs. (8 E) Temple | L 57–60 | 20–9 | Hartford Civic Center; Hartford, Connecticut |
*Non-conference game. ^{#}Rankings from AP Poll. (#) Tournament seedings in parentheses.
