= 1984–85 Michigan Wolverines men's basketball team =

American college basketball season

1984–85 Michigan Wolverines men's basketball

Big Ten regular season champions

NCAA tournament, Round of 32
- Conference: Big Ten Conference

Ranking
- Coaches: No. 2
- AP: No. 2
- Record: 26–4 (16–2 Big Ten)
- Head coach: Bill Frieder
- Assistant coaches: Mike Boyd; Steve Fisher; David Hammer
- MVP: Roy Tarpley
- Captains: Leslie Rockymore; Butch Wade
- Home arena: Crisler Arena

1984–85 Big Ten Conference men's basketball standings
	Conf.				Overall
Team	W		L	PCT	W		L	PCT
No. 2 Michigan	16	–	2	.889	26	–	4	.867
No. 12 Illinois	12	–	6	.667	26	–	9	.743
Purdue	11	–	7	.611	20	–	9	.690
Ohio State	11	–	7	.611	20	–	10	.667
Iowa	10	–	8	.556	21	–	11	.656
Michigan State	10	–	8	.556	19	–	10	.655
Indiana	7	–	11	.389	19	–	14	.576
Minnesota	6	–	12	.333	13	–	15	.464
Wisconsin	5	–	13	.278	14	–	14	.500
Northwestern	2	–	16	.111	6	–	22	.214
Rankings from AP Poll

The 1984–85 Michigan Wolverines men's basketball team represented the University of Michigan in intercollegiate college basketball during the 1984–85 season. The team played its home games in the Crisler Arena in Ann Arbor, Michigan, and was a member of the Big Ten Conference. Under the direction of head coach Bill Frieder, the team won the Big Ten Conference by a four game margin. The team earned the number one seed in the 1985 NCAA Division I men's basketball tournament where it advanced one round before losing. Although the team began the season unranked it was in the Associated Press Top Twenty Poll a total of twelve of the seventeen weeks, including a peak of number two where it ended the season, and it also ended the season ranked number two in the final UPI Coaches' Poll. During the season, the team led the Big Ten Conference in scoring margin (8.8) and Roy Tarpley led the conference in rebound with a 9.9 average in conference games. Leslie Rockymore and Butch Wade served as team captains and Tarpley earned team MVP. Tarpley earned 1985 NCAA All-American recognition.

For the first of five consecutive seasons, the team set the school record for single-season field goal percentage with a 51.3% (941-for-1834) performance. Antoine Joubert's single-season total of 164 assists established a school record that would be eclipsed the following season by Gary Grant. It surpassed Eric Turner's 160 total set in 1983. Grant had 7 steals on January 19, 1985, against Iowa, which tied Rickey Green and Turner for the best single-game totals in school history. Roy Tarpley surpassed his school single-season blocked shots average record of 2.09 set the prior season with an average of 2.20. He would rebreak this record the following season. On February 7, 1985, against Purdue, Tarpley totaled 7 blocks in a game to earn the school single-game record that he would rebreak ten months later.

On January 12, 1985, the team began a 17-game winning streak against the Purdue that continued through a March 15 victory over Fairleigh Dickinson in the NCAA tournament. This is tied as the longest winning streak in school history (With the 2018-19 season), surpassing the January 29, 1921 – January 6, 1922 14-game streak. On January 5, 1985, the team began a 24-game home winning streak against Ohio State that continued through a February 15, 1986, victory over Iowa. This stands as the longest home winning streak in school history, surpassing the 22-game January 12, 1976 – November 30, 1977, streak. The streak ended with a February 20, 1986 74–59 loss to Michigan State. January 12 also marked the start of a 10-game road winning streak that continued through a January 4, 1986, victory over Ohio State. This stands as the longest road winning streak in school history, surpassing two 7-game streaks that ended in 1921. The streak ended with a January 16, 1986 73–63 loss to Minnesota.

In the 64-team NCAA Division I men's basketball tournament, number one seeded Michigan advanced one round by defeating Fairleigh Dickinson 59–55. In the second round the team was upset by eight-seeded Villanova 59–55. The team was led in scoring and rebounds by Tarpley in both NCAA tournament games.

== Schedule and results ==
Date time, TV	Rank^{#}	Opponent^{#}	Result	Record	Site city, state
Regular Season
Nov 26, 1984*		Detroit Mercy	W 80–66	1–0	Crisler Arena; Ann Arbor, Michigan
Dec 1, 1984*		Georgia	W 63–57	2–0	Crisler Arena; Ann Arbor, Michigan
Dec 5, 1984*		Youngstown State	W 103–73	3–0	Crisler Arena; Ann Arbor, Michigan
Dec 8, 1984*		at Dayton	W 87–78	4–0	University of Dayton Arena; Dayton, Ohio
Dec 10, 1984*		Western Michigan	W 83–59	5–0	Crisler Arena; Ann Arbor, Michigan
Dec 12, 1984*	No. 20	Eastern Michigan	W 83–72	6–0	Crisler Arena; Ann Arbor, Michigan
Dec 17, 1984*	No. 18	Alcorn State	W 84–81	7–0	Crisler Arena; Ann Arbor, Michigan
Dec 22, 1984*	No. 18	Rutgers	W 93–77	8–0	Crisler Arena; Ann Arbor, Michigan
Dec 29, 1984*	No. 13	at Tennessee	L 77–81	8–1	Stokely Athletic Center; Knoxville, Tennessee
Jan 2, 1985*	No. 16	No. 12 Indiana	L 62–87	8–2 (0–1)	Crisler Arena; Ann Arbor, Michigan
Jan 5, 1985	No. 16	Ohio State	W 87–82	9–2 (1–1)	Crisler Arena; Ann Arbor, Michigan
Jan 10, 1985		at No. 15 Illinois	L 58–64	9–3 (1–2)	Assembly Hall; Champaign, Illinois
Jan 12, 1985		at Purdue	W 81–65	10–3 (2–2)	Mackey Arena; West Lafayette, Indiana
Jan 17, 1985		Minnesota	W 97–56	11–3 (3–2)	Crisler Arena; Ann Arbor, Michigan
Jan 19, 1985		Iowa	W 69–67 ^{3OT}	12–3 (4–2)	Crisler Arena; Ann Arbor, Michigan
Jan 24, 1985	No. 18	Michigan State	W 86–75	13–3 (5–2)	Crisler Arena; Ann Arbor, Michigan
Jan 27, 1985*	No. 18	No. 15 Kansas	W 96–77	14–3	Crisler Arena; Ann Arbor, Michigan
Jan 31, 1985	No. 10	at Northwestern	W 76–52	15–3 (6–2)	Welsh-Ryan Arena; Evanston, Illinois
Feb 2, 1985	No. 10	at Wisconsin	W 94–81	16–3 (7–2)	Wisconsin Field House; Madison, Wisconsin
Feb 7, 1985	No. 8	Purdue	W 95–84	17–3 (8–2)	Crisler Arena; Ann Arbor, Michigan
Feb 9, 1985	No. 8	No. 9 Illinois	W 57–45	18–3 (9–2)	Crisler Arena; Ann Arbor, Michigan
Feb 14, 1985	No. 3	at No. 11 Iowa	W 56–52	19–3 (10–2)	Carver-Hawkeye Arena; Iowa City, Iowa
Feb 16, 1985	No. 3	at Minnesota	W 66–54	20–3 (11–2)	Williams Arena; Minneapolis, Minnesota
Feb 21, 1985	No. 3	at Michigan State	W 75–73	21–3 (12–2)	Jenison Field House; East Lansing, Michigan
Feb 28, 1985	No. 3	Wisconsin	W 88–68	22–3 (13–2)	Crisler Arena; Ann Arbor, Michigan
Mar 2, 1985	No. 3	Northwestern	W 87–66	23–3 (14–2)	Crisler Arena; Ann Arbor, Michigan
Mar 6, 1985	No. 3	at Ohio State	W 77–72	24–3 (15–2)	St. John Arena; Columbus, Ohio
Mar 10, 1985	No. 3	at Indiana	W 73–71	25–3 (16–2)	Assembly Hall; Bloomington, Indiana
NCAA Tournament
Mar 15, 1985*	(1 SE) No. 2	vs. (16 SE) Fairleigh Dickinson; First round	W 59–55	26–3	University of Dayton Arena; Dayton, Ohio
Mar 17, 1985*	(1 SE) No. 2	vs. (8 SE) Villanova; Second round	L 55–59	26–4	University of Dayton Arena; Dayton, Ohio
*Non-conference game. ^{#}Rankings from AP Poll. (#) Tournament seedings in parentheses. SE=Southeast.

== Rankings ==
Ranking movements Legend: ██ Increase in ranking ██ Decrease in ranking
	Week																
Poll	Pre	1	2	3	4	5	6	7	8	9	10	11	12	13	14	15	Final
AP Poll				20	18	13	16			18	10	8	3	3	3	3	2

== Team players drafted into the NBA ==
Seven players from this team were selected in the NBA draft.

Year	Round	Pick	Overall	Player	NBA club
1986	1	7	7	Roy Tarpley	Dallas Mavericks
1986	5	2	95	Richard Rellford	Indiana Pacers
1986	6	1	117	Butch Wade	New York Knicks
1986	7	5	144	Robert Henderson	Chicago Bulls
1987	6	20	135	Antoine Joubert	Detroit Pistons
1988	1	15	15	Gary Grant	Seattle SuperSonics

== See also ==
- NCAA men's Division I tournament bids by school
- NCAA men's Division I tournament bids by school and conference
- NCAA Division I men's basketball tournament all-time team records
