= 1984–85 Iowa Hawkeyes men's basketball team =

American college basketball season

1984–85 Iowa Hawkeyes men's basketball

Amana-Hawkeye Classic Champions

NCAA tournament, First Round
- Conference: Big Ten Conference
- Record: 21–11 (10–8 Big Ten)
- Head coach: George Raveling (2nd season)
- Assistant coaches: Joedy Gardner; Brian Hammel
- MVPs: Greg Stokes; Michael Payne
- Home arena: Carver-Hawkeye Arena

1984–85 Big Ten Conference men's basketball standings
	Conf.				Overall
Team	W		L	PCT	W		L	PCT
No. 2 Michigan	16	–	2	.889	26	–	4	.867
No. 12 Illinois	12	–	6	.667	26	–	9	.743
Purdue	11	–	7	.611	20	–	9	.690
Ohio State	11	–	7	.611	20	–	10	.667
Iowa	10	–	8	.556	21	–	11	.656
Michigan State	10	–	8	.556	19	–	10	.655
Indiana	7	–	11	.389	19	–	14	.576
Minnesota	6	–	12	.333	13	–	15	.464
Wisconsin	5	–	13	.278	14	–	14	.500
Northwestern	2	–	16	.111	6	–	22	.214
Rankings from AP Poll

The 1984–85 Iowa Hawkeyes men's basketball team represented the University of Iowa as members of the Big Ten Conference. The team was led by second-year head coach George Raveling and played their home games at Carver-Hawkeye Arena in Iowa City, Iowa. They finished the season 21–11, 10–8 in Big Ten play to finish in a tie for fifth place. The Hawkeyes received an at-large bid to the NCAA tournament as the No. 8 seed in the West Region, losing in the First Round to Arkansas.

== Previous season ==
The Hawkeyes finished the 1983–84 season 13–15 and 6–12 in Big Ten play to finish tied for eighth place.

== Roster ==
1984–85 Iowa Hawkeyes men's basketball team
Players
Coaches

Pos.	#	Name	Height	Weight	Year	Hometown
F/C	3	Gerry Wright	6 ft 7 in (2.01 m)	—	So	San Bernardino, California
G	4	Andre Banks	6 ft 4 in (1.93 m)	—	Jr	Chicago, Illinois
G	5	Bart Casey	6 ft 5 in (1.96 m)	—	Fr	Iowa City, Iowa
G	10	Michael Reaves	6 ft 3 in (1.91 m)	—	Fr	Milledgeville, Georgia
G	11	Kenny Fullard	5 ft 11 in (1.8 m)	—	Sr	Raytown, Missouri
G/F	14	Bill Jones	6 ft 7 in (2.01 m)	—	Fr	Detroit, Michigan
G	20	Jeff Moe	6 ft 3 in (1.91 m)	—	Fr	Indianapolis, Indiana
G	24	Michael Morgan	6 ft 3 in (1.91 m)	—	Fr	Haughton, Louisiana
G	25	Todd Berkenpas	6 ft 2 in (1.88 m)	—	Sr	Mapleton, Iowa
F	32	Dave Snedeker	6 ft 8 in (2.03 m)	—	So	Springfield, Illinois
F	40	Kent Hill	6 ft 6 in (1.98 m)	—	Fr	Wichita, Kansas
F/C	41	Greg Stokes	6 ft 10 in (2.08 m)	—	Sr	Hamilton, Ohio
C	42	Michael Payne	6 ft 11 in (2.11 m)	—	Sr	Quincy, Illinois
F	44	Al Lorenzen	6 ft 9 in (2.06 m)	—	Fr	Cedar Rapids, Iowa
F/C	54	Brad Lohaus (redshirt)	6 ft 11 in (2.11 m)	—	RS So	Phoenix, Arizona

Head coach

- George Raveling (Villanova)

Assistant coach(es)

- Joedy Gardner (West Virginia)

Legend

- (C) Team captain
- (S) Suspended
- (I) Ineligible
- (W) Walk-on
- Injured
- Current redshirt

== Schedule and results ==
Date time, TV	Rank^{#}	Opponent^{#}	Result	Record	Site city, state
Non-conference regular season
11/24/1984*		Arkansas-Little Rock	W 76–47	1–0	Carver-Hawkeye Arena; Iowa City, IA
11/26/1984*		Gonzaga	W 62–40	2–0	Carver-Hawkeye Arena; Iowa City, IA
11/28/1984*		Morehead State	W 89–46	3–0	Carver-Hawkeye Arena; Iowa City, IA
12/1/1984*		George Mason	W 111–82	4–0	Carver-Hawkeye Arena; Iowa City, IA
12/4/1984*; 7:35 pm		Iowa State; Rivalry	L 50–54	4–1	Carver-Hawkeye Arena (15,450); Iowa City, IA
12/7/1984*		Boston University; Amana-Hawkeye Classic	W 67–53	5–1	Carver-Hawkeye Arena; Iowa City, IA
12/8/1984*		Texas Tech; Amana-Hawkeye Classic	W 58–48	6–1	Carver-Hawkeye Arena; Iowa City, IA
12/12/1984*		Georgia State	W 89–40	7–1	Carver-Hawkeye Arena; Iowa City, IA
12/15/1984*		Illinois Wesleyan	W 99–39	8–1	Carver-Hawkeye Arena (15,450); Iowa City, IA
12/22/1984*		South Carolina	W 88–78	9–1	Carver-Hawkeye Arena; Iowa City, IA
12/25/1984*		vs. Maryland; Rainbow Classic	L 68–70 ^{OT}	9–2	Honolulu International Center; Honolulu, HI
12/26/1984*		vs. Cornell; Rainbow Classic	W 59–56 ^{OT}	10–2	Honolulu International Center; Honolulu, HI
12/27/1984*		vs. Arkansas; Rainbow Classic	W 71–52	11–2	Honolulu International Center; Honolulu, HI
Big Ten regular season
1/3/1985		Purdue	W 75–63	12–2 (1–0)	Carver-Hawkeye Arena (15,450); Iowa City, IA
1/5/1985		No. 6 Illinois	W 64-60	13-2 (2-0)	Carver-Hawkeye Arena (15,450); Iowa City, IA
1/12/1985	No. 19	at Minnesota	L 57-65	13-3 (2-1)	Williams Arena; Minneapolis, MN
1/17/1985		at No. 19 Michigan State	W 79-65	14-3 (3-1)	Jenison Fieldhouse; East Lansing, MI
1/19/1985		at Michigan	L 67-69 ^{3 OT}	14-4 (3-2)	Crisler Arena (13,069); Ann Arbor, MI
1/24/1985		Northwestern	W 66-47	15-4 (4-2)	Carver-Hawkeye Arena; Iowa City, IA
1/26/1985		Wisconsin	W 105-65	16-4 (5-2)	Carver-Hawkeye Arena (15,450); Iowa City, IA
1/31/1985		at Indiana	W 72-59	17-4 (6-2)	Assembly Hall (17,035); Bloomington, IN
2/2/1985		at Ohio State	W 67-58	18-4 (7-2)	St. John Arena (13,681); Columbus, OH
2/6/1987	No. 12	Minnesota	W 70-65	19-4 (8-2)	Carver-Hawkeye Arena (15,450); Iowa City, IA
2/14/1985	No. 11	No. 3 Michigan	L 52-56	19-5 (8-3)	Carver-Hawkeye Arena (15,450); Iowa City, IA
2/16/1985	No. 11	Michigan State	L 55-57	19-6 (8-4)	Carver-Hawkeye Arena (15,450); Iowa City, IA
2/20/1985	No. 14	at Wisconsin	L 53-54	19-7 (8-5)	Wisconsin Field House; Madison, WI
2/23/1985	No. 14	at Northwestern	L 58-78	19-8 (8-6)	Welsh-Ryan Arena; Evanston, IL
2/28/1985		Ohio State	W 87-82	20-8 (9-6)	Carver-Hawkeye Arena; Iowa City, IA
3/3/1985		Indiana	W 70-50	21-8 (10-6)	Carver-Hawkeye Arena; Iowa City, IA
3/7/1985		at No. 14 Illinois	L 53-59	21-9 (10-7)	Assembly Hall; Champaign, IL
3/9/1985		at Purdue	L 54–60	21–10 (10–8)	Mackey Arena; West Lafayette, IN
NCAA Tournament
3/14/1985*	(8 W)	vs. (9 W) Arkansas; First Round	L 54–63	21–11	Jon M. Huntsman Center (6,928); Salt Lake City, UT
*Non-conference game. ^{#}Rankings from AP Poll. (#) Tournament seedings in parentheses. W=West Region.

== Team players in the 1985 NBA draft ==
Round	Pick	Player	NBA club
2	33	Greg Stokes	Philadelphia 76ers
