= 1985 ECAC North men's basketball tournament =

- Classification: Division I
- Season: 1984–85
- Teams: 9
- Champions: Northeastern (4th title)
- Winning coach: Jim Calhoun (4th title)
- MVP: Reggie Lewis (Northeastern)
- ECAC North men's basketball tournaments

1984–85 ECAC North men's basketball standings
	Conf.				Overall
Team	W		L	PCT	W		L	PCT
Canisius	13	–	3	.813	20	–	10	.667
Northeastern †	13	–	3	.813	22	–	9	.710
Siena	12	–	4	.750	22	–	7	.759
Niagara	11	–	5	.688	16	–	12	.571
Boston University	9	–	7	.563	15	–	15	.500
Vermont	5	–	11	.313	9	–	19	.321
Maine	5	–	11	.313	11	–	17	.393
New Hampshire	4	–	12	.250	7	–	22	.241
Colgate	0	–	16	.000	5	–	21	.192
Hartford		–		–	7	–	21	.250
† 1985 ECAC North tournament winner

The 1985 America East men's basketball tournament was hosted by the higher seeds in head-to-head matchups. The final was held at Matthews Arena on the campus of the Northeastern University. Northeastern gained its second consecutive and fourth overall America East Conference Championship and an automatic berth to the NCAA tournament with its win over Boston University. Northeastern was given the 14th seed in the East Regional of the NCAA Tournament and lost in the first round to Illinois 76–57. Canisius College gained a bid to the NIT and lost in the first round to Nebraska 79–66.

== Bracket and Results ==
First round
8	New Hampshire	53
9	Colgate	47

Second round
1	Canisius	90
8	New Hampshire	56
4	Niagara	68
5	Boston U.	69
2	Northeastern	103
7	Maine	81
3	Siena	65
6	Vermont	56

Semifinals
1	Canisius	56
5	Boston U.	64
2	Northeastern	73
3	Siena	69

Finals
5	Boston U.	67
2	Northeastern	68

== See also ==
- America East Conference
