= 1984–85 Michigan State Spartans men's basketball team =

American college basketball season

1984–85 Michigan State Spartans men's basketball

Spartan Cutlass Classic champions

NCAA tournament, First Round
- Conference: Big Ten Conference

Ranking
- Coaches: No. 20
- Record: 19–10 (10–8 Big Ten)
- Head coach: Jud Heathcote (9th season)
- Assistant coaches: Tom Izzo; Mike Deane; Herb Williams
- Captains: Sam Vincent; Richard Mudd
- Home arena: Jenison Fieldhouse

1984–85 Big Ten Conference men's basketball standings
	Conf.				Overall
Team	W		L	PCT	W		L	PCT
No. 2 Michigan	16	–	2	.889	26	–	4	.867
No. 12 Illinois	12	–	6	.667	26	–	9	.743
Purdue	11	–	7	.611	20	–	9	.690
Ohio State	11	–	7	.611	20	–	10	.667
Iowa	10	–	8	.556	21	–	11	.656
Michigan State	10	–	8	.556	19	–	10	.655
Indiana	7	–	11	.389	19	–	14	.576
Minnesota	6	–	12	.333	13	–	15	.464
Wisconsin	5	–	13	.278	14	–	14	.500
Northwestern	2	–	16	.111	6	–	22	.214
Rankings from AP Poll

The 1984–85 Michigan State Spartans men's basketball team represented Michigan State University in the 1984–85 NCAA Division I men's basketball season. The team played their home games at Jenison Field House in East Lansing, Michigan and were members of the Big Ten Conference. They were coached by Jud Heathcote in his ninth year at Michigan State. The Spartans finished with a record of 19–10, 10–8 in Big Ten play to finish in fifth place. They received an at-large bid to the newly-expanded, 64-team NCAA tournament as the No. 10 seed in the Midwest region. It marked the school's first trip to the NCAA tournament since 1979 when they won the championship. There they lost to UAB in the First Round.

== Previous season ==
The Spartans finished the 1983–84 season with a record of 15–13, 8–10 to finish in a tie for fifth place in Big Ten play.

== Roster and statistics ==
1984–85 Michigan State Spartans men's basketball team
No	Name	Pos	Year	Height	Pts	Reb	Ast
11	Sam Vincent	G	SR	6–2	23.0	3.9	4.0
4	Scott Skiles	G	JR	6–1	17.7	3.2	5.8
00	Ken Johnson	C	SR	6–8	10.8	10.2	0.6
35	Larry Polec	F	SR	6–8	8.7	4.4	1.0
13	Darryl Johnson	G	SO	6–2	5.3	1.7	1.3
24	Richard Mudd	F	SR	6–9	3.9	5.5	0.3
15	Ralph Walker	F	JR	6–8	2.3	1.4	0.4
45	Carlton Valentine	F	FR	6–6	1.6	1.2	0.0
40	Barry Fordham	F	SO	6–8	1.1	0.6	0.1
21	Greg Pedro	G	SO	6–4	1.0	0.6	0.5
20	Greg Vanek	F	JR	6–6	0.3	0.2	0.0

== Schedule and results ==
Date time, TV	Rank^{#}	Opponent^{#}	Result	Record	Site city, state
Non-conference regular season
Nov 24, 1984*		at Canisius	W 80–71	1–0	Koessler Athletic Center; Buffalo, NY
Nov 30, 1984*		Western Michigan; Spartan Cutlass Classic Semifinal	W 77–61	2–0	Jenison Field House; East Lansing, MI
Dec 1, 1984*		Army; Spartan Cutlass Classic Championship	W 76–64	3–0	Jenison Field House; East Lansing, MI
Dec 10, 1984*		Saint Peter's	W 50–38	4–0	Jenison Field House; East Lansing, MI
Dec 12, 1984*		at Western Illinois	W 93–61	5–0	Western Hall; Macomb, IL
Dec 15, 1984*		Missouri	W 79–61	6–0	Jenison Field House; East Lansing, MI
Dec 18, 1984*		at George Washington	W 68–54	7–0	Charles E. Smith Center; Washington, D.C.
Dec 22, 1984*		at Illinois-Chicago	W 81–60	8–0	UIC Pavilion; Chicago, IL
Dec 28, 1984*		vs. Boston College; Cabrillo Classic Semifinal	L 78–82	8–1	Peterson Gym; San Diego, CA
Dec 29, 1984*		at San Diego State; Cabrillo Classic Third Place Game	W 77–61	9–1	Peterson Gym; San Diego, CA
Big 10 regular season
Jan 3, 1985		Ohio State	W 82–79	10–1 (1–0)	Jenison Field House; East Lansing, MI
Jan 5, 1985		No. 12 Indiana	W 68–61	11–1 (2–0)	Jenison Field House; East Lansing, MI
Jan 10, 1985	No. 17	at Purdue	W 81–72	12–1 (3–0)	Mackey Arena; West Lafayette, IN
Jan 12, 1985	No. 17	No. 15 Illinois	L 63–75	12–2 (3–1)	Assembly Hall; Champaign, IL
Jan 17, 1985	No. 19	Iowa	L 65–79	12–3 (3–2)	Jenison Field House; East Lansing, MI
Jan 19, 1985	No. 19	Minnesota	L 75–81	12–4 (3–3)	Jenison Field House; East Lansing, MI
Jan 24, 1985		at No. 18 Michigan; Rivalry	L 75–86	12–5 (3–4)	Crisler Arena; Ann Arbor, MI
Jan 31, 1985		at Wisconsin	W 77–68	13–5 (4–4)	Wisconsin Field House; Madison, WI
Feb 2, 1985		at Northwestern	W 68–54	14–5 (5–4)	Welsh-Ryan Arena; Evanston, IL
Feb 7, 1985		No. 9 Illinois	W 64–56	15–5 (6–4)	Jenison Field House; East Lansing, MI
Feb 9, 1985		Purdue	L 65–66	15–6 (6–5)	Jenison Field House; East Lansing, MI
Feb 13, 1985		at Minnesota	L 65–73	15–7 (6–6)	Williams Arena; Minneapolis, MN
Feb 16, 1985		at No. 11 Iowa	W 57–55	16–7 (7–6)	Carver-Hawkeye Arena; Iowa City, IA
Feb 21, 1985		No. 3 Michigan; Rivalry	L 73–75	16–8 (7–7)	Jenison Field House; East Lansing, MI
Feb 27, 1985		Northwestern	W 61–47	17–8 (8–7)	Jenison Field House; East Lansing, MI
Mar 2, 1985		Wisconsin	W 82–63	18–8 (9–7)	Jenison Field House; East Lansing, MI
Mar 7, 1985		at Indiana	W 68–58	19–7 (10–7)	Assembly Hall; Bloomington, IN
Mar 9, 1985		at Ohio State	L 79–90	19–9 (10–8)	St. John Arena; Columbus, OH
NCAA Tournament
Mar 15, 1985	(10 MW)	(7 MW) Alabama-Birmingham; First Round	L 68–70	19–10	Hofheinz Pavilion; Houston, TX
*Non-conference game. ^{#}Rankings from AP Poll,. (#) Tournament seedings in parentheses. MW=Midwest Region Source. All times are in Eastern Time.

== Awards and honors ==
- Sam Vincent – All-Big Ten First Team
