= 1984–85 Ohio State Buckeyes men's basketball team =

American college basketball season

1984–85 Ohio State Buckeyes men's basketball
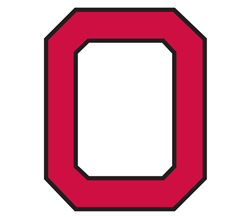

NCAA tournament, Second Round
- Conference: Big Ten Conference
- Record: 20–10 (11–7 Big Ten)
- Head coach: Eldon Miller (9th season)
- Assistant coach: Randy Ayers (1st season)
- Home arena: St. John Arena

1984–85 Big Ten Conference men's basketball standings
	Conf.				Overall
Team	W		L	PCT	W		L	PCT
No. 2 Michigan	16	–	2	.889	26	–	4	.867
No. 12 Illinois	12	–	6	.667	26	–	9	.743
Purdue	11	–	7	.611	20	–	9	.690
Ohio State	11	–	7	.611	20	–	10	.667
Iowa	10	–	8	.556	21	–	11	.656
Michigan State	10	–	8	.556	19	–	10	.655
Indiana	7	–	11	.389	19	–	14	.576
Minnesota	6	–	12	.333	13	–	15	.464
Wisconsin	5	–	13	.278	14	–	14	.500
Northwestern	2	–	16	.111	6	–	22	.214
Rankings from AP Poll

The 1984–85 Ohio State Buckeyes men's basketball team represented Ohio State University during the 1984–85 NCAA Division I men's basketball season. Led by ninth-year head coach Eldon Miller, the Buckeyes finished 20–10 (11–7 Big Ten) and reached the second round of the NCAA tournament.

== Roster ==
1984–85 Ohio State Buckeyes men's basketball team
Players
Coaches

Pos.	#	Name	Height	Weight	Year	Hometown
G/F	32	Dennis Hopson	6 ft 5 in (1.96 m)	200 lb (91 kg)	So	Toledo, Ohio
C		Brad Sellers	7 ft 0 in (2.13 m)	205 lb (93 kg)	Jr	Warrensville Heights, Ohio

Head coach

- Eldon Miller (Wittenberg)

Assistant coach(es)

- Randy Ayers

Legend

- (C) Team captain
- (S) Suspended
- (I) Ineligible
- (W) Walk-on
- Injured
- Current redshirt

== Schedule/results ==
Date time, TV	Rank^{#}	Opponent^{#}	Result	Record	Site (attendance) city, state
Non-conference regular season
Nov 24, 1984*		Lafayette	W 85–67	1–0	St. John Arena; Columbus, Ohio
Dec 1, 1984*		No. 17 Arkansas	W 85–84	2–0	St. John Arena; Columbus, Ohio
Dec 8, 1984*		vs. Connecticut	W 72–65	3–0	Hartford Civic Center; Hartford, Connecticut
Dec 11, 1984*		at Maryland	L 73–76	3–1	Cole Fieldhouse; College Park, Maryland
Dec 15, 1984*		Tulane	W 76–71	4–1	St. John Arena; Columbus, Ohio
Dec 19, 1984*		Central Florida	W 83–59	5–1	St. John Arena; Columbus, Ohio
Dec 22, 1984*		Missouri	W 88–77	6–1	St. John Arena; Columbus, Ohio
Dec 27, 1984*		vs. Chattanooga	W 84–62	7–1	
Dec 28, 1984*		vs. Stetson	W 73–67	8–1	
Big Ten Regular Season
Jan 3, 1985		at Michigan State	L 79–82	8–2 (0–1)	Jenison Field House; East Lansing, Michigan
Jan 5, 1985		at No. 16 Michigan	L 82–87	8–3 (0–2)	Crisler Arena; Ann Arbor, Michigan
Jan 9, 1985		Wisconsin	W 99–88	9–3 (1–2)	St. John Arena; Columbus, Ohio
Jan 12, 1985		Northwestern	W 79–59	10–3 (2–2)	St. John Arena; Columbus, Ohio
Jan 19, 1985		No. 8 Indiana	W 86–84	11–3 (3–2)	St. John Arena; Columbus, Ohio
Jan 23, 1985		at No. 6 Illinois	L 66–84	11–4 (3–3)	Assembly Hall; Champaign, Illinois
Jan 26, 1985		at Purdue	W 67–63	12–4 (4–3)	Mackey Arena; West Lafayette, Indiana
Jan 31, 1985		Minnesota	W 76–62	13–4 (5–3)	St. John Arena; Columbus, Ohio
Feb 2, 1985		Iowa	L 58–67	13–5 (5–4)	St. John Arena; Columbus, Ohio
Feb 7, 1985		Northwestern	W 63–60	14–5 (6–4)	Welsh-Ryan Arena; Evanston, Illinois
Feb 9, 1985		at Wisconsin	L 78–92	14–6 (6–5)	Wisconsin Field House; Madison, Wisconsin
Feb 14, 1985		at Indiana	W 72–63	15–6 (7–5)	Assembly Hall; Bloomington, Indiana
Feb 16, 1985*		vs. Northeastern	L 74–76	15–7	
Feb 21, 1985		Purdue	W 86–68	16–7 (8–5)	St. John Arena; Columbus, Ohio
Feb 23, 1985		No. 16 Illinois	W 72–64	17–7 (9–5)	St. John Arena; Columbus, Ohio
Feb 28, 1985		at Iowa	L 82–87	17–8 (9–6)	Carver-Hawkeye Arena; Iowa City, Iowa
Mar 2, 1985		at Minnesota	W 78–77	18–8 (10–6)	Williams Arena; Minneapolis, Minnesota
Mar 6, 1985		No. 3 Michigan	L 72–77	18–9 (10–7)	St. John Arena; Columbus, Ohio
Mar 9, 1985		Michigan State	W 90–79	19–9 (11–7)	St. John Arena; Columbus, Ohio
NCAA Tournament
Mar 14, 1985*	(4 MW)	vs. (13 MW) Iowa State; First round	W 75–64	20–9	Mabee Center (10,575); Tulsa, Oklahoma
Mar 16, 1985*	(4 MW)	vs. (5 MW) No. 8 Louisiana Tech; Second round	L 67–79	20–10	Mabee Center (10,575); Tulsa, Oklahoma
*Non-conference game. ^{#}Rankings from AP Poll. (#) Tournament seedings in parentheses.
