= 1985 Metro Conference men's basketball tournament =

- Classification: Division I
- Season: 1984–85
- Teams: 8
- Site: Freedom Hall; Louisville, KY
- Champions: Memphis State (3rd title)
- Winning coach: Dana Kirk (3rd title)
- MVP: Dean Shaffer (Florida State)

1984–85 Metro Conference men's basketball standings
	Conf.				Overall
Team	W		L	PCT	W		L	PCT
No. 5 Memphis State †	13	–	1	.929	31	–	4	.886
Virginia Tech	10	–	4	.714	20	–	9	.690
Cincinnati	8	–	6	.571	17	–	14	.548
South Carolina	6	–	8	.429	15	–	13	.536
Tulane	6	–	8	.429	15	–	13	.536
Louisville	6	–	8	.429	19	–	18	.514
Florida State	4	–	10	.286	14	–	16	.467
Southern Miss	3	–	11	.214	7	–	21	.250
† 1985 Metro Conference tournament winner Rankings from AP Poll

The 1985 Metro Conference men's basketball tournament was held March 7–9 at Freedom Hall in Louisville, Kentucky.

Memphis State defeated Florida State in the championship game, 90–86 in OT, to win their third Metro men's basketball tournament.

The Tigers received the conference's automatic bid to the 1985 NCAA Tournament, and would go on to reach the 1985 Final Four. Additionally, Virginia Tech received an at-large bid.

== Format ==
All eight members of the conference participated. Teams were seeded based on regular season conference records.

== Bracket ==
Quarterfinal; Thursday, March 7
1	5 Memphis State	68
8	Southern Miss	58
4	Louisville	74
5	South Carolina	61
3	Cincinnati	58
6	Tulane	44
7	Florida State	97
2	Virginia Tech	93

Semifinals; Friday, March 8
1	5 Memphis State	81
4	Louisville	74
3	Cincinnati	65
7	Florida State	75

Championship; Saturday, March 9
1	5 Memphis State	90*
7	Florida State	86
