= 1984–85 Illinois Fighting Illini men's basketball team =

American college basketball season

1984–85 Illinois Fighting Illini men's basketball

Illini Classic, Champion

NCAA men's Division I tournament, Sweet Sixteen
- Conference: Big Ten Conference

Ranking
- Coaches: No. 10
- AP: No. 12
- Record: 26–9 (12–6 Big Ten)
- Head coach: Lou Henson (10th season)
- Assistant coaches: Dick Nagy (6th season); Jimmy Collins (2nd season); Bob Hull (5th season)
- MVP: Doug Altenberger
- Captain: George Montgomery
- Home arena: Assembly Hall

1984–85 Big Ten Conference men's basketball standings
	Conf.				Overall
Team	W		L	PCT	W		L	PCT
No. 2 Michigan	16	–	2	.889	26	–	4	.867
No. 12 Illinois	12	–	6	.667	26	–	9	.743
Purdue	11	–	7	.611	20	–	9	.690
Ohio State	11	–	7	.611	20	–	10	.667
Iowa	10	–	8	.556	21	–	11	.656
Michigan State	10	–	8	.556	19	–	10	.655
Indiana	7	–	11	.389	19	–	14	.576
Minnesota	6	–	12	.333	13	–	15	.464
Wisconsin	5	–	13	.278	14	–	14	.500
Northwestern	2	–	16	.111	6	–	22	.214
Rankings from AP Poll

The 1984–85 Illinois Fighting Illini men's basketball team represented the University of Illiniois.

== Regular season ==
The Illini started out the 1984–85 season ranked No. 1 nationally by Basketball Times in its preseason poll. Illinois made a return trip to the NCAA tournament where the Illini advanced to the Sweet 16.

=== Roster ===
1984–85 Illinois Fighting Illini men's basketball team
Players
Coaches

Pos.	#	Name	Height	Weight	Year	Previous school	Hometown
F	4	Scott Haftner	6 ft 4 in (1.93 m)	165 lb (75 kg)	Fr	Noblesville High School	Noblesville, Indiana
G	10	Tony Wysinger	5 ft 10 in (1.78 m)	155 lb (70 kg)	So	Peoria Central High School	Peoria, Illinois
F	11	Tom Schafer	6 ft 7 in (2.01 m)	205 lb (93 kg)	So	Jacobs High School	Algonquin, Illinois
G	21	Glynn Blackwell	6 ft 4 in (1.93 m)	175 lb (79 kg)	Fr	Highland Park Community High School	Highland Park, Michigan
G	22	Doug Altenberger	6 ft 4 in (1.93 m)	200 lb (91 kg)	Jr	Richwoods High School	Peoria, Illinois
F	23	George Montgomery (C)	6 ft 9 in (2.06 m)	235 lb (107 kg)	Sr	Corliss High School	Chicago, Illinois
F	24	Efrem Winters	6 ft 9 in (2.06 m)	230 lb (104 kg)	Jr	King High School	Chicago, Illinois
G	25	Bruce Douglas	6 ft 3 in (1.91 m)	175 lb (79 kg)	Jr	Quincy Senior High School	Quincy, Illinois
F/C	30	Scott Meents	6 ft 9 in (2.06 m)	230 lb (104 kg)	Jr	Herscher High School	Kankakee, Illinois
F	33	Ken Norman	6 ft 8 in (2.03 m)	215 lb (98 kg)	So	Crane High School	Chicago, Illinois
F	34	Dee Maras	6 ft 7 in (2.01 m)	225 lb (102 kg)	Sr	Antioch Community High School	Antioch, Illinois
G	35	Reggie Woodward	6 ft 2 in (1.88 m)	170 lb (77 kg)	Jr	King High School	Chicago, Illinois
C	40	Olaf Blab (redshirt)	7 ft 0 in (2.13 m)	235 lb (107 kg)	Fr	Charleston High School	Munich, West Germany
F	44	Anthony Welch	6 ft 9 in (2.06 m)	200 lb (91 kg)	RS Jr	Creston High School	Grand Rapids, Michigan
C	40	Jens Kujawa (redshirt)	7 ft 0 in (2.13 m)	235 lb (107 kg)	Fr	Taylorville High School	Braunschweig, West Germany

Head coach

- Lou Henson (New Mexico State University) (10th year)

Assistant coach(es)

- Jimmy Collins (New Mexico State) (2nd year)
- Dick Nagy (Hardin-Simmons University) (6th year)
- Bob Hull (5th year)

Legend

- (C) Team captain
- (S) Suspended
- (I) Ineligible
- (W) Walk-on
- Injured
- Current redshirt

Roster

== Schedule ==
Date time, TV	Rank^{#}	Opponent^{#}	Result	Record	Site (attendance) city, state
Non-Conference regular season
11/18/1984*	No. 2	vs. No. 5 Oklahoma; Basketball Hall of Fame Tip-Off Classic	W 81–64	1–0	Hall of Fame (7,530); Springfield, MA
11/23/1984*	No. 2	vs. Idaho State; Great Alaska Shootout	W 66–44	2–0	Sullivan Arena (2,863); Anchorage, AK
11/24/1984*	No. 2	vs. Alabama-Birmingham; Great Alaska Shootout	L 52–59	2–1	Sullivan Arena (4,500); Anchorage, AK
11/25/1984*	No. 2	vs. Oregon; Great Alaska Shootout	W 75–72 ^{3ot}	3–1	Sullivan Arena (4,500); Anchorage, AK
11/28/1984*	No. 7	Chicago State	W 81–63	4–1	Assembly Hall (14,543); Champaign, IL
12/1/1984*	No. 7	No. 10 Oklahoma	W 73–70	5–1	Assembly Hall (16,671); Champaign, IL
12/4/1984*	No. 7	Cal State-Chico	W 92–47	6–1	Assembly Hall (14,046); Champaign, IL
12/6/1984*	No. 7	vs. Missouri; Braggin' Rights	W 65–50	7–1	St. Louis Arena (12,946); St. Louis, MO
12/7/1984*	No. 7	Columbia; Illini Classic	W 72–48	8–1	Assembly Hall (14,989); Champaign, IL
12/8/1984*	No. 7	New Mexico State; Illini Classic	W 93–55	9–1	Assembly Hall (15,789); Champaign, IL
12/16/1984*	No. 6	South Carolina State	W 83–47	10–1	Assembly Hall (14,026); Champaign, IL
12/18/1984*	No. 4	vs. Cincinnati	W 87–65	11–1	Rosemont Horizon (5,910); Rosemont, IL
12/22/1984*	No. 4	vs. Loyola (Chicago)	L 62–63	11–2	Rosemont Horizon (15,882); Rosemont, IL
Big Ten regular season
1/3/1985	No. 6	at Minnesota	L 58–60	11–3 (0–1)	Williams Arena (14,532); Minneapolis, MN
1/5/1985	No. 6	at Iowa; Rivalry	L 60–64	11–4 (0–2)	Carver–Hawkeye Arena (15,450); Iowa City, IA
1/10/1985	No. 15	Michigan	W 64–58 ^{ot}	12–4 (1–2)	Assembly Hall (13,801); Champaign, IL
1/12/1985	No. 15	No. 17 Michigan State	W 75–63	13–4 (2–2)	Assembly Hall (16,545); Champaign, IL
1/17/1985	No. 11	at Wisconsin	W 78–67	14–4 (3–2)	Wisconsin Field House (9,448); Madison, WI
1/19/1985	No. 11	at Northwestern; Rivalry	W 55–43	15–4 (4–2)	Welsh-Ryan Arena (8,117); Evanston, IL
1/23/1985	No. 6	Ohio State	W 84–66	16–4 (5–2)	Assembly Hall (15,906); Champaign, IL
1/27/1985	No. 6	No. 13 Indiana; Rivalry	W 52–41	17–4 (6–2)	Assembly Hall (16,764); Champaign, IL
1/30/1985	No. 5	at Purdue	L 34–54	17–5 (6–3)	Mackey Arena (14,123); West Lafayette, IN
2/3/1985*	No. 5	at Houston	W 77–76	18–5	Hofheinz Pavilion (7,000); Houston, TX
2/7/1985	No. 9	at Michigan State	L 56–64	18–6 (6–4)	Jenison Fieldhouse (9,691); East Lansing, MI
2/9/1985	No. 9	at No. 8 Michigan	L 45–57	18–7 (6–5)	Crisler Arena (13,609); Ann Arbor, MI
2/14/1985	No. 17	Northwestern; Rivalry	W 64–42	19–7 (7–5)	Assembly Hall (15,841); Champaign, IL
2/16/1985	No. 17	Wisconsin	W 68–49	20–7 (8–5)	Assembly Hall (16,618); Champaign, IL
2/21/1985	No. 16	at Indiana; Rivalry	W 66–50	21–7 (9–5)	Assembly Hall (16,823); Bloomington, IN
2/23/1985	No. 16	at Ohio State	L 64–72	21–8 (9–6)	St. John Arena (13,681); Columbus, OH
3/2/1985	No. 18	Purdue	W 86–43	22–8 (10–6)	Assembly Hall (16,648); Champaign, IL
3/7/1985	No. 14	Iowa; Rivalry	W 59–53 ^{ot}	23–8 (11–6)	Assembly Hall (16,742); Champaign, IL
3/9/1985	No. 14	Minnesota	W 82–56	24–8 (12–6)	Assembly Hall (16,617); Champaign, IL
NCAA Tournament
3/15/1985*	(3 E) No. 12	vs. (14 E) Northeastern; First round	W 76–57	25–8	Omni Coliseum (14,311); Atlanta, GA
3/17/1985*	(3 E) No. 12	vs. (6 E) No. 19 Georgia; Second Round	W 74–58	26–8	Omni Coliseum (16,723); Atlanta, GA
3/21/1985*	(3 E) No. 12	vs. (2 E) No. 6 Georgia Tech; Regional semifinals	L 53–61	26–9	Providence Civic Center (11,913); Providence, RI
*Non-conference game. ^{#}Rankings from AP Poll. (#) Tournament seedings in parentheses. All times are in Central Time.

== Player stats ==
Player	Games Played	Minutes Played	Field Goals	Free Throws	Rebounds	Assists	Blocks	Steals	Points
Anthony Welch	35	1092	182	51	189	51	9	26	415
Doug Altenberger	35	1113	162	70	126	67	14	38	394
Efrem Winters	35	1071	137	76	252	49	32	33	350
Bruce Douglas	35	1174	118	42	107	200	6	85	278
George Montgomery	23	587	86	64	168	39	6	21	236
Ken Norman	29	354	86	55	107	26	16	9	227
Scott Meents	35	652	84	25	111	87	24	16	193
Tony Wysinger	35	410	48	38	32	64	1	16	134
Tom Schafer	15	227	31	18	46	17	2	5	80
Scott Haffner	29	201	20	9	16	17	2	2	49
Reggie Woodward	12	34	12	5	3	3	0	4	29
Glynn Blackwell	10	65	8	9	11	10	1	7	25

== Awards and honors ==
- Bruce Douglas
  - Big Ten Defensive Player of the Year
  - Fighting Illini All-Century team (2005)
- Ken Norman
  - Fighting Illini All-Century team (2005)
- Doug Altenberger
  - Team Most Valuable Player

== Team players drafted into the NBA ==
Player	NBA club	Round	Pick
George Montgomery	Portland Trail Blazers	2	39
