= 1985 Sun Belt Conference men's basketball tournament =

- Classification: Division I
- Season: 1984–85
- Teams: 8
- Site: Hampton Coliseum; Hampton, VA
- Champions: VCU (3rd title)
- Winning coach: J.D. Barnett (3rd title)
- MVP: Mike Schlegel (VCU)

1984–85 Sun Belt Conference men's basketball standings
	Conf.				Overall
Team	W		L	PCT	W		L	PCT
No. 11 VCU †	12	–	2	.857	26	–	6	.813
UAB	11	–	3	.786	25	–	9	.735
Old Dominion	9	–	5	.643	19	–	12	.613
South Florida	6	–	8	.429	18	–	12	.600
Jacksonville	6	–	8	.429	15	–	14	.517
South Alabama	6	–	8	.429	15	–	13	.536
Western Kentucky	5	–	9	.357	14	–	14	.500
UNC Charlotte	1	–	13	.071	5	–	23	.179
† 1985 Sun Belt Conference tournament winner Rankings from AP Poll

The 1985 Sun Belt Conference men's basketball tournament was held March 1–3 at the Hampton Coliseum in Hampton, Virginia.

Top-seeded VCU defeated rival Old Dominion in the championship game, 87–82, to win their third Sun Belt men's basketball tournament.

The Rams, in turn, received an automatic bid to the 1985 NCAA tournament. They were joined in the tournament by fellow Sun Belt members UAB and Old Dominion, both of whom received at-large bids.

== Format ==
No changes were made to the tournament format. All eight conference members were placed into the initial quarterfinal round, and each team was seeded based on its regular season conference record.

== Bracket ==
Quarterfinals; Friday, March 1
1	17 VCU	85
8	UNC Charlotte	62
5	Jacksonville	75
4	South Florida	69
3	Old Dominion	84
6	South Alabama	66
7	Western Kentucky	56
2	UAB	64

Semifinals; Saturday, March 2
1	17 VCU	75
5	Jacksonville	57
3	Old Dominion	68
2	UAB	67

Championship; Sunday, March 3
1	17 VCU	87
3	Old Dominion	82

== See also ==
- 1985 Sun Belt Conference women's basketball tournament
