= 1984–85 UAB Blazers men's basketball team =

American college basketball season

1984–85 UAB Blazers men's basketball

Great Alaska Shootout champions

NCAA tournament, Second Round
- Conference: Sun Belt Conference
- Record: 25–9 (11–3 Sun Belt)
- Head coach: Gene Bartow (7th season)
- Home arena: BJCC Coliseum

1984–85 Sun Belt Conference men's basketball standings
	Conf.				Overall
Team	W		L	PCT	W		L	PCT
No. 11 VCU †	12	–	2	.857	26	–	6	.813
UAB	11	–	3	.786	25	–	9	.735
Old Dominion	9	–	5	.643	19	–	12	.613
South Florida	6	–	8	.429	18	–	12	.600
Jacksonville	6	–	8	.429	15	–	14	.517
South Alabama	6	–	8	.429	15	–	13	.536
Western Kentucky	5	–	9	.357	14	–	14	.500
UNC Charlotte	1	–	13	.071	5	–	23	.179
† 1985 Sun Belt Conference tournament winner Rankings from AP Poll

The 1984–85 UAB Blazers men's basketball team represented the University of Alabama at Birmingham as a member of the Sun Belt Conference during the 1984–85 NCAA Division I men's basketball season. This was head coach Gene Bartow's 7th season at UAB, and the Blazers played their home games at BJCC Coliseum. They finished the season 25–9, 11–3 in Sun Belt play and lost in the semifinals of the Sun Belt tournament. They received an at-large bid to the NCAA tournament as No. 7 seed in the Midwest region. The Blazers defeated Michigan State in the opening round before falling to No. 2 seed and eventual Final Four participant Memphis State in the round of 32, 67–66.

== Roster ==
1984–85 UAB Blazers men's basketball team
Players
Coaches

Pos.	#	Name	Height	Weight	Year	Hometown
G	11	Murry Bartow	5 ft 10 in (1.78 m)	160 lb (73 kg)	Sr	Birmingham, Alabama
F	12	Marvin Ray Johnson	6 ft 7 in (2.01 m)	—	Sr	Birmingham, Alabama
G	14	Steve Mitchell	6 ft 5 in (1.96 m)	195 lb (88 kg)	Jr	Memphis, Tennessee
G	32	James Ponder	6 ft 1 in (1.85 m)	170 lb (77 kg)	So	Atlanta, Georgia
F	40	Jerome Mincy	6 ft 6 in (1.98 m)	215 lb (98 kg)	Jr	Memphis, Tennessee

Head coach

- Gene Bartow

Assistant coach(es)

Legend

- (C) Team captain
- (S) Suspended
- (I) Ineligible
- (W) Walk-on
- Injured
- Current redshirt

Roster

== Schedule and results ==
Date time, TV	Rank^{#}	Opponent^{#}	Result	Record	Site (attendance) city, state
Regular season
Nov 23, 1984*		vs. Tennessee; Great Alaska Shootout	W 70–65	1–0	Sullivan Arena (2,863); Anchorage, Alaska
Nov 24, 1984*		vs. No. 2 Illinois; Great Alaska Shootout	W 59–52	2–0	Sullivan Arena (4,762); Anchorage, Alaska
Nov 25, 1984*		vs. No. 19 Kansas; Great Alaska Shootout	W 50–46	3–0	Sullivan Arena (4,286); Anchorage, Alaska
Nov 30, 1984*	No. 13	Auburn	L 59–61	3–1	Birmingham-Jefferson Civic Center (17,025); Birmingham, Alabama
Dec 1, 1984*	No. 13	Rhodes College	W 95–72	4–1	Birmingham-Jefferson Civic Center (3,211); Birmingham, Alabama
Dec 5, 1984*	No. 18	South Carolina State	W 73–56	5–1	Birmingham-Jefferson Civic Center (3,556); Birmingham, Alabama
Dec 12, 1984*	No. 17	at Cincinnati	L 67–69	5–2	Riverfront Coliseum (5,080); Cincinnati, Ohio
Dec 15, 1984*	No. 17	East Tennessee State	W 72–57	6–2	Birmingham-Jefferson Civic Center (4,889); Birmingham, Alabama
Dec 17, 1984*		Mississippi State	W 65–63	7–2	Birmingham-Jefferson Civic Center (5,595); Birmingham, Alabama
Dec 21, 1984*		Austin Peay; UAB Classic	W 80–68	8–2	Birmingham-Jefferson Civic Center (3,391); Birmingham, Alabama
Dec 22, 1984*		George Mason; UAB Classic	L 60–61	8–3	Birmingham-Jefferson Civic Center (4,710); Birmingham, Alabama
Dec 28, 1984*		vs. No. 2 Duke; Trojan-Bud Light Classic	L 62–76	8–4	L.A. Sports Arena (5,047); Los Angeles, California
Dec 29, 1984*		vs. The Citadel; Trojan-Bud Light Classic	W 79–64	9–4	L.A. Sports Arena (5,776); Los Angeles, California
Jan 3, 1985*		Wisconsin-Parkside	W 89–65	10–4	Birmingham-Jefferson Civic Center (2,896); Birmingham, Alabama
Jan 4, 1985*		No. 10 DePaul	W 66–59	11–4	Birmingham-Jefferson Civic Center (17,222); Birmingham, Alabama
Jan 10, 1985		Jacksonville	W 67–55	12–4 (1–0)	Birmingham-Jefferson Civic Center (5,785); Birmingham, Alabama
Jan 12, 1985		at South Florida	W 58–52	13–4 (2–0)	Sun Dome (6,367); Tampa, Florida
Jan 16, 1985		at Jacksonville	W 69–64	14–4 (3–0)	Jacksonville Memorial Coliseum (4,593); Jacksonville, Florida
Jan 19, 1985		at Western Kentucky	W 68–66	15–4 (4–0)	E.A. Diddle Arena (9,800); Bowling Green, Kentucky
Jan 22, 1985		UNC Charlotte	W 65–62	16–4 (5–0)	Birmingham-Jefferson Civic Center (4,912); Birmingham, Alabama
Jan 24, 1985		at Old Dominion	W 56–55	17–4 (6–0)	Norfolk Scope (5,021); Norfolk, Virginia
Jan 26, 1985		No. 19 VCU	W 66–62	18–4 (7–0)	Birmingham-Jefferson Civic Center (16,866); Birmingham, Alabama
Jan 31, 1985	No. 20	Old Dominion	L 58–59	18–5 (7–1)	Birmingham-Jefferson Civic Center (12,032); Birmingham, Alabama
Feb 2, 1985		South Alabama	W 81–73 ^{OT}	19–5 (8–1)	Birmingham-Jefferson Civic Center (6,883); Birmingham, Alabama
Feb 7, 1985*		Jackson State	W 80–57	20–5	Birmingham-Jefferson Civic Center (4,478); Birmingham, Alabama
Feb 9, 1985		Western Kentucky	W 77–62	21–5 (9–1)	Birmingham-Jefferson Civic Center (13,864); Birmingham, Alabama
Feb 13, 1985	No. 19	VCU	L 53–67	21–6 (9–2)	Richmond Coliseum (10,058); Richmond, Virginia
Feb 19, 1985		South Florida	W 62–61	22–6 (10–2)	Birmingham-Jefferson Civic Center (16,781); Birmingham, Alabama
Feb 21, 1985		at UNC Charlotte	W 60–55	23–6 (11–2)	Charlotte Coliseum (2,140); Charlotte, North Carolina
Feb 23, 1985		at South Alabama	L 68–80	23–7 (11–3)	Jaguar Gym (6,581); Mobile, Alabama
Sun Belt tournament
Mar 1, 1985*	(2)	vs. (7) Western Kentucky; Quarterfinals	W 64–56	24–7	Hampton Coliseum (3,010); Hampton, Virginia
Mar 2, 1985*	(2)	vs. (3) Old Dominion; Semifinals	L 67–68	24–8	Hampton Coliseum (9,558); Hampton, Virginia
NCAA tournament
Mar 15, 1985*	(7 MW)	vs. (10 MW) Michigan State; First round	W 70–68	25–8	Hofheinz Pavilion (8,000); Houston, Texas
Mar 17, 1985*	(7 MW)	vs. (2 MW) No. 5 Memphis State; Second round	L 66–67 ^{OT}	25–9	Hofheinz Pavilion (6,800); Houston, Texas
*Non-conference game. ^{#}Rankings from AP poll. (#) Tournament seedings in parentheses. MW=Midwest.

== Awards and honors ==
- Gene Bartow – Sun Belt Coach of the Year
