= 1984–85 Memphis State Tigers men's basketball team =

American college basketball season

1984–85 Memphis State Tigers men's basketball

Metro Conference tournament champions Metro Conference regular season champions

NCAA tournament, Final Four (vacated)
- Conference: Metro Conference (1975–1995)

Ranking
- Coaches: No. 5
- AP: No. 5
- Record: 27–3 (31–4 unadjusted) (13–1 Metro)
- Head coach: Dana Kirk (6th season)
- Assistant coaches: Larry Finch (5th season); Lee Fowler
- Home arena: Mid-South Coliseum

1984–85 Metro Conference men's basketball standings
| | Conf. | | | | Overall |
| Team | W | | L | PCT | W | | L | PCT |
|---|---|---|---|---|---|---|---|---|
| No. 5 Memphis State † | 13 | – | 1 | .929 | 31 | – | 4 | .886 |
| Virginia Tech | 10 | – | 4 | .714 | 20 | – | 9 | .690 |
| Cincinnati | 8 | – | 6 | .571 | 17 | – | 14 | .548 |
| South Carolina | 6 | – | 8 | .429 | 15 | – | 13 | .536 |
| Tulane | 6 | – | 8 | .429 | 15 | – | 13 | .536 |
| Louisville | 6 | – | 8 | .429 | 19 | – | 18 | .514 |
| Florida State | 4 | – | 10 | .286 | 14 | – | 16 | .467 |
| Southern Miss | 3 | – | 11 | .214 | 7 | – | 21 | .250 |
† 1985 Metro Conference tournament winner Rankings from AP Poll

The 1984–85 Memphis State Tigers men's basketball team represented Memphis State University as a member of the Metro Conference during the 1984–85 NCAA Division I men's basketball season.

After losing in the Sweet 16 each of the previous three seasons, the Tigers broke through to reach the Final Four of the 1985 NCAA tournament and finished with a 31–4 record (13–1 Metro). In the semifinal game Memphis would lose to the eventual National Champions Villanova Wildcats 52–45.

== Roster ==
1984–85 Memphis State Tigers men's basketball team
Players
Coaches

| Pos. | # | Name | Height | Weight | Year | Hometown |
|---|---|---|---|---|---|---|
| G | 10 | Andre Turner | 5 ft 10 in (1.78 m) | 165 lb (75 kg) | Jr | Memphis, Tennessee |
| G | 11 | Ricky McCoy | 6 ft 2 in (1.88 m) | 180 lb (82 kg) | Sr | Memphis, Tennessee |
| G | 20 | John Wilfong | 6 ft 2 in (1.88 m) | 170 lb (77 kg) | So | Memphis, Tennessee |
| F | 24 | Keith Lee | 6 ft 10 in (2.08 m) | 220 lb (100 kg) | Sr | West Memphis, Arkansas |
| G | 30 | Vincent Askew | 6 ft 5 in (1.96 m) | 200 lb (91 kg) | Fr | Memphis, Tennessee |
| G | 31 | Dwight Boyd | 6 ft 3 in (1.91 m) | 190 lb (86 kg) | Fr | Memphis, Tennessee |
| C | 42 | DeWayne Bailey | 6 ft 9 in (2.06 m) | 220 lb (100 kg) | Fr | Memphis, Tennessee |
| F | 43 | Baskerville Holmes | 6 ft 7 in (2.01 m) | 190 lb (86 kg) | Jr | Memphis, Tennessee |
| F | 44 | David Jensen | 6 ft 6 in (1.98 m) | 215 lb (98 kg) | Fr | Greenville, South Carolina |
| F | 45 | Willie Becton | 6 ft 5 in (1.96 m) | 215 lb (98 kg) | Sr | Memphis, Tennessee |
| C | 50 | William Bedford | 7 ft 0 in (2.13 m) | 220 lb (100 kg) | So | Memphis, Tennessee |

Head coach

- Dana Kirk (Marshall)

Assistant coach(es)

- Larry Finch (Memphis)
- Lee Fowler (Vanderbilt)

Legend

- (C) Team captain
- (S) Suspended
- (I) Ineligible
- (W) Walk-on
- Injured
- Current redshirt

Roster
Last update: 2019-Mar-17

== Schedule and results ==
| Date time, TV | Rank^{#} | Opponent^{#} | Result | Record | Site city, state |
Regular season
| Nov 30, 1984* | No. 5 | Arkansas State | W 79–62 | 1–0 | Mid-South Coliseum; Memphis, TN |
| Dec 1, 1984* | No. 5 | USC | W 61–45 | 2–0 | Mid-South Coliseum; Memphis, TN |
| Dec 5, 1984* | No. 5 | Middle Tennessee State | W 90–77 | 3–0 | Mid-South Coliseum; Memphis, TN |
| Dec 8, 1984* | No. 5 | UCLA | W 86–70 | 4–0 | Mid-South Coliseum; Memphis, TN |
| Dec 11, 1984* | No. 5 | at Ole Miss | W 57–52 | 5–0 | Tad Smith Coliseum; Oxford, MS |
| Dec 15, 1984* | No. 5 | at Mississippi State | W 68–59 | 6–0 | Humphrey Coliseum; Starkville, MS |
| Dec 17, 1984* | No. 3 | at Kent State | W 74–57 | 7–0 | Memorial Athletic and Convocation Center; Kent, OH |
| Dec 22, 1984* | No. 3 | Iona | W 76–62 | 8–0 | Mid-South Coliseum; Memphis, Tennessee |
| Jan 5, 1985* | No. 3 | at South Carolina | L 58–60 | 8–1 (0–1) | Carolina Coliseum; Columbia, SC |
| Jan 9, 1985* | No. 6 | Tennessee State | W 90–57 | 9–1 | Mid-South Coliseum; Memphis, TN |
| Jan 12, 1985 | No. 6 | Southern Miss | W 82–60 | 10–1 (1–1) | Mid-South Coliseum; Memphis, TN |
| Jan 14, 1985 | No. 5 | Tulane | W 56–52 | 11–1 (2–1) | Mid-South Coliseum; Memphis, Tennessee |
| Jan 19, 1985 | No. 5 | at Louisville | W 69–66 | 12–1 (3–1) | Freedom Hall; Louisville, Kentucky |
| Jan 21, 1985 | No. 4 | at Florida State | W 74–69 | 13–1 (4–1) | Donald L. Tucker Center; Tallahassee, Florida |
| Jan 26, 1985 | No. 4 | at Virginia Tech | W 89–79 | 14–1 (5–1) | Cassell Coliseum; Blacksburg, VA |
| Jan 28, 1985 | No. 3 | Cincinnati | W 81–61 | 15–1 (6–1) | Mid-South Coliseum; Memphis, TN |
| Feb 2, 1985 | No. 3 | Virginia Tech | W 91–82 | 16–1 (7–1) | Mid-South Coliseum; Memphis, TN |
| Feb 10, 1985* | No. 3 | at No. 13 Kansas | L 71–75 | 16–2 | Allen Fieldhouse; Lawrence, Kansas |
| Feb 13, 1985 | No. 3 | at Cincinnati | W 68–55 | 17–2 (8–1) | Riverfront Coliseum; Cincinnati, Ohio |
| Feb 16, 1985 | No. 5 | Florida State | W 70–68 | 18–2 (9–1) | Mid-South Coliseum; Memphis, TN |
| Feb 18, 1985 | No. 5 | South Carolina | W 99–75 | 19–2 (10–1) | Mid-South Coliseum; Memphis, TN |
| Feb 23, 1985 | No. 4 | at Tulane | W 60–49 | 20–2 (11–1) | Avron B. Fogelman Arena; New Orleans, LA |
| Feb 24, 1985* | No. 4 | No. 17 VCU | W 81–73 | 21–2 | Mid-South Coliseum; Memphis, TN |
| Feb 25, 1985 | No. 4 | at Southern Miss | W 78–63 | 22–2 (12–1) | Reed Green Coliseum; Hattiesburg, Mississippi |
| Feb 28, 1985* | No. 4 | at Detroit | L 66–71 | 22–3 | Calihan Hall; Detroit, Michigan |
| Mar 2, 1985* | No. 4 | Louisville | W 66–59 | 23–3 (13–1) | Mid-South Coliseum; Memphis, TN |
Metro Conference tournament
| Mar 7, 1985* | No. 5 | vs. Southern Miss; Metro tournament quarterfinals | W 68–58 | 24–3 | Freedom Hall; Louisville, KY |
| Mar 8, 1985* | No. 5 | at Louisville; Metro tournament semifinals | W 81–74 | 25–3 | Freedom Hall; Louisville, KY |
| Mar 9, 1985* | No. 5 | vs. Florida State; Metro tournament championship | W 90–86 ^{OT} | 27–3 | Freedom Hall; Louisville, KY |
NCAA Tournament
| Mar 15, 1985* | (2) No. 5 | vs. (15) Penn; First round | W 67–55 | 28–3 | Hofheinz Pavilion; Houston, TX |
| Mar 17, 1985* | (2) No. 5 | vs. (7) UAB; Second Round | W 67–66 ^{OT} | 29–3 | Hofheinz Pavilion; Houston, TX |
| Mar 23, 1985* | (2) No. 5 | vs. (11) Boston College; Midwest Regional semifinal | W 59–57 | 30–3 | Reunion Arena; Dallas, TX |
| Mar 23, 1985* | (2) No. 5 | vs. (1) No. 4 Oklahoma; Midwest Regional final | W 63–61 | 31–3 | Reunion Arena; Dallas, TX |
| Mar 30, 1985* | (2 MW) No. 5 | vs. (8 SE) Villanova; National semifinal | L 45–52 | 31–4 | Rupp Arena; Lexington, KY |
*Non-conference game. ^{#}Rankings from AP Poll. (#) Tournament seedings in parentheses. MW=Midwest region. All times are in Eastern Time.

== Awards and honors ==
- Keith Lee – Metro Conference Player of the Year, Consensus First-team All-American
