= 1984–85 VCU Rams men's basketball team =

American college basketball season

1984–85 VCU Rams men's basketball

Sun Belt Regular Season and tournament champions

NCAA tournament, Second Round
- Conference: Sun Belt Conference

Ranking
- Coaches: No. 11
- AP: No. 11
- Record: 26–6 (12–2 SBC)
- Head coach: J. D. Barnett (6th season)
- Home arena: Richmond Coliseum

1984–85 Sun Belt Conference men's basketball standings
	Conf.				Overall
Team	W		L	PCT	W		L	PCT
No. 11 VCU †	12	–	2	.857	26	–	6	.813
UAB	11	–	3	.786	25	–	9	.735
Old Dominion	9	–	5	.643	19	–	12	.613
South Florida	6	–	8	.429	18	–	12	.600
Jacksonville	6	–	8	.429	15	–	14	.517
South Alabama	6	–	8	.429	15	–	13	.536
Western Kentucky	5	–	9	.357	14	–	14	.500
UNC Charlotte	1	–	13	.071	5	–	23	.179
† 1985 Sun Belt Conference tournament winner Rankings from AP Poll

The 1984–85 VCU Rams men's basketball team represented Virginia Commonwealth University during the 1984–85 NCAA Division I men's basketball season. Their head coach is Mike Rhoades, his fourth year as VCU head coach. The team will play its home games at the Siegel Center in Richmond, Virginia, as a member of the Atlantic 10 Conference.

The Rams were the Atlantic 10 regular season and tournament champions. This would be the final season where the team was ranked until 2012–13 season.

== Schedule and results ==
Date time, TV	Rank^{#}	Opponent^{#}	Result	Record	Site (attendance) city, state
Non-conference regular season
November 29, 1984*		at East Carolina	W 72–61	1–0	Minges Coliseum; Greenville, NC
December 1, 1984*		at No. 6 Louisville	L 55–67	1–1	Freedom Hall; Louisville, KY
December 4, 1984*		at Richmond; Capital City Classic	W 69–60	2–1	Robins Center; Richmond, VA
December 8, 1984*		George Mason; George Mason rivalry	W 87–78	3–1	Richmond Coliseum; Richmond, VA
December 15, 1984*		Dayton	W 71–61	4–1	Richmond Coliseum; Richmond, VA
December 21, 1984*		vs. Auburn; Krystal Classic	W 78–59	5–1	McKenzie Arena; Chattanooga, TN
December 22, 1984*		at Chattanooga; Krystal Classic	W 74–58	6–1	McKenzie Arena; Chattanooga, TN
December 28, 1984*		Richmond; Times–Dispatch Invitational	W 68–52	7–1	Richmond Coliseum; Richmond, VA
December 29, 1984*		No. 16 Virginia Tech; Times–Dispatch Invitational	W 69–65	8–1	Richmond Coliseum; Richmond, VA
Sun Belt regular season
January 5, 1985	No. 20	at Jacksonville	W 67–65 ^{OT}	9–1 (1–0)	Jacksonville Coliseum; Jacksonville, FL
January 10, 1985	No. 18	at Western Kentucky	W 72–58	10–1 (2–0)	Diddle Arena; Bowling Green, KY
January 14, 1985*	No. 18	James Madison	W 95–52	11–1	Richmond Coliseum; Richmond, VA
January 17, 1985	No. 16	at Charlotte	W 85–75	12–1 (3–0)	Bojangles' Coliseum; Charlotte, NC
January 19, 1985	No. 16	South Florida	L 58–60	12–2 (3–1)	Richmond Coliseum; Richmond, VA
January 22, 1985*	No. 19	West Virginia	W 72–60	13–2	Richmond Coliseum; Richmond, VA
January 24, 1985	No. 19	at South Alabama	W 71–70	14–2 (4–1)	Jag Gym; Mobile, AL
January 26, 1985	No. 19	at UAB	L 62–66	14–3 (4–2)	Birmingham–Jefferson Civic Center; Birmingham, AL
January 31, 1985	No. 24	Jacksonville	W 81–54	15–3 (5–2)	Richmond Coliseum; Richmond, VA
February 2, 1985	No. 24	at South Florida	W 62–55	16–3 (6–2)	Sun Dome; Tampa, FL
February 5, 1985*	No. 24	at James Madison	L 65–66	16–4	Convocation Center; Harrisonburg, VA
February 7, 1985		Charlotte	W 77–56	17–4 (7–2)	Richmond Coliseum; Richmond, VA
February 9, 1985		South Alabama	W 53–45	18–4 (8–2)	Richmond Coliseum; Richmond, VA
February 13, 1985		No. 19 UAB	W 67–53	19–4 (9–2)	Richmond Coliseum; Richmond, VA
February 16, 1985		Old Dominion; ODU rivalry	W 90–71	20–4 (10–2)	Richmond Coliseum; Richmond, VA
February 21, 1985	No. 17	Western Kentucky	W 85–62	21–4 (11–2)	Richmond Coliseum; Richmond, VA
February 23, 1985*	No. 17	at No. 4 Memphis State	L 73–81	21–5	Mid-South Coliseum; Memphis, TN
February 25, 1985	No. 17	at Old Dominion; ODU Rivalry	W 78–66	22–5 (12–2)	ODU Fieldhouse; Norfolk, VA
Sun Belt tournament
March 1, 1985	(1) No. 17	vs. (8) Charlotte; Quarterfinals	W 85–62	23–5	Hampton Coliseum; Hampton, VA
March 2, 1985	(1) No. 17	vs. (5) Jacksonville; Semifinals	W 75–57	24–5	Hampton Coliseum; Hampton, VA
March 3, 1985	(1) No. 17	vs. (3) Old Dominion; Final	W 87–82	25–5	Hampton Coliseum; Hampton, VA
NCAA tournament
March 15, 1985	(W 2) No. 12	vs. (W 15) Marshall; First round	W 81–65	26–5	The Pit; Albuquerque, NM
March 17, 1985	(W 2) No. 12	vs. (W 7) Alabama; Second round	L 59–63	26–6	The Pit; Albuquerque, NM

== Rankings ==
Ranking movements Legend: ██ Increase in ranking ██ Decrease in ranking — = Not ranked RV = Received votes
	Week															
Poll	Pre	1	2	3	4	5	6	7	8	9	10	11	12	13	14	Final
AP	—	—	—	RV	RV	RV	20	18	16	19	24	RV	RV	17	12	11
