= 1984–85 NCAA Division I men's basketball rankings =

- Season: 1984–85
- NCAA Tournament: 1985
- Preseason No. 1: Georgetown
- NCAA Tournament Champions: Villanova
NCAA Division I men's basketball rankings
| |

The 1984–85 NCAA Division I men's basketball rankings was made up of two human polls, the AP Poll and the Coaches Poll, in addition to various other preseason polls.

== Legend ==
| | Increase in ranking |
| | Decrease in ranking |
| | New to rankings from previous week |
| Italics | Number of first place votes |
| (#–#) | Win–loss record |
| т | Tied with team above or below also with this symbol |

== AP Poll ==
| | Preseason | Week 1 Nov. 26 | Week 2 Dec. 3 | Week 3 Dec. 10 | Week 4 Dec. 17 | Week 5 Dec. 24 | Week 6 Dec. 31 | Week 7 Jan. 7 | Week 8 Jan. 14 | Week 9 Jan. 21 | Week 10 Jan. 28 | Week 11 Feb. 4 | Week 12 Feb. 11 | Week 13 Feb. 18 | Week 14 Feb. 25 | Week 15 Mar. 4 | Final Mar. 11 | |
|---|---|---|---|---|---|---|---|---|---|---|---|---|---|---|---|---|---|---|
| 1. | Georgetown | Georgetown (1–0) | Georgetown (3–0) | Georgetown (5–0) | Georgetown (7–0) | Georgetown (9–0) | Georgetown (11–0) | Georgetown (13–0) | Georgetown (15–0) | Georgetown (17–0) | St. John's (15–1) | St. John's (18–1) | St. John's (19–1) | St. John's (22–1) | St. John's (24–1) | Georgetown (27–2) | Georgetown (30–2) | 1. |
| 2. | Illinois | DePaul (1–0) | DePaul (2–0) | DePaul (5–0) | Duke (5–0) | Duke (7–0) | Duke (9–0) | Duke (10–0) | Duke (12–0) | SMU (15–1) | Georgetown (18–1) | Georgetown (19–2) | Georgetown (21–2) | Georgetown (23–2) | Georgetown (25–2) | St. John's (25–2) | Michigan (25–3) | 2. |
| 3. | DePaul | St. John's (0–0) | St. John's (2–0) | Duke (5–0) | Memphis State (5–0) | Memphis State (8–0) | Memphis State (8–0) | St. John's (10–1) | SMU (14–1) | St. John's (13–1) | Memphis State (15–1) | Memphis State (17–1) | Michigan (18–3) | Michigan (20–3) | Michigan (21–3) | Michigan (23–3) | St. John's (27–3) | 3. |
| 4. | Indiana | Duke (0–0) | Duke (3–0) | St. John's (4–0) | Illinois (10–1) | SMU (9–0) | St. John's (8–1) | SMU (11–1) | St. John's (11–1) | Memphis State (13–1) | SMU (16–2) | SMU (18–2) | Oklahoma (19–4) | Memphis State (20–2) | Memphis State (22–2) | Oklahoma (25–5) | Oklahoma (28–5) | 4. |
| 5. | Oklahoma | Memphis State (0–0) | Memphis State (2–0) | Memphis State (4–0) | DePaul (6–1) | St. John's (6–1) | Syracuse (8–0) | North Carolina (10–1) | Memphis State (11–1) | Duke (13–2) | Illinois (17–4) | Duke (16–3) | Memphis State (17–2) | Oklahoma (21–4) | Duke (20–5) | Memphis State (24–3) | Memphis State (27–3) | 5. |
| 6. | Duke | Louisville (1–0) | Louisville (2–0) | Illinois (9–1) | SMU (6–0) | Syracuse (6–0) | Illinois (11–2) | Memphis State (9–1) | North Carolina (12–2) | Illinois (15–4) | Duke (14–3) | Syracuse (15–3) | Georgia Tech (18–4) | Duke (18–4) | Oklahoma (22–5) | North Carolina (22–7) | Georgia Tech (24–7) | 6. |
| 7. | St. John's | Illinois (3–1) | Illinois (5–1) | SMU (4–0) | Washington (4–0) | North Carolina (7–0) | SMU (9–1) | Syracuse (8–1) | Syracuse (10–1) | DePaul (13–3) | Oklahoma (15–4) | Oklahoma (17–4) | Duke (17–4) | Syracuse (19–4) | Louisiana Tech (24–2) | Duke (21–6) | North Carolina (24–8) | 7. |
| 8. | Memphis State | Washington (0–0) | SMU (1–0) | Washington (4–0) | St. John's (5–1) | Illinois (11–2) | Georgia Tech (9–1) | Oklahoma (10–3) | Indiana (11–3) | North Carolina (14–3) | Georgia Tech (15–3) | Michigan (16–3) | Syracuse (16–4) | Georgia Tech (18–5) | North Carolina (21–6) | Louisiana Tech (25–2) | Louisiana Tech (27–2) | 8. |
| 9. | Washington | SMU (1–0) | Washington (2–0) | NC State (5–0) | Syracuse (5–0) | DePaul (7–2) | North Carolina (8–1) | Georgia Tech (10–2) | Kansas (12–2) | Oklahoma (13–4) | Syracuse (12–3) | Illinois (18–5) | SMU (18–4) | SMU (20–5) | UNLV (23–3) | Georgia Tech (21–7) | UNLV (27–3) | 9. |
| 10. | SMU | Oklahoma (1–1) | NC State (2–0) | Syracuse (4–0) | North Carolina (5–0) | Georgia Tech (6–1) | DePaul (8–2) | Kansas (10–2) | DePaul (10–3) | Oregon State (14–1) | Michigan (14–3) | Georgia Tech (16–4) | Kansas (20–4) | Louisiana Tech (22–2) | Georgia Tech (19–6) | Kansas (24–6) | Duke (22–7) | 10. |
| 11. | UNLV | NC State (1–0) | Indiana (1–1) | Virginia Tech (4–0) | Oklahoma (6–2) | Washington (5–1) | Kansas (8–2) | Indiana (9–3) | Illinois (13–4) | Syracuse (11–2) | North Carolina (14–4) | UNLV (17–2) | Iowa (19–4) | UNLV (20–3) | Kansas (22–6) | UNLV (24–3) | VCU (25–5) | 11. |
| 12. | Syracuse | Indiana (0–1) | Syracuse (1–0) | Georgia Tech (3–0) | Louisville (4–1) | Kansas (8–1) | Indiana (8–2) | Boston College (10–1) | Louisiana Tech (13–1) | Louisiana Tech (15–1) | Tulsa (16–2) | Iowa (18–4) | Louisiana Tech (20–2) | Tulsa (19–4) | Syracuse (19–6) | VCU (25–5) | Illinois (24–8) | 12. |
| 13. | NC State | UAB (3–0) | LSU (2–0) | North Carolina (4–0) | Georgia Tech (4–1) | Michigan (8–0) | Oklahoma (9–3) | DePaul (9–3) | Oklahoma (11–3) | Indiana (11–4) | DePaul (13–4) | Kansas (18–4) | North Carolina (18–5) | North Carolina (19–6) | SMU (21–6) | Syracuse (20–7) | Kansas (25–7) | 13. |
| 14. | LSU | Syracuse (0–0) | Virginia Tech (2–0) | Louisville (3–1) | NC State (5–1) | NC State (6–1) | LSU (8–1) | Louisiana Tech (11–1) | Oregon State (13–1) | Villanova (12–3) | Oregon State (14–2) | Louisiana Tech (18–2) | UNLV (18–3) | Iowa (19–6) | Georgia (19–6) | Illinois (22–8) | Loyola-Chicago (25–5) | 14. |
| 15. | Virginia Tech | Virginia Tech (1–0) | Georgia Tech (3–0) | Oklahoma (5–2) | Kansas (7–1) | Indiana (6–2) | Washington (7–2) | Illinois (11–4) | Boston College (11–2) | Kansas (13–3) | Louisiana Tech (16–2) | North Carolina (16–5) | Tulsa (18–4) | Kansas (20–6) | Tulsa (20–5) | Tulsa (21–6) | Syracuse (21–8) | 15. |
| 16. | Arkansas | LSU (0–0) | North Carolina (2–0) | Indiana (2–2) | Indiana (5–2) | Virginia Tech (7–1) | Michigan (8–1) | Villanova (9–1) | VCU (10–1) | Georgia Tech (13–3) | UNLV (15–2) | Oregon State (16–4) | Villanova (15–6) | Illinois (20–7) | NC State (18–7) | Loyola-Chicago (22–5) | NC State (20–9) | 16. |
| 17. | Louisville | Arkansas (1–0) | Oklahoma (2–2) | UAB (5–1) | Virginia Tech (6–1) | Oklahoma (6–3) | NC State (7–2) | Michigan State (11–1) | Georgia Tech (10–3) | Tulsa (14–2) | Maryland (16–5) | Tulsa (17–3) | Illinois (18–7) | VCU (20–4) | VCU (21–5) | Georgia (20–7) | Texas Tech (23–7) | 17. |
| 18. | Kentucky | Georgia Tech (1–0) | UAB (4–1) | Kansas (6–1) | Michigan (6–0) | LSU (6–1) | Louisiana Tech (10–1) | VCU (9–1) | Villanova (9–3) | Michigan (12–3) | Villanova (13–4) | DePaul (14–5) | Oregon State (17–4) | Georgia (17–6) | Illinois (21–8) | NC State (19–8) | Tulsa (23–7) | 18. |
| 19. | Kansas | North Carolina (1–0) | Kansas (3–1) | LSU (4–1) | LSU (4–1) | Louisiana Tech (9–0) | Maryland (10–2) | Iowa (13–2) | Michigan State (12–2) | VCU (12–2) | Kansas (15–4) | Villanova (14–5) | UAB (21–5) | Oregon State (18–5) | Arizona (20–7) | LSU (19–8) | Georgia (21–8) | 19. |
| 20. | Georgia Tech | Kansas (2–1); UNLV (0–1) | UNLV (1–1) | Michigan (5–0) | Louisiana Tech (8–0) | Louisville (6–2) | VCU (8–1) | Oregon State (11–1) | Tulsa (11–2) | UNLV (13–2) | UAB (18–4) | Maryland (18–6) | Maryland (19–7) | Boston College (18–6) | Loyola-Chicago (20–5) | SMU (21–8) | LSU (19–9) | 20. |
| | Preseason | Week 1 Nov. 26 | Week 2 Dec. 3 | Week 3 Dec. 10 | Week 4 Dec. 17 | Week 5 Dec. 24 | Week 6 Dec. 31 | Week 7 Jan. 7 | Week 8 Jan. 14 | Week 9 Jan. 21 | Week 10 Jan. 28 | Week 11 Feb. 4 | Week 12 Feb. 11 | Week 13 Feb. 18 | Week 14 Feb. 25 | Week 15 Mar. 4 | Final Mar. 11 | |
| | | Dropped: Kentucky (0–0) | Dropped: Arkansas | Dropped: UNLV | Dropped: UAB | None | Dropped: Virginia Tech; Louisville | Dropped: LSU (9–2); Washington (9–3); Michigan; NC State; Maryland | Dropped: Iowa | Dropped: Boston College; Michigan State | Dropped: Indiana; VCU | Dropped: UAB (19–5) | Dropped: DePaul (15–6) | Dropped: Villanova; UAB (21–6); Maryland | Dropped: Iowa; Oregon State; Boston College | Dropped: Arizona | Dropped: SMU | |

== Coaches Poll ==
| | Week 1 Nov. 26 | Week 2 Dec. 3 | Week 3 Dec. 10 | Week 4 Dec. 17 | Week 5 Dec. 24 | Week 6 Dec. 31 | Week 7 Jan. 7 | Week 8 Jan. 14 | Week 9 Jan. 21 | Week 10 Jan. 28 | Week 11 Feb. 4 | Week 12 Feb. 11 | Week 13 Feb. 18 | Week 14 Feb. 25 | Week 15 Mar. 4 | Final Mar. 11 | |
|---|---|---|---|---|---|---|---|---|---|---|---|---|---|---|---|---|---|
| 1. | Georgetown (1–0) | Georgetown (3–0) | Georgetown (5–0) | Georgetown (7–0) | Georgetown (9–0) | Georgetown (11–0) | Georgetown (13–0) | Georgetown (15–0) | Georgetown (17–0) | St. John's (15–1) | St. John's (18–1) | St. John's (19–1) | St. John's (22–1) | St. John's (24–1) | Georgetown (27–2) | Georgetown (30–2) | 1. |
| 2. | DePaul (1–0) | DePaul (2–0) | DePaul (5–0) | Duke (5–0) | Duke (7–0) | Duke (9–0) | Duke (10–0) | Duke (12–0) | SMU (15–1) | Georgetown (18–1) | Georgetown (19–2) | Georgetown (21–2) | Georgetown (23–2) | Georgetown (25–2) | St. John's (25–2) | Michigan (25–3) | 2. |
| 3. | St. John's (0–0) | St. John's (2–0) | Duke (5–0) | Illinois (10–1) | SMU (9–0) | Memphis State (8–0) | SMU (11–1) | SMU (14–1) | St. John's (13–1) | Memphis State (15–1) | Memphis State (17–1) | Memphis State (17–2) | Oklahoma (21–4) | Michigan (21–3) | Michigan (23–3) | St. John's (27–3) | 3. |
| 4. | Louisville (1–0) | Duke (3–0) | St. John's (5–0) | Memphis State (5–0) | Memphis State (8–0) | St. John's (8–1) | St. John's (10–1) | St. John's (11–1) | Memphis State (13–1) | SMU (16–2) | SMU (18–2) | Duke (17–4) | Memphis State (20–2) | Memphis State (22–2) | Memphis State (24–3) | Memphis State (27–3) | 4. |
| 5. | Illinois (3–1) | Illinois (5–1) | Memphis State (4–0) | DePaul (6–1) | North Carolina (7–0) | Syracuse (8–0) | Memphis State (9–1) | Memphis State (11–1) | Duke (13–2) | Duke (14–3) | Duke (16–3) | Oklahoma (19–4) | Duke (18–4) | Duke (20–5) | Oklahoma (25–5) | Oklahoma (28–5) | 5. |
| 6. | Duke (0–0) | Memphis State (2–0) | Illinois (9–1) | SMU (6–0) | Syracuse (6–0) | Illinois (11–2) | North Carolina (10–1) | Syracuse (10–1) | Illinois (15–4) | Oklahoma (15–4) | Illinois (18–5) | Georgia Tech (18–4) | Michigan (20–3) | Oklahoma (22–5) | Louisiana Tech (25–2) | Georgia Tech (24–7) | 6. |
| 7. | Memphis State (0–0) | Louisville (2–0) | SMU (4–0) | Washington (4–0) | Illinois (11–2) | Georgia Tech (9–1) | Oklahoma (10–3) | North Carolina (12–2) | Oklahoma (13–4) | Illinois (17–4) | Georgia Tech (16–4) | Michigan (18–3) | Syracuse (19–4) | Louisiana Tech (24–2) | North Carolina (22–7) | North Carolina (24–8) | 7. |
| 8. | SMU (1–0) | Washington (2–0) | NC State (5–0) | St. John's (5–1) | St. John's (6–1) | SMU (9–1) | Syracuse (8–1) | Kansas (12–2) | Oregon State (14–1) | Syracuse (12–3) | Syracuse (15–3) | Syracuse (16–4) | SMU (20–5) | Kansas (22–6) | Kansas (24–6) | Louisiana Tech (27–2) | 8. |
| 9. | Washington (0–0) | SMU (1–0) | Washington (4–0) | North Carolina (5–0) | DePaul (7–2) | North Carolina (8–1) | Kansas (10–2) | Indiana (11–3) | North Carolina (14–3) | Georgia Tech (15–3) | Oklahoma (17–4) | SMU (18–4) | Georgia Tech (18–5) | SMU (21–6) | Duke (21–6) | UNLV (27–3) | 9. |
| 10. | Oklahoma (1–1) | NC State (2–0) | Syracuse (4–0) | Syracuse (5–0) | Indiana (6–2) | DePaul (8–2) | Georgia Tech (10–2) | Oklahoma (11–3) | DePaul (13–3) | Tulsa (16–2) | Michigan (16–3) | Kansas (20–4) | Louisiana Tech (22–2) | UNLV (23–3) | UNLV (24–3) | Illinois (24–8) | 10. |
| 11. | UAB (3–0) | LSU (2–0) | Virginia Tech (4–0) | Oklahoma (6–2) | Kansas (8–1) | Kansas (8–2) | Indiana (9–3) | Oregon State (13–1) | Louisiana Tech (15–1) | Michigan (14–3) | Oregon State (16–4) | Iowa (19–4) | UNLV (20–3) | North Carolina (21–6) | Georgia Tech (21–7) | VCU (25–5) | 11. |
| 12. | NC State (1–0) | Indiana (1–1) | North Carolina (4–0) т | Kansas (7–1) | Washington (5–1) | Indiana (8–2) | Oregon State (11–1) | Louisiana Tech (13–1) | Syracuse (11–2) | Oregon State (14–2) | UNLV (17–2) | North Carolina (18–5) | Tulsa (19–4) | Syracuse (19–6) | Syracuse (20–7) | Duke (22–7) | 12. |
| 13. | Indiana (0–1) | Syracuse (1–0) | Oklahoma (5–2) т | Georgia Tech (4–1) | Georgia Tech (6–1) | Washington (7–2) | Louisiana Tech (11–1) | Illinois (13–4) | Indiana (11–4) | UNLV (15–2) | Iowa (18–4) | Louisiana Tech (20–2) | Kansas (20–6) | Georgia Tech (19–6) | Tulsa (21–6) | Kansas (25–7) | 13. |
| 14. | LSU (0–0) | Georgia Tech (3–0) | Georgia Tech (3–0) | Indiana (5–2) | Michigan (8–0) | Oklahoma (9–3) | Michigan State (11–1) | DePaul (10–3) | Kansas (13–3) | North Carolina (14–4) | Kansas (18–4) | Tulsa (18–4) | Illinois (20–7) | Tulsa (20–5) | Illinois (22–8) | Tulsa (23–7) | 14. |
| 15. | Kansas (2–1) | UAB (4–1) | Kansas (6–1) | Louisville (4–1) | Arkansas (8–1) | LSU (8–1) | DePaul (9–3) | Georgia Tech (10–3) | Villanova (12–3) | DePaul (13–4) | North Carolina (16–5) | Illinois (18–7) | North Carolina (19–6) | Georgia (19–6) | VCU (25–5) | Syracuse (21–8) | 15. |
| 16. | UNLV (0–1) | Oklahoma (2–2) | Indiana (2–2) | Arkansas (5–1) | Louisiana Tech (9–0) | Maryland (10–2) | Illinois (11–4) | Villanova (9–3) | Tulsa (14–2) | Louisiana Tech (16–2) | Louisiana Tech (18–2) | UNLV (18–3) | Iowa (19–6) | Illinois (21–8) | SMU (21–8) | Texas Tech (23–7) | 16. |
| 17. | Kentucky (0–0) | Kansas (3–1) | Louisville (3–1) | NC State (5–1) | Oklahoma (6–3) | Michigan (8–1) | Boston College (10–1) | Boston College (11–2) | Georgia Tech (13–3) | Maryland (16–5) | Tulsa (17–3) | Oregon State (17–4) | Oregon State (18–5) | Arizona (20–7) | NC State (19–8) | Loyola-Chicago (25–5) | 17. |
| 18. | Arkansas (1–0) | North Carolina (2–0) | UAB (5–1) | Maryland (7–1) | Virginia Tech (7–1) | Louisiana Tech (10–1) | LSU (9–2) | Michigan State (12–2) | Washington (12–5) | Villanova (13–4) | Villanova (14–5) | Villanova (15–6) | VCU (20–4) | VCU (21–5) | Loyola-Chicago (22–5) | NC State (20–9) | 18. |
| 19. | North Carolina (1–0) | Virginia Tech (2–0) | LSU (4–1) | LSU (4–1) | LSU (6–1) | VCU (8–1) | Washington (9–3) | VCU (10–1) | UNLV (13–2) т | UAB (18–4) | Maryland (18–6) | Maryland (19–7) | Maryland (19–9) | NC State (18–7) | LSU (19–8) | LSU (19–9) | 19. |
| 20. | Virginia Tech (1–0) | UNLV (1–1) | Arkansas (3–1) т Louisiana Tech (5–0) т | Michigan (6–0) | Maryland (8–1) | Ohio State (8–1) | Villanova (9–1) | Tulsa (11–2) | UAB (13–4) т | Kansas (15–4) | UAB (19–5) | DePaul (15–6) | UAB (21–6) т USC (16–6) т | LSU (17–8) | Georgia (20–7) | Michigan State (19–9) | 20. |
| | Week 1 Nov. 26 | Week 2 Dec. 3 | Week 3 Dec. 10 | Week 4 Dec. 17 | Week 5 Dec. 24 | Week 6 Dec. 31 | Week 7 Jan. 7 | Week 8 Jan. 14 | Week 9 Jan. 21 | Week 10 Jan. 28 | Week 11 Feb. 4 | Week 12 Feb. 11 | Week 13 Feb. 18 | Week 14 Feb. 25 | Week 15 Mar. 4 | Final Mar. 11 | |
| | | Dropped: Kentucky; Arkansas | None | Dropped: Virginia Tech (6–1); UAB; Louisiana Tech | Dropped: NC State | Dropped: Arkansas; Virginia Tech | Dropped: Maryland; Michigan; VCU (9–1); Ohio State | Dropped: LSU; Washington | Dropped: Boston College; Michigan State; VCU | Dropped: Washington | Dropped: DePaul (14–5) | Dropped: UAB | Dropped: Villanova; DePaul | Dropped: Iowa; Oregon State; Maryland; UAB; USC | Dropped: Arizona | Dropped: SMU; Georgia (21–8) | |
