= 1984–85 Louisville Cardinals men's basketball team =

American college basketball season

1984–85 Louisville Cardinals men's basketball

1985 National Invitation Tournament, Semifinal
- Conference: Metro Conference (1975–1995)
- Record: 19–18 (6-8 Metro Conference)
- Head coach: Denny Crum (14th season)
- Home arena: Freedom Hall

1984–85 Metro Conference men's basketball standings
	Conf.				Overall
Team	W		L	PCT	W		L	PCT
No. 5 Memphis State †	13	–	1	.929	31	–	4	.886
Virginia Tech	10	–	4	.714	20	–	9	.690
Cincinnati	8	–	6	.571	17	–	14	.548
South Carolina	6	–	8	.429	15	–	13	.536
Tulane	6	–	8	.429	15	–	13	.536
Louisville	6	–	8	.429	19	–	18	.514
Florida State	4	–	10	.286	14	–	16	.467
Southern Miss	3	–	11	.214	7	–	21	.250
† 1985 Metro Conference tournament winner Rankings from AP Poll

The 1984–85 Louisville Cardinals men's basketball team represented the University of Louisville in NCAA Division I men's competition in the 1984–85 season. Coached by Denny Crum, the Cardinals appeared in the semifinals of the 1985 National Invitation Tournament. The Cardinals lost to the UCLA team, the eventual NIT champions. The Cardinals played their home games at Freedom Hall.

On February 26, the Cardinals were humiliated by Tulane 68–56 in New Orleans, the Green Wave's first win vs. Louisville after 18 consecutive losses to their Metro Conference rival. Five weeks later, Tulane president Eamon Kelly announced the school was permanently disbanding its men's basketball program in the wake of a massive point shaving scandal (Kelly reversed this decision in 1988, and Tulane returned to the court in 1989–90).

== National Invitation Tournament ==
- First Round
  - Louisville 77, Alcorn State 75
- Second Round
  - Louisville 68, South Florida 61
- Quarterfinal
  - Louisville 71, Tennessee-Chattanooga 66
- Seminfinal
  - UCLA 75, Louisville 66
