= Georgia Bulldogs basketball statistical leaders =

The Georgia Bulldogs basketball statistical leaders are individual statistical leaders of the Georgia Bulldogs basketball program in various categories, including points, rebounds, assists, steals, and blocks. Within those areas, the lists identify single-game, single-season, and career leaders. The Bulldogs represent the University of Georgia in the NCAA's Southeastern Conference.

Georgia began competing in intercollegiate basketball in 1895. However, the school's record book does not generally list records from before the 1950s, as records from before this period are often incomplete and inconsistent. Since scoring was much lower in this era, and teams played much fewer games during a typical season, it is likely that few or no players from this era would appear on these lists anyway.

The NCAA did not officially record assists as a stat until the 1983–84 season, and blocks and steals until the 1985–86 season, but Georgia's record books includes players in these stats before these seasons. These lists are updated through the end of the 2020–21 season.

== Scoring ==
Career
Rank	Player	Points	Seasons
1	Litterial Green	2111	1988–89 1989–90 1990–91 1991–92
2	Yante Maten	1886	2014–15 2015–16 2016–17 2017–18
3	Alec Kessler	1788	1986–87 1987–88 1988–89 1989–90
4	Vern Fleming	1777	1980–81 1981–82 1982–83 1983–84
5	Dominique Wilkins	1688	1979–80 1980–81 1981–82
6	Walter Daniels	1679	1975–76 1976–77 1977–78 1978–79
7	Bob Lienhard	1659	1967–68 1968–69 1969–70
8	J. J. Frazier	1628	2013–14 2014–15 2015–16 2016–17
9	Shandon Anderson	1517	1992–93 1993–94 1994–95 1995–96
10	Terry Fair	1492	1979–80 1980–81 1981–82 1982–83

Season
Rank	Player	Points	Season
1	Dominique Wilkins	732	1980–81
2	Dominique Wilkins	659	1981–82
3	Jacky Dorsey	646	1974–75
4	J. J. Frazier	640	2016–17
5	Yante Maten	636	2017–18
6	Walter Daniels	613	1978–79
7	Alec Kessler	610	1989–90
	Anthony Edwards	610	2019–20
9	Alec Kessler	596	1988–89
10	Bob Lienhard	594	1968–69
	Vern Fleming	594	1983–84

Single game
Rank	Player	Points	Season	Opponent
1	Alfred Scott	62	1917–18	SE Christian
2	Ronnie Hogue	46	1971–72	LSU
3	Bob Lienhard	45	1967–68	Alabama
4	Bob Lienhard	44	1967–68	Arkansas A&M
	Vern Fleming	44	1983–84	Vanderbilt
6	Jacky Dorsey	43	1974–75	So. Miss
7	Jacky Dorsey	41	1974–75	LSU
8	Zippy Morocco	38	1952–53	Tennessee
	Litterial Green	38	1990–91	Kentucky
	Litterial Green	38	1991–92	UCLA

== Rebounds ==
Career
Rank	Player	Rebounds	Seasons
1	Bob Lienhard	1116	1967–68 1968–69 1969–70
2	Terry Fair	923	1979–80 1980–81 1981–82 1982–83
3	Alec Kessler	893	1986–87 1987–88 1988–89 1989–90
4	Yante Maten	889	2014–15 2015–16 2016–17 2017–18
5	Jerry Waller	867	1963–64 1964–65 1965–66
6	Charles Claxton	840	1991–92 1992–93 1993–94 1994–95
7	LaVon Mercer	838	1976–77 1977–78 1978–79 1979–80
8	Derek Ogbeide	797	2015–16 2016–17 2017–18 2018–19
9	Chris Daniels	763	2000–01 2001–02 2002–03 2003–04
10	Carlos Strong	739	1992–93 1993–94 1994–95 1995–96

Season
Rank	Player	Rebounds	Season
1	Bob Lienhard	396	1968–69
2	Bob Lienhard	373	1967–68
3	Tim Bassett	368	1972–73
4	Jerry Waller	356	1963–64
5	Bob Lienhard	347	1969–70
6	Tim Bassett	337	1971–72
7	Alec Kessler	301	1988–89
8	Alec Kessler	300	1989–90
9	Jumaine Jones	299	1997–98
10	Jacky Dorsey	296	1974–75

Single game
Rank	Player	Rebounds	Season	Opponent
1	Bob Lienhard	32	1968–69	Sewanee
2	Bob Lienhard	29	1968–69	LSU
3	Bob Lienhard	26	1967–68	Arkansas A&M
	Bob Lienhard	26	1967–68	Ga. Tech
5	Bill Ensley	25	1955–56	Ga. Tech
	Bob Lienhard	25	1967–68	Furman
	Bob Lienhard	25	1968–69	Furman
8	Jerry Waller	24	1963–64	Alabama
	Bob Lienhard	24	1969–70	Kentucky
10	Henry Cabaniss	23	1957–58	Ga. Tech
	Bob Lienhard	23	1967–68	N.C. State
	Bob Lienhard	23	1967–68	LSU
	Bob Lienhard	23	1967–68	Alabama

== Assists ==
Career
Rank	Player	Assists	Seasons
1	Rashad Wright	493	2000–01 2001–02 2002–03 2003–04
2	Sundiata Gaines	476	2004–05 2005–06 2006–07 2007–08
3	Litterial Green	466	1988–89 1989–90 1990–91 1991–92
4	G.G. Smith	440	1995–96 1996–97 1997–98 1998–99
5	J. J. Frazier	422	2013–14 2014–15 2015–16 2016–17
6	Vern Fleming	400	1980–81 1981–82 1982–83 1983–84
	Dustin Ware	400	2008–09 2009–10 2010–11 2011–12
	Charles Mann	400	2012–13 2013–14 2014–15 2015–16
9	Pertha Robinson	399	1992–93 1993–94 1994–95 1995–96
10	Rod Cole	379	1987–88 1988–89 1989–90 1990–91

Season
Rank	Player	Assists	Season
1	Sahvir Wheeler	193	2020–21
2	Pertha Robinson	169	1994–95
3	Aaron Cook	166	2021–22
4	Sundiata Gaines	154	2006–07
5	Rashad Wright	153	2001–02
6	Donald Hartry	152	1985–86
7	J. J. Frazier	151	2015–16
8	Willie Anderson	150	1986–87
9	Rashad Wright	149	2002–03
10	G.G. Smith	148	1996–97
	G.G. Smith	148	1997–98

Single game
Rank	Player	Assists	Season	Opponent
1	Gino Gianfrancesco	15	1971–72	Ga. Tech
2	Herb White	14	1969–70	Vanderbilt
3	Gino Gianfrancesco	13	1972–73	Bucknell
	Sahvir Wheeler	13	2020–21	LSU
	Sahvir Wheeler	13	2020–21	Missouri
6	Gino Gianfrancesco	12	1971–72	LSU
	Pertha Robinson	12	1994–95	Ga. Southern
	Pertha Robinson	12	1994–95	Arkansas
	G.G. Smith	12	1998–99	Vanderbilt
	Sahvir Wheeler	12	2020–21	Florida A&M
	Aaron Cook	12	2021–22	Western Carolina

== Steals ==
Career
Rank	Player	Steals	Seasons
1	Sundiata Gaines	259	2004–05 2005–06 2006–07 2007–08
2	Pat Hamilton	216	1984–85 1985–86 1986–87 1987–88 1988–89
3	Shandon Anderson	212	1992–93 1993–94 1994–95 1995–96
4	Vern Fleming	205	1980–81 1981–82 1982–83 1983–84
5	Gerald Crosby	202	1981–82 1982–83 1983–84 1984–85
6	Terry Fair	194	1979–80 1980–81 1981–82 1982–83
7	Rod Cole	191	1987–88 1988–89 1989–90 1990–91
8	Levi Stukes	179	2003–04 2004–05 2005–06 2006–07
9	Ray Harrison	177	1995–96 1996–97 1997–98 1998–99
10	Rashad Wright	168	2000–01 2001–02 2002–03 2003–04
	Chris Daniels	168	2000–01 2001–02 2002–03 2003–04

Season
Rank	Player	Steals	Season
1	Pat Hamilton	89	1987–88
2	Pat Hamilton	84	1988–89
3	Lamar Heard	81	1982–83
4	Sundiata Gaines	72	2006–07
5	Terry Fair	70	1982–83
	Katu Davis	70	1995–96
7	Gerald Crosby	69	1983–84
8	Willie Anderson	67	1987–88
9	Sundiata Gaines	66	2004–05
10	Kentavious Caldwell-Pope	65	2012–13

Single game
Rank	Player	Steals	Season	Opponent
1	Gerald Crosby	7	1982–83	Ole Miss
	Gerald Crosby	7	1982–83	Florida
	Pat Hamilton	7	1987–88	UNC Asheville
	Pat Hamilton	7	1988–89	Auburn
	Kendall Rhine	7	1991–92	Mercer
	Chris Daniels	7	2001–02	LSU
	Billy Humphrey	7	2006–07	S. Carolina

== Blocks ==
Career
Rank	Player	Blocks	Seasons
1	LaVon Mercer	302	1976–77 1977–78 1978–79 1979–80
2	Charles Claxton	247	1991–92 1992–93 1993–94 1994–95
3	Yante Maten	199	2014–15 2015–16 2016–17 2017–18
4	Terrell Bell	168	1992–93 1993–94 1994–95 1995–96
5	Dominique Wilkins	142	1979–80 1980–81 1981–82
6	Donte' Williams	136	2010–11 2011–12 2012–13 2013–14
7	Somto Cyril	125	2024–25 2025–26
8	Willie Anderson	123	1984–85 1985–86 1986–87 1987–88
	Nic Claxton	123	2017–18 2018–19
10	Marcus Thornton	120	2010–11 2011–12 2012–13 2013–14 2014–15

Season
Rank	Player	Blocks	Season
1	Charles Claxton	94	1994–95
2	LaVon Mercer	88	1977–78
3	Terrell Bell	83	1995–96
4	LaVon Mercer	82	1976–77
5	Nic Claxton	81	2018–19
6	LaVon Mercer	76	1979–80
7	Somto Cyril	74	2025–26
8	Yante Maten	61	2015–16
9	Antonio Harvey	60	1990–91
10	Charles Claxton	58	1993–94

Single game
Rank	Player	Blocks	Season	Opponent
1	Lucius Foster	9	1975–76	Ole Miss
	Charles Claxton	9	1994–95	Winthrop
	Charles Claxton	9	1994–95	Florida
	Terrell Bell	9	1993–94	Bethune-Cookman
5	Terrell Bell	8	1994–95	Ole Miss
	Terrell Bell	8	1995–96	W. Carolina
	Somtochukwu Cyril	8	2025–26	Arkansas
8	LaVon Mercer	7	1976–77	Miss. St.
	LaVon Mercer	7	1976–77	Tennessee
	LaVon Mercer	7	1978–79	Florida
	Charles Claxton	7	1994–95	Jacksonville
	Charles Claxton	7	1994–95	Pittsburgh
	Terrell Bell	7	1995–96	Purdue
	Rashaad Singleton	7	2007–08	Jacksonville St.
