= Bobby Lee Hurt =

American basketball player

Personal information
- Born: December 6, 1961 (age 64) Huntsville, Alabama, U.S.
- Listed height: 6 ft 9 in (2.06 m)
- Listed weight: 240 lb (109 kg)

Career information
- High school: S. R. Butler (Huntsville, Alabama)
- College: Alabama (1981–1985)
- NBA draft: 1986: 6th round, 121st overall pick
- Drafted by: Golden State Warriors
- Playing career: 1986–1994
- Position: Power forward / center

Career history
- 1986–1988: Tofaş
- 1988–1989: Wichita Falls Texans
- 1989: Auxilium Torino
- 1989–1990: Tenerife AB
- 1990–1991: Trapani
- 1991–1992: Auxilium Torino
- 1992–1993: Trapani
- 1993–1994: Tofaş

Career highlights
- 2× Second-team All-SEC (1984, 1985); McDonald's All-American (1981); Second-team Parade All-American (1981)
- Stats at Basketball Reference

Bobby Lee Hurt (born December 6, 1961) is an American former professional basketball player. A strong and athletic big man, he was one of the top high school prospects of the 1981 class. After a controversial recruitment, Hurt committed to Alabama and played 4 seasons with the Crimson Tide: he holds the Alabama record for highest field goal percentage in a season (.664 in 1983–84) and in a career (.631). After a successful college career he was drafted by the Golden State Warriors in the second round of the 1985 NBA draft, and then again in 1986. However, he failed to reach an economical agreement with the Warriors and went on to play professionally in Europe in the top divisions of Turkey, Italy and Spain.

== High school career ==
Hurt was born and raised in Huntsville, Alabama, where he attended S. R. Butler High School. Growing up he showed athleticism and a predisposition for sports: he reportedly ran the 100-meter dash in under 10 seconds and high jumped 7 ft in his high school years. He also started playing basketball in his school's varsity team under coach Jerry Rice, and soon experienced success in state competitions: as a sophomore in 1979 he was named MVP of the 4A state tournament and was named in the All-Tournament team.

During his senior year he averaged 20.2 points and 13.3 rebounds while shooting 69% from the field. Butler ended the season with a 33–3 record and competed in the Class 4A state tournament, finishing at second place after losing 60–58 to Hayes in the final game. In that tournament, Hurt scored 103 points in four games and recorded 68 rebounds, 26 blocks and 17 assists . He won the tournament MVP award for the second time in his career, and again was named in the All-Tournament team. Hurt was selected in the Parade All-America Second Team and earned a spot in the McDonald's All-American team: in the 1981 McDonald's All-American Boys Game he played 17 minutes and he recorded 12 rebounds, 3 blocks and 3 steals; he also scored 19 points, shooting 9/11 from the field and 1/4 from the free throw line. Hurt's 2,288 points at Butler during his 4-year career from 1977 to 1981 are a school record.

== College career ==
Hurt was heavily recruited by many colleges during his high school career, since he was the top ranked recruit in the state of Alabama. He considered Alabama, Indiana, Louisville, Maryland and North Carolina, and later South Alabama and Hawaii. During his recruitment he was also under investigation from the NCAA: during his high school career it was alleged that he had received money for various reasons, including $1,100 to pay for dentist bills, from his high school principal Edward Seal. Seal later resigned from his position at Butler. It was also reported that Hurt had contracted a car loan together with Cotton Johnson, a local business owner and Alabama supporter, and that Johnson threatened to make Hurt pay the whole loan and an extra $3,400 had he not signed to play with Alabama. Hurt ultimately signed with Alabama on April 30, 1981, after having restricted his final choice between Alabama, Hawaii and Maryland.

At Alabama he chose to wear jersey number 34 and during his freshman year he was one of the first options off the bench for coach Wimp Sanderson, who had been hired the previous season. During his first year of college basketball he led the Crimson Tide for field goal percentage and blocks with a total of 45. He started 8 games of that season, and he averaged 10.2 points, 5.5 rebounds and 1.5 blocks while shooting 61.8%. The Crimson Tide reached the Sweet Sixteen during the 1982 NCAA tournament, losing to North Carolina.

Hurt was promoted to a starting role in his sophomore year, and he became the starting center of the team. His numbers improved significantly, and he was selected in the All-SEC 2nd team by UPI and third team by AP; he led his team in scoring (15.3), rebounding (8.9) and blocks with 50 (1.6 per game, a career high). He started all 32 games, playing a total of 1,133 minutes (35.4 per game). The Alabama team was eliminated in the first round of the 1983 NCAA tournament by Lamar.

In his junior year Hurt recorded career-highs in several major statistical categories: he was second on the team in scoring with 15.6 points per game behind Buck Johnson's 17.0, and he led the team in rebounds with a 9.1 average. He also recorded 41 blocks, a team high, and shot .664 from the field, which set the all-time record for Alabama. He started all 30 of his games and he played 36.1 minutes on average. He was selected in the All-SEC 1st team by UPI, and in 2nd team by AP. Alabama was the number 9 seed in the Midwest, and lost in the round of 48 to Illinois State during the 1984 NCAA tournament.

Hurt's senior year saw him start all 33 games, and he averaged 12.8 points and 8.6 rebounds: he was second in both categories to junior Buck Johnson. He recorded a total 51 blocks, a career high, and for the fourth year in a row he led the team in blocks per game. He was selected in the 2nd team All-SEC by both AP and UPI. Alabama was the 7th seed in the West and advanced to the Sweet Sixteen, where they lost to no. 3 NC State.

Hurt is Alabama all-time leader for field goal percentage in a season (.664, 168 of 255 field goals) in 1983–84 and in a career (.631, 646 of 1024). He also holds the record for highest field goal percentage (100%) when he went 11 for 11 on December 20, 1982, against Texas Southern. He led Alabama for 4 straight years for field goal percentage and blocks. He recorded totals of 1,697 points and 1,012 rebounds. He started 103 of his 126 games at Alabama.

=== College statistics ===
Year	Team	GP	GS	MPG	FG%	3P%	FT%	RPG	APG	SPG	BPG	PPG
1981–82	Alabama	31	8	25.6	.618	–	.591	5.5	.4	–	1.5	10.2
1982–83	Alabama	32	32	35.4	.611	–	.694	8.9	.5	–	1.6	15.3
1983–84	Alabama	30	30	36.1	.664	–	.720	9.1	.7	.7	1.4	15.6
1984–85	Alabama	33	33	35.5	.633	–	.594	8.6	.3	.6	1.5	12.8
Career		126	103	33.2	.631	–	.656	8.0	.5	.7	1.5	13.5

== Professional career ==
After the end of his senior year of college Hurt was automatically eligible for the 1985 NBA draft. The Golden State Warriors selected him in the second round with the 42nd overall pick. Hurt underwent knee surgery in the offseason, and he and his agent had a disagreement with the Warriors management, since Hurt wanted a contract with guaranteed money which the Warriors did not want to concede. He originally wanted to play in Europe, but he did not and was inactive during the 1985–86 season.

The Warriors selected him again in the sixth round of the 1986 NBA draft, with the 121st overall pick. Again, Hurt and his agent could not find an arrangement with the franchise, thinking that the money offer was insufficient: therefore, Hurt turned down the Warriors' offer and decided to play in Turkey. He signed for Tofaş S.K., a team based in Bursa, and spent two seasons in the Turkish Basketball League. Hurt would be the last American player to be selected in multiple NBA drafts following this situation, though not the last overall player to hold that distinction.

In 1988 he came back to the United States and signed for the Wichita Falls Texans in the Continental Basketball Association: in 21 games he averaged 16.2 points and 12.5 rebounds on 55.4% from the field in 34.5 minutes per game. He then moved to Italy, where he joined Auxilium Torino (which was named Ipifim Torino for sponsorship reasons): he played 21 games, averaging 18.9 points and 11.3 rebounds on 68% shooting in 37.1 minutes per game.

He transferred to Spanish team Tenerife AB for the 1989–90 season: in the Liga ACB he played 36 regular season games, starting 31, and averaged 17.2 points, 11.7 rebounds and 1.4 blocks in 39.8 minutes per game; he also played 9 games in the playoffs, averaging 13.8 points and 10.6 rebounds. He went back to Italy for the 1990–91 season, signing for Birra Messina Trapani; in 40 games he averaged a career-high 23.7 points and 12.3 rebounds on 65.1% shooting in 39.1 minutes per game. The following year he joined Auxilium again: the team had changed name to Robe di Kappa Torino. In 32 games he recorded averages of 16.8 points and 9.8 rebounds shooting 62.1% in 38.5 minutes per game.

In 1992–93 he returned to Trapani, which was named Tonno Auriga Trapani: he played 40 games and posted averages of 17.7 points and 10.0 rebounds with a 64.9% field goal percentage in 37.5 minutes per game. He ended his career in 1994 after a season with Tofaş back in Turkey.
