= 1981–82 Alabama Crimson Tide men's basketball team =

American college basketball season

1981–82 Alabama Crimson Tide men's basketball

SEC tournament champions

NCAA tournament, Regional semifinals
- Conference: Southeastern Conference

Ranking
- Coaches: No. 12
- AP: No. 13
- Record: 24–7 (12–6 SEC)
- Head coach: Wimp Sanderson (2nd season)
- Home arena: Coleman Coliseum

1981–82 Southeastern Conference men's basketball standings
| | Conf. | | | | Overall |
| Team | W | | L | PCT | W | | L | PCT |
|---|---|---|---|---|---|---|---|---|
| No. 15 Kentucky | 13 | – | 5 | .722 | 22 | – | 8 | .733 |
| Tennessee | 13 | – | 5 | .722 | 20 | – | 10 | .667 |
| No. 13 Alabama † | 12 | – | 6 | .667 | 24 | – | 7 | .774 |
| Ole Miss | 11 | – | 7 | .611 | 18 | – | 12 | .600 |
| LSU | 11 | – | 7 | .611 | 14 | – | 14 | .500 |
| Georgia | 10 | – | 8 | .556 | 19 | – | 12 | .613 |
| Vanderbilt | 7 | – | 11 | .389 | 15 | – | 13 | .536 |
| Auburn | 7 | – | 11 | .389 | 14 | – | 14 | .500 |
| Mississippi State | 4 | – | 14 | .222 | 8 | – | 19 | .296 |
| Florida | 2 | – | 16 | .111 | 5 | – | 22 | .185 |
† 1982 SEC tournament winner Rankings from AP Poll

The 1981–82 Alabama Crimson Tide men's basketball team represented the University of Alabama in the 1981–82 NCAA Division I men's basketball season. The team's head coach was Wimp Sanderson, who was in his second season at Alabama. The team played their home games at Coleman Coliseum in Tuscaloosa, Alabama. They finished the season 24–7, 12–6 in SEC play, finishing in third place.

Key freshman signees were guard Ennis Whatley and forward-center Bobby Lee Hurt.

The Tide won the conference tournament championship by winning the SEC tournament, beating the Kentucky Wildcats in the final at Rupp Arena, and won an automatic bid to the 1982 NCAA Division I men's basketball tournament, their first NCAA tournament appearance since 1976. The Tide defeated St. John's University in the opening round before losing to eventual champion North Carolina.

== Roster ==
1981–82 Alabama Crimson Tide men's basketball team
Players
Coaches

| Pos. | # | Name | Height | Weight | Year | Previous school | Hometown |
|---|---|---|---|---|---|---|---|
| F | 51 | Eddie Phillips | 6 ft 7 in (2.01 m) | — | Sr | A. H. Parker High School | Birmingham, Alabama |
| G | 3 | Ennis Whatley | 6 ft 3 in (1.91 m) | — | Fr | Phillips High School | Birmingham, Alabama |
| F/C | 34 | Bobby Lee Hurt | 6 ft 9 in (2.06 m) | — | Fr | Butler High School | Huntsville, Alabama |
| C | 41 | Phillip Lockett | 6 ft 9 in (2.06 m) | — | Sr | Livingston High School | Livingston, Alabama |
| G | 44 | Mike Davis | 6 ft 4 in (1.93 m) | — | Jr | Fayette High School | Fayette, Alabama |
| F | 33 | Cliff Windham | 6 ft 5 in (1.96 m) | — | Jr | Livingston High School | Emelle, Alabama |
| G | 4 | Eric Richardson | 6 ft 3 in (1.91 m) | — | So | Carver High School | Birmingham, Alabama |
| F | | Eugene Jones | 6 ft 6 in (1.98 m) | — | Jr |
| G | | Vance Wheeler | 6 ft 4 in (1.93 m) | — | So |
| F | 40 | Maurice Myers | 6 ft 7 in (2.01 m) | — | Jr | Holy Family High School | Birmingham, Alabama |
| F | 42 | Terry Williams | 6 ft 8 in (2.03 m) | — | So | Elkmont High School | Elkmont, Alabama |
| G | 23 | Rex Jones | 6 ft 4 in (1.93 m) | — | Fr | Bradshaw High School | Florence, Alabama |
| C | 51 | Mark Farmer | 6 ft 11 in (2.11 m) | — | Fr | Arab High School | Arab, Alabama |

Head coach

- Wimp Sanderson

Assistant coach(es)

Legend

- (C) Team captain
- (S) Suspended
- (I) Ineligible
- (W) Walk-on
- Injured
- Current redshirt

== Schedule and results ==
| Date time, TV | Rank^{#} | Opponent^{#} | Result | Record | Site city, state |
Regular Season
| November 27, 1981* | No. 20 | New Hampshire | W 99–65 | 1–0 | Memorial Coliseum; Tuscaloosa, Alabama |
| December 5, 1981* | No. 17 | Texas Tech | W 95–93 | 2–0 | Lubbock Municipal Coliseum; Lubbock, Texas |
| December 7, 1981* | No. 17 | SMU | W 69–62 | 3–0 | Moody Coliseum; University Park, Texas |
| December 12, 1981 | No. 16 | Vanderbilt | W 79–68 | 4–0 (1–0) | Memorial Coliseum; Tuscaloosa, Alabama |
| December 19, 1981* | No. 14 | Penn State | W 88–74 | 5–0 (1–0) | |
| December 28, 1981* | No. 12 | Delaware | W 84–62 | 6–0 (1–0) | |
| December 29, 1981* | No. 12 | Maine | W 77–61 | 7–0 (1–0) | |
| January 2, 1982 | No. 12 | Tennessee | L 67–88 | 7–1 (1–1) | Stokely Center; Knoxville, Tennessee |
| January 6, 1982 | No. 16 | Mississippi State | W 71–53 | 8–1 (2–1) | Humphrey Coliseum; Starkville, Mississippi |
| January 9, 1982 | No. 16 | Ole Miss | W 75–64 | 9–1 (3–1) | Memorial Coliseum; Tuscaloosa, Alabama |
| January 13, 1982 | No. 13 | LSU | W 109–86 | 10–1 (4–1) | Memorial Coliseum; Tuscaloosa, Alabama |
| January 16, 1982 | No. 13 | No. 6 Kentucky | L 69–86 | 10–2 (4–2) | Rupp Arena; Lexington, Kentucky |
| January 20, 1982 | No. 16 | Georgia | W 81–66 | 11–2 (5–2) | Memorial Coliseum; Tuscaloosa, Alabama |
| January 23, 1982 | No. 16 | Florida | W 82–71 | 12–2 (6–2) | Memorial Coliseum; Tuscaloosa, Alabama |
| January 27, 1982 | No. 13 | Auburn | W 67–65 | 13–2 (7–2) | Memorial Coliseum; Auburn, Alabama |
| January 30, 1982 | No. 13 | No. 15 Tennessee | W 77–72 | 14–2 (8–2) | Memorial Coliseum; Tuscaloosa, Alabama |
| February 3, 1982 | No. 8 | Mississippi State | W 66–63 | 15–2 (9–2) | Memorial Coliseum; Tuscaloosa, Alabama |
| February 6, 1982 | No. 8 | Ole Miss | L 69–79 | 15–3 (9–3) | Tad Smith Coliseum; Oxford, Mississippi |
| February 10, 1982 | No. 10 | LSU | L 68–73 | 15–4 (9–4) | Maravich Assembly Center; Baton Rouge, Louisiana |
| February 13, 1982 | No. 10 | No. 12 Kentucky | L 62–72 | 15–5 (9–5) | Memorial Coliseum; Tuscaloosa, Alabama |
| February 17, 1982 | No. 19 | Georgia | W 99–85 | 16–5 (10–5) | Stegeman Coliseum; Athens, Georgia |
| February 20, 1982 | No. 19 | Florida | W 70–69 | 17–5 (11–5) | O'Connell Center; Gainesville, Florida |
| February 24, 1982 | No. 17 | Auburn | W 74–72 | 18–5 (12–5) | Memorial Coliseum; Tuscaloosa, Alabama |
| February 27, 1982 | No. 17 | Vanderbilt | L 63–80 | 18–6 (12–6) | Memorial Gymnasium; Nashville, Tennessee |
SEC Tournament
| March 4, 1982 | (3) No. 18 | (6) Georgia; Second Round | W 85–74 | 19–6 | Rupp Arena; Lexington, Kentucky |
| March 5, 1982 | (3) No. 18 | (2) Tennessee; Semifinals | W 56–50 | 20–6 | Rupp Arena; Lexington, Kentucky |
| March 6, 1982 | (3) No. 18 | (1) No. 15 Kentucky; SEC Championship | W 48–46 | 21–6 | Rupp Arena; Lexington, Kentucky |
NCAA Tournament
| March 14, 1982* | (4 E) No. 13 | (5 E) St. John's; Second round | W 69–68 | 22–6 | Nassau Coliseum; Uniondale, New York |
| March 19, 1982* | (4 E) No. 13 | (1 E) No. 1 North Carolina; Regional semifinals - Sweet Sixteen | L 69–74 | 22–7 | Reynolds Coliseum; Raleigh, North Carolina |
*Non-conference game. ^{#}Rankings from AP poll. (#) Tournament seedings in parentheses. SE=Southeast.
