= 1982 SEC men's basketball tournament =

Annual college basketball tournament

- Classification: Division I
- Season: 1981–82
- Teams: 10
- Site: Rupp Arena; Lexington, Kentucky
- Champions: Alabama Crimson Tide (2nd title)
- Winning coach: Wimp Sanderson (1st title)
- MVP: Dirk Minnefield (Kentucky)
- Attendance: 154,624
- Television: TVS Television Network; NBC

1981–82 Southeastern Conference men's basketball standings
	Conf.				Overall
Team	W		L	PCT	W		L	PCT
No. 15 Kentucky	13	–	5	.722	22	–	8	.733
Tennessee	13	–	5	.722	20	–	10	.667
No. 13 Alabama †	12	–	6	.667	24	–	7	.774
Ole Miss	11	–	7	.611	18	–	12	.600
LSU	11	–	7	.611	14	–	14	.500
Georgia	10	–	8	.556	19	–	12	.613
Vanderbilt	7	–	11	.389	15	–	13	.536
Auburn	7	–	11	.389	14	–	14	.500
Mississippi State	4	–	14	.222	8	–	19	.296
Florida	2	–	16	.111	5	–	22	.185
† 1982 SEC tournament winner Rankings from AP Poll

The 1982 SEC Men's Basketball Tournament took place from March 3–6, 1982 at Rupp Arena in downtown Lexington, Kentucky, home to the University of Kentucky Wildcats men's basketball team. The Alabama Crimson Tide won the tournament and the SEC's automatic bid to the 1982 NCAA Division I Men's Basketball tournament by defeating Kentucky by a score of 48–46. The tournament win was Alabama's second SEC tournament win, but it was the program's first tournament win since the 1934 tournament.

Coverage of the entire tournament was produced and regionally syndicated by the TVS Television Network, with NBC covering the championship game for areas outside the SEC geographical footprint.

== Bracket ==
First Round
8	Auburn	38
9	Mississippi State	36
7	Vanderbilt	47
10	Florida	46

Second Round
1	#15 Kentucky	89
8	Auburn	66
4	Ole Miss	59
5	LSU	52
2	Tennessee	57
7	Vanderbilt	54
3	#18 Alabama	85
6	Georgia	74

Semi-Finals
1	#15 Kentucky	62
4	Ole Miss	58
2	Tennessee	50
3	#18 Alabama	56

Finals
1	#15 Kentucky	46
3	#18 Alabama	48
