= 1981–82 Tennessee Volunteers basketball team =

American college basketball season

1981–82 Tennessee Volunteers basketball

SEC Regular season co-champions

NCAA tournament, Second round
- Conference: Southeastern Conference
- East
- Record: 20–10 (13–5 SEC)
- Head coach: Don DeVoe (4th season)
- Home arena: Stokely Athletic Center

1981–82 Southeastern Conference men's basketball standings
	Conf.				Overall
Team	W		L	PCT	W		L	PCT
No. 15 Kentucky	13	–	5	.722	22	–	8	.733
Tennessee	13	–	5	.722	20	–	10	.667
No. 13 Alabama †	12	–	6	.667	24	–	7	.774
Ole Miss	11	–	7	.611	18	–	12	.600
LSU	11	–	7	.611	14	–	14	.500
Georgia	10	–	8	.556	19	–	12	.613
Vanderbilt	7	–	11	.389	15	–	13	.536
Auburn	7	–	11	.389	14	–	14	.500
Mississippi State	4	–	14	.222	8	–	19	.296
Florida	2	–	16	.111	5	–	22	.185
† 1982 SEC tournament winner Rankings from AP Poll

The 1981–82 Tennessee Volunteers basketball team represented the University of Tennessee as a member of the Southeastern Conference during the 1981–82 college basketball season. Led by fourth-year head coach Don DeVoe, the team played their home games at the Stokely Athletic Center in Knoxville, Tennessee. The Volunteers finished with a record of 20–10 (13–5 SEC, T-1st) and received an at-large bid to the 1982 NCAA tournament as the 9 seed in the Mideast region. After an opening round win over Southwestern Louisiana, Tennessee was defeated by No. 1 seed Virginia for the second straight season.

This was the fourth of five straight seasons of NCAA Tournament basketball for the Tennessee men's program. Junior Dale Ellis was named the SEC Player of the Year – an award he would take home the next season as well.

== Roster ==
1981–82 Tennessee Volunteers men's basketball team
Players
Coaches

Pos.	#	Name	Height	Weight	Year	Hometown
G	10	Tyrone Beaman	5 ft 11 in (1.8 m)	—	So	Niagara Falls, New York
G	12	Ed Littleton	6 ft 2 in (1.88 m)	—	Jr	Paris, Tennessee
F	14	Dale Ellis	6 ft 7 in (2.01 m)	195 lb (88 kg)	Jr	Marietta, Georgia
G	21	Michael Brooks	6 ft 3 in (1.91 m)	—	So	Memphis, Tennessee
G	22	Jerald Hyatt	6 ft 3 in (1.91 m)	—	Fr	Knoxville, Tennessee
G	23	Myron Carter	6 ft 3 in (1.91 m)	—	Fr	Madison, Tennessee
C	24	Walter Evans	6 ft 6 in (1.98 m)	—	Fr	Morristown, Tennessee
F	25	Seth McDonald	6 ft 8 in (2.03 m)	—	So	Tullahoma, Tennessee
G	30	Gary Carter	6 ft 3 in (1.91 m)	—	Sr	Johnson City, Tennessee
F	31	Kevin Woods	6 ft 5 in (1.96 m)	—	Fr	Baltimore, Maryland
F	32	Kirk Naler	6 ft 8 in (2.03 m)	—	Fr	Gadsden, Alabama
C	33	Dan Federmann	6 ft 10 in (2.08 m)	—	So	Cincinnati, Ohio
F	40	Willie Burton	6 ft 7 in (2.01 m)	—	So	Millen, Georgia
F	53	Steve Ray	6 ft 4 in (1.93 m)	—	Sr	Collinsville, Illinois
F/C	54	Randy Bates	6 ft 7 in (2.01 m)	—	So	Old Hickory, Tennessee

Head coach

- Don DeVoe (Ohio State)

Assistant coach(es)

Legend

- (C) Team captain
- (S) Suspended
- (I) Ineligible
- (W) Walk-on
- Injured
- Current redshirt

Roster

== Schedule and results ==
Date time, TV	Rank^{#}	Opponent^{#}	Result	Record	Site (attendance) city, state
Regular season
Nov 28, 1981*		at Purdue	L 68–82	0–1	Mackey Arena; West Lafayette, Indiana
Dec 8, 1981*		at Colorado	W 64–63	1–1	Coors Events Center; Boulder, Colorado
Dec 12, 1981		Auburn	W 86–79	2–1 (1–0)	Stokely Athletics Center; Knoxville, Tennessee
Dec 14, 1981		Cleveland State	W 74–58	3–1	Stokely Athletics Center; Knoxville, Tennessee
Dec 18, 1981		American; Volunteer Classic	W 59–58	4–1	Stokely Athletics Center; Knoxville, Tennessee
Dec 19, 1981		California; Volunteer Classic	W 80–48	5–1	Stokely Athletics Center; Knoxville, Tennessee
Dec 26, 1981		at Portland; Far West Classic	L 62–71	5–2	Howard Hall; Portland, Oregon
Dec 27, 1981		Wisconsin; Far West Classic	W 79–67	6–2	Howard Hall; Portland, Oregon
Dec 28, 1981		Pittsburgh; Far West Classic	L 54–55	6–3	Howard Hall; Portland, Oregon
Jan 2, 1982		No. 12 Alabama	W 88–67	7–3 (2–0)	Stokely Athletics Center; Knoxville, Tennessee
Jan 6, 1982		at Ole Miss	W 62–55	8–3 (3–0)	Tad Smith Coliseum; Oxford, Mississippi
Jan 9, 1982		No. 3 Kentucky	W 70–66	9–3 (4–0)	Stokely Athletics Center; Knoxville, Tennessee
Jan 13, 1982		at Florida	W 69–66	10–3 (5–0)	O'Connell Center; Gainesville, Florida
Jan 16, 1982		Vanderbilt	W 71–69	11–3 (6–0)	Stokely Athletics Center; Knoxville, Tennessee
Jan 20, 1982	No. 20	at Mississippi State	W 54–44	12–3 (7–0)	Humphrey Coliseum; Starkville, Mississippi
Jan 23, 1982	No. 20	LSU	W 77–67	13–3 (8–0)	Stokely Athletics Center; Knoxville, Tennessee
Jan 27, 1982	No. 15	at Georgia	W 66–64	14–3 (9–0)	Stegeman Coliseum; Athens, Georgia
Jan 30, 1982	No. 15	at No. 13 Alabama	L 72–77	14–4 (9–1)	Memorial Coliseum; Tuscaloosa, Alabama
Feb 3, 1982	No. 16	Ole Miss	L 53–55	14–5 (9–2)	Stokely Athletics Center; Knoxville, Tennessee
Feb 6, 1982	No. 16	at No. 9 Kentucky	L 67–77	14–6 (9–3)	Rupp Arena; Lexington, Kentucky
Feb 10, 1982		Florida	W 90–75	15–6 (10–3)	Stokely Athletics Center; Knoxville, Tennessee
Feb 13, 1982		at Vanderbilt	W 59–55	16–6 (11–3)	Memorial Gymnasium; Nashville, Tennessee
Feb 17, 1982		Mississippi State	W 50–48	17–6 (12–3)	Stokely Athletics Center; Knoxville, Tennessee
Feb 20, 1982		at LSU	W 54–53	18–6 (13–3)	Maravich Assembly Center; Baton Rouge, Louisiana
Feb 24, 1982		Georgia	L 63–64	18–7 (13–4)	Stokely Athletics Center; Knoxville, Tennessee
Feb 27, 1982		at Auburn	L 54–56	18–8 (13–5)	Memorial Coliseum; Auburn, Alabama
SEC tournament
Mar 4, 1982; TVS	(2)	(7) Vanderbilt; Quarterfinals	W 57–54	19–8	Rupp Arena; Lexington, Kentucky
Mar 5, 1982; TVS	(2)	(3) No. 18 Alabama; Semifinals	L 50–56	19–9	Rupp Arena; Lexington, Kentucky
NCAA tournament
Mar 12, 1982*	(9 ME)	vs. (8 ME) Southwestern Louisiana; First round	W 61–57	20–9	Market Square Arena; Indianapolis, Indiana
Mar 14, 1982*	(9 ME)	vs. (1 ME) No. 3 Virginia; Second round	L 51–54	20–10	Market Square Arena; Indianapolis, Indiana
*Non-conference game. ^{#}Rankings from AP poll. (#) Tournament seedings in parentheses. ME=Mideast. All times are in Eastern Time.
