= 1981–82 Auburn Tigers men's basketball team =

American college basketball season

1981–82 Auburn Tigers men's basketball
- Conference: Southeastern Conference
- Record: 14–14 (7–11 SEC)
- Head coach: Sonny Smith (4th season)
- Assistant coaches: Roger Banks; Mack McCarthy; Tevester Anderson
- Home arena: Memorial Coliseum

1981–82 Southeastern Conference men's basketball standings
| | Conf. | | | | Overall |
| Team | W | | L | PCT | W | | L | PCT |
|---|---|---|---|---|---|---|---|---|
| No. 15 Kentucky | 13 | – | 5 | .722 | 22 | – | 8 | .733 |
| Tennessee | 13 | – | 5 | .722 | 20 | – | 10 | .667 |
| No. 13 Alabama † | 12 | – | 6 | .667 | 24 | – | 7 | .774 |
| Ole Miss | 11 | – | 7 | .611 | 18 | – | 12 | .600 |
| LSU | 11 | – | 7 | .611 | 14 | – | 14 | .500 |
| Georgia | 10 | – | 8 | .556 | 19 | – | 12 | .613 |
| Vanderbilt | 7 | – | 11 | .389 | 15 | – | 13 | .536 |
| Auburn | 7 | – | 11 | .389 | 14 | – | 14 | .500 |
| Mississippi State | 4 | – | 14 | .222 | 8 | – | 19 | .296 |
| Florida | 2 | – | 16 | .111 | 5 | – | 22 | .185 |
† 1982 SEC tournament winner Rankings from AP Poll

The 1981–82 Auburn Tigers men's basketball team represented Auburn University in the 1981–82 college basketball season. The team was coached by Sonny Smith, who was in his fourth season.

The Tigers' key signee was freshman Charles Barkley from Leeds High School in Birmingham, Alabama. Other key newcomers were junior college transfers Odell Mostellar and .Earl Hayes

The team played their home games at Memorial Coliseum in Auburn, Alabama. They finished the season 14-14, 7–11 in SEC play. The team advanced to the second round of the 1982 SEC Men's Basketball Tournament, where they lost to Kentucky.

== Roster ==
1981–82 Auburn Tigers men's basketball team
Players
Coaches

| Pos. | # | Name | Height | Weight | Year | Previous school | Hometown |
|---|---|---|---|---|---|---|---|
| G | 12 | Odell Mostellar | 6 ft 3 in (1.91 m) | 185 lb (84 kg) | Jr | Chattooga High School | Summerville, GA |
| G | 13 | Sam Fitten | 6 ft 3 in (1.91 m) | 170 lb (77 kg) | Fr | Dadeville High School | Dadeville, AL |
| G | 14 | Tim James | 6 ft 0 in (1.83 m) | 160 lb (73 kg) | Jr | Dougherty High School | Albany, GA |
| G | 21 | Mark Reed | 6 ft 0 in (1.83 m) | 170 lb (77 kg) | Fr | S. Park High School | Winston-Salem, NC |
| G | 22 | Randall Ridley | 5 ft 10 in (1.78 m) | 180 lb (82 kg) | Jr | Piedmont High School | Piedmont, AL |
| G | 23 | Alvin Mumphord | 6 ft 2 in (1.88 m) | 170 lb (77 kg) | Jr | Carver High School | Birmingham, AL |
| F | 24 | Mark Cahill | 6 ft 7 in (2.01 m) | 195 lb (88 kg) | So | Stone Mountain High School | Stone Mountain, GA |
| F | 25 | Bill Sawyer | 6 ft 6 in (1.98 m) | 195 lb (88 kg) | So | Christopher Columbus High School | Coral Gables, FL |
| F | 30 | Randy Price | 6 ft 6 in (1.98 m) | 175 lb (79 kg) | Jr | Athens Bible High School | Athens, AL |
| F/C | 32 | Darrell Lockhart | 6 ft 9 in (2.06 m) | 235 lb (107 kg) | Jr | Robert E. Lee High School | Thomaston, GA |
| C | 33 | Frank Poindexter | 6 ft 6 in (1.98 m) | 195 lb (88 kg) | Jr | Evans High School | Orlando, FL |
| F/C | 34 | Charles Barkley | 6 ft 6 in (1.98 m) | 240 lb (109 kg) | Fr | Leeds High School | Birmingham, AL |
| F | 44 | Earl Hayes | 6 ft 5 in (1.96 m) | 230 lb (104 kg) | Jr | Montevallo High School | Montevallo, AL |
| F | 51 | Gary Godfrey | 6 ft 7 in (2.01 m) | 210 lb (95 kg) | Fr | North Shore High School | North Palm Beach, FL |

Head coach

- Sonny Smith

Assistant coach(es)

- Herbert Greene
- Mack McCarthy
- Herman Williams

Legend

- (C) Team captain
- (S) Suspended
- (I) Ineligible
- (W) Walk-on
- Injured
- Current redshirt

Roster

== Schedule and results ==
| Date time, TV | Rank^{#} | Opponent^{#} | Result | Record | Site (attendance) city, state |
Regular season
| Nov 30, 1981* | | Mississippi College | W 88–54 | 1–0 | Beard–Eaves–Memorial Coliseum; Auburn, Alabama |
| Dec 2, 1981* | | Stetson | W 60–59 | 2–0 | Beard–Eaves–Memorial Coliseum; Auburn, Alabama |
| Dec 5, 1981* | | Austin Peay | W 67–56 | 3–0 | Beard–Eaves–Memorial Coliseum; Auburn, Alabama |
| Dec 7, 1981* | | at Tennessee Tech | W 88–61 | 4–0 | Eblen Center; Cookeville, Tennessee |
| Dec 12, 1981 | | at Tennessee | L 79–86 | 4–1 (0–1) | Stokely Athletics Center; Knoxville, Tennessee |
| Dec 19, 1981* | | at Florida State | W 77–76 | 5–1 | Tallahassee-Leon County Civic Center; Tallahassee, Florida |
| Dec 21, 1981* | | Cal State Chico | W 104–61 | 6–1 | Beard–Eaves–Memorial Coliseum; Auburn, Alabama |
| Dec 29, 1981* | | vs. William & Mary; Iron Duke Classic | L 48–58 | 6–2 | Cameron Indoor Stadium; Durham, North Carolina |
| Dec 30, 1981* | | at Duke; Iron Duke Classic | L 71–72 | 6–3 | Cameron Indoor Stadium; Durham, North Carolina |
| Jan 2, 1982 | | Ole Miss | W 75–71 | 7–3 (1–1) | Beard–Eaves–Memorial Coliseum; Auburn, Alabama |
| Jan 6, 1982 | | at No. 3 Kentucky | L 71–83 | 7–4 (1–2) | Rupp Arena; Lexington, Kentucky |
| Jan 9, 1982 | | Florida | W 80–60 | 8–4 (2–2) | Beard–Eaves–Memorial Coliseum; Auburn, Alabama |
| Jan 13, 1982 | | at Vanderbilt | L 68–78 | 8–5 (2–3) | Memorial Gymnasium; Nashville, Tennessee |
| Jan 16, 1982 | | Mississippi State | W 62–49 | 9–5 (3–3) | Beard–Eaves–Memorial Coliseum; Auburn, Alabama |
| Jan 20, 1982 | | at LSU | L 68–69 | 9–6 (3–4) | Maravich Assembly Center; Baton Rouge, Louisiana |
| Jan 23, 1982 | | Georgia | W 82–74 | 10–6 (4–4) | Beard–Eaves–Memorial Coliseum; Auburn, Alabama |
| Jan 27, 1982 | | No. 13 Alabama | L 65–67 | 10–7 (4–5) | Beard–Eaves–Memorial Coliseum; Auburn, Alabama |
| Jan 30, 1982 | | at Ole Miss | L 57–64 | 10–8 (4–6) | Tad Smith Coliseum; Oxford, Mississippi |
| Feb 3, 1982 | | No. 9 Kentucky | W 83–81 ^{OT} | 11–8 (5–6) | Beard–Eaves–Memorial Coliseum; Auburn, Alabama |
| Feb 6, 1982 | | at Florida | L 66–69 | 11–9 (5–7) | O'Connell Center; Gainesville, Florida |
| Feb 10, 1982 | | Vanderbilt | L 60–71 | 11–10 (5–8) | Beard–Eaves–Memorial Coliseum; Auburn, Alabama |
| Feb 13, 1982 | | at Mississippi State | L 45–59 | 11–11 (5–9) | Humphrey Coliseum; Starkville, Mississippi |
| Feb 17, 1982 | | LSU | W 82–72 | 12–11 (6–9) | Beard–Eaves–Memorial Coliseum; Auburn, Alabama |
| Feb 20, 1982 | | at Georgia | L 56–57 | 12–12 (6–10) | Stegeman Coliseum; Athens, Georgia |
| Feb 24, 1982 | | at No. 17 Alabama | L 72–74 | 12–13 (6–11) | Memorial Coliseum; Tuscaloosa, Alabama |
| Feb 27, 1982 | | No. 19 Tennessee | W 56–54 | 13–13 (7–11) | Beard–Eaves–Memorial Coliseum; Auburn, Alabama |
SEC Tournament
| Mar 3, 1982 | (8) | (9) Mississippi State | W 38–36 ^{OT} | 14–13 | Rupp Arena; Lexington, Kentucky |
| Mar 4, 1982 | (8) | (1) No. 15 Kentucky | L 66–89 | 14–14 | Rupp Arena; Lexington, Kentucky |
*Non-conference game. ^{#}Rankings from AP poll. (#) Tournament seedings in parentheses. All times are in Central Time.
