= 1982–83 Alabama Crimson Tide men's basketball team =

American college basketball season

1982–83 Alabama Crimson Tide men's basketball

NCAA tournament, First Round
- Conference: Southeastern Conference
- Record: 20–12 (8–10 SEC)
- Head coach: Wimp Sanderson (3rd season)
- Home arena: Coleman Coliseum

1982–83 Southeastern Conference men's basketball standings
| | Conf. | | | | Overall |
| Team | W | | L | PCT | W | | L | PCT |
|---|---|---|---|---|---|---|---|---|
| No. 12 Kentucky | 13 | – | 5 | .722 | 23 | – | 8 | .742 |
| LSU | 10 | – | 8 | .556 | 19 | – | 13 | .594 |
| Ole Miss | 10 | – | 8 | .556 | 19 | – | 12 | .613 |
| Vanderbilt | 9 | – | 9 | .500 | 19 | – | 14 | .576 |
| Mississippi State | 9 | – | 9 | .500 | 17 | – | 12 | .586 |
| No. 18 Georgia † | 9 | – | 9 | .500 | 24 | – | 10 | .706 |
| Tennessee | 9 | – | 9 | .500 | 20 | – | 12 | .625 |
| Auburn | 8 | – | 10 | .444 | 15 | – | 13 | .536 |
| Alabama | 8 | – | 10 | .444 | 20 | – | 12 | .625 |
| Florida | 5 | – | 13 | .278 | 13 | – | 18 | .419 |
† 1983 SEC tournament winner Rankings from AP Poll

The 1982–83 Alabama Crimson Tide men's basketball team represented the University of Alabama in the 1982–83 NCAA Division I men's basketball season. The team's head coach was Wimp Sanderson, who was in his third season at Alabama. The team played their home games at Coleman Coliseum in Tuscaloosa, Alabama. They finished the season 18–12, 8–10 in SEC play, and finished in a tie for eighth place.

The key freshman signee was forward Alphonso "Buck" Johnson from Hayes High School in Birmingham, Alabama.

It was an odd year for Sanderson and the Tide. They opened the season with eight consecutive wins, including a victory over Patrick Ewing and 10th ranked Georgetown, who had reached the NCAA Finals the season before. Once conference play began, the Tide struggled, notably losing to Vanderbilt and Ole Miss each twice. Even so, the Tide still managed to post wins over nationally ranked Kentucky (#3) and top-ranked UCLA (the latter notably occurring two days after legendary football coach Bear Bryant's death).

The Tide reached the SEC tournament final and lost to Georgia. They received an at-large bid to the 1983 NCAA Division I men's basketball tournament, and lost in the first round to Lamar.

== Roster ==
1982–83 Alabama Crimson Tide men's basketball team
Players
Coaches

| Pos. | # | Name | Height | Weight | Year | Previous school | Hometown |
|---|---|---|---|---|---|---|---|
| G | 3 | Ennis Whatley | 6 ft 3 in (1.91 m) | — | So | Phillips High School | Birmingham, Alabama |
| F/C | 34 | Bobby Lee Hurt | 6 ft 9 in (2.06 m) | — | So | Butler High School | Huntsville, Alabama |
| F | 24 | Buck Johnson | 6 ft 7 in (2.01 m) | — | Fr | Hayes High School | Birmingham, Alabama |
| G | 44 | Mike Davis | 6 ft 4 in (1.93 m) | — | Sr | Fayette High School | Fayette, Alabama |
| F | 33 | Cliff Windham | 6 ft 5 in (1.96 m) | — | Sr | Livingston High School | Emelle, Alabama |
| G | 11 | Eric Richardson | 6 ft 3 in (1.91 m) | — | Jr | Carver High School | Birmingham, Alabama |
| F | | Eugene Jones | 6 ft 6 in (1.98 m) | — | Sr |
| G | | Vance Wheeler | 6 ft 4 in (1.93 m) | — | Sr |
| F | 41 | Terry Williams | 6 ft 8 in (2.03 m) | — | Jr | Elkmont High School | Elkmont, Alabama |
| G | 23 | Rex Jones | 6 ft 4 in (1.93 m) | — | So | Bradshaw High School | Florence, Alabama |
| C | 51 | Mark Farmer | 6 ft 11 in (2.11 m) | — | So | Arab High School | Arab, Alabama |
| F | 21 | Jim Farmer | 6 ft 4 in (1.93 m) | — | RS Fr | Houston Academy | Dothan, Alabama |

Head coach

- Wimp Sanderson

Assistant coach(es)

Legend

- (C) Team captain
- (S) Suspended
- (I) Ineligible
- (W) Walk-on
- Injured
- Current redshirt

== Schedule and results ==
| Date time, TV | Rank^{#} | Opponent^{#} | Result | Record | Site city, state |
Regular season
| Nov 29, 1982* | No. 12 | Middle Tennessee State | W 103–58 | 1–0 | Coleman Coliseum; Tuscaloosa, Alabama |
| Dec 4, 1982* | No. 13 | vs. Texas Tech | W 74–53 | 2–0 | |
| Dec 6, 1982* | No. 11 | SMU | W 74–56 | 3–0 | Coleman Coliseum; Tuscaloosa, Alabama |
| Dec 11, 1982* | No. 11 | at Penn State | W 74–65 | 4–0 | Rec Hall; University Park, Pennsylvania |
| Dec 18, 1982* | No. 10 | Louisiana Tech | W 88–73 | 5–0 | Coleman Coliseum; Tuscaloosa, Alabama |
| Dec 20, 1982* | No. 8 | Texas Southern | W 88–58 | 6–0 | Coleman Coliseum; Tuscaloosa, Alabama |
| Dec 28, 1982* | No. 6 | at USC; Winston Tire Classic | W 74–61 | 7–0 | L.A. Sports Arena; Los Angeles, California |
| Dec 29, 1982* | No. 6 | vs. No. 10 Georgetown; Winston Tire Classic | W 94–73 | 8–0 | L.A. Sports Arena (10,940); Los Angeles, California |
| Jan 3, 1983 | No. 5 | at Florida | L 85–89 | 8–1 (0–1) | Stephen C. O'Connell Center; Gainesville, Florida |
| Jan 5, 1983 | No. 5 | at Auburn | L 80–91 | 8–2 (0–2) | Beard-Eaves-Memorial Coliseum; Auburn, Alabama |
| Jan 8, 1983 | No. 5 | No. 3 Kentucky | W 74–67 | 9–2 (1–2) | Coleman Coliseum; Tuscaloosa, Alabama |
| Jan 11, 1983 | No. 10 | Vanderbilt | L 79–81 | 9–3 (1–3) | Coleman Coliseum; Tuscaloosa, Alabama |
| Jan 15, 1983 | No. 10 | at Georgia | L 64–67 | 9–4 (1–4) | Stegeman Coliseum; Athens, Georgia |
| Jan 18, 1983 | | at Tennessee | L 64-73 | 9-5 (1-5) | Stokely Athletic Center; Knoxville, Tennessee |
| Jan 22, 1983 | | LSU | W 75-70 | 10-5 (2-5) | Coleman Coliseum; Tuscaloosa, Alabama |
| Jan 24, 1983 | | Ole Miss | L 63-64 | 10-6 (2-6) | Coleman Coliseum; Tuscaloosa |
| Jan 28, 1983* | | at No. 1 UCLA | W 70–67 | 11–6 (2-6) | Pauley Pavilion (12,574); Los Angeles, California |
| Jan 31, 1983 | | at Mississippi St. | L 69-78 | 11-7 (2-7) | Humphrey Coliseum; Starkville, Mississippi |
| Feb 5, 1983 | | at Kentucky | L 70-76 | 11-8 (2-8) | Rupp Arena; Lexington, Kentucky |
| Feb 7, 1983 | | at Vanderbilt | L 60-61 | 11-9 (2-9) | Memorial Gymnasium; Nashville, Tennessee |
| Feb 12, 1983 | | Georgia | W 73-71 | 12-9 (3-9) | Coleman Coliseum; Tuscaloosa, Alabama |
| Feb 14, 1983 | | Tennessee | W 90-78 | 13-9 (4-9) | Coleman Coliseum; Tuscaloosa, Alabama |
| Feb 19, 1983 | | at LSU | W 71-67 | 14-9 (5-9) | Maravich Assembly Center; Baton Rouge, Louisiana |
| Feb 21, 1983 | | at Ole Miss | L 52-56 | 14-10 (5-10) | Tad Smith Coliseum; Oxford, Mississippi |
| Feb 26, 1983 | | Mississippi State | W 83-58 | 15-10 (6-10) | Coleman, Coliseum; Tuscaloosa, Alabama |
| Mar 3, 1983 | | Florida | W 106-99 | 16-10 (7-10) | Coleman Coliseum; Tuscaloosa, Alabama |
| Mar 6, 1983 | | Auburn | W 86–78 | 17–10 (8–10) | Coleman Coliseum; Tuscaloosa, Alabama |
SEC Tournament
| Mar 10, 1983* | | vs. Auburn; First Round | W 62–61 | 18–10 | Birmingham-Jefferson Civic Center; Birmingham, Alabama |
| Mar 11, 1983* | | vs. No. 10 Kentucky; Quarterfinals | W 69–64 | 19–10 | Birmingham-Jefferson Civic Center; Birmingham, Alabama |
| Mar 12, 1983* | | vs. Mississippi State; Semifinals | W 51–50 | 20–10 | Birmingham-Jefferson Civic Center; Birmingham, Alabama |
| Mar 13, 1983* | | vs. Georgia; Championship game | L 71–86 | 20–11 | Birmingham-Jefferson Civic Center; Birmingham, Alabama |
NCAA Tournament
| Mar 17, 1983* | (6 MW) | vs. (11 MW) Lamar | L 50–73 | 20–12 | The Summit; Houston, Texas |
*Non-conference game. ^{#}Rankings from AP poll. (#) Tournament seedings in parentheses.
