= Cecil Leonard =

American football player (1946–2020)

No. 28, 32
- Position: Defensive back

Personal information
- Born: July 20, 1946; Sylacauga, Alabama, U.S.
- Died: August 5, 2020 (aged 74); Statesboro, Georgia, U.S.
- Listed height: 5 ft 11 in (1.80 m)
- Listed weight: 160 lb (73 kg)

Career information
- High school: Sylacauga (AL) East Highland
- College: Tuskegee (1965–1968)
- NFL draft: 1969: 8th round, 208th overall pick

Career history

Playing
- New York Jets (1969–1970); Birmingham Americans (1974)

Coaching
- A. H. Parker HS (AL) (1973–1974); Hayes HS (AL) (1975–1979); A. H. Parker HS (AL) (1980–1992); Miles (1994–2000)

Career NFL/AFL statistics
- Fumble recoveries: 1
- Kick return yards: 155
- Stats at Pro Football Reference

Head coaching record
- Regular season: 154–124–1 (.554)
- Postseason: 9–9 (.500)
- Career: 163–133–1 (.551)

Cecil Leonard (July 20, 1946 – August 5, 2020) was an American professional football player who was a defensive back for two seasons with the New York Jets of the American Football League (AFL) and National Football League (NFL). He was drafted by the Jets in the eighth round of the 1969 NFL/AFL draft. He played college football at Tuskegee University and attended East Highland High School in Sylacauga, Alabama. Leonard was also a member of the Birmingham Americans of the World Football League (WFL).

== Professional career ==
Leonard was selected by the New York Jets of the AFL with the 208th pick in the 1969 AFL draft. He played for the Jets during the 1969 and 1970 seasons. He played for the Birmingham Americans of the WFL during the 1974 season.

== Coaching career ==
Leonard was head coach of the A. H. Parker High School Thundering Herd from 1973 to 1974, compiling a record of 9–10. He was head coach of the Carol W. Hayes High School Pacesetters from 1975 to 1979, helping the team advance to the state playoffs in 1976. He returned as head coach of the A. H. Parker High School Thundering Herd from 1980 to 1992, reaching the playoffs six times. Leonard was head coach of the Miles Golden Bears of Miles College from 1994 to 2000, compiling a record of 27–41–1.

== Head coaching record ==
=== College ===
Year	Team	Overall	Conference	Standing	Bowl/playoffs
Miles Golden Bears (Southern Intercollegiate Athletic Conference) (1994–2000)
1994	Miles	2–6–1	2–5	T–6th	
1995	Miles	4–6	4–4	T–5th	
1996	Miles	6–4	3–3	T–2nd	
1997	Miles	4–6	3–3	T–5th	
1998	Miles	4–6	2–4	T–6th	
1999	Miles	3–7	2–4	T–5th	
2000	Miles	4–6	2–5	T–6th	
Miles:		27–41–1	18–29		
Total:		27–41–1			
