= 1982–83 Auburn Tigers men's basketball team =

American college basketball season

1982–83 Auburn Tigers men's basketball

Utah–Hilton Classic champions
- Conference: Southeastern Conference
- Record: 15–13 (8–10 SEC)
- Head coach: Sonny Smith (5th season)
- Assistant coaches: Roger Banks; Mack McCarthy; Tevester Anderson
- Captains: Darrell Lockhart; Alvin Mumphord
- Home arena: Memorial Coliseum

1982–83 Southeastern Conference men's basketball standings
	Conf.				Overall
Team	W		L	PCT	W		L	PCT
No. 12 Kentucky	13	–	5	.722	23	–	8	.742
LSU	10	–	8	.556	19	–	13	.594
Ole Miss	10	–	8	.556	19	–	12	.613
Vanderbilt	9	–	9	.500	19	–	14	.576
Mississippi State	9	–	9	.500	17	–	12	.586
No. 18 Georgia †	9	–	9	.500	24	–	10	.706
Tennessee	9	–	9	.500	20	–	12	.625
Auburn	8	–	10	.444	15	–	13	.536
Alabama	8	–	10	.444	20	–	12	.625
Florida	5	–	13	.278	13	–	18	.419
† 1983 SEC tournament winner Rankings from AP Poll

The 1982–83 Auburn Tigers men's basketball team represented Auburn University in the 1982–83 college basketball season. The team's head coach was Sonny Smith, who was in his fifth season at Auburn. The team played their home games at Memorial Coliseum in Auburn, Alabama.

Auburn's lone signee was Chuck Person, a freshman from Brantley High School in Brantley, Alabama.

The team finished the season 15–13, 8–10 in SEC play. The Tigers lost in the first round of the 1983 SEC tournament to Alabama.

== Roster ==
1982–83 Auburn Tigers men's basketball team
Players
Coaches

Pos.	#	Name	Height	Weight	Year	Previous school	Hometown
F/C	34	Charles Barkley	6 ft 6 in (1.98 m)	—	So	Leeds High School	Birmingham, AL
F	45	Chuck Person	6 ft 8 in (2.03 m)	—	Fr	Brantley High School	Brantley, AL
F	11	Greg Turner	6 ft 7 in (2.01 m)	—	Jr	Tuskegee High School	Tuskegee, Alabama
F	00	Paul Daniels	6 ft 0 in (1.83 m)	—	Jr	Warner Christian	Ormond Beach, Florida
F	21	Mark Cahill	6 ft 7 in (2.01 m)	—	Jr	Stone Mountain High School	Stone Mountain, Georgia
G	12	Odell Mostellar	6 ft 3 in (1.91 m)	—	Sr	Chattooga High School	Summerville, Georgia
G	3	Byron Henson	6 ft 3 in (1.91 m)	—	Sr	Benedictine High School	Richmond, VA
G	23	Alvin Mumphord	6 ft 4 in (1.93 m)	—	Sr	Carver High School	Birmingham, Alabama
G	24	Donnie Butcher	6 ft 2 in (1.88 m)	—	Fr	Mullins High School	Pikeville, Kentucky
C	32	Darrell Lockhart	6 ft 7 in (2.01 m)	—	Sr	Robert E. Lee High School	Thomaston, Georgia
F	44	Earl Hayes	6 ft 5 in (1.96 m)	—		Montevallo High School	Montevallo, Alabama

Head coach

- Sonny Smith (Milligan)

Assistant coach(es)

Legend

- (C) Team captain
- (S) Suspended
- (I) Ineligible
- (W) Walk-on
- Injured
- Current redshirt

== Schedule and results ==
Date time, TV	Rank^{#}	Opponent^{#}	Result	Record	Site city, state
Regular Season
November 26, 1982*		at UAB	W 63–61	1–0	BJCC Coliseum; Birmingham, Alabama
November 29, 1982*		Mercer	W 85–76	2–0	Beard–Eaves–Memorial Coliseum; Auburn, Alabama
December 1, 1982*		Florida State	W 78–68	3–0	Memorial Coliseum; Auburn, Alabama
December 4, 1982*		Tennessee Tech	W 74–65	4–0	Memorial Coliseum; Auburn, Alabama
December 6, 1982*		at Stetson	L 58–59	4–1	Edmunds Center; DeLand, Florida
December 8, 1982*		at No. 9 Houston	L 65–77	4–2	Hofheinz Pavilion; Houston, Texas
December 28, 1982*		Cal State Fullerton; Utah-Hilton Classic	W 69–60	5–2	Jon M. Huntsman Center; Salt Lake City, Utah
December 29, 1982*		at Utah; Utah-Hilton Classic	W 71–62	6–2	Jon M. Huntsman Center; Salt Lake City, Utah
January 3, 1983		Mississippi State	W 77–66	7–2 (1–0)	Memorial Coliseum; Auburn, Alabama
January 5, 1983		No. 5 Alabama	W 91–80	8–2 (2–0)	Memorial Coliseum; Auburn, Alabama
January 8, 1983		at Florida	L 75–92	8–3 (2–1)	O'Connell Center; Gainesville, Florida
January 15, 1983		at No. 6 Kentucky	W 75–67	9–3 (2–2)	Rupp Arena; Lexington, Kentucky
January 17, 1983		at Vanderbilt	L 62–64	9–4 (2–3)	Memorial Gymnasium; Nashville, Tennessee
January 22, 1983		Georgia	W 66–64	10–4 (3–3)	Memorial Coliseum; Auburn, Alabama
January 24, 1983		Tennessee	L 77–80	10–5 (3–4)	Memorial Coliseum; Auburn, Alabama
January 29, 1983		at LSU	W 64–62	11–5 (4–4)	Maravich Assembly Center; Baton Rouge, Louisiana
January 31, 1983		at Ole Miss	L 48–61	11–6 (4–5)	Tad Smith Coliseum; Oxford, Mississippi
February 5, 1983		Florida	W 62–54	12–6 (5–5)	Memorial Coliseum; Tuscaloosa, Alabama
February 12, 1983		No. 13 Kentucky	L 69–71	12–7 (5–6)	Memorial Coliseum; Auburn, Alabama
February 14, 1983		Vanderbilt	W 72–71	13–7 (6–6)	Memorial Coliseum; Auburn, Alabama
February 19, 1983		at Georgia	L 60–67	13–8 (6–7)	Stegeman Coliseum; Athens, Georgia
February 22, 1983		at Tennessee	L 74–82	13–9 (6–8)	Stokely Center; Knoxville, Tennessee
February 26, 1983		LSU	L 61–87	13–10 (6–9)	Memorial Coliseum; Auburn, Alabama
March 1, 1983		Ole Miss	W 82–59	14–10 (7–9)	Memorial Coliseum; Auburn, Alabama
March 3, 1983		at Mississippi State	L 53–69	14–11 (7–10)	Humphrey Coliseum; Starkville, Mississippi
March 6, 1983		at Alabama	L 78–86	14–12 (7–11)	Memorial Coliseum; Tuscaloosa, Alabama
SEC Tournament
March 10, 1983	(8)	(9) Alabama; First Round	L 61–62	14–13	Birmingham-Jefferson Civic Center; Birmingham, Alabama
*Non-conference game. ^{#}Rankings from AP poll. (#) Tournament seedings in parentheses. SE=Southeast.
