= 1981–82 Kentucky Wildcats men's basketball team =

American college basketball season

1981–82 Kentucky Wildcats men's basketball

SEC Regular Season Co-Champions

NCAA tournament, First round
- Conference: Southeastern Conference

Ranking
- Coaches: No. 14
- AP: No. 15
- Record: 22–8 (13–5 SEC)
- Head coach: Joe B. Hall (10th season)
- Home arena: Rupp Arena

1981–82 Southeastern Conference men's basketball standings
	Conf.				Overall
Team	W		L	PCT	W		L	PCT
No. 15 Kentucky	13	–	5	.722	22	–	8	.733
Tennessee	13	–	5	.722	20	–	10	.667
No. 13 Alabama †	12	–	6	.667	24	–	7	.774
Ole Miss	11	–	7	.611	18	–	12	.600
LSU	11	–	7	.611	14	–	14	.500
Georgia	10	–	8	.556	19	–	12	.613
Vanderbilt	7	–	11	.389	15	–	13	.536
Auburn	7	–	11	.389	14	–	14	.500
Mississippi State	4	–	14	.222	8	–	19	.296
Florida	2	–	16	.111	5	–	22	.185
† 1982 SEC tournament winner Rankings from AP Poll

The 1981–82 Kentucky Wildcats men's basketball team represented University of Kentucky in the 1981–82 NCAA Division I men's basketball season. The head coach was Joe B. Hall and the team finished the season with an overall record of 22–8. In the 1982 NCAA Tournament the Kentucky Wildcats were invited to participate as a #6 seed. But they were upset by Cinderella team Middle Tennessee St. 50–44.

== Roster ==
1981–82 Kentucky Wildcats men's basketball team
Players
Coaches

Pos.	#	Name	Height	Weight	Year	Hometown
G	5	Mike Ballenger	6 ft 3 in (1.91 m)	185 lb (84 kg)	Fr	Jasper, Indiana
G	10	Dirk Minniefield	6 ft 3 in (1.91 m)	180 lb (82 kg)	Jr	Lexington, Kentucky
G	11	Dicky Beal	5 ft 11 in (1.8 m)	170 lb (77 kg)	So	Covington, Kentucky
G	12	Bo Lanter	6 ft 1 in (1.85 m)	175 lb (79 kg)	Sr	Versailles, Kentucky
G	20	Jim Master	6 ft 5 in (1.96 m)	180 lb (82 kg)	So	Fort Wayne, Indiana
F	24	Bret Bearup (injured) (redshirt)	6 ft 9 in (2.06 m)	230 lb (104 kg)	Fr	Centerport, New York
F/C	31	Sam Bowie (injured) (redshirt)	7 ft 1 in (2.16 m)	235 lb (107 kg)	So	Lebanon, Pennsylvania
G/F	32	Derrick Hord	6 ft 6 in (1.98 m)	215 lb (98 kg)	Jr	Bristol, Tennessee
F	34	Chuck Verderber	6 ft 6 in (1.98 m)	220 lb (100 kg)	Sr	Lincoln, Illinois
G/F	40	Troy McKinley	6 ft 6 in (1.98 m)	195 lb (88 kg)	Fr	Independence, Kentucky
F	44	Charles Hurt	6 ft 6 in (1.98 m)	215 lb (98 kg)	Jr	Shelbyville, Kentucky
C	54	Melvin Turpin	6 ft 11 in (2.11 m)	240 lb (109 kg)	So	Lexington, Kentucky

Head coach

- Joe B. Hall (Kentucky)

Assistant coach(es)

Legend

- (C) Team captain
- (S) Suspended
- (I) Ineligible
- (W) Walk-on
- Injured
- Current redshirt

== Schedule and results ==
Date time, TV	Rank^{#}	Opponent^{#}	Result	Record	Site city, state
Regular Season
November 28, 1981*	No. 3	Akron	W 83–64	1–0	Rupp Arena; Lexington, Kentucky
December 5, 1981*	No. 2	Ohio State	W 78–62	2–0	St. John Arena; Columbus, Ohio
December 8, 1981*	No. 2	No. 10 Indiana; Rivalry	W 85–69	3–0	Rupp Arena; Lexington, Kentucky
December 12, 1981*	No. 2	Kansas	W 77–74 ^{OT}	4–0	Allen Fieldhouse; Lawrence, Kansas
December 18, 1981*	No. 2	Jacksonville	W 107–91	5–0	Rupp Arena; Lexington, Kentucky
December 19, 1981*	No. 2	Seton Hall	W 94–78	6–0	Rupp Arena; Lexington, Kentucky
December 26, 1981*; NBC	No. 2	No. 1 North Carolina	L 69–82	6–1	Brendan Byrne Arena; East Rutherford, New Jersey
December 29, 1981*	No. 4	Notre Dame	W 34–28 ^{OT}	7–1	Freedom Hall; Louisville, Kentucky
January 2, 1982	No. 4	Georgia	W 68–66	8–1 (1–0)	Stegeman Coliseum; Athens, Georgia
January 6, 1982	No. 3	Auburn	W 83–71	9–1 (2–0)	Rupp Arena; Lexington, Kentucky
January 9, 1982	No. 3	Tennessee	L 66–70	9–2 (2–1)	Stokely Center; Knoxville, Tennessee
January 13, 1982	No. 6	Ole Miss	L 65–67	9–3 (2–2)	Tad Smith Coliseum; Oxford, Mississippi
January 16, 1982	No. 6	No. 13 Alabama	W 86–69	10–3 (3–2)	Rupp Arena; Lexington, Kentucky
January 20, 1982	No. 9	Florida	W 91–76	11–3 (4–2)	O'Connell Center; Gainesville, Florida
January 23, 1982	No. 9	Vanderbilt	W 67–58	12–3 (5–2)	Rupp Arena; Lexington, Kentucky
January 25, 1982	No. 9	LSU	W 76–65	13–3 (6–2)	Rupp Arena; Lexington, Kentucky
January 27, 1982	No. 7	Mississippi State	L 51–56	13–4 (6–3)	Humphrey Coliseum; Starkville, Mississippi
January 30, 1982	No. 7	Georgia	W 82–73	14–4 (7–3)	Rupp Arena; Lexington, Kentucky
February 3, 1982	No. 9	Auburn	L 81–83 ^{OT}	14–5 (8–3)	Memorial Coliseum; Auburn, Alabama
February 6, 1982	No. 9	No. 16 Tennessee	W 77–67	15–5 (9–3)	Rupp Arena; Lexington, Kentucky
February 10, 1982	No. 12	Ole Miss	W 56–49	16–5 (10–3)	Rupp Arena; Lexington, Kentucky
February 13, 1982	No. 12	No. 10 Alabama	W 82–72	17–5 (11–3)	Memorial Coliseum; Tuscaloosa, Alabama
February 17, 1982	No. 10	Florida	W 84–78	18–5 (12–3)	Rupp Arena; Lexington, Kentucky
February 20, 1982	No. 10	Vanderbilt	W 73–69	19–5 (13–3)	Memorial Gymnasium; Nashville, Tennessee
February 24, 1982	No. 7	Mississippi State	W 71–54	20–5 (14–3)	Rupp Arena; Lexington, Kentucky
February 27, 1982	No. 7	LSU	L 78–94	20–6 (14–4)	Maravich Assembly Center; Baton Rouge, Louisiana
SEC Tournament
March 4, 1982; TVS	(1) No. 15	(8) Auburn; Second Round	W 89–66	21–6	Rupp Arena; Lexington, Kentucky
March 5, 1982; TVS	(1) No. 15	(4) Ole Miss; Semifinals	W 62–58	22–6	Rupp Arena; Lexington, Kentucky
March 6, 1982; TVS	(1) No. 15	(3) No. 18 Alabama; SEC Championship	L 46–48	22–7	Rupp Arena; Lexington, Kentucky
NCAA Tournament
March 11, 1982	(6 ME) No. 15	(11 ME) Middle Tennessee; Second round	L 44–50	22–8	Memorial Gymnasium; Nashville, Tennessee
*Non-conference game. ^{#}Rankings from AP poll. (#) Tournament seedings in parentheses. SE=Southeast.
