= 1982–83 Kentucky Wildcats men's basketball team =

1982–83 season of University of Kentucky men's basketball team

1982–83 Kentucky Wildcats men's basketball

SEC regular season champions

NCAA tournament, Elite Eight
- Conference: Southeastern Conference

Ranking
- Coaches: No. 10
- AP: No. 12
- Record: 23–8 (13–5 SEC)
- Head coach: Joe B. Hall (11th season)
- Assistant coach: Leonard Hamilton
- Home arena: Rupp Arena

1982–83 Southeastern Conference men's basketball standings
| | Conf. | | | | Overall |
| Team | W | | L | PCT | W | | L | PCT |
|---|---|---|---|---|---|---|---|---|
| No. 12 Kentucky | 13 | – | 5 | .722 | 23 | – | 8 | .742 |
| LSU | 10 | – | 8 | .556 | 19 | – | 13 | .594 |
| Ole Miss | 10 | – | 8 | .556 | 19 | – | 12 | .613 |
| Vanderbilt | 9 | – | 9 | .500 | 19 | – | 14 | .576 |
| Mississippi State | 9 | – | 9 | .500 | 17 | – | 12 | .586 |
| No. 18 Georgia † | 9 | – | 9 | .500 | 24 | – | 10 | .706 |
| Tennessee | 9 | – | 9 | .500 | 20 | – | 12 | .625 |
| Auburn | 8 | – | 10 | .444 | 15 | – | 13 | .536 |
| Alabama | 8 | – | 10 | .444 | 20 | – | 12 | .625 |
| Florida | 5 | – | 13 | .278 | 13 | – | 18 | .419 |
† 1983 SEC tournament winner Rankings from AP Poll

The 1982–83 Kentucky Wildcats men's basketball team represented University of Kentucky in the 1982–83 NCAA Division I men's basketball season. The head coach was Joe B. Hall and the team finished the season with an overall record of 23–8. Kentucky was invited to the 1983 NCAA Tournament as a #3 seed. After wins vs Ohio and Indiana the Wildcats advanced to the Elite 8 vs their arch rivals the Louisville Cardinals. Kentucky would go on to lose 80–68 and for the 5th straight season fail to reach the Final Four.

== Roster ==
1982–83 Kentucky Wildcats men's basketball team
Players
Coaches

| Pos. | # | Name | Height | Weight | Year | Previous school | Hometown |
|---|---|---|---|---|---|---|---|
| G | 10 | Dirk Minniefield | 6 ft 3 in (1.91 m) | 180 lb (82 kg) | Sr | Lafayette | Lexington, Kentucky |
| G | 20 | Jim Master | 6 ft 5 in (1.96 m) | 180 lb (82 kg) | Jr | Paul Harding | Fort Wayne, Indiana |
| G | 23 | Roger Harden | 6 ft 1 in (1.85 m) | 165 lb (75 kg) | Fr | | Valparaiso, Indiana |
| F | 24 | Bret Bearup | 6 ft 9 in (2.06 m) | 230 lb (104 kg) | So | | Centerport, New York |
| F/C | 31 | Sam Bowie (redshirt) | 7 ft 1 in (2.16 m) | 235 lb (107 kg) | Sr | Lebanon | Lebanon, Pennsylvania |
| F/C | 33 | Tom Heitz | 6 ft 9 in (2.06 m) | 220 lb (100 kg) | Jr | | Hamilton, Indiana |
| F | 34 | Kenny Walker | 6 ft 8 in (2.03 m) | 190 lb (86 kg) | Fr | Crawford County | Roberta, Georgia |
| C | 54 | Melvin Turpin | 6 ft 11 in (2.11 m) | 235 lb (107 kg) | Jr | Bryan Station | Lexington, Kentucky |

Head coach

- Joe B. Hall

Assistant coach(es)

Legend

- (C) Team captain
- (S) Suspended
- (I) Ineligible
- (W) Walk-on
- Injured
- Current redshirt

== Schedule and results ==
| Date time, TV | Rank^{#} | Opponent^{#} | Result | Record | Site city, state |
Regular Season
| Nov 27, 1982* | No. 4 | Butler | W 90–53 | 1–0 | Rupp Arena; Lexington, Kentucky |
| Dec 1, 1982* | No. 3 | at Notre Dame | W 58–45 | 2–0 | Joyce Center; Notre Dame, Indiana |
| Dec 4, 1982* | No. 3 | No. 4 Villanova | W 93–79 | 3–0 | Rupp Arena; Lexington, Kentucky |
| Dec 7, 1982* | No. 2 | Detroit | W 83–46 | 4–0 | Rupp Arena; Lexington, Kentucky |
| Dec 11, 1982* | No. 2 | Illinois | W 76–57 | 5–0 | Rupp Arena (23,872); Lexington, Kentucky |
| Dec 17, 1982* | No. 2 | Duquesne | W 55–42 | 6–0 | Rupp Arena; Lexington, Kentucky |
| Dec 18, 1982* | No. 2 | Tulane | W 80–61 | 7–0 | Rupp Arena; Lexington, Kentucky |
| Dec 22, 1982* | No. 2 | at No. 5 Indiana; Rivalry | L 59–62 | 7–1 | Assembly Hall; Bloomington, Indiana |
| Dec 29, 1982* | No. 3 | vs. Kansas | W 83–62 | 8–1 | Freedom Hall; Louisville, Kentucky |
| Jan 3, 1983 | No. 3 | Ole Miss | W 72–60 | 9–1 (1–0) | Rupp Arena; Lexington, Kentucky |
| Jan 5, 1983; TVS | No. 3 | LSU | W 52–50 | 10–1 (2–0) | Rupp Arena; Lexington, Kentucky |
| Jan 8, 1983 | No. 3 | at No. 5 Alabama | L 67–74 | 10–2 (2–1) | Coleman Coliseum; Tuscaloosa, Alabama |
| Jan 10, 1983 | No. 3 | at Mississippi State | W 59–53 ^{OT} | 11–2 (3–1) | Humphrey Coliseum; Starkville, Mississippi |
| Jan 15, 1983 | No. 6 | Auburn | L 67–75 | 11–3 (3–2) | Rupp Arena; Lexington, Kentucky |
| Jan 17, 1983 | No. 11 | Florida | W 70–63 | 12–3 (4–2) | Rupp Arena; Lexington, Kentucky |
| Jan 22, 1983 | No. 11 | at Vanderbilt | W 82–77 ^{OT} | 13–3 (5–2) | Memorial Gymnasium; Nashville, Tennessee |
| Jan 29, 1983 | No. 10 | at Georgia | L 63–70 | 13–4 (5–3) | Stegeman Coliseum; Athens, Georgia |
| Jan 31, 1983 | No. 15 | at Tennessee | L 63–65 | 13–5 (5–4) | Stokely Athletic Center; Knoxville, Tennessee |
| Feb 5, 1983 | No. 15 | Alabama | W 76–70 | 14–5 (6–4) | Rupp Arena; Lexington, Kentucky |
| Feb 8, 1983; TVS | No. 13 | Mississippi State | W 88–67 | 15–5 (7–4) | Rupp Arena; Lexington, Kentucky |
| Feb 12, 1983 | No. 13 | at Auburn | W 71–69 | 16–5 (8–4) | Beard-Eaves-Memorial Coliseum; Auburn, Alabama |
| Feb 14, 1983 | No. 11 | at Florida | W 73–61 | 17–5 (9–4) | Stephen C. O'Connell Center; Gainesville, Florida |
| Feb 19, 1983 | No. 11 | Vanderbilt | W 82–63 | 18–5 (10–4) | Rupp Arena; Lexington, Kentucky |
| Feb 26, 1983 | No. 10 | Georgia | W 81–72 | 19–5 (11–4) | Rupp Arena; Lexington, Kentucky |
| Feb 27, 1983; NBC | No. 10 | No. 20 Tennessee | W 69–61 | 20–5 (12–4) | Rupp Arena; Lexington, Kentucky |
| Mar 3, 1983; TVS | No. 7 | at Ole Miss | W 61–58 | 21–5 (13–4) | Tad Smith Coliseum; Oxford, Mississippi |
| Mar 5, 1983 | No. 7 | at LSU | L 60–74 | 21–6 (13–5) | Maravich Assembly Center; Baton Rouge, Louisiana |
SEC Tournament
| Mar 11, 1983*; TVS | (1) No. 10 | vs. (9) Alabama; Quarterfinals | L 64–69 | 21–7 | Birmingham-Jefferson Civic Center; Birmingham, Alabama |
NCAA Tournament
| Mar 19, 1983* | (3 ME) No. 12 | vs. (11 ME) Ohio; Second round | W 57–40 | 22–7 | Sun Dome; Tampa, Florida |
| Mar 24, 1983*; CBS | (3 ME) No. 12 | vs. (2 ME) No. 5 Indiana; Mideast Regional semifinal – Sweet Sixteen | W 64–59 | 23–7 | Stokely Center; Knoxville, Tennessee |
| Mar 26, 1983*; CBS | (3 ME) No. 12 | vs. (1 ME) No. 2 Louisville; Mideast Regional Final – Elite Eight | L 68–80 ^{OT} | 23–8 | Stokely Athletic Center; Knoxville, Tennessee |
*Non-conference game. ^{#}Rankings from AP Poll. (#) Tournament seedings in parentheses. ME=Mideast.

== Rankings ==
Ranking movements Legend: ██ Increase in ranking ██ Decrease in ranking
| | Week | | | | | | | | | | | | | | | | |
| Poll | Pre | 1 | 2 | 3 | 4 | 5 | 6 | 7 | 8 | 9 | 10 | 11 | 12 | 13 | 14 | 15 | Final |
|---|---|---|---|---|---|---|---|---|---|---|---|---|---|---|---|---|---|
| AP | 4 | 3 | 2 | 2 | 2 | 3 | 3 | 6 | 11 | 10 | 15 | 13 | 11 | 10 | 7 | 10 | 12 |
| Coaches | 4 | 4 | 2 | 2 | 2 | 4 | 3 | 6 | 13 | 10 | 15 | 12 | 12 | 10 | 6 | 10 | 10 |
