= Halo, Kentucky =

Unincorporated community in Kentucky, United States

- Unincorporated community
- Location within the state of Kentucky Halo (the United States)
- Coordinates: 37°18′56″N 82°44′22″W
- Country: United States
- State: Kentucky
- County: Floyd
- Elevation: 1,188 ft (362 m)
- Time zone: UTC-5 (Eastern (EST))
  - Summer (DST): UTC-4 (EDT)
- ZIP codes: 41606
- GNIS feature ID: 508165

Halo is an unincorporated community located in Floyd County, Kentucky, United States.

The origin of the name "Halo" is obscure.

It is home to Monroe Jones, a guard during the 1982–83 Georgia Bulldogs basketball team.
