= Charles Claxton (basketball) =

American basketball player

Personal information
- Born: December 13, 1970 (age 55) Saint Thomas, U.S. Virgin Islands
- Listed height: 7 ft 0 in (2.13 m)
- Listed weight: 265 lb (120 kg)

Career information
- High school: Miami Carol City (Miami, Florida)
- College: Georgia (1991–1995)
- NBA draft: 1994: 2nd round, 50th overall pick
- Drafted by: Phoenix Suns
- Playing career: 1995–2000
- Position: Center
- Number: 51

Career history
- 1995: Boston Celtics
- 1996: Criollos de Caguas
- 1996–1997: Nobiles Włocławek
- 1997–1998: Atletas Kaunas
- 1999–2000: Brighton Bears
- Stats at NBA.com
- Stats at Basketball Reference

Charles Claxton Jr. (born December 13, 1970) is an American former professional basketball player.

Born in Saint Thomas, U.S. Virgin Islands, he attended Miami Carol City High School in Miami, Florida, and played college basketball for the Georgia Bulldogs.

He was selected by the Phoenix Suns in the second round (50th pick overall) of the 1994 NBA draft.

He played for the Boston Celtics (1995–96) in the National Basketball Association (NBA) for three games. He also was under contract with the Cleveland Cavaliers (October 1995) and Utah Jazz (October 1996), but did not play in any regular-season NBA games for those teams.

His son Nic Claxton is a professional basketball player in the NBA, and his other son, Chase Claxton, plays Division I college basketball for Winthrop University.
