= Hayden Riley =

American basketball coach (1921–1995)

Biographical details
- Born: September 14, 1921; Guin, Alabama, U.S.
- Died: April 24, 1995 (aged 73); Tuscaloosa, Alabama, U.S.

Playing career
- 1941–1942: Howard (AL) (3 sports)
- 1946–1948: Alabama (basketball, baseball)
- Position: Guard (basketball)

Coaching career (HC unless noted)

Basketball
- 1948–1958: Coffee HS (AL)
- 1958–1960: Alabama (assistant)
- 1960–1968: Alabama

Baseball
- 1970–1979: Alabama

Football
- 1958–1969: Alabama (assistant)

Administrative career (AD unless noted)
- 1982–1984: GSC (commissioner)

Head coaching record
- Overall: 102–104 (basketball); 224–163–1 (baseball)

Loyd Hayden Riley (September 14, 1921 – April 24, 1995) was an American college basketball coach. He was the head coach of the Alabama Crimson Tide for eight seasons during the 1960s, and the Tide's head baseball coach for ten seasons in the 1970s. Riley was also a recruiting coordinator for football at Alabama under Paul "Bear" Bryant.

== College and military ==
Born and raised in Guin, Alabama, Riley was a four-sport athlete in high school and played football, basketball, and baseball at Howard College (now Samford University). He entered the U.S. Navy in 1942 and was stationed at NAS Pensacola in the nearby Florida panhandle as a physical trainer. Following his discharge from the military, he returned to college at the University of Alabama in Tuscaloosa, where he lettered in basketball and baseball. He earned a bachelor's degree in physical education in August 1948 and earned a master's degree in 1953.

== Coaching ==
Just days after earning his degree, Riley was the head coach of baseball and basketball at Coffee High School in Florence. He stayed for a decade, and his basketball team won the state championship in 1951, with high finishes in other years. One of his players at Coffee was Wimp Sanderson, a future assistant under Riley at Alabama and later the Tide's head coach. Riley was also the head football coach at CHS for three seasons, beginning in 1955. He moved to the University of Alabama in 1958 as a football assistant to Bear Bryant (also Alabama's athletic director) Hayden was one of the Best recruiters and evaluation of talent. He had an unbelievable talent of remembering anybody's name and from his stent in the Navy knew people all over the nation which helped in the recruiting and assistant basketball coach under Eugene Lambert. When Lambert left in 1960, Riley was promoted to head basketball coach. After eight seasons, Riley suffered his first losing season and resigned in 1968, and continued as an assistant athletic director. In 1970, he succeeded Joe Sewell as head baseball coach for ten seasons and stepped down for health reasons in 1979.

Riley served in the athletic department at Alabama until 1982, then became commissioner of the Gulf South Conference from 1982 for two years. He suffered a stroke in 1987 and began using a wheelchair, and lived at the VA hospital in Tuscaloosa. Riley died of a heart attack in 1995 at age 73, and was buried in Tuscaloosa.

A city park in his hometown of Guin is named for him.

== Personal ==
Riley was married to the former Lauranne Kudrop of Greenville and they had three children, two sons and a daughter. Riley had five sisters and was the older brother of football coach Bud Riley (1925–2012), who was the father of Mike Riley, the former head football coach at Oregon State and Nebraska. Nephew Mike (b.1953) played football at Alabama as a reserve defensive back in the early 1970s while Hayden was the head baseball coach. Another nephew, Major Ogilvie, was a running back in the Tide's wishbone offense from 1977 through 1980 and won two national championships. Ogilvie is the son of Riley's sister Peggy.

== Career record ==
=== Basketball ===
Record table
Season	Team	Overall	Conference	Standing	Postseason
Alabama Crimson Tide (Southeastern Conference) (1960–1968)
1960–61	Alabama	7–18	5–9	9th	
1961–62	Alabama	11–15	6–8	6th	
1962–63	Alabama	14–11	7–7	6th	
1963–64	Alabama	14–12	7–7	7th	
1964–65	Alabama	17–9	9–7	6th	
1965–66	Alabama	16–10	9–7	5th	
1966–67	Alabama	13–13	6–12	8th	
1967–68	Alabama	10–16	3–15	10th	
Alabama:		102–104	52–69		
Total:		102–104			
National champion Postseason invitational champion Conference regular season champion Conference regular season and conference tournament champion Division regular season champion Division regular season and conference tournament champion Conference tournament champion

=== Baseball ===
Record table
Season	Team	Overall	Conference	Standing	Postseason
Alabama Crimson Tide (Southeastern Conference) (1970–1979)
1970	Alabama	10–22	5–11	4th (West)	
1971	Alabama	21–14–1	6–12	4th (West)	
1972	Alabama	22–14	7–11	2nd (West)	
1973	Alabama	22–14	12–4	1st (West)	
1974	Alabama	37–16	10–5	1st (West)	
1975	Alabama	34–32	9–13	3rd (West)	
1976	Alabama	25–18	10–11	4th (West)	
1977	Alabama	27–18	10–9	4th (West)	
1978	Alabama	23–20	10–11	4th (West)	
1979	Alabama	18–27	4–17	5th (West)	
Alabama:		236–206–1 (.534)	83–104 (.444)		
Total:		236–206–1 (.534)			
National champion Postseason invitational champion Conference regular season champion Conference regular season and conference tournament champion Division regular season champion Division regular season and conference tournament champion Conference tournament champion
