= Terry Fair (basketball) =

American-Israeli basketball player (1960–2020)

Terry Fair טרי פייר
Personal information
- Born: June 25, 1960 Macon, Georgia, U.S.
- Died: January 30, 2020 (aged 59) Macon, Georgia, U.S.
- Listed height: 6 ft 8 in (2.03 m)
- Listed weight: 215 lb (98 kg)

Career information
- High school: Southwest Macon (Macon, Georgia)
- College: Georgia (1979–1983)
- NBA draft: 1983: 4th round, 72nd overall pick
- Drafted by: Indiana Pacers
- Playing career: 1983–1996
- Position: Power forward / center

Career history
- 1985–1988: Elitzur Netanya
- 1989–1990: Maccabi Kiryat Motzkin
- 1990–1991: Hapoel Holon
- 1991–1992: A.S. Ramat Hasharon
- 1992–1993: Hapoel Tel Aviv
- 1993–1995: Maccabi Tel Aviv
- 1995–1996: Maccabi Jerusalem

Career highlights
- 2× Israeli League champion (1994, 1995); 2× Israeli State Cup winner (1993, 1994); Third-team All-SEC (1983); Third-team Parade All-American (1979); McDonald's All-American (1979)
- Stats at Basketball Reference

Terrell DeWayne Fair (Hebrew: טרי פייר; June 25, 1960 – January 30, 2020) was an American-Israeli professional basketball player. He played college basketball for the University of Georgia before playing professionally in Israel. A two-time Israeli Basketball Premier League champion and Israeli State Cup winner. In 2013 he was inducted in the Georgia Sports Hall of Fame. Fair died at age 59 in his hometown of Macon, Georgia.

== Early life and college career ==
Fair attended Southwest Macon High School in Macon, Georgia, where he was named a consensus All-American as a senior after he led the Patriots to the 1979 national championship while averaging 21.1 points and 15.2 rebounds per game.

Fair played four years of college basketball for the University of Georgia. Fair, alongside Dominique Wilkins, LaVon Mercer, Derrick Floyd and Lamar Heard, helped lead the Bulldogs reach numerous firsts during their careers. Georgia earned its first postseason bid ever in 1981 with an invitation to the NIT. The Bulldogs returned to the NIT in 1982 and advanced to the semifinals at the Madison Square Garden. The following season, he led Georgia to its first NCAA Tournament appearance and only Final Four in school history. He scored a career-high 27 points in a win against St. John's in the Sweet 16. Fair averaged 12.1 points and 7.5 rebounds per game in four seasons. Fair completed his career as the Bulldogs' all-time leader in steals (194) and games played (123) and also ranked No. 2 in rebounds (923), No. 4 in points (1,492) and No. 9 in assists (177). Fair still ranks No. 2 in rebounds, No. 10 in points and No. 6 in steals. In 1983, Fair was a third-team All-SEC selection.

=== College statistics ===
| Year | Team | GP | GS | MPG | FG% | 3P% | FT% | RPG | APG | SPG | BPG | PPG |
|---|---|---|---|---|---|---|---|---|---|---|---|---|
| 1979–80 | Georgia | 27 | | 35.0 | .544 | – | .712 | 10.0 | 1.2 | – | – | 13.6 |
| 1980–81 | Georgia | 31 | | 35.5 | .553 | – | .735 | 7.7 | 1.4 | 1.3 | 0.5 | 12.5 |
| 1981–82 | Georgia | 31 | 27 | 28.5 | .509 | – | .616 | 6.1 | 1.3 | 1.2 | 0.7 | 8.8 |
| 1982–83 | Georgia | 34 | 33 | 30.6 | .534 | – | .663 | 6.6 | 1.6 | 2.1 | 1.3 | 13.6 |
| Career | | 123 | | 32.3 | .536 | – | .682 | 7.5 | 1.4 | 1.5 | 0.9 | 12.1 |

== Professional career; Israeli Basketball Premier League ==
Fair was selected in the fourth round of the 1983 NBA draft by the Indiana Pacers but never played for the team.

He played three seasons for Elitzur Netanya of the Israeli Basketball Premier League as a naturalized Israeli. On March 27, 1986, Fair recorded a career-high 32 points in game 2 of the 1986 Israeli League Finals series, where they eventually lost to Maccabi Tel Aviv. Fair finished his first season with Netanya averaging 15.9 points.

Fair later joined Maccabi Kiryat Motzkin, Hapoel Holon, A.S. Ramat Hasharon, and Hapoel Tel Aviv, with whom he won the 1993 Israeli State Cup. In the summer of 1993, Fair signed with Maccabi Tel Aviv, with whom he won the Israeli League championship title for two consecutive years. Fair finished his professional career with Maccabi Jerusalem.

== Death ==
On January 30, 2020, Fair died of natural causes at age 59 in his hometown of Macon, Georgia.
