= Malcolm Carson =

American football player (1959–2020)

No. 56
- Position: Guard

Personal information
- Born: November 1, 1959; Birmingham, Alabama, U.S.
- Died: September 22, 2020 (aged 60); Birmingham, Alabama, U.S.
- Listed height: 6 ft 2 in (1.88 m)
- Listed weight: 260 lb (118 kg)

Career information
- High school: Hayes (Birmingham, Alabama)
- College: University of Tennessee at Chattanooga

Career history
- Minnesota Vikings (1984)
- Stats at Pro Football Reference

Malcolm Darryl Carson (November 1, 1959 – September 22, 2020) was an American professional football player who was a guard for one game in the National Football League (NFL).

Carson was born and raised in Birmingham, Alabama and attended Hayes High School. He played collegiately at the University of Tennessee at Chattanooga.

Carson was signed as an undrafted free agent by the Minnesota Vikings during the 1984 offseason. He dressed for the season opening game against the San Diego Chargers, but was waived a few days later.
