= 1982–83 Tennessee Volunteers basketball team =

American college basketball season

1982–83 Tennessee Volunteers basketball

NCAA tournament, Second round
- Conference: Southeastern Conference
- East
- Record: 20–12 (9–9 SEC)
- Head coach: Don DeVoe (5th season)
- Home arena: Stokely Athletic Center

1982–83 Southeastern Conference men's basketball standings
	Conf.				Overall
Team	W		L	PCT	W		L	PCT
No. 12 Kentucky	13	–	5	.722	23	–	8	.742
LSU	10	–	8	.556	19	–	13	.594
Ole Miss	10	–	8	.556	19	–	12	.613
Vanderbilt	9	–	9	.500	19	–	14	.576
Mississippi State	9	–	9	.500	17	–	12	.586
No. 18 Georgia †	9	–	9	.500	24	–	10	.706
Tennessee	9	–	9	.500	20	–	12	.625
Auburn	8	–	10	.444	15	–	13	.536
Alabama	8	–	10	.444	20	–	12	.625
Florida	5	–	13	.278	13	–	18	.419
† 1983 SEC tournament winner Rankings from AP Poll

The 1982–83 Tennessee Volunteers basketball team represented the University of Tennessee as a member of the Southeastern Conference during the 1982–83 college basketball season. Led by head coach Don DeVoe, the team played their home games at the Stokely Athletic Center in Knoxville, Tennessee. The Volunteers finished with a record of 20–12 (9–9 SEC, 7th) and received an at-large bid to the 1983 NCAA tournament as the 8 seed in the Mideast region. After an opening round win over Marquette, Tennessee was defeated by high-flying No. 1 seed Louisville.

Senior Dale Ellis was named the SEC Player of the Year for the second consecutive season. Ellis would be drafted by the Dallas Mavericks with the 9th pick of the first round of the 1983 NBA draft.

== Roster ==
1982–83 Tennessee Volunteers men's basketball team
Players
Coaches

Pos.	#	Name	Height	Weight	Year	Hometown
G	10	Tyrone Beaman	5 ft 11 in (1.8 m)	—	Jr	Niagara Falls, New York
F	14	Dale Ellis	6 ft 7 in (2.01 m)	205 lb (93 kg)	Sr	Marietta, Georgia
G	21	Michael Brooks	6 ft 3 in (1.91 m)	—	Jr	Memphis, Tennessee
G	22	Jerald Hyatt	6 ft 3 in (1.91 m)	—	So	Knoxville, Tennessee
G	23	Myron Carter	6 ft 3 in (1.91 m)	—	So	Madison, Tennessee
C	24	Walter Evans	6 ft 6 in (1.98 m)	—	So	Morristown, Tennessee
F	25	Seth McDonald	6 ft 8 in (2.03 m)	—	Jr	Tullahoma, Tennessee
F	31	Kevin Woods	6 ft 5 in (1.96 m)	—	So	Baltimore, Maryland
F	32	Kirk Naler	6 ft 8 in (2.03 m)	—	So	Gadsden, Alabama
C	33	Dan Federmann	6 ft 10 in (2.08 m)	—	Jr	Cincinnati, Ohio
F	40	Willie Burton	6 ft 7 in (2.01 m)	—	Jr	Millen, Georgia

Head coach

- Don DeVoe (Ohio State)

Assistant coach(es)

Legend

- (C) Team captain
- (S) Suspended
- (I) Ineligible
- (W) Walk-on
- Injured
- Current redshirt

Roster

== Schedule and results ==
Date time, TV	Rank^{#}	Opponent^{#}	Result	Record	Site (attendance) city, state
Regular season
Nov 27, 1982*	No. 13	Biscayne	W 84–59	1–0	Stokely Athletics Center; Knoxville, Tennessee
Dec 1, 1982*	No. 14	at Chattanooga	W 55–49	2–0	UTC Arena; Chattanooga, Tennessee
Dec 8, 1982*	No. 14	Arizona	W 92–73	3–0	Stokely Athletics Center; Knoxville, Tennessee
Dec 11, 1982*	No. 14	New Orleans	W 76–74	4–0	Stokely Center; Knoxville, Tennessee
Dec 17, 1982*	No. 11	St. Francis (NY); Volunteer Classic	W 70–51	5–0	Stokely Center; Knoxville, Tennessee
Dec 18, 1982*	No. 11	Miami (OH); Volunteer Classic	W 69–62	6–0	Stokely Center; Knoxville, Tennessee
Dec 22, 1982*	No. 11	Oklahoma City	W 99–56	7–0	Stokely Center; Knoxville, Tennessee
Dec 28, 1982*	No. 8	vs. San Jose State; Las Vegas Holiday Classic	W 50–42	8–0	Las Vegas Convention Center; Las Vegas, Nevada
Dec 29, 1982*	No. 8	at No. 15 UNLV; Las Vegas Holiday Classic	L 54–70	8–1	Las Vegas Convention Center; Las Vegas, Nevada
Jan 3, 1983	No. 12	Georgia	W 87–76	9–1 (1–0)	Stokely Center; Knoxville, Tennessee
Jan 8, 1983	No. 12	at Ole Miss	L 55–56	9–2 (1–1)	Tad Smith Coliseum; Oxford, Mississippi
Jan 10, 1983	No. 12	at LSU	W 59–58	10–2 (2–1)	LSU Assembly Center; Baton Rouge, Louisiana
Jan 15, 1983	No. 18	Mississippi State	L 74–75	10–3 (2–2)	Stokely Center; Knoxville, Tennessee
Jan 18, 1983; TVS		Alabama	W 73–64	11–3 (3–2)	Stokely Center; Knoxville, Tennessee
Jan 22, 1983		at Florida	L 74–78	11–4 (3–3)	Stephen C. O'Connell Center; Gainesville, Florida
Jan 24, 1983		at Auburn	W 80–77	12–4 (4–3)	Beard-Eaves-Memorial Coliseum; Auburn, Alabama
Jan 29, 1983		Vanderbilt	L 60–61	12–5 (4–4)	Stokely Center; Knoxville, Tennessee
Jan 31, 1983		No. 15 Kentucky	W 65–63	13–5 (5–4)	Stokely Center; Knoxville, Tennessee
Feb 5, 1983*		Ole Miss	W 65–53	14–5 (6–4)	Stokely Center; Knoxville, Tennessee
Feb 7, 1983		LSU	W 66–63	15–5 (7–4)	Stokely Center; Knoxville, Tennessee
Feb 12, 1983		at Mississippi State	L 66–75	15–6 (7–5)	Humphrey Coliseum; Starkville, Mississippi
Feb 14, 1983		at Alabama	L 78–90	15–7 (7–6)	Coleman Coliseum; Tuscaloosa, Alabama
Feb 19, 1983		Florida	W 78–53	16–7 (8–6)	Stokely Center; Knoxville, Tennessee
Feb 22, 1983; TVS	No. 20	Auburn	W 82–74	17–7 (9–6)	Stokely Center; Knoxville, Tennessee
Feb 24, 1983	No. 20	at Vanderbilt	L 68–69	17–8 (9–7)	Memorial Gymnasium; Nashville, Tennessee
Feb 27, 1983; NBC	No. 20	at No. 10 Kentucky	L 61–69	17–9 (9–8)	Rupp Arena; Lexington, Kentucky
Mar 5, 1983		at Georgia	L 59–74	17–10 (9–9)	Stegeman Coliseum; Athens, Georgia
SEC tournament
Mar 7, 1983*; TVS		vs. Florida; First round	W 78–62	18–10	Birmingham-Jefferson Civic Center; Birmingham, Alabama
Mar 8, 1983*; TVS		vs. LSU; Quarterfinals	W 74–71	19–10	Birmingham-Jefferson Civic Center; Birmingham, Alabama
Mar 9, 1983*; TVS		vs. Georgia; Semifinals	L 60–79	19–11	Birmingham-Jefferson Civic Center; Birmingham, Alabama
NCAA tournament
Mar 18, 1983*	(8 ME)	vs. (9 ME) Marquette; First round	W 57–56	20–11	Roberts Municipal Stadium; Evansville, Illinois
Mar 20, 1983*	(8 ME)	vs. (1 ME) No. 2 Louisville; Second round	L 57–70	20–12	Roberts Municipal Stadium; Evansville, Illinois
*Non-conference game. ^{#}Rankings from AP poll. (#) Tournament seedings in parentheses. ME=Mideast. All times are in Eastern Time.

== NBA draft ==
Round	Pick	Player	NBA club
1	9	Dale Ellis	Dallas Mavericks
