= Terrell Bell =

American basketball player (born 1973)

Personal information
- Born: December 15, 1973 (age 52) Athens, Georgia, U.S.
- Listed height: 6 ft 10 in (2.08 m)
- Listed weight: 240 lb (109 kg)

Career information
- High school: Cedar Shoals (Athens, Georgia)
- College: Georgia (1992–1996)
- NBA draft: 1996: 2nd round, 50th overall pick
- Drafted by: Houston Rockets
- Position: Power forward

Career history
- 1996–1997: Oklahoma City Cavalry
- 1997: Valencia Basket
- 1997–1999: Rockford Lightning
- 1999: Idaho Stampede
- 2000–2001: Memphis Houn'Dawgs
- 2003–2004: MKS Start Lublin
- 2005: Obras Sanitarias
- Stats at Basketball Reference

Johneirio Terrell Bell (born December 15, 1973) is an American former professional basketball player from the University of Georgia. He was drafted by Houston Rockets in the second round (50th pick overall) of the 1996 NBA draft.
