= 1983 SEC men's basketball tournament =

Annual college basketball tournament

- Classification: Division I
- Season: 1982–83
- Teams: 10
- Site: BJCC Coliseum; Birmingham, Alabama
- Champions: Georgia Bulldogs (1st title)
- Winning coach: Hugh Durham (1st title)
- MVP: Vern Fleming (Georgia)
- Attendance: 130,972
- Television: TVS Television Network; CBS (Championship Game; nationwide)

1982–83 Southeastern Conference men's basketball standings
| | Conf. | | | | Overall |
| Team | W | | L | PCT | W | | L | PCT |
|---|---|---|---|---|---|---|---|---|
| No. 12 Kentucky | 13 | – | 5 | .722 | 23 | – | 8 | .742 |
| LSU | 10 | – | 8 | .556 | 19 | – | 13 | .594 |
| Ole Miss | 10 | – | 8 | .556 | 19 | – | 12 | .613 |
| Vanderbilt | 9 | – | 9 | .500 | 19 | – | 14 | .576 |
| Mississippi State | 9 | – | 9 | .500 | 17 | – | 12 | .586 |
| No. 18 Georgia † | 9 | – | 9 | .500 | 24 | – | 10 | .706 |
| Tennessee | 9 | – | 9 | .500 | 20 | – | 12 | .625 |
| Auburn | 8 | – | 10 | .444 | 15 | – | 13 | .536 |
| Alabama | 8 | – | 10 | .444 | 20 | – | 12 | .625 |
| Florida | 5 | – | 13 | .278 | 13 | – | 18 | .419 |
† 1983 SEC tournament winner Rankings from AP Poll

The 1983 SEC Men's Basketball Tournament took place from March 10–13, 1983, at the BJCC Coliseum in Birmingham, Alabama. The Georgia Bulldogs won the tournament championship title, and received the SEC's automatic bid to the 1983 NCAA Division I Men's Basketball tournament. This tournament marked Georgia's first ever SEC tournament championship title.

Television coverage of the entire tournament was produced and regionally syndicated by the TVS Television Network, with CBS broadcasting the championship game nationally in areas outside the SEC's geographical footprint. Tom Hammond handled play-by-play commentary, while Joe Dean provided color analogy.

== Bracket ==
First Round; Thursday, March 10; TVS
8 | Auburn | 61
9 | Alabama | 62
7 | Tennessee | 78
10 | Florida | 62

Second Round; Friday, March 11; TVS
1 | #10 Kentucky | 64
9 | Alabama | 69
4 | Vanderbilt | 61
5 | Mississippi State | 76
2 | LSU | 71
7 | Tennessee | 74
6 | Georgia | 60
3 | Ole Miss | 55

Semi-Finals; Saturday, March 12; TVS
9 | Alabama | 51
5 | Mississippi State | 50
7 | Tennessee | 60
6 | Georgia | 79

Finals; Sunday, March 13; CBS
9 | Alabama | 71
6 | Georgia | 86
