= Wimp Sanderson =

American college basketball coach

Biographical details
- Born: August 8, 1937 (age 89); Florence, Alabama, U.S.

Playing career
- 1955–1956: Abilene Christian
- 1956–1959: Florence State

Coaching career (HC unless noted)
- 1960–1961: Alabama (GA)
- 1961–1980: Alabama (assistant)
- 1980–1992: Alabama
- 1994–1999: Arkansas–Little Rock

Head coaching record
- Overall: 352–177
- Tournaments: 12–10 (NCAA Division I); 1–2 (NIT)

Accomplishments and honors

Championships
- 5 SEC tournament (1982, 1987, 1989–1991); SEC regular season (1987); Sun Belt regular season (1996)

Awards
- 2× SEC Coach of the Year (1987, 1989); Sun Belt Coach of the Year (1996)

Winfrey "Wimp" Sanderson (born August 8, 1937) is an American former college basketball coach. He coached at the University of Alabama from 1980 to 1992 followed by stint at the University of Arkansas at Little Rock from 1994 to 1999.

Sanderson was born in Florence, Alabama. He attended Coffee High School and graduated from Florence State College, in 1959. In 1960 he became a graduate assistant under Hayden Riley at Alabama, and in 1961 he was made a full-time assistant. Sanderson served in this capacity for 20 years under both Riley and C. M. Newton, eventually becoming Newton's top assistant. When Newton resigned to become assistant commissioner of the Southeastern Conference, Sanderson was named his successor. During his 12-year tenure as head coach, Alabama had a 267–119 record, averaging 21.8 wins per season, and won five SEC tournaments. The teams appeared in one NIT and ten NCAA tournaments, reaching the Sweet 16 six times. Sanderson is the only coach in university history to record 200 or more victories within his first 10 seasons. He was named SEC Coach of the Year in 1987 and 1989, and National Coach of the Year in 1987.

He was known for wearing plaid sport jackets on the sidelines. During his tenure, Coleman Coliseum featured a crimson-and-white plaid midcourt logo and was nicknamed the "Plaid Palace", while some fans and the Million Dollar Band adopted plaid clothing and nicknames in his honor.

== Early life and playing career ==
Winfrey Sanderson was named for his uncle, Hayes Winfrey, who died from kidney problems in his twenties after he blocked a punt in his stomach during a high school football game.

His father, who worked for an auto parts company, died when he was six, and Sanderson, an only child, shared an apartment with his mother, Christine, a secretary for the Veterans Administration. During his senior year in high school, he became class president.

In 1955, Sanderson went to Abilene Christian College to play basketball. He planned to go into radio and television, but flunking Spanish soured his plans. He transferred to Florence State (now the University of North Alabama) where he continued playing basketball and graduated with a degree in physical education. He took a high school head coaching job in Carbon Hill, Alabama and one year later, in 1959–60, he went to Alabama as a graduate assistant under Hayden Riley for $75 a month.

Sanderson played his freshman season of college basketball at Abilene Christian before transferring back to Florence State. In three seasons with the Lions, from 1957 to 1959, he scored 1,076 points and averaged 14.9 points over his 72-game career. He was named team captain as both a junior and a senior and led the Lions in scoring in 1958 with 403 points. His best single-game performance came against Jacksonville State University in 1958 when he scored 31 points. Sanderson graduated in 1959.

== Coaching career ==
=== Alabama ===
Sanderson spent 32 years at Alabama, serving as a graduate assistant for one year, a full-time assistant coach for 20 years, and head coach for 12 years. During his head coaching tenure, he led the program to 10 NCAA tournament appearances and six Sweet 16 berths. Under head coach C.M. Newton, Sanderson recruited several African-American players to the program, including Wendell Hudson.

During his tenure, Sanderson recruited several future NBA players, including Robert Horry, Derrick McKey, Latrell Sprewell, James Robinson, and David Benoit.

==== Scandal and resignation ====
Sanderson resigned from Alabama on May 18, 1992, days after Nancy Watts, his longtime secretary, filed a sexual discrimination lawsuit against him and the university with the US Equal Opportunity Commission. Both Sanderson and Watts admitted they had an affair from about 1970 to 1985, but both offered conflicting stories about what happened on March 17, 1992. Watts said that on that day, two days before Alabama was to play Stanford in the NCAA tournament, Sanderson punched her in the face during an argument, giving her a black eye. Sanderson said Watts had become hysterical and that, in an effort to defend himself, he extended his hand and she collided with it, resulting in the injury. More than a year later, Watts' lawsuit against Sanderson, the university and then-athletic director Hootie Ingram, was settled out of court, days before it was scheduled to go to trial.

Alabama and Sanderson's homeowner's insurance policy paid Watts $275,000. Sanderson's employment with the university ended after 32 years. Following the settlement, Sanderson stated that he disagreed with the handling of the accusations but considered the matter resolved.

David Hobbs, a former assistant, was promoted as head coach when Sanderson resigned. Mark Gottfried, a former player under Sanderson, followed Hobbs and coached for 10-1/2 seasons before he resigned on January 26, 2009.

=== Arkansas–Little Rock ===
In 1994, Sanderson was hired as the head coach at the University of Arkansas at Little Rock. He coached the Trojans to an appearance in the National Invitation Tournament in 1996, and coached future NBA player Derek Fisher.

== Personal life ==
As of 2007, Sanderson resided in Birmingham, Alabama.

== Awards ==
- Named SEC Coach of the Decade for the 1980s by the Lexington Herald-Leader
- 1987, 1989 and 1990 SEC Coach of the Year
- 1987 National Coach of the Year
- Inducted into the Alabama Sports Hall of Fame in 1990
- UNA Alumnus of the Year in 1990

== Head coaching record ==
Record table
Season	Team	Overall	Conference	Standing	Postseason
Alabama Crimson Tide (Southeastern Conference) (1980–1992)
1980–81	Alabama	18–11	10–8	4th	NIT Second Round
1981–82	Alabama	24–7	12–6	3rd	NCAA Division I Sweet 16
1982–83	Alabama	20–12	8–10	T–8th	NCAA Division I First Round
1983–84	Alabama	18–12	10–8	5th	NCAA Division I First Round
1984–85	Alabama	23–10	11–7	T–3rd	NCAA Division I Sweet 16
1985–86	Alabama	24–9	13–5	T–2nd	NCAA Division I Sweet 16
1986–87	Alabama	28–5	16–2	1st	NCAA Division I Sweet 16
1987–88	Alabama	14–17	6–12	T–8th	
1988–89	Alabama	23–8	12–6	T–2nd	NCAA Division I First Round
1989–90	Alabama	26–9	12–6	2nd	NCAA Division I Sweet 16
1990–91	Alabama	23–10	12–6	2nd	NCAA Division I Sweet 16
1991–92	Alabama	26–9	10–6	3rd (Western)	NCAA Division I Second Round
Alabama:		267–119 (.692)	132–82 (.617)		
Arkansas–Little Rock Trojans (Sun Belt Conference) (1994–1999)
1994–95	Arkansas–Little Rock	17–12	9–9	T–5th	
1995–96	Arkansas–Little Rock	23–7	14–4	T–1st	NIT First Round
1996–97	Arkansas–Little Rock	18–11	11–7	3rd	
1997–98	Arkansas–Little Rock	15–13	10–8	4th	
1998–99	Arkansas–Little Rock	12–15	5–9	T–7th	
Arkansas–Little Rock:		85–58 (.594)	49–37 (.570)		
Total:		352–177 (.665)			
National champion Postseason invitational champion Conference regular season champion Conference regular season and conference tournament champion Division regular season champion Division regular season and conference tournament champion Conference tournament champion
