= 1982–83 Georgia Bulldogs basketball team =

American college basketball season

1982–83 Georgia Bulldogs basketball

SEC tournament champions

NCAA tournament, Final Four
- Conference: Southeastern Conference

Ranking
- Coaches: No. 15
- AP: No. 18
- Record: 24–10 (9–9 SEC)
- Head coach: Hugh Durham (5th season)
- Assistant coaches: Don Beasley; Eddie Biedenbach; Larry Gay; Joe Cunningham
- Home arena: Stegeman Coliseum

1982–83 Southeastern Conference men's basketball standings
	Conf.				Overall
Team	W		L	PCT	W		L	PCT
No. 12 Kentucky	13	–	5	.722	23	–	8	.742
LSU	10	–	8	.556	19	–	13	.594
Ole Miss	10	–	8	.556	19	–	12	.613
Vanderbilt	9	–	9	.500	19	–	14	.576
Mississippi State	9	–	9	.500	17	–	12	.586
No. 18 Georgia †	9	–	9	.500	24	–	10	.706
Tennessee	9	–	9	.500	20	–	12	.625
Auburn	8	–	10	.444	15	–	13	.536
Alabama	8	–	10	.444	20	–	12	.625
Florida	5	–	13	.278	13	–	18	.419
† 1983 SEC tournament winner Rankings from AP Poll

The 1982–83 Georgia Bulldogs basketball team represented the University of Georgia as a member of the Southeastern Conference during the 1982–83 NCAA men's basketball season. The team was led by head coach Hugh Durham, and played their home games at Stegeman Coliseum in Athens, Georgia. The Bulldogs won the SEC tournament, and continued their winning ways in the East Region of the NCAA tournament. They defeated #1 seed St. John's and #2 seed North Carolina to reach the Final Four for the first time in program history. The Bulldogs lost to Jim Valvano's famed North Carolina State Wolfpack to finish the season at 24–10.

== Roster ==
1982–83 Georgia Bulldogs men's basketball team
Players
Coaches

Pos.	#	Name	Height	Weight	Year	Hometown
G	4	Gerald Crosby	6 ft 1 in (1.85 m)	185 lb (84 kg)	So	Birmingham, AL
G	10	Vern Fleming	6 ft 5 in (1.96 m)	185 lb (84 kg)	Jr	New York, NY
G	14	Monroe Jones	5 ft 11 in (1.8 m)	170 lb (77 kg)	Jr	Bevinsville, KY
G	20	Derrick Floyd	6 ft 3 in (1.91 m)	185 lb (84 kg)	Sr	Miami, FL
G/F	22	Horace McMillan	6 ft 5 in (1.96 m)	185 lb (84 kg)	Fr	Quincy, FL
F	25	James Banks	6 ft 6 in (1.98 m)	215 lb (98 kg)	Jr	Atlanta, GA
G	30	Donald Hartry	6 ft 2 in (1.88 m)	170 lb (77 kg)	Fr	Milledgeville, GA
F/C	31	Richard Corhen	6 ft 6 in (1.98 m)	200 lb (91 kg)	So	Albany, GA
F	32	Lamar Heard	6 ft 5 in (1.96 m)	190 lb (86 kg)	Sr	Cartersville, GA
C	34	Troy Hitchcock	7 ft 2 in (2.18 m)	190 lb (86 kg)	Fr	Columbus, OH
F/C	35	Terry Fair	6 ft 7 in (2.01 m)	210 lb (95 kg)	Sr	Macon, GA

Head coach

- Hugh Durham (Florida State)

Assistant coach(es)

- Don Beasley (Northwestern State)
- Eddie Biedenbach (NC State)
- Larry Gay (Florida State)
- Joe Cunningham

Legend

- (C) Team captain
- (S) Suspended
- (I) Ineligible
- (W) Walk-on
- Injured
- Current redshirt

== Schedule and results ==
Date time, TV	Rank^{#}	Opponent^{#}	Result	Record	Site city, state
Regular season
Nov 26, 1982*		Georgia State	W 99–62	1–0	Stegeman Coliseum; Athens, GA
Nov 30, 1982*		Randolph–Macon	W 81–53	2–0	Stegeman Coliseum; Athens, GA
Dec 4, 1982*		at Georgia Tech	W 82–67	3–0	Omni Coliseum; Atlanta, GA
Dec 11, 1982*		Wesleyan College	W 93–55	4–0	Stegeman Coliseum; Athens, GA
Dec 15, 1982*		at Texas	W 75–54	5–0	Frank Erwin Center; Austin, TX
Dec 18, 1982*		at Augusta	W 104–60	6–0	Augusta-Richmond County Civic Center; Augusta, GA
Dec 22, 1982*		vs. Georgia Southern	W 57–55	7–0	Martin Luther King Arena; Savannah, GA
Dec 29, 1982*		vs. Columbia; Cotton States Classic	W 86–53	8–0	Omni Coliseum; Atlanta, GA
Dec 30, 1982*		vs. Western Kentucky; Cotton States Classic	W 90–69	9–0	Omni Coliseum; Atlanta, GA
Jan 3, 1983*		at No. 12 Tennessee	L 76–87	9–1 (0–1)	Stokely Athletic Center; Knoxville, TN
Jan 8, 1983*		at LSU	L 56–60	9–2 (0–2)	Maravich Assembly Center; Baton Rouge, LA
Jan 10, 1983*		at Ole Miss	W 68–53	10–2 (1–2)	Tad Smith Coliseum; Oxford, MS
Jan 15, 1983*		No. 10 Alabama	W 67–64	11–2 (2–2)	Stegeman Coliseum; Athens, GA
Jan 17, 1983*		Mississippi State	W 75–59	12–2 (3–2)	Stegeman Coliseum; Athens, GA
Jan 22, 1983*		at No. 20 Auburn	L 64–66	12–3 (3–3)	Beard–Eaves–Memorial Coliseum; Auburn, AL
Jan 25, 1983*		at Florida	W 83–79	13–3 (4–3)	Stephen C. O'Connell Center; Gainesville, FL
Jan 29, 1983		No. 10 Kentucky	W 70–63	14–3 (5–3)	Stegeman Coliseum; Athens, GA
Jan 31, 1983		Vanderbilt	W 86–61	15–3 (6–3)	Stegeman Coliseum; Athens, GA
Feb 5, 1983	No. 19	LSU	L 59–70	15–4 (6–4)	Stegeman Coliseum; Athens, GA
Feb 7, 1983	No. 19	Ole Miss	L 59–76	15–5 (6–5)	Stegeman Coliseum; Athens, GA
Feb 12, 1983		at Alabama	L 71–73	15–6 (6–6)	Coleman Coliseum; Tuscaloosa, AL
Feb 15, 1983		at Mississippi State	L 64–73	15–7 (6–7)	Humphrey Coliseum; Starkville, MS
Feb 19, 1983		Auburn	W 67–60	16–7 (7–7)	Stegeman Coliseum; Athens, GA
Feb 21, 1983		Florida	W 80–65	17–7 (8–7)	Stegeman Coliseum; Athens, GA
Feb 26, 1983		at No. 10 Kentucky	L 72–81	17–8 (8–8)	Rupp Arena; Lexington, KY
Feb 28, 1983		at Vanderbilt	L 70–71	17–9 (8–9)	Memorial Gymnasium; Nashville, TN
Mar 5, 1983		Tennessee	W 74–59	18–9 (9–9)	Stegeman Coliseum; Athens, GA
SEC Tournament
Mar 8, 1983*		vs. Ole Miss; SEC tournament Quarterfinal	W 60–55	19–9	Birmingham-Jefferson Civic Center; Birmingham, AL
Mar 9, 1983*		vs. Tennessee; SEC Tournament Semifinal	W 79–60	20–9	Birmingham-Jefferson Civic Center; Birmingham, AL
Mar 10, 1983*		at Alabama; SEC tournament championship	W 86–71	21–9	Birmingham-Jefferson Civic Center; Birmingham, AL
NCAA Tournament
Mar 19, 1983*	(4 E) No. 18	vs. (5 E) VCU; Second Round	W 56–54	22–9	Greensboro Coliseum; Greensboro, NC
Mar 25, 1983*	(4 E) No. 18	vs. (1 E) No. 3 St. John's; East Regional semifinal	W 70–67	23–9	Carrier Dome; Syracuse, NY
Mar 27, 1983*	(4 E) No. 18	vs. (2 E) No. 8 North Carolina; East Regional final	W 82–77	24–9	Carrier Dome; Syracuse, NY
Apr 2, 1983*	(4 E) No. 18	vs. (6 W) No. 16 NC State; National semifinal	L 60–67	24–10	The Pit; Albuquerque, NM
*Non-conference game. ^{#}Rankings from AP Poll. (#) Tournament seedings in parentheses. E=East.
