= Hayes High School (Birmingham, Alabama) =

Carol W. Hayes High School

Location
- Birmingham, Alabama; 33.532°N 86.772°W

Information
- Type: Public
- Established: 1960
- Closed: 2008
- Principal: Anthony Gardner
- Colors: Orange and Navy Blue
- Nickname: Pacesetters

Carol W. Hayes High School was a public 9–12 high school in Birmingham, Alabama. It was closed after the 2007–08 school year.

== History ==
The school was established in September 1960 in Avondale, in the eastern section of Birmingham. It is named for Dr. Carol William Hayes, the city's former "Director of Negro Schools".

The school added a twelfth grade in 1961, and the first seniors graduated in May 1962. Hayes remained an all-black high school until it was desegregated in 1970.

Carol W. Hayes High School graduated senior classes from 1962 to 1989, when it was converted into a middle school. In 2003 it reverted to a high school, and graduated its first class in sixteen years in 2005. Declining enrollment in the school system, however, led the board to close Hayes.

Demolition of the school building was completed in March 2009.

== Notable alumni ==
- Malcolm Carson, Former NFL guard
- Buck Johnson, Former NBA Star
