= Georgia Bulldogs basketball =

Basketball team of the University of Georgia

Georgia Bulldogs men's basketball
2026–27 Georgia Bulldogs basketball team
- University: University of Georgia
- First season: 1905–06; 121 years ago
- Athletic director: Josh Brooks
- Head coach: Mike White; 4th season, 78–56 (.582)
- Location: Athens, Georgia
- Arena: Stegeman Coliseum (capacity: 10,523)
- NCAA division: Division I
- Conference: SEC
- Nickname: Bulldogs
- Colors: Red and black
- Student section: The Dawg Pound
- All-time record: 1,537–1,423 (.519)
- NCAA tournament record: 7–13 (.350)

NCAA Division I tournament Final Four
- 1983
Other NCAA Division I tournament results
Elite Eight	1983
Sweet Sixteen	1983, 1996
Appearances	1983, 1985, 1987, 1990, 1991, 1996, 1997, 2001, 2002, 2008, 2011, 2015, 2025, 2026

Conference tournament champions
- SoCon: 1932 SEC: 1983, 2008

Conference regular-season champions
- SIAA: 1909, 1914, 1916, 1917, 1918 SoCon: 1931 SEC: 1990

Conference division champions
- SEC East: 2002

Uniforms
Home	Away	Alternate

The Georgia Bulldogs men's basketball program is the men's college basketball team representing the University of Georgia in Athens, Georgia. Established in 1905, the team has competed in the Southeastern Conference since the conference’s inception in 1932. As of 2020 the Bulldogs have amassed a record of 1,434–1,319. Though it has been historically overshadowed by the school's football program, the Bulldogs' basketball squad has had its share of successes, including a trip to the NCAA Final Four in 1983 under head coach Hugh Durham.

== History ==
=== Conference affiliations ===
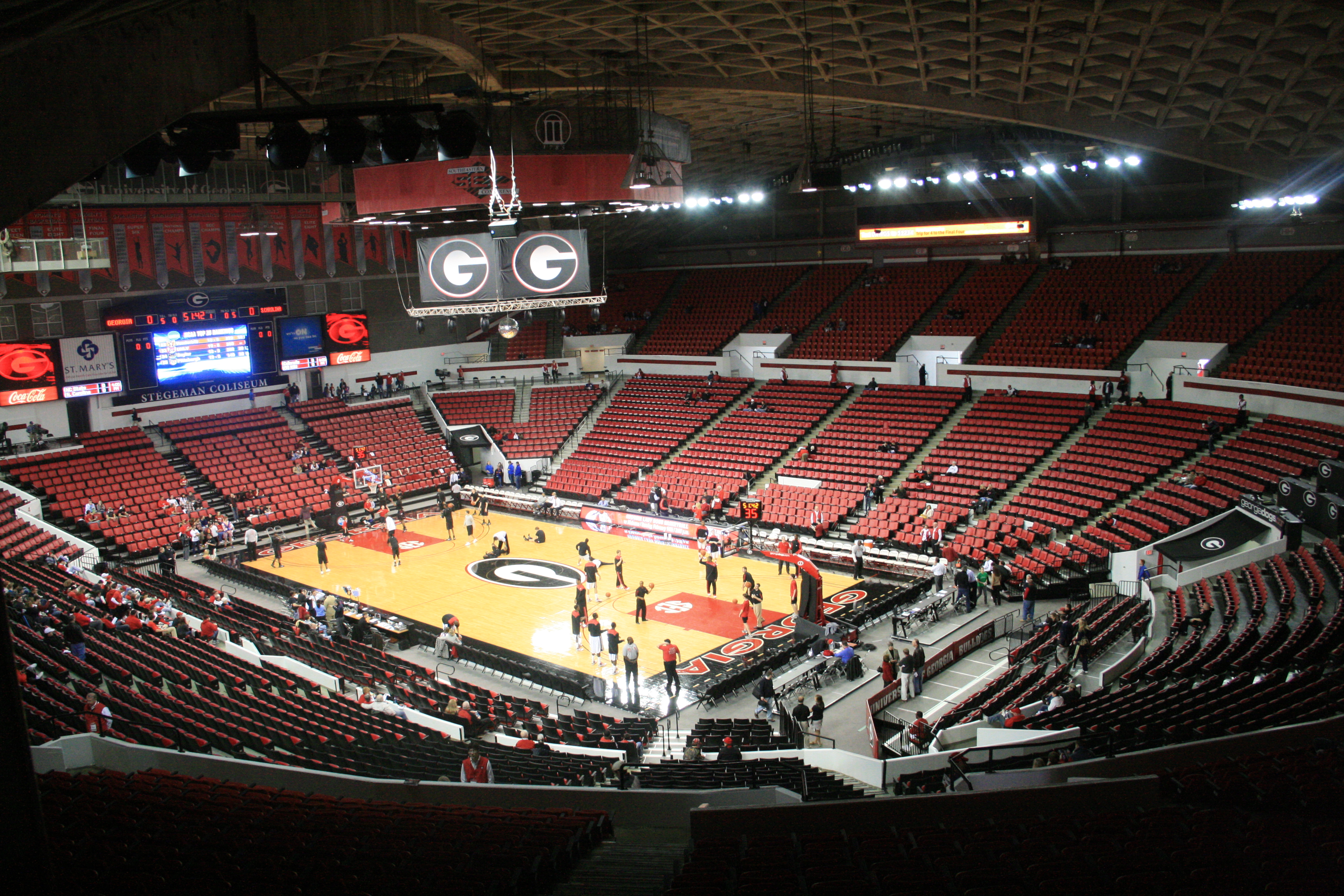
Stegeman Coliseum

Georgia was a founding member of the Southern Intercollegiate Athletic Association (SIAA), the first collegiate athletic conference formed in the United States. Georgia participated in the SIAA from its establishment in 1895 until 1921. In 1921, the Bulldogs, along with 12 other teams, left the SIAA and formed the Southern Conference. In 1932, the Georgia Bulldogs left the Southern Conference to form and join the Southeastern Conference (SEC).

=== 1931–1932 ===
Coach Rex Enright led Georgia to great success in the old Southern Conference during the 1931 and 1932 seasons. His 1931 team finished with a 23–2 (15–1) record. The Bulldogs were upset in the Southern Conference tournament semi-finals by Maryland, 26–25.

The 1932 team didn't have the dominating record that the 1931 team did, finishing 19–7 (7–4). However, this team did something that the previous year's team could not do in winning the Southern Conference tournament defeating Mississippi State, Virginia, Duke, and North Carolina.

=== 1981–1982 ===
Coach Hugh Durham brought Georgia to its first ever postseason appearance in 1981. That team finished with a 19–12 (9–9) record. They earned a National Invitation Tournament (NIT) bid and the enthusiasm surrounding the program earned them home games in first defeating Old Dominion and then in a loss to South Alabama.

The 1982 Bulldogs were 19–12 (10–8) were once again NIT bound. This time UGA made it all the way to the NIT Final Four defeating Temple, Maryland, and Virginia Tech before losing a heartbreaker to Purdue at Madison Square Garden.

These two teams marked the beginning of a postseason streak of eight straight seasons, longest in Georgia basketball history. This string included three NCAA appearances (including one Final Four in 1983) and five NIT bids. This was a remarkable streak of consistency for a program that had never before experienced the postseason beyond the SEC tournament.

=== 1983 ===
Former NBA star Dominique Wilkins is considered the greatest player in school history. However, Wilkins never played in the NCAA tournament; the Bulldogs made their first NCAA appearance in 1983—which would have been Wilkins' senior year had he not opted for the NBA. The 1983 team made it to the Final Four of the NCAA Championship before being eliminated by eventual champion North Carolina State. On the way to the Final Four, UGA defeated Virginia Commonwealth, #3 St. John's led by legendary coach Lou Carnesecca and Chris Mullin, and defending national champion North Carolina led by Dean Smith and featuring Michael Jordan, Sam Perkins, and Brad Daugherty. The latter two victories coming at the Carrier Dome in Syracuse, New York. UGA previously had won the Southeastern Conference tournament in Birmingham, Alabama, defeating Ole Miss, Tennessee, and Alabama to earn the league's automatic bid into the NCAA tournament.

=== 1987 ===
The 1987 Georgia basketball team had multiple key players injured during the season, leaving the team with only seven players on the roster. Coach Hugh Durham had no choice but to alter the playing style of his team after conference play had started, slowing the game down and "taking the air out of the ball." What looked to be a disastrous season, where the team might not win another game, turned into an inspiring one as the team rallied to an 18–12 (10–8) record and earning an NCAA tournament bid. When Durham ordered the NCAA tournament banner to be displayed at Stegeman Coliseum, he had it made in silver, rather than the traditional red, with the initials "TMW" at the bottom. The initials standing for what this team will forever be known as in UGA basketball history, "The Miracle Workers."

=== 1996–1998 ===
Tubby Smith led the Bulldogs to a 21–10 (9–7) record securing its first NCAA bid since the 1991 season. Georgia made the most of it by defeating Clemson and the West Regional's top seed, Purdue, in Albuquerque, New Mexico, before losing a heart stopping overtime game to Syracuse in the Sweet 16.

In 1997, Georgia finished 23–9 (10–6) winning the prestigious Rainbow Classic holiday tournament in Hawaii, defeating Washington State, Memphis, and Maryland. UGA beat LSU, South Carolina, and Arkansas to advance to the SEC tournament final in Memphis, losing the final to Kentucky.

Smith's successor, Ron Jirsa, led the 1998 Bulldogs to a 21–14 (8–8) record, reaching the 20 win mark for the third consecutive year for the first time in Georgia basketball history. They would go on to reach the 1998 NIT Final Four winning at Iowa, at North Carolina State, and beating Vanderbilt at home.

=== 2008 SEC Tournament: The Dream Dawgs ===
In the 2007–2008 season, Georgia's men's basketball team came into the 2008 SEC men's basketball tournament with a 13–16 overall record and a 4–12 conference mark. At one point, the team sustained two five-game losing streaks during a 2-of-12 stretch in conference play. In the first round of the tournament, Georgia was slated to play Ole Miss, who had beaten the Bulldogs in the season-closer, securing the Rebels' only road SEC win of the season. The game went into overtime after Rebel David Huertas hit all three free throws after a three-point shooting foul, and looked to go into a second extra period after Chris Warren did the same. However, with 0.4 seconds left in overtime, Georgia senior Dave Bliss banked in the game-winner to shock the Rebels and send Georgia into a second-round matchup with Kentucky.

On the night of March 14, 2008, tornadoes hit Atlanta, in whose Georgia Dome the SEC Tournament was housed. The Georgia-Kentucky matchup was rescheduled for the early afternoon of March 15, 2008, with the winner advancing to play the SEC West's #1 seed, Mississippi State, later that evening. The remaining games in the tournament would be played at Alexander Memorial Coliseum, the basketball complex of Georgia Tech, UGA's in-state rival. Again playing an overtime game in which Georgia star Sundiata Gaines fouled out, Georgia freshman Zac Swansey hit a turnaround three-point jumper with 1.4 seconds left to give the Bulldogs the team's first ever win over Kentucky in the SEC Tournament. That night, Georgia defeated Mississippi State 64–60 to become the first team since Kentucky in 1952 to win two tournament games in one day, and the first-ever #6 seed from a division to advance to the modern (post-1992) SEC tournament finals.

In the finals, Georgia faced Arkansas, which had lost to Georgia 82–69 in the regular season. Georgia prevailed again, at one point leading the Razorbacks by nineteen points en route to winning its first tournament championship in 25 years. Sundiata Gaines and Terrance Woodbury were both named to the All-Tournament Team, with Gaines winning the tournament's MVP. The improbable list of achievements—winning the tournament as a 6-seed, playing two games in one day to reach the finals, playing two games (against Kentucky and Mississippi State) in which Gaines fouled out with a substantial amount of time to play, doing it on a rival's home court, and winning four consecutive elimination games following a season during which their longest winning streak stood at three—earned the 2007–2008 team the nickname of Dream Dawgs.

With the victory, Georgia secured itself an automatic bid in the 2008 NCAA tournament. Georgia's appearance in the tournament was the tenth overall in team history and the first since the 2002 NCAA basketball tournament. After their SEC Championship run, the Bulldogs were seeded 14th in the NCAA Tournament, playing against the #3 seeded Xavier Musketeers. After developing a lead early in the 2nd half, the Bulldogs could not hold on, as Xavier went on to win 73–61.

Coach Dennis Felton failed to follow up the surprise successes of 2008 with victories in 2008–09, and he was fired on January 29, 2009.

=== 2009–2018: Mark Fox era ===
On April 3, 2009, Nevada head coach Mark Fox was announced as the next head coach of the Bulldogs.

In nine seasons with Fox, the Bulldogs posted a 163–133 record and made the NCAA tournament twice, in 2011 and 2015. In both instances, the Bulldogs exited in the Round of 64.

Fox was fired on March 10, 2018 following an 18–15 finish to the 2017–18 season as the Bulldogs failed to qualify for any postseason competition.

=== 2018–2022: Tom Crean era ===
On March 15, 2018, former Marquette and Indiana head coach Tom Crean was announced as the next head coach of the Bulldogs.

Anthony Edwards, Georgia native and first overall pick of the 2020 NBA draft, played his only year of college basketball for the Bulldogs in 2019-20.

=== 2022–present: Mike White era ===
On March 13, 2022, former Florida head coach Mike White was announced as the next head coach of the Bulldogs.

Under White, the Bulldogs made back-to-back NCAA Tournament appearances in 2025 and 2026.

== Team awards and records ==
=== Conference championships ===
Georgia has won one regular-season Southeastern Conference championship (1990) and two conference tournament championships (1983 and 2008). The Bulldogs were SEC Eastern Division co-Champs in 1994–1995. Georgia also was the Southern Conference champions for 1931–1932.

Conference affiliations:

- 1891–95, Independent
- 1896–1920, Southern Intercollegiate Athletic Association
- 1921–32, Southern Conference
- 1932–present, Southeastern Conference

== Postseason ==
=== NCAA tournament results ===
The Bulldogs have appeared in the NCAA tournament 14 times. Their combined record is 7–14. However, their appearances in 1985 and 2002 have been vacated by the NCAA making their official record 5–12.

Year	Seed	Round	Opponent	Result
1983	#4	Round of 32; Sweet Sixteen; Elite Eight; Final Four	#5 VCU #1 St. John's #2 North Carolina #6 NC State	W 56–54; W 70–67; W 82–77; L 60–67
1985*	#6	Round of 64; Round of 32	#11 Wichita State #3 Illinois	W 67–59; L 58–74
1987	#8	Round of 64	#9 Kansas State	L 79–82 ^{OT}
1990	#7	Round of 64	#10 Texas	L 88–100
1991	#11	Round of 64	#6 Pittsburgh	L 68–76 ^{OT}
1996	#8	Round of 64; Round of 32; Sweet Sixteen	#9 Clemson #1 Purdue #4 Syracuse	W 81–74; W 76–69; L 81–83 ^{OT}
1997	#3	Round of 64	#14 Chattanooga	L 70–73
2001	#8	Round of 64	#9 Missouri	L 68–70
2002*	#3	Round of 64; Round of 32	#14 Murray State #11 Southern Illinois	W 85–68; L 75–77
2008	#14	Round of 64	#3 Xavier	L 61–73
2011	#10	Round of 64	#7 Washington	L 65–68
2015	#10	Round of 64	#7 Michigan State	L 63–70
2025	#9	Round of 64	#8 Gonzaga	L 68–89
2026	#8	Round of 64	#9 Saint Louis	L 77–102

* Vacated by the NCAA

=== NIT results ===
The Bulldogs have appeared in the National Invitation Tournament (NIT) 15 times. Their combined record is 16–15.

Year	Round	Opponent	Result
1981	First Round; Second Round	Old Dominion; South Alabama	W 74–60; L 72–73
1982	First Round; Second Round; Quarterfinals; Semifinals	Temple; Maryland; Virginia Tech; Purdue	W 73–60; W 83–69; W 90–73; L 60–61
1984	First Round	Chattanooga	L 69–74
1986	First Round; Second Round	Chattanooga; Clemson	W 95–81; L 65–77
1988	First Round; Second Round	Georgia Southern; Middle Tennessee	W 53–48; L 54–69
1993	First Round	West Virginia	L 84–95
1995	First Round	Nebraska	L 61–69
1998	First Round; Second Round; Quarterfinals; Semifinals; 3rd Place Game	Iowa; NC State; Vanderbilt; Penn State; Fresno State	W 88–70; W 80–79; W 77–70; L 60–66; W 95–79
1999	First Round	Clemson	L 57–77
2004	First Round	Iowa State	L 74–82
2007	First Round; Second Round	Fresno State; Air Force	W 88–78; L 52–83
2014	First Round; Second Round	Vermont; Louisiana Tech	W 63–56; L 71–79
2016	First Round; Second Round	Belmont; Saint Mary's	W 93–84; L 65–77
2017	First Round	Belmont	L 69–78
2024	First Round; Second Round; Quarterfinals; Semifinals	Xavier; Wake Forest; Ohio State; Seton Hall	W 78–76; W 72–66; W 79–77; L 67–84

== Players ==
Georgia Bulldogs retired numbers
No.	Player	Pos.	Tenure	Year retired	Ref.
21	Dominique Wilkins	Forward	1979-1982	1991	

=== All-Americans ===
Player	Position	Year(s)	Selectors
Bob Lienhard (2)	Center	1969, 1970	Helms Athletic Foundation
Dominique Wilkins (2)	Forward	1981, 1982	The Sporting News, NABC, UPI, Associated Press
Vern Fleming (2)	Guard	1983, 1984	Kodak, NABC
James Banks	Forward	1984	Playboy
Cedric Henderson	Forward	1985	Associated Press
Litterial Green (2)	Guard	1989, 1991	Basketball Weekly, Associated Press
Alec Kessler	Center	1990	UPI
Jumaine Jones	Forward	1999	Associated Press
Jarvis Hayes (2)	Forward	2002, 2003	Associated Press
Kentavious Caldwell-Pope	Guard	2013	Associated Press
Yante Maten	Forward	2018	Associated Press

=== Basketball Hall of Fame ===
- Dominique Wilkins, inducted on April 3, 2006

=== Southeastern Conference Men's Basketball Player of the Year ===
- 1981: Dominique Wilkins
- 2013: Kentavious Caldwell-Pope
- 2018: Yante Maten

== Home venues ==
- Athens YMCA (1905–1911)
- Memorial Hall (1911–1919)
- The "Octagon" (1919–1920)
- Moss Auditorium (1919–1925)
- Woodruff Hall (1923–1964)
- Stegeman Coliseum (1964–present)

== See also ==
- Uga (mascot)
- Clean, Old-Fashioned Hate
