= Sonny Smith =

American college basketball coach

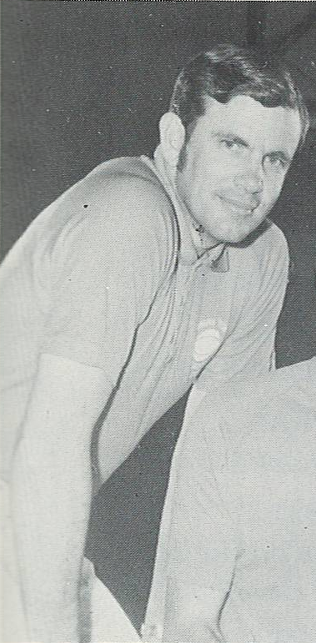
- Smith, c. 1972

Biographical details
- Born: November 15, 1936 (age 89); Roan Mountain, Tennessee, U.S.

Playing career
- 1954–1956: Holmes CC
- 1956–1958: Milligan
- Position: Guard

Coaching career (HC unless noted)
- 1969–1970: William & Mary (assistant)
- 1970–1971: Pepperdine (assistant)
- 1971–1976: Virginia Tech (assistant)
- 1976–1978: East Tennessee State
- 1978–1989: Auburn
- 1989–1998: VCU

Head coaching record
- Overall: 339–304
- Tournaments: 7–6 (NCAA); 0–1 (NIT)

Accomplishments and honors

Championships
- SEC tournament (1985); CAA regular season (1996); CAA tournament (1996)

Awards
- NABC District 6 Coach of the Year (1984); OVC Coach of the Year (1978); 2× SEC Coach of the Year (1984, 1988); CAA Coach of the Year (1996); Alabama Sports Hall of Fame

Charles H. "Sonny" Smith (born November 15, 1936) is an American former college basketball coach. Originally from Roan Mountain, Tennessee, Smith served as a head coach for 22 seasons. Best known as the head coach at Auburn from 1978 to 1989, he also coached at East Tennessee State (1976–1978) and VCU (1989–1998). Smith won the 1985 SEC tournament championship while at Auburn, and won both the CAA regular season and tournament titles in 1996 while at VCU. He made six NCAA tournament appearances as a head coach, five at Auburn and one at VCU. Smith was inducted into the Alabama Sports Hall of Fame in 2007.

== East Tennessee State ==
Sonny Smith was hired by East Tennessee State in 1976. He coached the Buccaneers for two seasons before leaving to become the head coach at Auburn. Smith finished with a record of 30–23 (.566) while at East Tennessee State.

== Auburn ==
Sonny Smith was hired by Auburn in the summer of 1978 after the recently hired Paul Lambert died in a hotel fire. Smith took the Auburn job despite returning all of his starters from the year before and moving into a new arena at East Tennessee State.

Smith guided Auburn to its first ever NCAA tournament appearance in 1984, led by future Hall of Fame player Charles Barkley. The Tigers were upset in the First Round, however, by the 12th-seeded Richmond Spiders. Smith was named SEC Coach of the Year following the 1984 season.

The 1985 regular season was considered a letdown, with the Tigers going 8–10 in conference play. Before the SEC tournament, Smith announced his plan to retire at the end of the season. However, Smith and tournament MVP Chuck Person led Auburn to its first ever SEC tournament championship, winning four games in four days for the first time in tournament history. He then coached that team to the Sweet Sixteen of the 1985 NCAA tournament. Following this success, and despite receiving an offer from his former school, East Tennessee State, Smith decided to remain at Auburn. Smith would go on to lead the Tigers to three more NCAA Tournament appearances, making it as far as the Elite Eight in 1986. This streak of five straight NCAA Tournament appearances is the longest in Auburn history. Smith was again named SEC Coach of the Year following the 1988 season.

Following a losing season in 1989, Smith left Auburn to become the head coach at VCU, citing his doubts that he could return Auburn to the success of the previous five seasons. His record at Auburn was 173–154 (.529). Until 2020, he was the only coach in Auburn men's basketball history to have three consecutive 20-win seasons.

== VCU ==
Though he did not achieve the level of success that he had while at Auburn, Sonny Smith's tenure at VCU was not without its bright spots. In his fourth season he led the Rams to 20 wins and an invitation to the 1993 NIT. Smith's best season at VCU was his seventh, the 1995–96 season. VCU had just left the struggling Metro Conference to become a member of the Colonial Athletic Association, and Smith led them to success in the new conference immediately. The Rams won both the CAA regular season and tournament championships, earning Smith's only NCAA tournament bid at VCU. Smith was named CAA Coach of the Year at the end of the season.

Smith retired at the end of the 1997–98 season, with his longtime assistant coach Mack McCarthy taking over as head coach at VCU. Smith finished at VCU with a record of 136–127 (.517), and an overall head coaching record of 339–304 (.527).

== Broadcasting career ==
After retiring from coaching, Smith joined his friend and former Alabama coach Wimp Sanderson on a sports talk radio show "The Sonny and Wimp Show" on WJOX-AM in Birmingham, Alabama. The show ran for more than six years before it was canceled in 2006. From 2003 to 2014, Smith provided the color commentary for the Atlantic Sun Game of the Week on CSS. Smith currently works alongside Andy Burcham as the color commentator for Auburn men's basketball games on the Auburn Sports Network radio broadcast.

== Head coaching record ==
Record table
Season	Team	Overall	Conference	Standing	Postseason
East Tennessee State Buccaneers (Ohio Valley Conference) (1976–1978)
1976–77	East Tennessee State	12–14	6–8	5th	
1977–78	East Tennessee State	18–9	10–4	2nd	
East Tennessee State:		30–23 (.566)	16–12 (.571)		
Auburn Tigers (Southeastern Conference) (1978–1989)
1978–79	Auburn	13–16	5–13	9th	
1979–80	Auburn	10–18	5–13	9th	
1980–81	Auburn	11–16	4–14	9th	
1981–82	Auburn	14–14	7–11	7th	
1982–83	Auburn	15–13	8–10	8th	
1983–84	Auburn	20–11	12–6	2nd	NCAA Division I first round
1984–85	Auburn	22–12	8–10	7th	NCAA Division I Sweet 16
1985–86	Auburn	22–11	13–5	2nd	NCAA Division I Elite Eight
1986–87	Auburn	18–13	9–9	5th	NCAA Division I second round
1987–88	Auburn	19–11	11–7	2nd	NCAA Division I second round
1988–89	Auburn	9–19	2–16	10th	
Auburn:		173–154 (.529)	84–114 (.424)		
VCU Rams (Sun Belt Conference) (1989–1991)
1989–90	VCU	11–17	5–9	T–6th	
1990–91	VCU	14–17	7–7	5th	
VCU Rams (Metro Conference) (1991–1995)
1991–92	VCU	14–15	5–7	T–5th	
1992–93	VCU	20–10	7–5	3rd	NIT first round
1993–94	VCU	14–13	5–7	T–5th	
1994–95	VCU	16–14	3–9	7th	
VCU Rams (Colonial Athletic Association) (1995–1998)
1995–96	VCU	24–9	14–2	1st	NCAA Division I first round
1996–97	VCU	14–13	9–7	T–3rd	
1997–98	VCU	9–19	4–12	9th	
VCU:		136–127 (.517)	59–65 (.476)		
Total:		339–304 (.527)			
National champion Postseason invitational champion Conference regular season champion Conference regular season and conference tournament champion Division regular season champion Division regular season and conference tournament champion Conference tournament champion
