= SEC men's basketball tournament =

American men's postseason college basketball tournament

- Conference basketball championship
- SEC logo
- Sport: College basketball
- Conference: Southeastern Conference
- Number of teams: 16
- Format: Single-elimination tournament
- Current stadium: Bridgestone Arena
- Current location: Nashville, Tennessee
- Played: 1933–34, 1936–1952, 1979–present
- Last contest: 2026
- Current champion: Arkansas Razorbacks (2nd title)
- Most championships: Kentucky Wildcats (32)
- TV partner: ESPN/SEC Network
- Official website: SECSports.com Men's Basketball

The SEC men's basketball tournament is the conference tournament in basketball for the Southeastern Conference (SEC). It is a single-elimination tournament that involves all league schools (currently 16). Its seeding is based on regular season records. The winner receives the conference's automatic bid to the NCAA men's basketball tournament; however, the official conference championship is awarded to the team or teams with the best regular season record.

== Format ==
With the abandonment of divisions in SEC men's basketball starting in 2011–12, the top four teams in the conference standings received first-round byes. Bracketing was identical to that of the SEC women's basketball tournament—note that SEC women's basketball has long been organized in a single league table without divisions.

Since the SEC expanded to 14 schools with the arrival of Missouri and Texas A&M in 2012, the 2013 tournament was the first with a new format. Both men's and women's tournaments have the four bottom seeds (#11 throughout #14) playing opening-round games, with the top four seeds receiving a "double-bye" into the quarterfinals.

=== Divisional format (1993–2011) ===
Before 2012, the top two teams in both the Eastern and Western Divisions received byes in the first round, while #3 in the East played #6 from the West, #4 played #5, etc. Each half of the bracket contained the odd-numbered seeds from one division and the even-numbered seeds from the other division, so that #2 would play the winner of the game involving #3 from the other division, and #1 would play the winner of the game involving #4 from the other division. Barring an upset, the semifinals would pit #1 from one division against #2 from the other division, and the championship game would feature the regular season winners of the two divisions, although this rarely happened in practice.

== History ==
Throughout its history, the SEC tournament championship basketball game has been held at various storied sites, including the Georgia Dome, Mercedes-Benz Superdome, Bridgestone Arena, the BJCC Coliseum, the Pyramid, Rupp Arena, Louisville Gardens, and (in a 2008 emergency relocation) Alexander Memorial Coliseum at Georgia Tech.

From 1933 to 1950, the official SEC Champion was determined by a tournament, except for 1935. Beginning in 1951, a round-robin schedule was introduced and the SEC title was awarded to the team with the highest regular season in-conference winning percentage. From 1951 to 1964, the round-robin consisted of 14 games. In 1965 and 1966, it was expanded to 16 games with the departure of Georgia Tech from the league. From 1967 to 1991, the round-robin schedule was 18 games due to Tulane's departure. Starting with the 1991–1992 season, the SEC split into an Eastern and Western Division and began awarding division championships with the re-expansion to 12 members, but continued to recognize the SEC Champion based on a winning percentage over the new 16-game conference schedule. Divisions would be eliminated starting with the 2011–2012 season. With the addition of Texas A&M and Missouri to the conference, the regular season expanded to an 18 conference game schedule starting with the 2012–13 season.

In 1979, the tournament was renewed with the winner receiving the SEC's automatic bid to the NCAA Tournament, but the official league champion remained the team(s) with the best regular season record.

In 2000, the Arkansas Razorbacks became the first team since the league expansion in 1992 to win the conference tournament by playing all four days, beating Georgia, Kentucky, LSU, and Auburn to receive the conference's automatic bid to the NCAA Basketball Championships. Auburn was the first SEC team to accomplish this feat in 1985 when they defeated Ole Miss, LSU, Florida, and Alabama to win their first SEC tournament. Since then, the feat has been accomplished three times, first in 2008 by Georgia. In 2009, Mississippi State repeated that feat, defeating Georgia, South Carolina, LSU, and Tennessee to receive the conference's automatic bid to the NCAA Basketball Championships. Auburn achieved the feat a second time in 2019, defeating Missouri, South Carolina, Florida and Tennessee.

The first seven games of the 2008 tournament were played at the Georgia Dome. During overtime of Game 7 between Mississippi State and Alabama, a tornado struck the downtown Atlanta area, damaging the Georgia Dome and several buildings surrounding it, including CNN Center. MSU and Alabama returned after a 64-minute delay to finish their game, but the last quarterfinal game of the day, between Georgia and Kentucky, was postponed until the next day, and the remaining four games of the tournament were moved to Alexander Memorial Coliseum at Georgia Tech. Only credentialed individuals were allowed to attend, including players' families, bands, cheerleaders, and media. No other spectators were allowed in the building.

The 2020 tournament was canceled after the first round due to concerns over the spread of COVID-19, after the World Health Organization declared the outbreak a pandemic on 11 March 2020. Initially, a decision was made to play the remaining games without fans in attendance, but as the situation progressed the event was ultimately canceled outright. The conference's NCAA men's basketball tournament auto-bid was awarded to the regular season champion, Kentucky. but ultimately the 2020 NCAA tournament itself would also be cancelled.

=== Tournaments ===
Year	Champion	Score	Runner-up	Tournament MVP	Location
1933	Kentucky	46–27	Mississippi State	None	Atlanta Athletic Club (Atlanta, Georgia)
1934	Alabama	41–25	Florida	None	Atlanta Athletic Club (Atlanta, Georgia)
1935	No tournament				
1936	Tennessee	41–25	Alabama	None	Alumni Memorial Gym (Knoxville, Tennessee)
1937	Kentucky	39–25	Tennessee	None	Alumni Memorial Gym (Knoxville, Tennessee)
1938	Georgia Tech	58–47	Ole Miss	None	Huey Long Field House (Baton Rouge, Louisiana)
1939	Kentucky	46–38	Tennessee	None	Alumni Memorial Gym (Knoxville, Tennessee)
1940	Kentucky	51–43	Georgia	None	Alumni Memorial Gym (Knoxville, Tennessee)
1941	Tennessee	36–33	Kentucky	None	Jefferson County Armory (Louisville, Kentucky)
1942	Kentucky	36–34	Alabama	None	Jefferson County Armory (Louisville, Kentucky)
1943	Tennessee	33–30	Kentucky	None	Jefferson County Armory (Louisville, Kentucky)
1944	Kentucky	62–46	Tulane	None	Jefferson County Armory (Louisville, Kentucky)
1945	Kentucky	39–35	Tennessee	None	Jefferson County Armory (Louisville, Kentucky)
1946	Kentucky	59–36	LSU	None	Jefferson County Armory (Louisville, Kentucky)
1947	Kentucky	55–38	Tulane	None	Jefferson County Armory (Louisville, Kentucky)
1948	Kentucky	54–43	Georgia Tech	None	Jefferson County Armory (Louisville, Kentucky)
1949	Kentucky	68–52	Tulane	None	Jefferson County Armory (Louisville, Kentucky)
1950	Kentucky	95–58	Tennessee	None	Jefferson County Armory (Louisville, Kentucky)
1951	Vanderbilt	61–57	Kentucky	None	Jefferson County Armory (Louisville, Kentucky)
1952	Kentucky	44–43	LSU	None	Jefferson County Armory (Louisville, Kentucky)
1953–1978	No tournament				
1979	Tennessee	75–69^{OT}	Kentucky	Kyle Macy, UK	BJCC Coliseum (Birmingham, Alabama)
1980	LSU	80–78	Kentucky	DeWayne Scales, LSU	BJCC Coliseum (Birmingham, Alabama)
1981	Ole Miss	66–62	Georgia	Dominique Wilkins, UGA	BJCC Coliseum (Birmingham, Alabama)
1982	Alabama	48–46	Kentucky	Dirk Minniefield, UK	Rupp Arena (Lexington, Kentucky)
1983	Georgia	86–71	Alabama	Vern Fleming, UGA	BJCC Coliseum (Birmingham, Alabama)
1984	Kentucky	51–49	Auburn	Charles Barkley, AUB	Memorial Gymnasium (Nashville, Tennessee)
1985	Auburn	53–49^{OT}	Alabama	Chuck Person, AUB	BJCC Coliseum (Birmingham, Alabama)
1986	Kentucky	83–72	Alabama	John Williams, LSU	Rupp Arena (Lexington, Kentucky)
1987	Alabama	69–62	LSU	Derrick McKey, ALA	Omni Coliseum (Atlanta, Georgia)
1988	Kentucky	62–57	Georgia	Rex Chapman, UK	Pete Maravich Assembly Center (Baton Rouge, Louisiana)
1989	Alabama	72–60	Florida	Livingston Chatman, UF	Thompson–Boling Arena (Knoxville, Tennessee)
1990	Alabama	70–51	Ole Miss	Melvin Cheatum, ALA	Orlando Arena (Orlando, Florida)
1991	Alabama	88–69	Tennessee	Allan Houston, UT	Memorial Gymnasium (Nashville, Tennessee)
1992	Kentucky	80–54	Alabama	Jamal Mashburn, UK	BJCC Coliseum (Birmingham, Alabama)
1993	Kentucky	82–65	LSU	Travis Ford, UK	Rupp Arena (Lexington, Kentucky)
1994	Kentucky	73–60	Florida	Travis Ford, UK	The Pyramid (Memphis, Tennessee)
1995	Kentucky	95–93^{OT}	Arkansas	Antoine Walker, UK	Georgia Dome (Atlanta, Georgia)
1996	Mississippi State	84–73	Kentucky	Dontae' Jones, MSU	Louisiana Superdome (New Orleans, Louisiana)
1997	Kentucky	95–68	Georgia	Ron Mercer, UK	The Pyramid (Memphis, Tennessee)
1998	Kentucky	86–56	South Carolina	Wayne Turner, UK	Georgia Dome (Atlanta, Georgia)
1999	Kentucky	76–63	Arkansas	Scott Padgett, UK	Georgia Dome (Atlanta, Georgia)
2000	Arkansas	75–67	Auburn	Brandon Dean, ARK	Georgia Dome (Atlanta, Georgia)
2001	Kentucky	77–55	Ole Miss	Tayshaun Prince, UK	Gaylord Entertainment Center (Nashville, Tennessee)
2002	Mississippi State	61–58	Alabama	Mario Austin, MSU	Georgia Dome (Atlanta, Georgia)
2003	Kentucky	64–57	Mississippi State	Keith Bogans, UK	Louisiana Superdome (New Orleans, Louisiana)
2004	Kentucky	89–73	Florida	Gerald Fitch, UK	Georgia Dome (Atlanta, Georgia)
2005	Florida	70–53	Kentucky	Matt Walsh, UF	Georgia Dome (Atlanta, Georgia)
2006	Florida	49–47	South Carolina	Taurean Green, UF	Gaylord Entertainment Center (Nashville, Tennessee)
2007	Florida	77–56	Arkansas	Al Horford, UF	Georgia Dome (Atlanta, Georgia)
2008	Georgia	66–57	Arkansas	Sundiata Gaines, UGA	Georgia Dome/Alexander Memorial Coliseum (Atlanta, Georgia)
2009	Mississippi State	64–61	Tennessee	Jarvis Varnado, MSU	St. Pete Times Forum (Tampa, Florida)
2010	Kentucky	75–74^{OT}	Mississippi State	John Wall, UK	Bridgestone Arena (Nashville, Tennessee)
2011	Kentucky	70–54	Florida	Darius Miller, UK	Georgia Dome (Atlanta, Georgia)
2012	Vanderbilt	71–64	Kentucky	John Jenkins, VAN	New Orleans Arena (New Orleans, Louisiana)
2013	Ole Miss	66–63	Florida	Marshall Henderson, MISS	Bridgestone Arena (Nashville, Tennessee)
2014	Florida	61–60	Kentucky	Scottie Wilbekin, UF	Georgia Dome (Atlanta, Georgia)
2015	Kentucky	78–63	Arkansas	Willie Cauley-Stein, UK	Bridgestone Arena (Nashville, Tennessee)
2016	Kentucky	82–77^{OT}	Texas A&M	Tyler Ulis, UK	Bridgestone Arena (Nashville, Tennessee)
2017	Kentucky	82–65	Arkansas	De'Aaron Fox, UK	Bridgestone Arena (Nashville, Tennessee)
2018	Kentucky	77–72	Tennessee	Shai Gilgeous-Alexander, UK	Scottrade Center (St. Louis, Missouri)
2019	Auburn	84–64	Tennessee	Bryce Brown, AUB	Bridgestone Arena (Nashville, Tennessee)
2020	Canceled due to the COVID-19 pandemic				
2021	Alabama	80–79	LSU	Jahvon Quinerly, ALA	Bridgestone Arena (Nashville, Tennessee)
2022	Tennessee	65–50	Texas A&M	Kennedy Chandler, UT	Amalie Arena (Tampa, Florida)
2023	Alabama	82–63	Texas A&M	Brandon Miller, ALA	Bridgestone Arena (Nashville, Tennessee)
2024	Auburn	86–67	Florida	Johni Broome, AUB	Bridgestone Arena (Nashville, Tennessee)
2025	Florida	86–77	Tennessee	Walter Clayton Jr., UF	Bridgestone Arena (Nashville, Tennessee)
2026	Arkansas	86–75	Vanderbilt	Darius Acuff, ARK	Bridgestone Arena (Nashville, Tennessee)
2027					Bridgestone Arena (Nashville, Tennessee)
2028					Bridgestone Arena (Nashville, Tennessee)
2029					Bridgestone Arena (Nashville, Tennessee)
2030					Bridgestone Arena (Nashville, Tennessee)

==== Notes ====
Note A: No tournament was held in 1935.
Note B: No tournament was held from 1953 to 1978.
Note C: No MVP Selection made from 1933 to 1952.
Note D: The Tournament was canceled after the first round in 2020. No MVP selection was made.

=== Tournament championships by school ===
School	Championships	Championship Years
Kentucky	31 (Note: The presidents of the Southeastern Conference voted to strip Kentucky of their 1988 regular season and conference tournament championships due to NCAA violations. Note that these games were not vacated by the NCAA; only Kentucky's 1988 NCAA Tournament games were vacated.)	1933, 1937, 1939, 1940, 1942, 1944, 1945, 1946, 1947, 1948, 1949, 1950, 1952, 1984, 1986, 1992, 1993, 1994, 1995, 1997, 1998, 1999, 2001, 2003, 2004, 2010, 2011, 2015, 2016, 2017, 2018
Alabama	8	1934, 1982, 1987, 1989, 1990, 1991, 2021, 2023
Tennessee	5	1936, 1941, 1943, 1979, 2022
Florida	5	2005, 2006, 2007, 2014, 2025
Auburn	3	1985, 2019, 2024
Mississippi State	3	1996, 2002, 2009
Mississippi	2	1981, 2013
Vanderbilt	2	1951, 2012
Georgia	2	1983, 2008
Arkansas	2	2000, 2026
LSU	1	1980
Georgia Tech (Note: Georgia Tech was a member of the SEC from 1932 to 1964)	1	1938
Missouri	0	—
Oklahoma	0	—
Sewanee (Note: Sewanee was a member of the SEC from 1932 to 1940)	0	—
South Carolina	0	—
Texas	0	—
Texas A&M	0	—
Tulane (Note: Tulane was a member of the SEC from 1932 to 1966)	0	—

=== Venues ===
Venue	City	State	Appearances	Last	Years	Notes
Bridgestone Arena	Nashville	Tennessee	13	2026	2001, 2006, 2010, 2013, 2015–17, 2019, 2021, 2023–26	(Note: Bridgestone Arena was known as the Gaylord Entertainment Center when it hosted the 2001 and 2006 tournaments. It was also previously known as Sommet Center and Nashville Arena, but never hosted an SEC Men's Tournament under either name. (It hosted the SEC women's tournament in 2008 as Sommet Center.))
Louisville Gardens	Louisville	Kentucky	12	1952	1941–52	
Georgia Dome	Atlanta	Georgia	11	2014	1995, 1998–2000, 2002, 2004–05, 2007–08, 2011, 2014	(Note: The Georgia Dome hosted the 2008 SEC Tournament, but became uninhabitable after a tornado in downtown Atlanta. The semifinals and finals were played at McCamish Pavilion, then known as Alexander Memorial Coliseum.)
Legacy Arena	Birmingham	Alabama	6	1992	1979–81, 1983, 1985, 1992	(Note: Legacy Arena was known as the BJCC Coliseum (or, more completely, the "Birmingham–Jefferson Convention Complex Coliseum") when it hosted all of its tournaments. It was later known as the BJCC Arena, but did not host an SEC Tournament under that name.)
Alumni Memorial Gym	Knoxville	Tennessee	4	1940	1936–37, 1939–40	
Rupp Arena	Lexington	Kentucky	3	1993	1982, 1986, 1993	
Amalie Arena	Tampa	Florida	2	2022	2009, 2022	(Note: Amalie Arena was known as the St. Pete Times Forum when it hosted the 2009 tournament. It was originally known as the Ice Palace, and was later known as Tampa Bay Times Forum, but never hosted an SEC Tournament under either name.)
Caesars Superdome	New Orleans	Louisiana	2	2003	1996, 2003	(Note: Caesars Superdome was known as the Louisiana Superdome when it hosted the 1996 and 2003 tournaments. It was later known as Mercedes-Benz Superdome, but never hosted an SEC Tournament under that name.)
The Pyramid	Memphis	Tennessee	2	1997	1994, 1997	(Note: "The Pyramid" has never been the official name of this venue, but it has been the standard local name since its opening in 1991. In order, it has officially been known as the Great American Pyramid, Pyramid Arena, and the Memphis Pyramid.)
Memorial Gymnasium	Nashville	Tennessee	2	1991	1984, 1991	
Atlanta Athletic Club	Atlanta	Georgia	2	1934	1933–34	(Note: In the 1930s, the Atlanta Athletic Club owned two properties—a building in downtown Atlanta which hosted the 1933 and 1934 tournaments, and a golf course at the eastern edge of the city. The club sold both properties in 1967 and moved to its current site in what is now Johns Creek, Georgia.)
Enterprise Center	St. Louis	Missouri	1	2018	2018	(Note: The Enterprise Center was known as Scottrade Center when it hosted the 2018 tournament. It was originally known as Kiel Center, and then as Savvis Center, but never hosted an SEC Tournament under either name.)
Smoothie King Center	New Orleans	Louisiana	1	2012	2012	(Note: The Smoothie King Center was known as New Orleans Arena when it hosted the 2012 tournament.)
McCamish Pavilion	Atlanta	Georgia	1	2008	2008	
Orlando Arena	Orlando	Florida	1	1990	1990	
Thompson–Boling Arena	Knoxville	Tennessee	1	1989	1989	
Pete Maravich Assembly Center	Baton Rouge	Louisiana	1	1988	1988	
Huey Long Field House	Baton Rouge	Louisiana	1	1938	1938	
