= Auburn Tigers men's basketball =

Men's basketball program representing Auburn University

2026–27 Auburn Tigers men's basketball team
- University: Auburn University
- First season: 1905–06; 121 years ago
- Athletic director: John Cohen
- Head coach: Steven Pearl; 2nd season, 23–16 (.590)
- Location: Auburn, Alabama
- Arena: Neville Arena (capacity: 9,121)
- NCAA division: Division I
- Conference: SEC
- Nickname: Tigers
- Colors: Burnt orange and navy blue
- Student section: The Jungle
- All-time record: 1,532–1,272–1 (.546)
- NCAA tournament record: 23–14 (.622)

NCAA Division I tournament Final Four
- 2019, 2025
Other NCAA Division I tournament results
Elite Eight	1986, 2019, 2025
Sweet Sixteen	1985, 1986, 1999, 2003, 2019, 2025
Appearances	1984, 1985, 1986, 1987, 1988, 1999, 2000, 2003, 2018, 2019, 2022, 2023, 2024, 2025

NIT champions
- 2026

Conference tournament champions
- SEC: 1985, 2019, 2024

Conference regular-season champions
- SIAA: 1906, 1907, 1908 SoCon: 1928 SEC: 1960, 1999, 2018, 2022, 2025

Conference division champions
- SEC West: 1999

Uniforms
Home	Away	Alternate

The Auburn Tigers men's basketball program is the intercollegiate men's basketball team that represents Auburn University. The school competes in the Southeastern Conference in Division I of the National Collegiate Athletic Association (NCAA). The Tigers play their home games at Neville Arena in Auburn, Alabama on the university campus. The program began in 1906, and is currently coached by Steven Pearl.

Auburn has won six conference regular season championships and three SEC tournament championships. Auburn has appeared in the NCAA tournament 14 times, making it as far as the Final Four in 2019 and 2025. Auburn also won the National Invitation Tournament (NIT) championship in 2026. 14 Auburn players have been named All-Americans and Auburn has had 102 All-SEC selections. Auburn has produced 36 NBA draft picks, including Jabari Smith (2022), who was selected with the third overall pick, the highest in Auburn history. Three Auburn players have been named SEC Player of the Year: Charles Barkley in 1984, Chris Porter in 1999, and Johni Broome in 2025. Auburn has had six head coaches selected as SEC Coach of the Year a total of nine times, and Auburn head coaches Cliff Ellis and Bruce Pearl were named National Coach of the Year by multiple outlets in 1999 and 2025, respectively. Former Auburn player Charles Barkley was inducted into the Naismith Memorial Basketball Hall of Fame in 2006.

== Coaches ==
Auburn has had 20 head men's basketball coaches since the program was started in 1906 by Mike Donahue. The program is currently coached by Steven Pearl.

Auburn Coaching History
Tenure	Coach	Seasons	Won	Lost	Tied	Pct.	Conf.	Conf. Pct.
1905–1921	Donahue	16	74	80	1	.481	–	–
1921–1924	Hutsell	3	16	24	–	.400	–	–
1924–1925	Bunker	1	3	11	–	.214	–	–
1925–1928	Papke	3	38	18	–	.679	–	–
1928–1929	Bohler	1	6	15	–	.286	–	–
1929–1930	Lee	1	1	10	–	.091	–	–
1930–1933	McAllister	3	25	18	–	.581	4–7	.364
1933–42, 1945–46	Jordan	10	95	77	–	.552	61–56	.521
1942–43, 1944–45	Evans	2	4	28	–	.125	3–18	.143
1946–1947	Edney	1	3	18	–	.143	1–15	.063
1947–1949	Doyle	2	21	25	–	.457	12–18	.400
1949–1963	Eaves	14	213	100	–	.681	124–75	.623
1963–1973	Lynn	10	130	124	–	.512	84–88	.488
1973–1978	Davis	5	70	61	–	.534	42–48	.467
1978–1989	Smith	11	173	154	–	.529	84–114	.424
1989–1994	Eagles	5	64	78	–	.451	29–55	.345
1994–2004	Ellis	10	186	125	–	.598	73–87	.456
2004–2010	Lebo	6	96	93	–	.508	35–61	.365
2010–2014	Barbee	4	49	75	–	.395	18–50	.265
2014–2025	B. Pearl	11	232	124	–	.652	115–86	.572
2021 (acting)	Flanigan	–	1	0	–	1.000	–	–
2025–present	S. Pearl	1	23	16	–	.590	7–11	.389
Total		120	1,532	1,272	1	.546	682–789	.464

=== Notable former coaches ===
==== Mike Donahue ====
Mike "Iron Mike" Donahue was Auburn's first head men's basketball coach, starting the program in 1906. He coached the program for 16 seasons, the longest tenure of any men's basketball coach in Auburn history, finishing with a record of 74–80–1 (.481). In addition to coaching basketball, Donahue served as athletic director and coached the football, baseball, track, and soccer teams while at Auburn.

==== Ralph "Shug" Jordan ====
Prior to his tenure as Auburn's head football coach, Ralph "Shug" Jordan coached the Auburn men's basketball program for 10 seasons. Jordan was a football assistant coach when he coached the men's basketball program.

After playing football and basketball for Auburn from 1929 to 1932, Jordan became the head men's basketball coach in 1933. He coached until 1942, when he was called overseas to fight as an officer in World War II. Following his service, Jordan returned to Auburn to coach the 1945–46 team. He left Auburn to become the head men's basketball coach at Georgia after the season. Jordan finished with a record of 95–77 (.552) at Auburn.

==== Joel Eaves ====
Joel Eaves was Auburn's 12th head men's basketball coach, coaching from 1949 to 1963. Eaves was a former Auburn football and basketball player, playing from 1934 to 1937 under head coach "Shug" Jordan.

Auburn won its first ever SEC championship under Eaves in 1960, finishing 12–2 in the conference and 19–3 overall. Eaves was named SEC Coach of the Year following the 1960 season. Eaves finished with a 213–100 (.681) record at Auburn.

Joel Eaves was inducted into the Alabama Sports Hall of Fame in 1978. Auburn's Memorial Coliseum was renamed after Eaves to Joel H. Eaves Memorial Coliseum in 1987, and later to Beard-Eaves-Memorial Coliseum in 1993.

==== Sonny Smith ====
Sonny Smith was the 15th head men's basketball coach at Auburn, coaching for 11 seasons from 1978 to 1989.

Smith coached Auburn to the NCAA tournament in 5 consecutive seasons, 1984 to 1988, including a run to the Elite Eight in 1986 before losing to eventual national champion Louisville. In addition to leading Auburn to its first ever NCAA tournament in 1984, he also coached Auburn to its first SEC tournament championship in 1985. Smith was the first head men's basketball coach in Auburn history to coach three consecutive 20-win seasons, doing so from 1984 to 1986. Sonny Smith was named SEC Coach of the Year in 1984 and 1988.

Smith coached his final season at Auburn in 1989, leaving to become the head men's basketball coach at VCU. Smith finished with a record of 173–154 (.529). Smith was inducted into the Alabama Sports Hall of Fame in 2007.

==== Cliff Ellis ====
Cliff Ellis was the 17th head men's basketball coach at Auburn. He coached for 10 seasons from 1994 to 2004.

Ellis had some success early in his career, leading Auburn to the NIT three times in his first four seasons and being named SEC Coach of the Year in 1995. His most successful season at Auburn was the 1998–99 season, where he led the Tigers to an SEC regular season championship and the program's first ever #1 seed in the NCAA tournament, in which they reached the Sweet Sixteen. Ellis was named both SEC and National Coach of the Year in 1999. Ellis would take Auburn to the NCAA tournament two more times: reaching the Second Round in 2000 and returning to the Sweet Sixteen in 2003.

Ellis was released following the 2003–04 season after finishing the season with a 14–14 record. Auburn faced NCAA sanctions over alleged recruiting violations during the season, but Ellis was not found at fault after the investigation. Ellis finished with a record of 186–125 (.598) at Auburn, trailing only Eaves on the school's all-time wins list.

=== Bruce Pearl ===
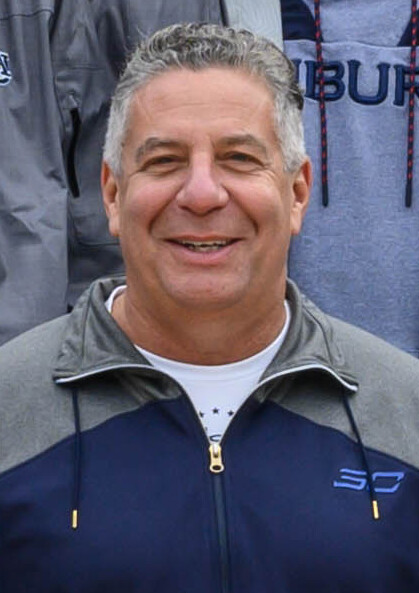
Bruce Pearl

Bruce Pearl became Auburn's 20th head men's basketball coach on March 18, 2014. He led Auburn to its third SEC regular season championship in the 2017–18 season and its second SEC tournament championship in 2019, en route to leading Auburn to its first ever Final Four in the 2019 NCAA tournament. Following another regular season championship in the 2021–22 season, Pearl was selected as SEC Coach of the Year. He again won the SEC tournament championship in 2024. Following winning his third SEC regular season championship in the 2025, Pearl was named SEC Coach of the Year for his second time at Auburn. He then led Auburn to its second Final Four in the 2025 NCAA tournament.

On January 7, 2025, after earning his 214th win at Auburn in an 87–82 win over Texas, Pearl surpassed Joel Eaves to become the winningest coach in Auburn basketball history.

On September 22, 2025, Pearl announced that he was retiring as a head coach and would stay at Auburn as special assistant to the athletic director. Pearl's final record at Auburn was 232–124 (.652).

=== Awards and honors ===
National Coach of the Year

- Cliff Ellis (1999)
- Bruce Pearl (2025)

SEC Coach of the Year

- Joel Eaves (1960)
- Bob Davis (1975)
- Sonny Smith (1984, 1988)
- Tommy Joe Eagles (1990)
- Cliff Ellis (1995, 1999)
- Bruce Pearl (2022, 2025)

Alabama Sports Hall of Fame

- Joel Eaves (1978)
- Sonny Smith (2007)

== Players ==
=== Retired numbers ===
Auburn Tigers retired numbers
No.	Player	Position	Career	No. Ret.	Ref.
11	Wesley Person	SG	1990–1994	2006	
15	John Mengelt	SG	1968–1971	2001	
30	Mike Mitchell	SF	1974–1978	2013	
32	Rex Frederick	F	1956–1959	2006	
34	Charles Barkley	PF	1981–1984	2001	
45	Chuck Person	SF	1982–1986	2006	

=== All-Americans ===
Player	Year(s)	Selectors
Jack Stewart	1931–32	College Humor Magazine
Rex Fredrick	1958–59	Helms Athletic Foundation, Associated Press
Henry Hart	1959–60	Helms Athletic Foundation, Associated Press
Lee DeFore	1965–66	Helms Athletic Foundation
John Mengelt (2)	1969–70, 1970–71	Helms Athletic Foundation, Associated Press
Mike Mitchell	1977–78	Converse Yearbook
Charles Barkley	1983–84	Basketball Times, National Association of Basketball Coaches
Chuck Person (2)	1984–85, 1985–86	Sporting News, McGregor, Basketball Times, National Association of Basketball Coaches
Wesley Person	1993–94	Associated Press, United States Basketball Writers Association
Chris Porter	1998–99	Associated Press, United States Basketball Writers Association, Basketball Times, College Hoops Insider, John Wooden Award
Doc Robinson	1998–99	Associated Press, College Hoops Insider
Jabari Smith	2021–22	Associated Press, Sporting News, United States Basketball Writers Association, National Association of Basketball Coaches
Walker Kessler	2021–22	Associated Press, United States Basketball Writers Association
Johni Broome (2)	2023–24, 2024–25	Associated Press, Sporting News, United States Basketball Writers Association, National Association of Basketball Coaches
Source:"Auburn All-Americas". Auburn Tigers. Archived from the original on 2008-05-28.

=== National awards ===
National Player of the Year

- Johni Broome (2025) - Sporting News

National Freshman of the Year

- Jabari Smith (2022) - NABC, USBWA

National Defensive Player of the Year

- Walker Kessler (2022) - NABC, Naismith

Top at Position

- Johni Broome (2025) - Malone Award, NABC Big Man of the Year

=== Conference awards ===
SEC Player of the Year

- Charles Barkley (1984)
- Chris Porter (1999)
- Johni Broome (2025)

SEC Tournament MVP

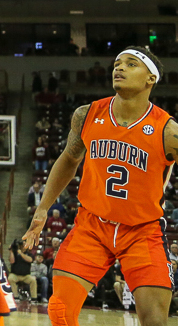
Bryce Brown

- Charles Barkley (1984)
- Chuck Person (1985)
- Bryce Brown (2019)
- Johni Broome (2024)

SEC Rookie of the Year

- Chris Porter (1999)
- Jabari Smith (2022)

SEC Defensive Player of the Year

- Walker Kessler (2022)

=== Other honors ===
Naismith Memorial Basketball Hall of Fame

- Charles Barkley (2006)

National Collegiate Basketball Hall of Fame

- Charles Barkley (2006)

Alabama Sports Hall of Fame

- John Mengelt (1995)
- Charles Barkley (2001)
- Rex Frederick (2003)
- Chuck Person (2005)

USBWA Most Courageous Award

- Wes Flanigan (1997)

=== Auburn in the NBA ===
==== NBA Draft picks ====
Auburn has produced 36 NBA draft picks, including 10 first round picks. The most players selected from Auburn in a single draft was 3 in the 1988 draft. Jabari Smith holds the record for the highest draft pick from Auburn, selected 3rd overall in the 2022 draft.

Year	Round	Pick	Player	Team
1960	12	82	Henry Hart	New York Knicks
1963	4	34	Layton Johns	Los Angeles Lakers
1965	3	21	Joe Newton	Baltimore Bullets
1966	4	31	Lee DeFore	New York Knicks
1971	2	21	John Mengelt	Cincinnati Royals
1972	8	120	Henry Harris	Houston Rockets
1973	3	46	Jim Retseck	Golden State Warriors
1976	5	73	Gary Redding	Portland Trail Blazers
1977	3	49	Eddie Johnson	Atlanta Hawks
1978	1	15	Mike Mitchell	Cleveland Cavaliers
1978	7	133	Stan Pietkiewicz	San Diego Clippers
1979	7	143	Rich Valavicius	Houston Rockets
1980	8	170	Rich Valavicius	Washington Bullets
1981	6	122	Earl Banks	Seattle SuperSonics
1981	8	165	Bobby Cattage	Utah Jazz
1983	2	35	Darrell Lockhart	San Antonio Spurs
1983	10	211	Odell Mosteller	Utah Jazz
1984	1	5	Charles Barkley	Philadelphia 76ers
1984	9	193	Greg Turner	Kansas City Kings
1986	1	4	Chuck Person	Indiana Pacers
1987	6	138	Frank Ford	Los Angeles Lakers
1987	7	158	Gerald White	Dallas Mavericks
1988	1	4	Chris Morris	New Jersey Nets
1988	3	58	Jeff Moore	Charlotte Hornets
1988	3	63	Mike Jones	Milwaukee Bucks
1994	1	23	Wesley Person	Phoenix Suns
2000	1	26	Mamadou N'Diaye	Denver Nuggets
2000	2	55	Chris Porter	Golden State Warriors
2001	2	40	Jamison Brewer	Indiana Pacers
2019	1	16	Chuma Okeke	Orlando Magic
2020	1	5	Isaac Okoro	Cleveland Cavaliers
2021	2	37	JT Thor	Detroit Pistons
2021	2	48	Sharife Cooper	Atlanta Hawks
2022	1	3	Jabari Smith	Houston Rockets
2022	1	22	Walker Kessler	Memphis Grizzlies
2025	2	35	Johni Broome	Philadelphia 76ers

Auburn has had 5 players that transferred to another school before being selected in the NBA draft.

Year	Round	Pick	Player	School	Team
1979	3	49	Cedrick Hordges	South Carolina	Chicago Bulls
1992	2	24	Matt Geiger	Georgia Tech	Miami Heat
1996	2	33	Moochie Norris	West Florida	Milwaukee Bucks
2009	1	29	Toney Douglas	Florida State	Los Angeles Lakers
2021	1	9	Davion Mitchell	Baylor	Sacramento Kings

==== Undrafted free agents ====
In addition to its 30 NBA draft picks, Auburn has produced several undrafted free agents that went on to have NBA careers.

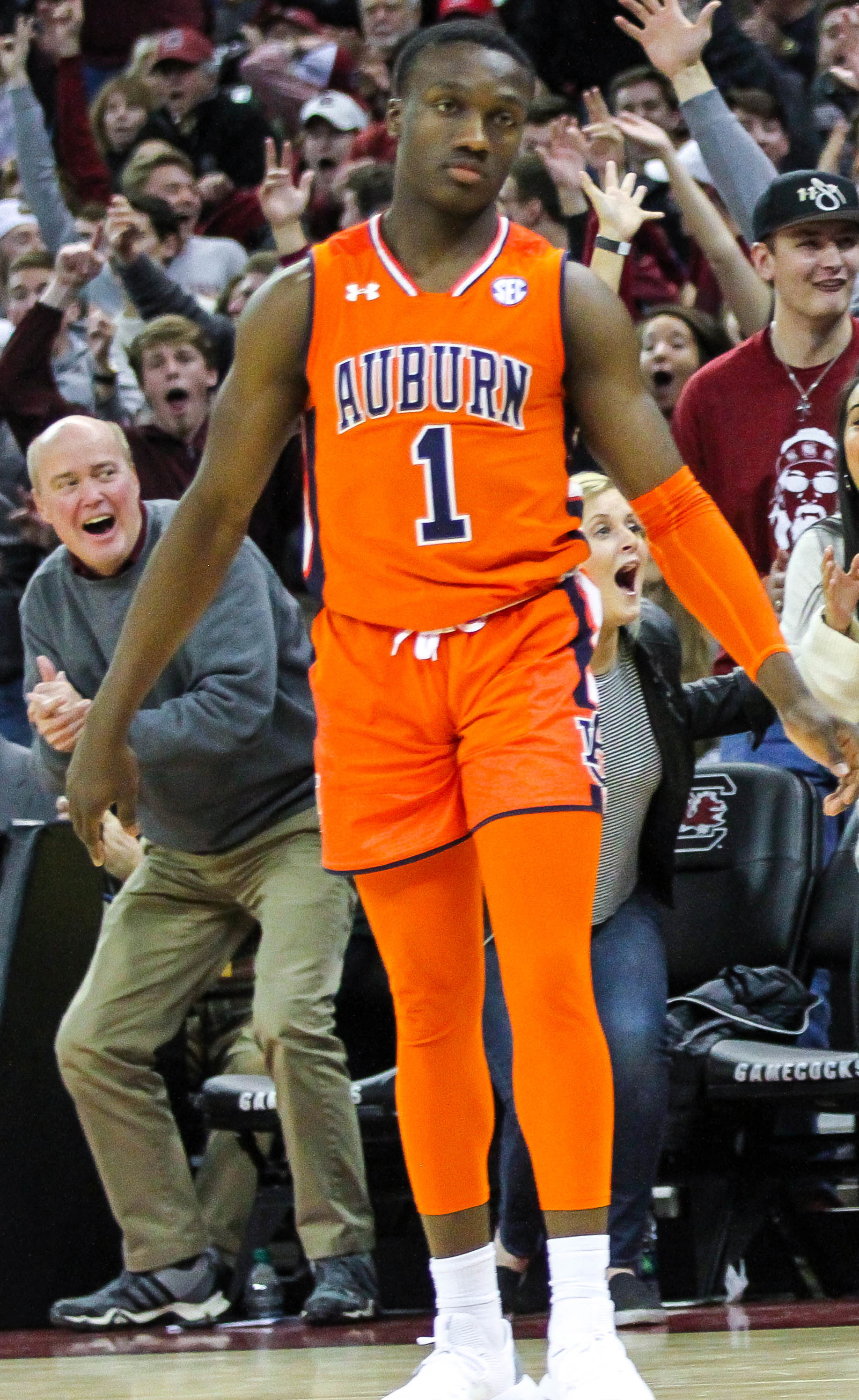
Jared Harper

- Myles Patrick (1980–1981)
- Aaron Swinson (1994)
- Adam Harrington (2002–2003)
- Pat Burke (2002–2003, 2005–2007)
- Marquis Daniels (2003–2013)
- Jared Harper (2019–2022)
- Miles Kelly (2025–present)
- Dylan Cardwell (2025–present)
- Chaney Johnson (2025–present)

==== Awards and honors ====
League MVP

- Charles Barkley (1993)

All-Stars

- Eddie Johnson (1980, 1981)
- Mike Mitchell (1981)
- Charles Barkley (1987, 1988, 1989, 1990, 1991, 1992, 1993, 1994, 1995, 1996, 1997)

Rookie of the Year

- Chuck Person (1987)

All-Rookie First Team

- Charles Barkley (1985)
- Chuck Person (1987)
- Walker Kessler (2023)

All-Rookie Second Team

- Chris Morris (1989)
- Wesley Person (1995)
- Marquis Daniels (2004)
- Isaac Okoro (2021)
- Jabari Smith Jr. (2023)

=== Auburn in the Olympics ===
Year	Player	Medal
1992	Charles Barkley (USA)	Gold
1996	Charles Barkley (USA)	Gold
2024	JT Thor (SUD)	

== Championships and postseason ==
=== Conference regular season championships ===
Auburn has won six regular season conference championships in its history: one Southern Conference championship in 1928 and five Southeastern Conference championships in 1960, 1999, 2018, 2022, and 2025. Auburn also won the SEC West Division championship in 1999.

Year	Conference	Overall record	Conference record	Coach
1928	SoCon	20–2	12–1	Mike Papke
1960	SEC	19–3	12–2	Joel Eaves
1999	SEC	29–4	14–2	Cliff Ellis
2018	SEC	26–8	13–5	Bruce Pearl
2022	SEC	28–6	15–3	Bruce Pearl
2025	SEC	32–6	15–3	Bruce Pearl

=== SEC tournament ===
Auburn has won the SEC tournament three times: in 1985 under coach Sonny Smith and in 2019 and 2024 under Bruce Pearl. The 1985 Auburn Tigers won the tournament after beating Alabama 53–49 in overtime. That 1985 Auburn team was the first ever to win four games in four days to win the SEC Tournament. In 2019, the Tigers earned a bye in the Tournament during the regular season and won games against Missouri, South Carolina, and Florida before crushing Tennessee in the final game 84–64. In 2024, Auburn defeated South Carolina, Mississippi State, and Florida en route to their second tournament title under Bruce Pearl. Auburn has reached the SEC Tournament final two other times: in 1984, where they lost to Kentucky 51–49, and in 2000, where they lost to Arkansas 75–67. Auburn has had four SEC Tournament MVPs: Charles Barkley in 1984, Chuck Person in 1985, Bryce Brown in 2019, and Johni Broome in 2024.

Year	Coach	Result	Site	Overall record	SEC record
1985	Sonny Smith	Auburn 53, Alabama 49	Birmingham-Jefferson Civic Center, Birmingham, AL	22–12	8–10
2019	Bruce Pearl	Auburn 84, Tennessee 64	Bridgestone Arena, Nashville, TN	30–10	11–7
2024	Bruce Pearl	Auburn 86, Florida 67	Bridgestone Arena, Nashville, TN	27–8	13–5

=== NCAA tournament ===
Auburn has appeared in the NCAA tournament 14 times. Their combined record is 23–14 with two appearances in the Final Four in 2019 and 2025.

Year	Seed	Region	Round	Location	Opponent	Result
1984	#5	East	First Round	Charlotte, NC	#12 Richmond	L 71–72
1985	#11	Mideast	First Round; Second Round; Sweet Sixteen	South Bend, IN; South Bend, IN; Birmingham, AL	#6 Purdue #3 Kansas #2 North Carolina	W 59–58; W 66–64; L 56–62
1986	#8	West	First Round; Second Round; Sweet Sixteen; Elite Eight	Long Beach, CA; Long Beach, CA; Houston, TX; Houston, TX	#9 Arizona #1 St. John's #4 UNLV #2 Louisville	W 73–63; W 81–65; W 70–63; L 76–84
1987	#8	Midwest	First Round; Second Round	Indianapolis, IN; Indianapolis, IN	#9 San Diego #1 Indiana	W 62–61; L 90–107
1988	#8	Southeast	First Round; Second Round	Atlanta, GA; Atlanta, GA	#9 Bradley #1 Oklahoma	W 90–86; L 87–107
1999	#1	South	First Round; Second Round; Sweet Sixteen	Indianapolis, IN; Indianapolis, IN; Knoxville, TN	#16 Winthrop #9 Oklahoma State #4 Ohio State	W 80–41; W 81–74; L 64–72
2000	#7	Midwest	First Round; Second Round	Minneapolis, MN; Minneapolis, MN	#10 Creighton #2 Iowa State	W 72–69; L 60–79
2003	#10	East	First Round; Second Round; Sweet Sixteen	Tampa, FL; Tampa, FL; Albany, NY	#7 Saint Joseph's #2 Wake Forest #3 Syracuse	W 65–63^{OT} W 68–62; L 78–79
2018	#4	Midwest	First Round; Second Round	San Diego, CA; San Diego, CA	#13 Charleston #5 Clemson	W 62–58; L 53–84
2019	#5	Midwest	First Round; Second Round; Sweet Sixteen; Elite Eight; Final Four	Salt Lake City, UT; Salt Lake City, UT; Kansas City, MO; Kansas City, MO; Minneapolis, MN	#12 New Mexico State #4 Kansas #1 North Carolina #2 Kentucky #1 Virginia	W 78–77; W 89–75; W 97–80; W 77–71^{OT} L 62–63
2022	#2	Midwest	First Round; Second Round	Greenville, SC; Greenville, SC	#15 Jacksonville State #10 Miami (FL)	W 80–61; L 61–79
2023	#9	Midwest	First Round; Second Round	Birmingham, AL; Birmingham, AL	#8 Iowa #1 Houston	W 83–75; L 64–81
2024	#4	East	First Round	Spokane, WA	#13 Yale	L 76–78
2025	#1	South	First Round; Second Round; Sweet Sixteen; Elite Eight; Final Four	Lexington, KY; Lexington, KY; Atlanta, GA; Atlanta, GA; San Antonio, TX	#16 Alabama State #9 Creighton #5 Michigan #2 Michigan State #1 Florida	W 83–63; W 82–70; W 78–65; W 70–64; L 73–79

=== NIT ===
Auburn has appeared in the National Invitation Tournament (NIT) 7 times. Their combined record is 9–6. Auburn won the 2026 NIT Championship.

Year	Seed	Round	Location	Opponent	Result
1993	–	First Round	Clemson, SC	Clemson	L 72–84
1995	–	First Round	Auburn, AL	Marquette	L 61–68
1996	–	First Round	Auburn, AL	Tulane	L 73–87^{OT}
1998	–	First Round; Second Round	Auburn, AL; Milwaukee, WI	Southern Miss; Marquette	W 77–62; L 60–75^{OT}
2001	–	First Round; Second Round	Auburn, AL; West Lafayette, IN	Miami (FL); Purdue	W 60–58; L 60–90
2009	1	First Round; Second Round; Quarterfinals	Auburn, AL; Auburn, AL; Auburn, AL	8 UT Martin; 4 Tulsa; 3 Baylor	W 87–82; W 74–55; L 72–74
2026	1	First Round; Second Round; Quarterfinals; Semifinals; Championship	Auburn, AL; Auburn, AL; Auburn, AL; Indianapolis, IN; Indianapolis, IN	South Alabama; 4 Seattle; 2 Nevada; 4 Illinois State; 1 Tulsa	W 78–67; W 91–85; W 75–69; W 88–66; W 92–86 ^{OT}

== Facilities ==
=== Former facilities ===
==== Alumni Gymnasium ====
Auburn's first on-campus basketball facility was Alumni Gymnasium, which opened in February 1916. Auburn played its home games in Alumni Gymnasium until Auburn Sports Arena was opened in 1946.

==== Auburn Sports Arena ====
Auburn Sports Arena was a 2,500 seat multi-purpose arena. Nicknamed "The Barn," it opened in 1946. It was replaced when Beard-Eaves-Memorial Coliseum opened in 1969. Auburn Sports Arena stood until September 21, 1996, when it caught fire and burned down in the middle of a football game between Auburn and LSU.

==== Beard–Eaves–Memorial Coliseum ====
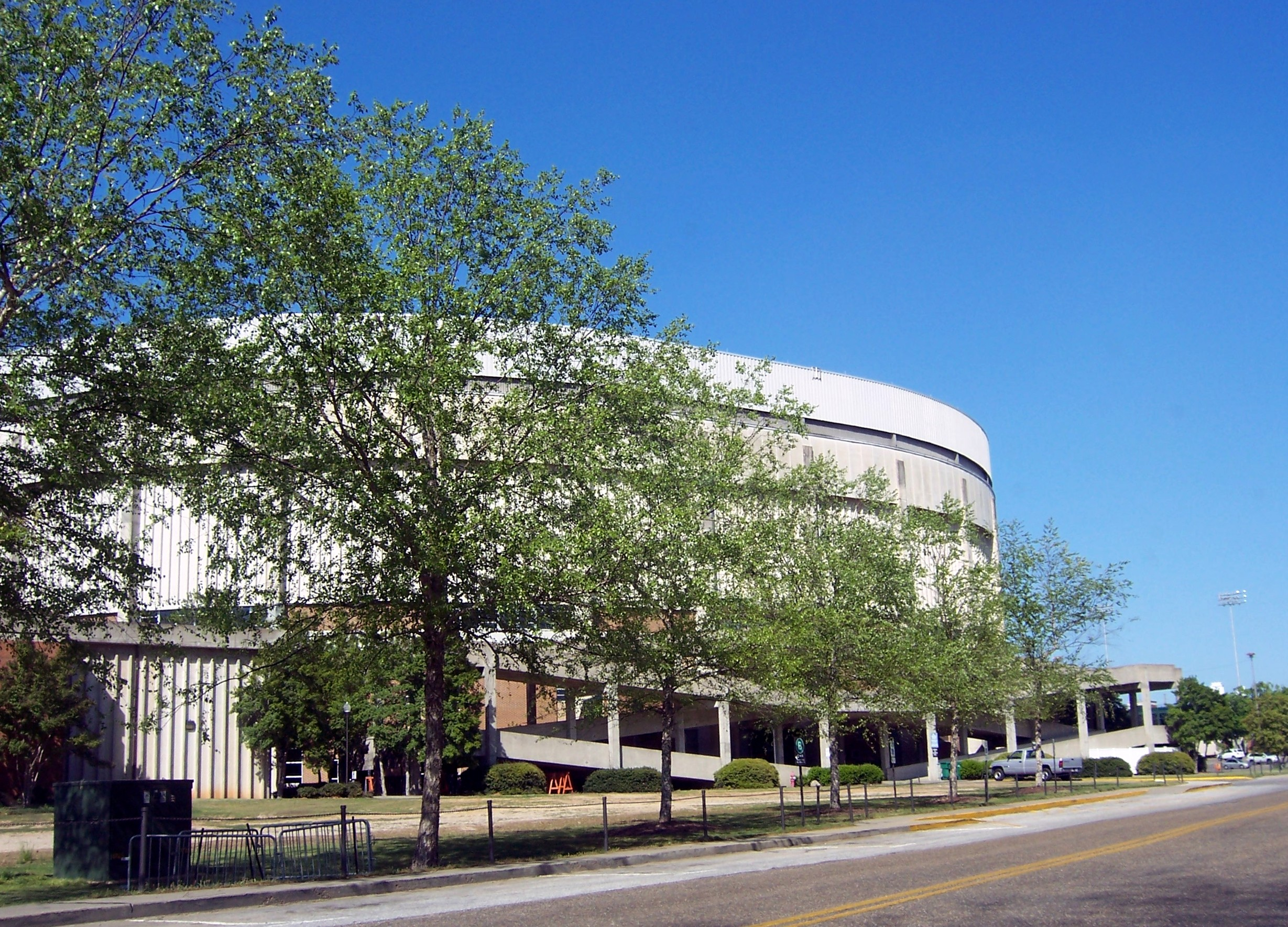

Beard–Eaves–Memorial Coliseum is a 10,500-seat multipurpose arena that opened in 1969 under the name Memorial Coliseum. It was renamed after former player and coach Joel Eaves to Joel H. Eaves Memorial Coliseum in 1987. It was renamed for the final time to Beard-Eaves-Memorial Coliseum in 1993, adding the name of former Auburn athletic director Jeff Beard.

Auburn boasted a 393–182 (.683) overall record at Beard–Eaves–Memorial Coliseum. Auburn had a winning record at home in 37 of the 42 seasons Auburn played in the Coliseum. Auburn's 30-game home winning streak from the 1997–98 season to the final game of the 1999–2000 season was the longest in Coliseum history. It was the nation's second longest current winning streak at the time and is the second longest home winning streak in Auburn history.

Auburn played its final season in Beard–Eaves–Memorial Coliseum in the 2009–10 season. Auburn's final game in Beard–Eaves–Memorial Coliseum was on March 3, 2010; Auburn beat Mississippi State 89–80.

=== Neville Arena ===
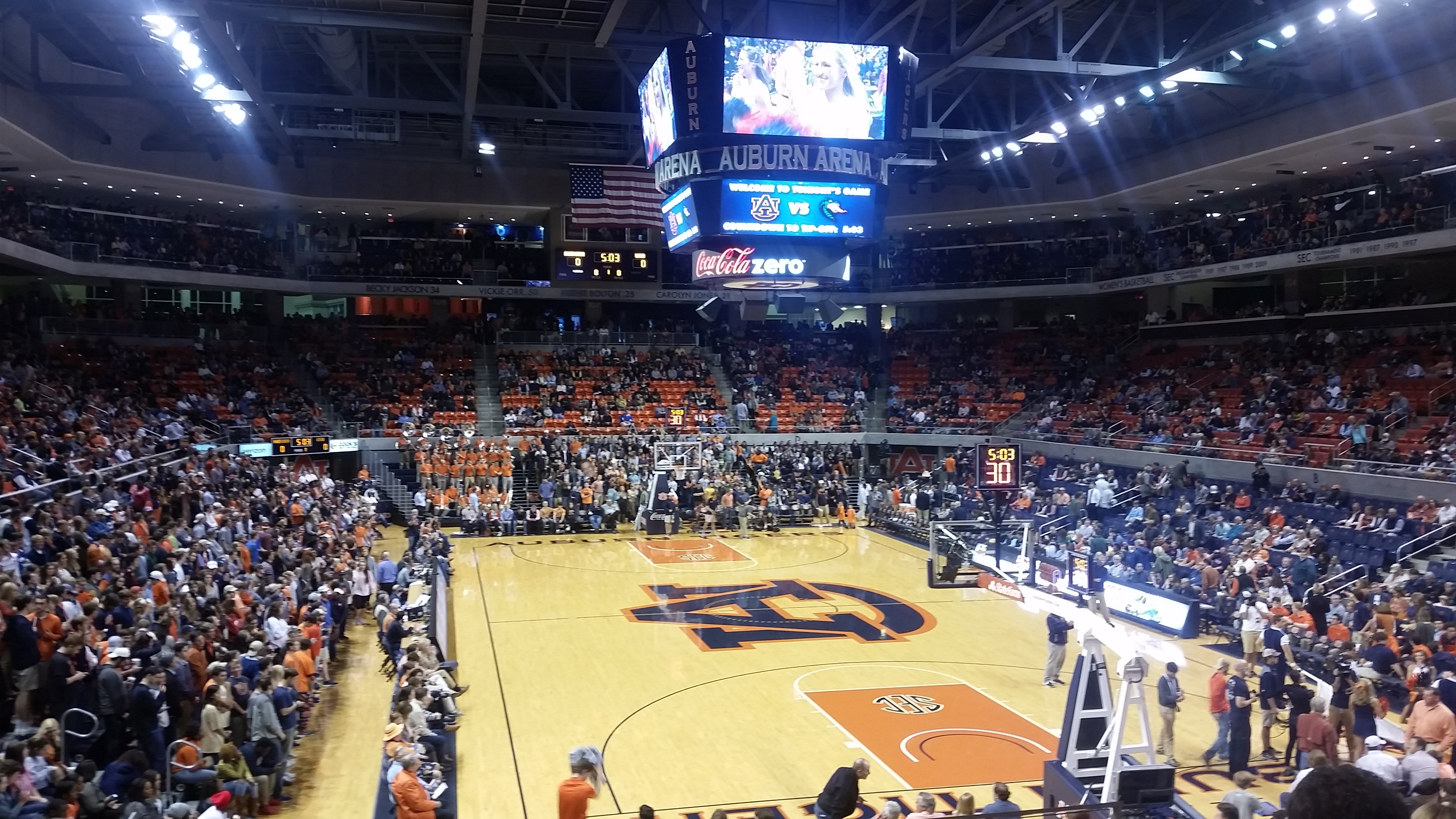
Neville Arena (then Auburn Arena) before the Auburn-UAB men's basketball game on November 13, 2015.

On June 29, 2007, Auburn announced plans to build a new $92.5 million basketball arena and practice facilities that would eventually be completed for the 2010–11 season. The arena was initially named Auburn Arena, but later renamed to Neville Arena in 2022. With a seating capacity of 9,121, Neville Arena is the smallest men's basketball arena in the SEC. Aside from the main court, the arena also contains two practice courts, a weight room, 12 suites, coaches offices, the Auburn Ticket Office, and the Lovelace Athletic Museum.

Auburn played its first game in Auburn Arena on November 12, 2010, losing to UNC Asheville in overtime 70–69. Auburn's first win in Auburn Arena came on November 21, 2010, when Auburn beat Middle Tennessee 68–66. Auburn currently holds a 175–64 (.732) record in Neville Arena.

== Traditions ==
=== Rivalries ===
==== Alabama ====
Sometimes referred to as the "Iron Bowl of Basketball," Auburn and Alabama have a fierce rivalry that dates back to 1924. Auburn and Alabama first met in the Southern Conference Tournament on March 1, 1924, and Auburn lost 19–40. The two programs did not meet again until 1941 in the SEC tournament, a matchup that Auburn lost again 16–38. The programs have played regularly since 1948, meeting at least twice every season starting in 1949. Auburn's first win in the rivalry came in their sixth meeting on December 20, 1949, when Auburn beat Alabama 45–40.

Auburn and Alabama have met in the SEC Tournament 9 times, including Auburn's 53–49 overtime victory over Alabama in the 1985 SEC Tournament championship game. Alabama leads the all-time series 103–69.

==== Georgia ====
Georgia is Auburn's oldest rival, first meeting in 1908 in Columbus, GA. Auburn won that game 34–20. Auburn and Georgia have played at least once every year since 1945. Auburn leads the all-time series 104–97.

==== UAB ====
Though Auburn and UAB have met just 21 times, the two programs have a strong history. The first game between the two schools was played on November 26, 1982, a matchup won by Auburn, 63–61. The programs met 16 more times over the next two decades until the series was discontinued after the 1999–2000 season. In 2015, Auburn and UAB agreed to a four-game series that reignited the rivalry. Auburn leads the all-time series 11–10.

=== Student section ===
Auburn's student section is known as The Jungle. Auburn held a vote to name their student section at the start of the 2011–12 season, and The Jungle was chosen from several options. Auburn officially started The Jungle on January 11, 2012, for the Auburn–Kentucky game. The Jungle was awarded the Sixth Man Award at the 2012 team banquet for its "outstanding support throughout the season and making Auburn Arena one of the loudest venues in the SEC."

The Auburn student section was previously known as Lebo's Lunatics during Jeff Lebo's tenure at Auburn and the Cliff Dwellers during Cliff Ellis' tenure.
