= 1984–85 Penn Quakers men's basketball team =

American college basketball season

1984–85 Penn Quakers men's basketball

Ivy League champions

NCAA tournament, First Round
- Conference: Ivy League
- Record: 13–14 (10–4 Ivy)
- Head coach: Craig Littlepage (3rd season)
- Home arena: The Palestra

1984–85 Ivy League men's basketball standings
	Conf.				Overall
Team	W		L	PCT	W		L	PCT
Penn	10	–	4	.714	13	–	14	.481
Columbia	9	–	5	.643	13	–	13	.500
Cornell	8	–	6	.571	14	–	12	.538
Harvard	7	–	7	.500	15	–	9	.625
Yale	7	–	7	.500	14	–	12	.538
Princeton	7	–	7	.500	11	–	15	.423
Brown	5	–	9	.357	9	–	18	.333
Dartmouth	3	–	11	.214	5	–	21	.192
Rankings from AP Poll

The 1984–85 Penn Quakers men's basketball team represented the University of Pennsylvania during the 1984–85 NCAA Division I men's basketball season. The Quakers, led by 3rd-year head coach Craig Littlepage, played their home games at The Palestra as members of the Ivy League. They finished the season 13–14, 10–4 in Ivy League play to win the conference championship. They received the Ivy League's automatic bid to the NCAA tournament where they lost in the First Round to No. 2 seed and eventual Final Four participant Memphis State.

== Roster ==
1984–85 Penn Quakers men's basketball team
Players
Coaches

Pos.	#	Name	Height	Weight	Year	Previous school	Hometown
G	4	Perry Bromwell	6 ft 2 in (1.88 m)	—	So	Manhattan
F/C	24	Bruce Lefkowitz	6 ft 8 in (2.03 m)	—	Sr		Scarsdale, New York

Head coach

- Craig Littlepage (Penn)

Assistant coach(es)

Legend

- (C) Team captain
- (S) Suspended
- (I) Ineligible
- (W) Walk-on
- Injured
- Current redshirt

Roster

== Schedule and results ==
Date time, TV	Rank^{#}	Opponent^{#}	Result	Record	Site (attendance) city, state
Regular season
Dec 1, 1984*		at Illinois-Chicago	L 71–76	0–1	UIC Pavilion; Chicago, Illinois
Dec 8, 1984*		Temple	L 57–70	0–2	The Palestra; Philadelphia, Pennsylvania
Dec 11, 1984*		at Niagara	L 73–79	0–3	Buffalo Memorial Auditorium; Lewiston, New York
Dec 15, 1984*		Villanova	L 67–80	0–4	The Palestra; Philadelphia, Pennsylvania
Dec 22, 1984*		at Saint Joseph's	L 57–59	0–5	Hagan Arena; Philadelphia, Pennsylvania
Dec 27, 1984*		vs. Oregon State; Far West Classic	L 58–80	0–6	Portland, Oregon
Dec 28, 1984*		vs. Murray State; Far West Classic	L 54–66	0–7	Portland, Oregon
Dec 29, 1984*		vs. Davidson; Far West Classic	W 81–80	1–7	Portland, Oregon
Jan 11, 1985		Dartmouth	W 83–59	2–7 (1–0)	The Palestra; Philadelphia, Pennsylvania
Jan 12, 1985		Harvard	L 75–77	2–8 (1–1)	The Palestra; Philadelphia, Pennsylvania
Jan 15, 1985*		Virginia	L 50–60	2–9	The Palestra; Philadelphia, Pennsylvania
Jan 23, 1985*		American	W 86–71	3–9	The Palestra; Philadelphia, Pennsylvania
Jan 26, 1985*		at Hartford	W 59–57	4–9	Hartford Civic Center; Hartford, Connecticut
Jan 29, 1985*		La Salle	L 74–77	4–10	The Palestra; Philadelphia, Pennsylvania
Feb 2, 1985		Princeton	L 47–49	4–11 (1–2)	The Palestra; Philadelphia, Pennsylvania
Feb 8, 1985		Columbia	W 71–51	5–11 (2–2)	The Palestra; Philadelphia, Pennsylvania
Feb 9, 1985		Cornell	W 48–47	6–11 (3–2)	The Palestra; Philadelphia, Pennsylvania
Feb 15, 1985		at Brown	W 79–72	7–11 (4–2)	Marvel Gymnasium; Providence, Rhode Island
Feb 16, 1985		at Yale	L 75–77	7–12 (4–3)	Payne Whitney Gymnasium; New Haven, Connecticut
Feb 22, 1985		at Harvard	W 53–51	8–12 (5–3)	Lavietes Pavilion; Cambridge, Massachusetts
Feb 23, 1985		at Dartmouth	W 98–76	9–12 (6–3)	Alumni Gym; Hanover, New Hampshire
Feb 26, 1985		Princeton	W 59–49	10–12 (7–3)	The Palestra; Philadelphia, Pennsylvania
Mar 1, 1985		Yale	W 72–66	11–12 (8–3)	The Palestra; Philadelphia, Pennsylvania
Mar 2, 1985		Brown	W 91–79	12–12 (9–3)	The Palestra; Philadelphia, Pennsylvania
Mar 8, 1985		at Cornell	W 74–71	13–12 (10–3)	Barton Hall; Ithaca, New York
Mar 9, 1985		at Columbia	L 65–70	13–13 (10–4)	Levien Gymnasium; New York, New York
NCAA Tournament
Mar 15, 1985*	(15 MW)	vs. (2 MW) No. 5 Memphis State; First round	L 55–67	13–14	Hofheinz Pavilion; Houston, Texas
*Non-conference game. ^{#}Rankings from AP Poll. (#) Tournament seedings in parentheses. MW=Midwest. All times are in Eastern Time.
