= 1984–85 Georgia Bulldogs basketball team =

American college basketball season

1984–85 Georgia Bulldogs basketball

NCAA tournament, Second round
- Conference: Southeastern Conference

Ranking
- AP: No. 19
- Record: 22–9 (12–6 SEC)
- Head coach: Hugh Durham (7th season)
- Assistant coaches: Don Beasley; Larry Gay; Joe Cunningham
- Home arena: Stegeman Coliseum

1984–85 Southeastern Conference men's basketball standings
	Conf.				Overall
Team	W		L	PCT	W		L	PCT
No. 20 LSU	13	–	5	.722	19	–	10	.655
No. 19 Georgia	12	–	6	.667	22	–	9	.710
Alabama	11	–	7	.611	23	–	10	.697
Kentucky	11	–	7	.611	18	–	13	.581
Florida	9	–	9	.500	18	–	12	.600
Mississippi State	9	–	9	.500	13	–	15	.464
Tennessee	8	–	10	.444	22	–	15	.595
Auburn †	8	–	10	.444	22	–	12	.647
Ole Miss	5	–	13	.278	11	–	17	.393
Vanderbilt	4	–	14	.222	11	–	17	.393
† 1985 SEC tournament winner Rankings from AP poll

The 1984–85 Georgia Bulldogs basketball team represented the University of Georgia as a member of the Southeastern Conference during the 1984–85 NCAA men's basketball season. The team was led by head coach Hugh Durham, and played their home games at Stegeman Coliseum in Athens, Georgia. The Bulldogs finished second in the SEC regular season standings, and received an at-large bid to the NCAA tournament as No. 6 seed in the East region. They defeated No. 11 seed Wichita State in the opening round before losing to No. 3 seed Illinois in the round of 32 to finish the season at 22–9 (12–6 SEC).

== Roster ==
1984–85 Georgia Bulldogs men's basketball team
Players
Coaches

Pos.	#	Name	Height	Weight	Year	Hometown
F		Cedric Henderson	6 ft 8 in (2.03 m)	200 lb (91 kg)	Fr	Marietta, Georgia
F	32	Joe Ward	6 ft 6 in (1.98 m)	205 lb (93 kg)	Jr	Barnesville, Georgia
F	40	Willie Anderson	6 ft 7 in (2.01 m)	185 lb (84 kg)	Fr	Atlanta, Georgia

Head coach

- Hugh Durham (Florida State)

Assistant coach(es)

- Don Beasley (Northwestern State)
- Larry Gay (Florida State)
- Joe Cunningham

Legend

- (C) Team captain
- (S) Suspended
- (I) Ineligible
- (W) Walk-on
- Injured
- Current redshirt

== Schedule and results ==
Date time, TV	Rank^{#}	Opponent^{#}	Result	Record	Site city, state
Non-conference Regular season
Dec 1, 1984*		at Michigan	L 57–63	0–1	Crisler Arena; Ann Arbor, Michigan
Dec 11, 1984*		at No. 12 Georgia Tech	W 60–59	1–1	Alexander Memorial Coliseum; Atlanta, Georgia
Dec 15, 1984*		Georgia State	W 89–53	2–1	Stegeman Coliseum; Athens, Georgia
Dec 17, 1984*		Charleston Southern	W 85–48	3–1	Stegeman Coliseum; Athens, Georgia
Dec 22, 1984*		Robert Morris	W 99–62	4–1	Stegeman Coliseum; Athens, Georgia
Dec 28, 1984*		vs. Yale; Cotton State-Kiwanis Classic	W 105–65	5–1	The Omni; Atlanta, Georgia
Dec 29, 1984*		vs. Villanova; Cotton State-Kiwanis Classic	W 75–68	6–1	The Omni; Atlanta, Georgia
SEC Regular season
Jan 2, 1985		No. 14 LSU	L 74–79	6–2 (0–1)	Stegeman Coliseum; Athens, Georgia
Jan 5, 1985		at Alabama	L 74–87	6–3 (0–2)	Coleman Coliseum; Tuscaloosa, Alabama
Jan 9, 1985		at Mississippi State	L 64–65	6–4 (0–3)	Humphrey Coliseum; Starkville, Mississippi
Jan 12, 1985		Vanderbilt	W 80–73	7–4 (1–3)	Stegeman Coliseum; Athens, Georgia
Jan 16, 1985		at Florida	W 71–60	8–4 (2–3)	Stephen C. O'Connell Center; Gainesville, Florida
Jan 19, 1985		Auburn	W 97–80	9–4 (3–3)	Stegeman Coliseum; Athens, Georgia
Jan 23, 1985		Kentucky	W 81–73	10–4 (4–3)	Stegeman Coliseum; Athens, Georgia
Mar 2, 1985	No. 17	at Tennessee	L 85–86	20–7 (12–6)	Stokely Athletic Center; Knoxville, Tennessee
SEC Tournament
Mar 7, 1985*	No. 17	vs. Tennessee; Quarterfinals	W 67–61	21–7	Birmingham-Jefferson Civic Center; Birmingham, Alabama
Mar 8, 1985*	No. 17	at Alabama; Semifinals	L 53–74	21–8	Birmingham-Jefferson Civic Center; Birmingham, Alabama
NCAA Tournament
Mar 15, 1985*	(6 E) No. 19	vs. (11 E) Wichita State; First round	W 67–59	22–8	The Omni; Atlanta, Georgia
Mar 17, 1985*	(6 E) No. 19	vs. (3 E) No. 12 Illinois; Second round	L 58–74	22–9	The Omni (16,723); Atlanta, Georgia
*Non-conference game. ^{#}Rankings from AP Poll. (#) Tournament seedings in parentheses. E=East. All times are in Eastern Time.
