= 1984–85 Yale Bulldogs men's basketball team =

American college basketball season

1984–85 Yale Bulldogs men's basketball
- Conference: Ivy League
- Record: 14–12 (7–7 Ivy)
- Head coach: Tom Brennan (3rd season)
- Assistant coaches: Mike Mucci; Larry Mangino
- Captain: Chris Kelly
- Home arena: John J. Lee Amphitheater

1984–85 Ivy League men's basketball standings
	Conf.				Overall
Team	W		L	PCT	W		L	PCT
Penn	10	–	4	.714	13	–	14	.481
Columbia	9	–	5	.643	13	–	13	.500
Cornell	8	–	6	.571	14	–	12	.538
Harvard	7	–	7	.500	15	–	9	.625
Yale	7	–	7	.500	14	–	12	.538
Princeton	7	–	7	.500	11	–	15	.423
Brown	5	–	9	.357	9	–	18	.333
Dartmouth	3	–	11	.214	5	–	21	.192
Rankings from AP Poll

The 1984–85 Yale Bulldogs men's basketball team represented Yale University during the 1984–85 men's college basketball season. The Bulldogs, led by 3rd year head coach Tom Brennan, played their home games at John J. Lee Amphitheater of the Payne Whitney Gymnasium and were members of the Ivy League. They finished the season 14–12, 7–7 in Ivy League play to finish in fifth place.

== Roster ==
1984–85 Yale Bulldogs men's basketball team
Players
Coaches

Pos.	#	Name	Height	Weight	Year	Hometown
F	4	Chris Kelly	6 ft 7 in (2.01 m)	200 lb (91 kg)	Sr	Patterson, New York
F	5	Byron Taylor	6 ft 5 in (1.96 m)	200 lb (91 kg)	So	Youngstown, Ohio
G	10	Val Carlotti	5 ft 10 in (1.78 m)	157 lb (71 kg)	Fr	Bronx, New York
G/F	11	Ken Wheeler	6 ft 2 in (1.88 m)	160 lb (73 kg)	So	Springfield Gardens, New York
G	12	Peter White	5 ft 11 in (1.8 m)	155 lb (70 kg)	Fr	Williamsport, Pennsylvania
G	14	John Rice	6 ft 3 in (1.91 m)	175 lb (79 kg)	Fr	Washington, D.C.
C	15	Chris Dudley	6 ft 10 in (2.08 m)	215 lb (98 kg)	So	Solana Beach, California
F	21	Eric Mitchell	6 ft 6 in (1.98 m)	203 lb (92 kg)	Fr	Chevy Chase, Maryland
F	22	Jeb Boasberg	6 ft 6 in (1.98 m)	205 lb (93 kg)	Sr	Washington, D.C.
G	23	Brian Fitzpatrick	6 ft 7 in (2.01 m)	185 lb (84 kg)	Fr	Irvington, New York
F	24	Paul Maley	6 ft 7 in (2.01 m)	200 lb (91 kg)	Fr	Los Alamos, New Mexico
F/C	32	Chad Ludington	6 ft 8 in (2.03 m)	215 lb (98 kg)	So	Chapel Hill, North Carolina
G/F	34	Matt Whitehead	6 ft 3 in (1.91 m)	185 lb (84 kg)	Fr	Stamford, Connecticut
G	40	Mike Denzel	6 ft 2 in (1.88 m)	170 lb (77 kg)	So	Park Ridge, Illinois
F	44	Brian Kasbar	6 ft 7 in (2.01 m)	240 lb (109 kg)	Fr	Summit, New Jersey

Head coach

- Tom Brennan

Assistant coach(es)

- Mike Mucci
- Larry Mangino

Legend

- (C) Team captain
- (S) Suspended
- (I) Ineligible
- (W) Walk-on
- Injured
- Current redshirt

Roster

== Schedule ==
Date time, TV	Rank^{#}	Opponent^{#}	Result	Record	Site city, state
November 30*		at Vanderbilt	L 72–87	0–1	Memorial Gymnasium; Nashville, Tennessee
December 4*		Connecticut	L 77–95	0–2	Payne Whitney Gymnasium; New Haven, CT
December 8		Dartmouth	W 81–76	1–2 (1–0)	Payne Whitney Gymnasium; New Haven, CT
December 10*		Clark	W 110–64	2–2 (1–0)	Payne Whitney Gymnasium; New Haven, CT
December 28*		vs. Georgia	L 65–105	2–3 (1–0)	
December 29*		vs. BYU	L 58–73	2–4 (1–0)	
January 3*		at Holy Cross	W 59–55	3–4 (1–0)	Hart Recreation Center; Worcester, Massachusetts
January 5*		at Vermont	W 73–59	4–4 (1–0)	Roy L. Patrick Gymnasium
January 7*		Case Western	W 79–64	5–4 (1–0)	Payne Whitney Gymnasium; New Haven, CT
January 10*		Trinty	W 58–49 ^{OT}	6–4 (1–0)	Payne Whitney Gymnasium; New Haven, CT
January 12*		New Hampshire	W 65–63	7–4 (1–0)	Payne Whitney Gymnasium; New Haven, CT
January 15		Brown	W 83–82	8–4 (2–0)	Payne Whitney Gymnasium; New Haven, CT
January 24*		at Army	L 63–79	8–5 (2–0)	USMA Fieldhouse; West Point, NY
January 26		at Brown	L 76–82	8–6 (2–1)	Marvel Gymnasium; Providence, RI
January 29*		Manhattan	W 60–57	9–6 (2–1)	Payne Whitney Gymnasium; New Haven, CT
February 1		at Columbia	L 67–77	9–7 (2–2)	Levien Gymnasium; Morningside Heights, Manhattan
February 2		at Cornell	L 55–78	9–8 (2–3)	Barton Hall; Ithaca, NY
February 8		at Harvard	L 71–75	9–9 (2–4)	Malkin Athletic Center; Cambridge, Massachusetts
February 9		at Dartmouth	L 73–87	9–10 (2–5)	Alumni Gymnasium; Hanover, NH
February 15		Princeton	W 48–46	10–10 (3–5)	Payne Whitney Gymnasium; New Haven, CT
February 16		Penn	W 77–75	11–10 (4–5)	Payne Whitney Gymnasium; New Haven, CT
February 22		Cornell	W 75–61	12–10 (5–5)	Payne Whitney Gymnasium; New Haven, CT
February 23		Columbia	W 55–52	13–10 (6–5)	Payne Whitney Gymnasium; New Haven, CT
March 1		at Penn	L 66–72	13–11 (6–6)	The Palestra; Philadelphia, Pennsylvania
March 2		at Princeton	L 61–65	13–12 (6–7)	Jadwin Gymnasium; Princeton, NJ
March 9		Harvard	W 70–69	14–12 (7–7)	Jadwin Gymnasium; Princeton, NJ
*Non-conference game. ^{#}Rankings from AP Poll. (#) Tournament seedings in parentheses.
