= Bryce Brown (basketball) =

American basketball player (born 1997)

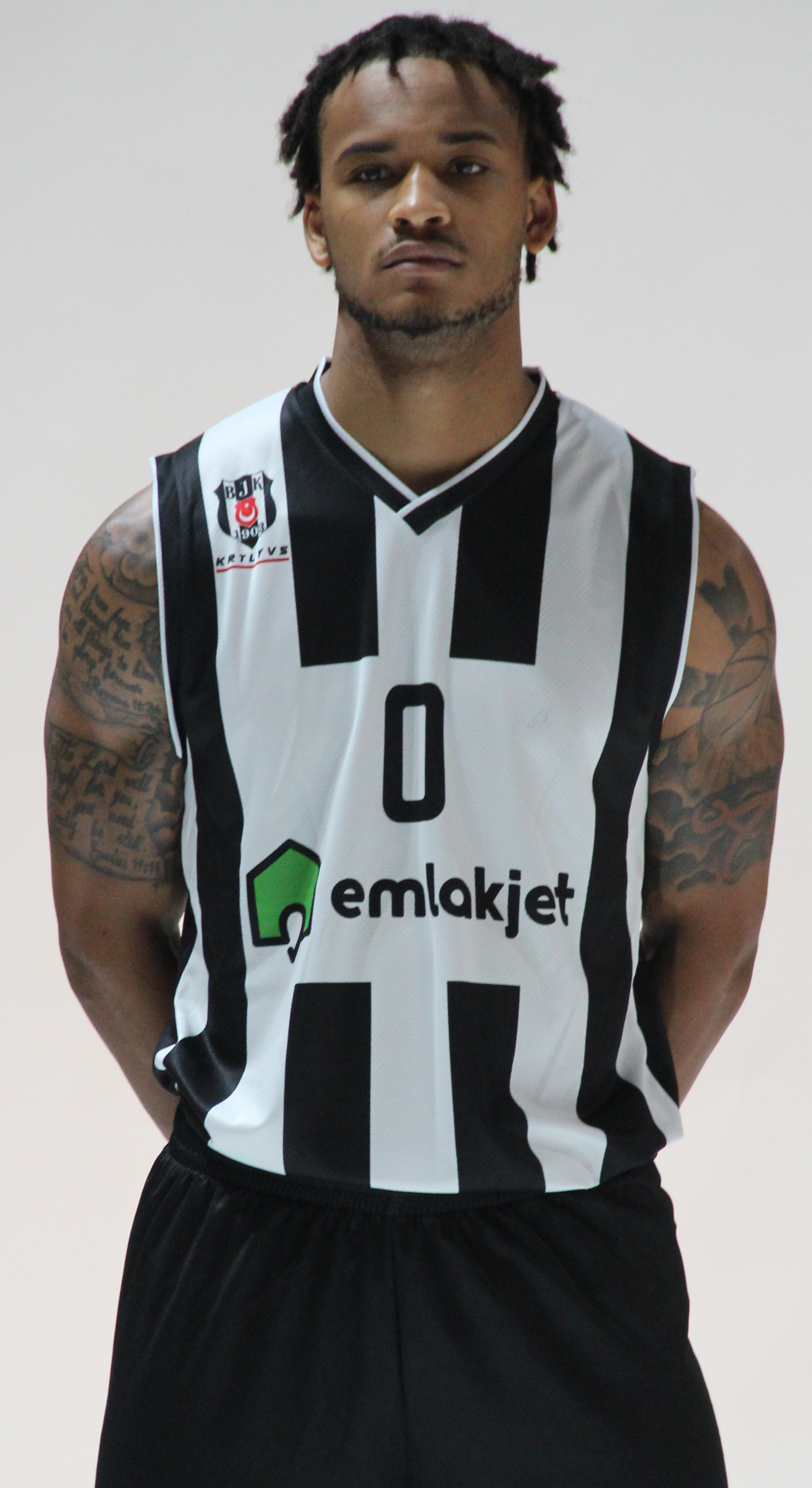

No. 31 – Bursaspor
- Position: Shooting guard
- League: Basketbol Süper Ligi

Personal information
- Born: July 24, 1997 (age 29) Stone Mountain, Georgia, U.S.
- Listed height: 6 ft 3 in (1.91 m)
- Listed weight: 190 lb (86 kg)

Career information
- High school: Columbia (Decatur, Georgia); Tucker (Tucker, Georgia)
- College: Auburn (2015–2019)
- NBA draft: 2019: undrafted
- Playing career: 2019–present

Career history
- 2019–2020: Maine Red Claws
- 2021: Westchester Knicks
- 2021–2022: Long Island Nets
- 2022: Beşiktaş
- 2022–2023: Wilki Morskie Szczecin
- 2023–2024: JL Bourg
- 2024–2025: Ironi Ness Ziona
- 2025–2026: Ratiopharm Ulm
- 2026–present: Bursaspor

Career highlights
- PLK champion (2023); PLK Finals MVP (2023); 2× Second-team All-SEC (2018, 2019); SEC Tournament MVP (2019)
- Stats at NBA.com
- Stats at Basketball Reference

Bryce Wade Brown (born July 24, 1997) is an American professional basketball player for Bursaspor of the Turkish Basketbol Süper Ligi (BSL). He played college basketball for the Auburn Tigers and was the leading scorer for the Tigers first ever Final Four team.

== Early life ==
Brown began his high school career at Columbia High School, where he averaged 18 points and 5 assists per game as a junior. He was playing a video game when his father, Cedric Brown suffered a heart attack, requiring emergency stent surgery. At the time, Columbia was competing in the Georgia AAAA state playoffs, and Brown was limited by a back injury, resulting in a loss in the championship game.

As a senior, he transferred to Tucker High School. Brown was a three-star recruit, the number 70 shooting guard in the 247sports rankings. He committed to Auburn.

== College career ==
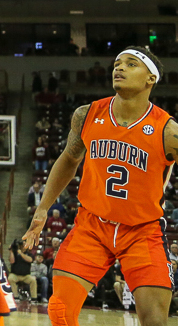
Brown in 2019

Brown posted 10.1 points per game as a freshman at Auburn. As a sophomore, Brown averaged 7.5 points per game. He increased his scoring to 15.9 points per game (9th in the SEC) as a junior, shooting 40.1 percent from the field and 38.2 percent from 3-point range. Brown was the first team All-SEC selection by the Associated Press and second team selection by the coaches. After the season, Brown declared for the 2018 NBA draft but did not hire an agent to preserve his collegiate eligibility.

On May 29, he announced his return to Auburn, citing "unfinished business." As a senior, Brown averaged 15.9 points per game (6th in the SEC) and became Auburn's program leader in made 3-pointers. He scored 34 points in a game against Dayton. Brown was named to the Second Team All-SEC at the conclusion of the regular season. He helped lead Auburn to the Final Four and had 12 points in the 63–62 loss to Virginia.

== Professional career ==
=== Maine Red Claws (2019–2020) ===
After going undrafted in the 2019 NBA draft, Brown was invited to play with the Sacramento Kings during the 2019 NBA Summer League in Las Vegas.

Following his performance in the summer league, he was signed as an affiliate player to the Maine Red Claws, the G League team owned by the Boston Celtics.

On December 7, 2019, Brown hit a franchise record 11 out of 11 three pointers for the Red Claws in a 128–123 loss to the Delaware Blue Coats. When the G League season was suspended on March 12, 2020, Brown was averaging 16.1 points, 3.6 rebounds, 2.4 assists and a steal per game while his 42.4% shooting from beyond the arc ranked 13th in the G League.

=== Westchester Knicks (2021) ===
On December 17, 2020, Brown was signed by the New York Knicks, and was then waived after training camp. He was then assigned to the Knicks’ G League affiliate, the Westchester Knicks. Brown averaged 5.4 points, 2.0 rebounds and 1.2 assists per game.

=== Long Island Nets (2021–2022) ===
In August 2021, Brown joined the Cleveland Cavaliers for the NBA Summer League. and on September 23, his rights were acquired by the Long Island Nets. On October 10, he signed with the Brooklyn Nets, but was waived the next day. On October 25, 2021, Brown was included in the training camp roster of the Long Island Nets.

=== Beşiktaş (2022) ===
On July 25, 2022, he has signed with Beşiktaş Icrypex of the Basketbol Süper Ligi (BSL). He played three games for the team and averaged 10 points per game.

=== Wilki Morskie Szczecin (2022–2023) ===
On October 29, 2022, he has signed with Wilki Morskie Szczecin of the Polish Basketball League (PLK). He averaged 12.2 points per game.

=== JL Bourg (2023–2024) ===
On July 3, 2023, he signed with JL Bourg of the LNB Pro A. He averaged 10.0 points per game.

=== Ironi Ness Ziona (2024–2025) ===
In July 2024, he signed with Ironi Ness Ziona of the Israeli Basketball Premier League.

=== Ratiopharm Ulm (2025–2026) ===
On July 30, 2025, he signed with Ratiopharm Ulm of the German Basketball Bundesliga.

=== Bursaspor Basketbol (2026–present) ===
On October 8, 2026, he signed with Bursaspor Basketbol of the Basketbol Süper Ligi (BSL).

== The Basketball Tournament ==
Brown joined War Tampa, a team composed primarily of Auburn alumni in The Basketball Tournament 2020. He scored eight points in a 76–53 loss to House of 'Paign in the first round.

== Career statistics ==
Legend
GP	Games played	GS	Games started	MPG	Minutes per game
FG%	Field goal percentage	3P%	3-point field goal percentage	FT%	Free throw percentage
RPG	Rebounds per game	APG	Assists per game	SPG	Steals per game
BPG	Blocks per game	PPG	Points per game	**Bold**	Career high

=== College ===
*	Led NCAA Division I

Year	Team	GP	GS	MPG	FG%	3P%	FT%	RPG	APG	SPG	BPG	PPG
2015–16	Auburn	30	11	24.7	.339	.370	**.826**	1.8	.7	.4	-	10.1
2016–17	Auburn	28	13	21.1	.360	.400	.667	2.0	1.3	1.0	**.2**	7.5
2017–18	Auburn	33	33	31.2	.401	.382	.775	2.0	1.7	1.0	**.2**	**15.9**
2018–19	Auburn	**40***	**40***	**32.0**	**.437**	**.410**	.807	**2.1**	**1.9**	**1.1**	.1	**15.9**
Career		131	97	27.8	.395	.392	.785	2.0	1.4	.9	.1	12.8
