= 1984–85 LSU Tigers basketball team =

American college basketball season

1984–85 LSU Tigers basketball

SEC regular season champions

NCAA tournament
- Conference: Southeastern Conference
- West Division

Ranking
- Coaches: No. 19
- AP: No. 20
- Record: 19–10 (13–5 SEC)
- Head coach: Dale Brown (13th season)
- Assistant coaches: Ron Abernathy (9th season); Bo Bahnsen; Johnny Jones (1st season)
- Home arena: LSU Assembly Center

1984–85 Southeastern Conference men's basketball standings
	Conf.				Overall
Team	W		L	PCT	W		L	PCT
No. 20 LSU	13	–	5	.722	19	–	10	.655
No. 19 Georgia	12	–	6	.667	22	–	9	.710
Alabama	11	–	7	.611	23	–	10	.697
Kentucky	11	–	7	.611	18	–	13	.581
Florida	9	–	9	.500	18	–	12	.600
Mississippi State	9	–	9	.500	13	–	15	.464
Tennessee	8	–	10	.444	22	–	15	.595
Auburn †	8	–	10	.444	22	–	12	.647
Ole Miss	5	–	13	.278	11	–	17	.393
Vanderbilt	4	–	14	.222	11	–	17	.393
† 1985 SEC tournament winner Rankings from AP poll

The 1984-85 LSU Tigers men's basketball team represented Louisiana State University during the 1984–85 NCAA men's college basketball season. The head coach was Dale Brown. The team was a member of the Southeastern Conference and played their home games at LSU Assembly Center.

The Tigers finished in first place in the SEC regular season standings, but lost to Auburn in the quarterfinals of the SEC Tournament. LSU received an at-large bid to the NCAA tournament as No. 4 seed in the Southeast region where they were upset in the opening round to Navy. The team finished with a 19–10 record (13–5 SEC).

== Roster ==
1984–85 LSU Tigers men's basketball team
Players
Coaches

Pos.	#	Name	Height	Weight	Year	Previous school	Hometown
G	10	Derrick Taylor	6 ft 0 in (1.83 m)	185 lb (84 kg)	RS Jr	Redemptorist HS	Baton Rouge, LA
G	11	Anthony Wilson	6 ft 4 in (1.93 m)	192 lb (87 kg)	So	Plain Dealing HS	Plain Dealing, LA
G	21	Dennis Brown	6 ft 0 in (1.83 m)	169 lb (77 kg)	So	Woodlawn HS	Baton Rouge, LA
F	24	John Williams	6 ft 8 in (2.03 m)	230 lb (104 kg)	Fr	Crenshaw HS	Los Angeles, CA
G	31	Oliver Brown	6 ft 6 in (1.98 m)	195 lb (88 kg)	So	University HS	Baton Rouge, LA
F/C	33	Steffond Johnson	6 ft 8 in (2.03 m)	212 lb (96 kg)	Sr	Longview HS	Longview, TX
G/F	33	Ricky Blanton	6 ft 6 in (1.98 m)	220 lb (100 kg)	Fr	Killian HS	Miami, FL
F	35	Jerry Reynolds	6 ft 8 in (2.03 m)	198 lb (90 kg)	Jr	Alexander Hamilton HS	Brooklyn, NY
F	41	Nikita Wilson	6 ft 7 in (2.01 m)	200 lb (91 kg)	So	Leesville HS	Leesville, LA
C	43	José Vargas	6 ft 9 in (2.06 m)	225 lb (102 kg)	Fr	Evangelico Central	La Romana, Dominican Republic
G/F	44	Don Redden	6 ft 6 in (1.98 m)	213 lb (97 kg)	Jr	Ouachita HS	Monroe, LA
C	45	Zoran Jovanovich	7 ft 0 in (2.13 m)	247 lb (112 kg)	Fr	Fifth HS	Belgrade, Yugoslavia

Head coach

- Dale Brown (Minot State)

Assistant coach(es)

Legend

- (C) Team captain
- (S) Suspended
- (I) Ineligible
- (W) Walk-on
- Injured
- Current redshirt

Roster

== Schedule and results ==
Date time, TV	Rank^{#}	Opponent^{#}	Result	Record	Site city, state
Exhibition
Regular season
Nov 28, 1984*	No. 16	Loyola-Chicago	W 102–96	1–0	LSU Assembly Center; Baton Rouge, Louisiana
Dec 1, 1984*	No. 16	at Oral Roberts	W 74–71	2–0	Mabee Center; Tulsa, Oklahoma
Dec 3, 1984*	No. 13	Texas	W 87–79	3–0	LSU Assembly Center; Baton Rouge, Louisiana
Dec 5, 1984	No. 13	Ole Miss	W 89–64	4–0 (1–0)	LSU Assembly Center; Baton Rouge, Louisiana
Dec 8, 1984*	No. 13	at Houston	L 73–81	4–1	Hofheinz Pavilion; Houston, Texas
Dec 21, 1984*	No. 19	New Orleans	W 78–64	5–1	LSU Assembly Center; Baton Rouge, Louisiana
Dec 22, 1984*	No. 19	UNC Wilmington	W 88–65	6–1	LSU Assembly Center; Baton Rouge, Louisiana
Dec 28, 1984*	No. 18	Utah State	W 103–71	7–1	LSU Assembly Center; Baton Rouge, Louisiana
Dec 30, 1984	No. 18	Alabama	W 63–61	8–1 (2–0)	LSU Assembly Center; Baton Rouge, Louisiana
Jan 2, 1985	No. 14	at Georgia	W 79–74	9–1 (3–0)	Stegeman Coliseum; Athens, Georgia
Jan 5, 1985	No. 14	at Mississippi State	L 69–83	9–2 (3–1)	Humphrey Coliseum; Starkville, Mississippi
Jan 9, 1985		at Alabama	L 67–79	9–3 (3–2)	Memorial Coliseum; Tuscaloosa, Alabama
Jan 12, 1985		Tennessee	W 75–65	10–3 (4–2)	LSU Assembly Center; Baton Rouge, Louisiana
Jan 17, 1985		at Ole Miss	L 65–68	10–4 (4–3)	Tad Smith Coliseum; Oxford, Mississippi
Jan 19, 1985		at Vanderbilt	W 69–68	11–4 (5–3)	Memorial Gymnasium; Nashville, Tennessee
Jan 23, 1985		Florida	W 86–68	12–4 (6–3)	LSU Assembly Center; Baton Rouge, Louisiana
Jan 26, 1985		Auburn	W 80–62	13–4 (7–3)	LSU Assembly Center; Baton Rouge, Louisiana
Jan 31, 1985		at Kentucky	L 43–53	13–5 (7–4)	Rupp Arena; Lexington, Kentucky
Feb 2, 1985		Georgia	L 58–59	13–6 (7–5)	LSU Assembly Center; Baton Rouge, Louisiana
Feb 6, 1985		Mississippi State	W 80–65	14–6 (8–5)	LSU Assembly Center; Baton Rouge, Louisiana
Feb 10, 1985		No. 15 North Carolina	L 70–75	14–7	LSU Assembly Center; Baton Rouge, Louisiana
Feb 14, 1985		at Tennessee	W 87–82	15–7 (9–5)	Stokely Athletics Center; Knoxville, Tennessee
Feb 16, 1985		at No. 8 Syracuse	L 64–76	15–8	Carrier Dome; Syracuse, New York
Feb 20, 1985		Vanderbilt	W 64–55	16–8 (10–5)	LSU Assembly Center; Baton Rouge, Louisiana
Feb 23, 1985		at Florida	W 61–59	17–8 (11–5)	O'Connell Center; Gainesville, Florida
Feb 27, 1985		at Auburn	W 78–73	18–8 (12–5)	Memorial Coliseum; Auburn, Alabama
Mar 2, 1985		Kentucky	W 67–61	19–8 (13–5)	LSU Assembly Center; Baton Rouge, Louisiana
SEC Tournament
Mar 7, 1985	No. 19	vs. Auburn; Quarterfinals	L 55–58	19–9	Birmingham-Jefferson Civic Center; Birmingham, Alabama
NCAA Tournament
Mar 15, 1985*	(4 SE) No. 20	vs. (13 SE) Navy; First round	L 55–78	19–10	University of Dayton Arena; Dayton, Ohio
*Non-conference game. ^{#}Rankings from AP Poll. (#) Tournament seedings in parentheses. SE=Southeast.

== Team players drafted into the NBA ==
Round	Pick	Player	NBA club
1	22	Jerry Reynolds	Milwaukee Bucks
