= 1984–85 Kentucky Wildcats men's basketball team =

1984–85 season of University of Kentucky men's basketball team

1984–85 Kentucky Wildcats men's basketball
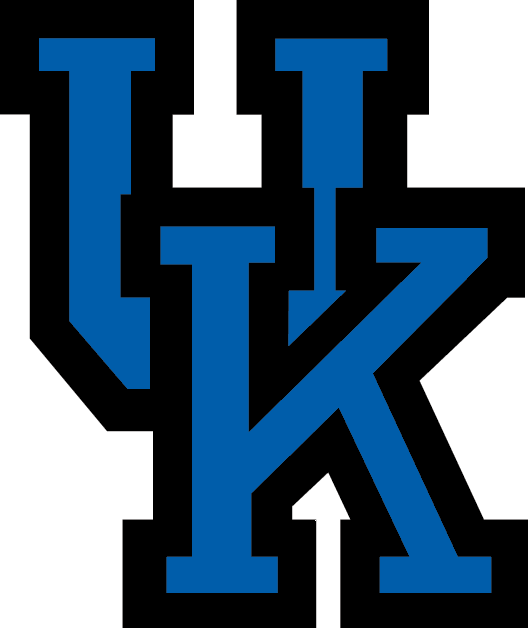

NCAA tournament, Sweet Sixteen
- Conference: Southeastern Conference
- Record: 18–13 (11–7 SEC)
- Head coach: Joe B. Hall (13th season)
- Assistant coach: Jim Hatfield; Leonard Hamilton; Lake Kelly
- Home arena: Rupp Arena

1984–85 Southeastern Conference men's basketball standings
	Conf.				Overall
Team	W		L	PCT	W		L	PCT
No. 20 LSU	13	–	5	.722	19	–	10	.655
No. 19 Georgia	12	–	6	.667	22	–	9	.710
Alabama	11	–	7	.611	23	–	10	.697
Kentucky	11	–	7	.611	18	–	13	.581
Florida	9	–	9	.500	18	–	12	.600
Mississippi State	9	–	9	.500	13	–	15	.464
Tennessee	8	–	10	.444	22	–	15	.595
Auburn †	8	–	10	.444	22	–	12	.647
Ole Miss	5	–	13	.278	11	–	17	.393
Vanderbilt	4	–	14	.222	11	–	17	.393
† 1985 SEC tournament winner Rankings from AP poll

The 1984–85 Kentucky Wildcats men's basketball team represented University of Kentucky in the 1984–85 NCAA Division I men's basketball season. Head coach Joe B. Hall led his team to end his final coaching season with an overall record of 18–13. In The 1985 NCAA Tournament the Wildcats were invited as a #12 seed. After wins vs Washington and UNLV the team advanced to the Sweet 16. Kentucky's run would come to an end against St. John's after dropping an 86–70 contest.

== Roster ==
1984–85 Kentucky Wildcats men's basketball team
Players	Coaches
Pos. / # / Name / Height / Weight / Year / Hometown; F / 34 / Kenny Walker / 6 ft 8 in (2.03 m) / 205 lb (93 kg) / Jr / Roberta, Georgia	Head coach: Joe B. Hall; Assistant coach(es) Legend: (C) Team captain; (S) Suspended; (I) Ineligible; (W) Walk-on; Injured; Current redshirt

== Schedule and results ==
Date time, TV	Rank^{#}	Opponent^{#}	Result	Record	Site city, state
Regular Season
Nov 27, 1984*		Toledo	W 63–54	1–0	Rupp Arena; Lexington, Kentucky
Dec 1, 1984*		at Purdue	L 56–66	1–1	Mackey Arena; West Lafayette, Indiana
Dec 4, 1984*; UKTV		No. 8 Southern Methodist	L 54–56	1–2	Rupp Arena; Lexington, Kentucky
Dec 8, 1984*		at No. 11 Indiana	L 68–81	1–3	Assembly Hall; Bloomington, Indiana
Dec 15, 1984*; LSN		at No. 14 Louisville	L 64–71	1–4	Freedom Hall; Louisville, Kentucky
Dec 21, 1984*		East Tennessee State	W 69–54	2–4	Rupp Arena; Lexington, Kentucky
Dec 22, 1984*		Cincinnati	W 66–55	3–4	Rupp Arena; Lexington, Kentucky
Dec 31, 1984*		vs. No. 11 Kansas	W 92–89	4–4	Freedom Hall; Louisville, Kentucky
Jan 2, 1985		Auburn	W 68–61	5–4 (1–0)	Rupp Arena; Lexington, Kentucky
Jan 5, 1985*; CBS		No. 17 NC State	W 78–62	6–4	Rupp Arena; Lexington, Kentucky
Jan 7, 1985		Vanderbilt	W 75–58	7–4 (2–0)	Rupp Arena; Lexington, Kentucky
Jan 9, 1985		at Ole Miss	W 57–45	8–4 (3–0)	Tad Smith Coliseum; Oxford, Mississippi
Jan 12, 1985		at Alabama	L 58–60	8–5 (3–1)	Memorial Coliseum; Tuscaloosa, Alabama
Jan 16, 1985		Mississippi State	W 58–57	9–5 (4–1)	Rupp Arena; Lexington, Kentucky
Jan 19, 1985		Florida	L 55–67	9–6 (4–2)	Rupp Arena; Lexington, Kentucky
Jan 23, 1985		at Georgia	L 73–81	9–7 (4–3)	Stegeman Coliseum; Athens, Georgia
Jan 27, 1985		at Tennessee	L 65–81	9–8 (4–4)	Stokely Athletic Center; Knoxville, Tennessee
Jan 31, 1985		LSU	W 53–43	10–8 (5–4)	Rupp Arena; Lexington, Kentucky
Feb 2, 1985		at Auburn	W 49–47 ^{OT}	11–8 (6–4)	Memorial Coliseum; Auburn, Alabama
Feb 7, 1985		at Vanderbilt	W 68–62	12–8 (7–4)	Memorial Gymnasium; Nashville, Tennessee
Feb 9, 1985		Ole Miss	W 67–52	13–8 (8–4)	Rupp Arena; Lexington, Kentucky
Feb 13, 1985		Alabama	W 51–48	14–8 (9–4)	Rupp Arena; Lexington, Kentucky
Feb 16, 1985		at Mississippi State	L 69–82	14–9 (9–5)	Humphrey Coliseum; Starkville, Mississippi
Feb 20, 1985		at Florida	W 76–68	15–9 (10–5)	O'Connell Center; Gainesville, Florida
Feb 24, 1985		No. 18 Georgia	L 77–79	15–10 (10–6)	Rupp Arena; Lexington, Kentucky
Feb 28, 1985		Tennessee	W 92–67	16–10 (11–6)	Rupp Arena; Lexington, Kentucky
Mar 2, 1985		at LSU	L 61–67	16–11 (11–7)	Maravich Assembly Center; Baton Rouge, Louisiana
SEC tournament
Mar 7, 1985*; LSN	(4)	vs. (5) Florida; Quarterfinals	L 55–58	16–12	BJCC Coliseum; Birmingham, Alabama
NCAA tournament
Mar 14, 1985*	(12 W)	vs. (5 W) Washington; First round	W 66–58	17–12	Special Events Center (7,351); Salt Lake City, Utah
Mar 16, 1985*	(12 W)	vs. (4 W) No. 9 Nevada-Las Vegas; Second round	W 64–61	18–12	Special Events Center; Salt Lake City, Utah
Mar 22, 1985*; CBS	(12 W)	vs. (1 W) No. 3 St. John's; Sweet Sixteen	L 70–86	18–13	McNichols Sports Arena; Denver, Colorado
*Non-conference game. ^{#}Rankings from AP Poll. (#) Tournament seedings in parentheses. W=West.
