= 1985 SEC men's basketball tournament =

Annual college basketball tournament

- Classification: Division I
- Season: 1984–85
- Teams: 10
- Site: Birmingham-Jefferson Convention Complex; Birmingham, Alabama
- Champions: Auburn (1st title)
- Winning coach: Sonny Smith (1st title)
- MVP: Chuck Person (Auburn)
- Attendance: 122,900
- Television: Lorimar Sports Network (Entire tournament); NBC (Championship game)

1984–85 Southeastern Conference men's basketball standings
	Conf.				Overall
Team	W		L	PCT	W		L	PCT
No. 20 LSU	13	–	5	.722	19	–	10	.655
No. 19 Georgia	12	–	6	.667	22	–	9	.710
Alabama	11	–	7	.611	23	–	10	.697
Kentucky	11	–	7	.611	18	–	13	.581
Florida	9	–	9	.500	18	–	12	.600
Mississippi State	9	–	9	.500	13	–	15	.464
Tennessee	8	–	10	.444	22	–	15	.595
Auburn †	8	–	10	.444	22	–	12	.647
Ole Miss	5	–	13	.278	11	–	17	.393
Vanderbilt	4	–	14	.222	11	–	17	.393
† 1985 SEC tournament winner Rankings from AP poll

The 1985 SEC Men’s Basketball Tournament took place from March 6–9, 1985 at the Birmingham-Jefferson Convention Complex in Birmingham, Alabama. The Auburn Tigers men's basketball team won their first ever SEC Tournament title in the championship game on March 9, 1985. Auburn defeated Alabama 53–49 for the SEC's automatic bid to the 1985 NCAA Men’s Division I Basketball tournament.

Television coverage of the tournament’s first round, the quarterfinals, and semifinals were produced and regionally syndicated by the now-defunct Lorimar Sports Network (formerly Sports Productions, Inc.), the sports broadcasting arm of Lorimar Productions. Outside of the SEC geographical footprint, the championship game was nationally televised on NBC via that network’s in-house sports division, NBC Sports (With Marv Albert and Bucky Waters handling the Play by Play and Color respectively).

== Bracket ==
First Round; Wednesday, March 6 Lorimar Sports Network
8	Auburn	68
9	Ole Miss	60
7	Tennessee	71
10	Vanderbilt	51

Second Round; Thursday, March 7 LSN
1	19 LSU	55
8	Auburn	58
5	Florida	58
4	Kentucky	55
2	17 Georgia	67
7	Tennessee	61
3	Alabama	42
6	Mississippi State	31

Semi-Finals; Friday, March 8 LSN
8	Auburn	43
5	Florida	42
2	17 Georgia	53
3	Alabama	74

Finals; Saturday, March 9 LSN, NBC
8	Auburn	53
3	Alabama	49
