= 1984–85 Auburn Tigers men's basketball team =

American college basketball season

1984–85 Auburn Tigers men's basketball

SEC tournament champions

NCAA tournament, Sweet Sixteen
- Conference: Southeastern Conference
- Record: 22–12 (8–10 SEC)
- Head coach: Sonny Smith (7th season)
- Home arena: Memorial Coliseum

1984–85 Southeastern Conference men's basketball standings
	Conf.				Overall
Team	W		L	PCT	W		L	PCT
No. 20 LSU	13	–	5	.722	19	–	10	.655
No. 19 Georgia	12	–	6	.667	22	–	9	.710
Alabama	11	–	7	.611	23	–	10	.697
Kentucky	11	–	7	.611	18	–	13	.581
Florida	9	–	9	.500	18	–	12	.600
Mississippi State	9	–	9	.500	13	–	15	.464
Tennessee	8	–	10	.444	22	–	15	.595
Auburn †	8	–	10	.444	22	–	12	.647
Ole Miss	5	–	13	.278	11	–	17	.393
Vanderbilt	4	–	14	.222	11	–	17	.393
† 1985 SEC tournament winner Rankings from AP poll

The 1984–85 Auburn Tigers men's basketball team represented Auburn University in the 1984–85 college basketball season. The team's head coach was Sonny Smith, who was in his seventh season at Auburn.

Smith and the Tigers had to deal with the losses of center Charles Barkley (left for NBA) and forward Greg Turner (graduated). However, a stellar recruiting class of five freshman, including forward Chris Morris, centers Jeff Moore and Darren Guest, and guards Johnny Lynn and Terrence Howard joined holdovers Chuck Person, Gerald White, and Frank Ford and matured and improved as the season progressed. The team played their home games at Memorial Coliseum in Auburn, Alabama.

The Tigers finished the season 22–12, 8–10 in SEC play. They defeated Ole Miss, LSU, Florida, and Alabama to win the SEC tournament championship. They received an automatic bid to the NCAA tournament where they defeated Purdue and Kansas to advance to the Sweet Sixteen where they lost to North Carolina.

== Roster ==
1984–85 Auburn Tigers men's basketball team
Players
Coaches

Pos.	#	Name	Height	Weight	Year	Previous school	Hometown
F	45	Chuck Person	6 ft 8 in (2.03 m)	—	Jr	Brantley High School	Brantley, AL
G	15	Frank Ford	6 ft 4 in (1.93 m)	—	So	Osceola High School	Kissimmee, Florida
F	34	Chris Morris	6 ft 7 in (2.01 m)	—	Fr	Frederick Douglass High School	Atlanta, Georgia
C	40	Jeff Moore	6 ft 8 in (2.03 m)	—	Fr	Midfield High School	Midfield, Alabama
G	12	Gerald White	6 ft 1 in (1.85 m)	—	So	Richmond Academy	Augusta, Georgia
C	33	Carey Holland	6 ft 7 in (2.01 m)	—	Sr	Baldwin High School	Baldwin, Florida
G	10	Terrence Howard	6 ft 1 in (1.85 m)	—	Fr	Southwest, Alabama	Southwest, Alabama
C	32	Darren Guest	6 ft 9 in (2.06 m)	—	Fr	Thornton Township	Harvey, Illinois
G	14	Johnny Lynn	6 ft 3 in (1.91 m)	—	Fr	Beech High School	Hendersonville, Tennessee
F	25	Gary Godfrey	6 ft 7 in (2.01 m)	—	Jr	North Shore High School	North Palm Beach, Florida

Head coach

- Sonny Smith (Milligan)

Assistant coach(es)

Legend

- (C) Team captain
- (S) Suspended
- (I) Ineligible
- (W) Walk-on
- Injured
- Current redshirt

== Schedule and results ==
Date time, TV	Rank^{#}	Opponent^{#}	Result	Record	Site (attendance) city, state
Regular season
Nov 24, 1984*		Stetson	W 92-50	1-0	Beard-Eaves Memorial Coliseum; Auburn, AL
Nov ?, 1984*		Columbus College	W 91-56	2-0	Beard-Eaves Memorial Coliseum; Auburn, AL
Nov 30, 1984*; ESPN		at No. 13 UAB	W 61-59	3-0	Birmingham-Jefferson Civic Center; Birmingham, AL
Dec ?, 1984*		Armstrong State	W 80-47	4-0	Beard-Eaves Memorial Coliseum; Auburn, AL
Dec 8, 1984*		Mercer	W 70-69	5-0	Beard-Eaves Memorial Coliseum; Auburn, AL
Dec 12, 1984*		Radford	W 79-57	6-0	Beard-Eaves Memorial Coliseum; Auburn, AL
Dec 21, 1984*		vs. VCU; Krystal Classic	L 59–78	6-1	McKenzie Arena; Chattanooga, TN
Dec 22, 1984*		vs. Delaware; Krystal Classic	W 95-63	7-1	McKenzie Arena; Chattanooga, TN
Dec 29, 1984*		at West Virginia	W 59-58	8-1	WVU Coliseum; Morgantown, WV
Jan 2, 1985; WTBS		at Kentucky	L 61-68	8-2 (0-1)	Rupp Arena; Lexington, KY
Jan 5, 1985		Florida	W 80-74	9-2 (1-1)	Beard-Eaves Memorial Coliseum; Auburn, AL
Jan 9, 1985		at Tennessee	L 74-86	9-3 (1-2)	Stokely Center; Knoxville, TN
Jan 12, 1985		Mississippi State	W 62-53	10-3 (2-2)	Beard-Eaves Memorial Coliseum; Auburn, AL
Jan 16, 1985		Alabama	L 55-60	10-4 (2-3)	Beard-Eaves Memorial Coliseum; Auburn, AL
Jan 19, 1985		at Georgia	L 80-97	10-5 (2-4)	Stegeman Coliseum; Athens, GA
Jan 24, 1985; USA		Mississippi	W 93-73	11-5 (3-4)	Beard-Eaves Memorial Coliseum; Auburn, AL
Jan 26, 1985		at LSU	L 62-80	11-6 (3-5)	Maravich Assembly Center; Baton Rouge, LA
Jan 30, 1985		at Vanderbilt	W 86-80	12-6 (4-5)	Memorial Gymnasium; Nashville, TN
Feb 2, 1985		Kentucky	L 47-49 ^{OT}	12-7 (4-6)	Beard-Eaves Memorial Coliseum; Auburn, AL
Feb 6, 1985		at Florida	W 81-78	13-7 (5-6)	Stephen C. O'Connell Center; Gainesville, FL
Feb 9, 1985		Tennessee	W 75-60	14-7 (6-6)	Beard-Eaves Memorial Coliseum; Auburn, AL
Feb 13, 1985		at Mississippi State	L 65-82	14-8 (6-7)	Humphrey Coliseum; Starkville, MS
Feb 16, 1985		at Alabama	L 72-74	14-9 (6-8)	Coleman Coliseum; Tuscaloosa, AL
Feb 21, 1985; USA		No. 18 Georgia	L 84-86	14-10 (6-9)	Beard-Eaves Memorial Coliseum; Auburn, AL
Feb 23, 1985		at Mississippi	W 69-57	15-10 (7-9)	C.M. Tad Smith Coliseum; Oxford, MS
Feb 27, 1985		LSU	L 73-78	15-11 (7-10)	Beard-Eaves Memorial Coliseum; Auburn, AL
March 2, 1985		Vanderbilt	W 84-58	16-11 (8-10)	Beard-Eaves Memorial Coliseum; Auburn, AL
SEC Tournament
March 6, 1985; LSN	(8)	vs. (9) Mississippi; First round	W 68-60	17-11	Birmingham-Jefferson Civic Center; Birmingham, AL
March 7, 1985; LSN	(8)	vs. (1) No. 19 LSU; Second Round	W 58-55	18-11	Birmingham-Jefferson Civic Center; Birmingham, AL
March 8, 1985; LSN	(8)	vs. (5) Florida; Semifinals	W 43-42	19-11	Birmingham-Jefferson Civic Center; Birmingham, AL
March 9, 1985; LSN	(8)	vs. (3) Alabama; Finals	W 53-49 ^{OT}	20-11	Birmingham-Jefferson Civic Center; Birmingham, AL
NCAA Tournament
March 14, 1985*	(11 SE)	vs. (6 SE) Purdue; First round	W 59-58	21-11	Purcell Pavilion at the Joyce Center; South Bend, IN
March 16, 1985*	(11 SE)	vs. (3 SE) No. 13 Kansas; Second Round	W 66-64	22-11	Purcell Pavilion at the Joyce Center; South Bend, IN
Mar 22, 1985*; CBS	(11 SE)	vs. (2 SE) No. 7 North Carolina; Southeast Regional semifinal - Sweet 16	L 56–62	22–12	Birmingham-Jefferson Civic Center; Birmingham, AL
*Non-conference game. ^{#}Rankings from AP Poll. (#) Tournament seedings in parentheses.
