= Chuck Person =

American basketball player (born 1964)

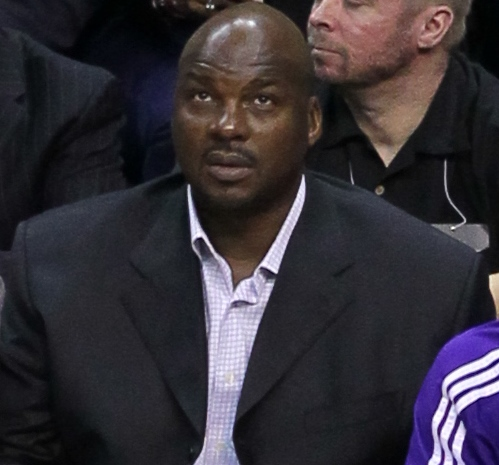
- Person in 2010

Personal information
- Born: June 27, 1964 (age 62) Brantley, Alabama, U.S.
- Listed height: 6 ft 8 in (2.03 m)
- Listed weight: 241 lb (109 kg)

Career information
- High school: Brantley (Brantley, Alabama)
- College: Auburn (1982–1986)
- NBA draft: 1986: 1st round, 4th overall pick
- Drafted by: Indiana Pacers
- Playing career: 1986–2000
- Position: Small forward / power forward
- Number: 45
- Coaching career: 2000–2017

Career history

Playing
- 1986–1992: Indiana Pacers
- 1992–1994: Minnesota Timberwolves
- 1994–1998: San Antonio Spurs
- 1999: Charlotte Hornets
- 1999–2000: Seattle SuperSonics

Career highlights
- As player: NBA Rookie of the Year (1987); NBA All-Rookie First Team (1987); Third-team All-American – NABC (1986); 3x First-team All-SEC (1984–86); SEC Tournament MVP (1985); No. 45 retired by Auburn Tigers; USA Basketball Male Athlete of the Year (1985); As assistant coach: NBA champion (2010)

Career NBA statistics
- Points: 13,858 (14.7 ppg)
- Rebounds: 4,763 (5.1 rpg)
- Assists: 2,645 (2.8 apg)
- Stats at NBA.com
- Stats at Basketball Reference
Medals
Men's basketball
Representing United States
Summer Universiade
Silver medal – second place	1985 Kobe	National team

Chuck Connors Person (born June 27, 1964) is an American former basketball player and coach. Person played 14 seasons in the National Basketball Association (NBA) and was the 1987 NBA Rookie of the Year. Person played college basketball for the Auburn Tigers and was selected fourth overall in the 1986 NBA draft by the Indiana Pacers, for whom he played six seasons. He also played for the Minnesota Timberwolves, San Antonio Spurs, Charlotte Hornets and Seattle SuperSonics.

His 17-year coaching career ended when Person was ensnared in a college recruitment scandal and pleaded guilty to a bribery charge.

== Early life and college ==
Born in Brantley, Alabama, Person was named after NBA player, MLB player, and actor Chuck Connors. He attended Brantley High School in Brantley, Alabama and played college basketball at Auburn University. He was the most prolific scorer in Auburn basketball history. Person was a four-year letter winner at Auburn from 1982 to 1986, helping the team to Auburn's first three NCAA Tournament appearances (1984–1986), including a trip to the Elite Eight in 1986. He also helped Auburn win the 1985 SEC Tournament, for which he was named Tournament MVP as Auburn was the first league school to win four tournament games in four days.

Person, who played alongside fellow Auburn greats Charles Barkley and Chris Morris, is the all-time scoring leader in Auburn history, with 2,311 points in 126 games for an 18.3 ppg mark, which is sixth all time in school history. He is also the school record-holder for field goals made (1,017) and field goals attempted (1,899) and is third in total rebounds (940).

Person was a two-time All-American (1985, 1986), a three-time First Team All-SEC selection and was selected to ESPN's SEC Silver Anniversary Team. Nicknamed "the Rifleman", he had his No. 45 jersey retired at Auburn on February 18, 2006.

== Professional career ==
=== Indiana Pacers (1986–1992) ===
Person was selected fourth in the 1986 NBA draft by the Indiana Pacers; the small forward won the Rookie of the Year award in 1987 and played six seasons with Indiana. Person averaged a career-high 21.6 points in 1988. During his NBA playing years he was known as "the Rifleman" due to his 3-point shooting ability and the fact that he was named after Chuck Connors, star of the TV series The Rifleman.

While a member of the Pacers, Person engaged in a brief on-court rivalry with Larry Bird of the Boston Celtics, which reached its peak when the two teams faced off in the 1991 NBA playoffs. In their first-round series encounter, Person would average 26 points on 55% shooting from 3-point distance, including a 39-point performance in Game 2 at Boston Garden. Person also scored 30 points in a series-tying Game 4 victory at Market Square Arena, before dropping 32 points in an eventual Game 5 defeat in Boston.

The emergence of Reggie Miller as an all-star shooter made Person expendable, and in the 1992 offseason he was traded to the Minnesota Timberwolves, along with Micheal Williams, in a deal that sent Sam Mitchell and Pooh Richardson to Indiana.

=== Minnesota Timberwolves (1992–1994) ===
Person played only two seasons with the Timberwolves. He averaged a career-low 11.6 points in 1993–94.

=== San Antonio Spurs (1994–1998) ===
Person played for the San Antonio Spurs from 1994 through 1998. His "Rifleman" nickname remained apt, as he not only set the NBA season record for three-pointers by a reserve player, with 164 during the 1994–95 season (a mark surpassed in 2015–16 by the Phoenix Suns' Mirza Teletović), but he also set the Spurs' season record for three-pointers at 190 made during the 1995–96 season (a record that stood until Danny Green surpassed it in 2014–15). Person missed the entire 1996–97 season due to injury.

=== Other teams ===
Person played one season each with the Charlotte Hornets and Seattle SuperSonics before being traded to the Los Angeles Lakers in September 2000 as part of a four-team deal that sent Patrick Ewing to Seattle. However, the Lakers waived Person soon after, and he ended up retiring from the NBA.

== Coaching career ==
=== Cleveland Cavaliers ===
After Person's retirement in 2000, he joined Cleveland Cavaliers head coach John Lucas's staff as an assistant for the 2000–01 NBA season.

=== Indiana Pacers ===
He was then a player-relations assistant and scout to president Donnie Walsh in the Pacers' front office from January 2003 until July 2005, when he moved to an assistant-coaching position within the organization. In 2007, he interviewed unsuccessfully for both the Pacers' and the Sacramento Kings' vacant head-coaching positions.

=== Sacramento Kings ===
Person became an assistant coach for Sacramento in 2007, but he left the Kings after head coach Reggie Theus was fired in mid-December 2008.

After his first season with the Kings, Person was interviewed for the Chicago Bulls' head-coaching vacancy but ultimately was not hired.

Upon leaving Sacramento, Person returned to his home town of Brantley, Alabama in 2008 for an eight-month break after 23 years of playing, administrating, and coaching.

=== Los Angeles Lakers ===
He was invited to be Los Angeles Lakers coach Phil Jackson's assistant in 2009. In March 2010, he interviewed for the head coaching job for the men's team at his alma mater, Auburn University, but was not successful, despite positive feedback. He returned to his job with the Lakers after the interview. Lakers head coach Mike D'Antoni took over from Mike Brown in the middle of the 2012–13 season, and kept all of Brown's assistants, including Person. However, Person was fired after the season; he was the last remaining member from Jackson's Lakers staff.

=== Jeonju KCC Egis ===
In the summer of 2013, Person joined the coaching staff as an associate head coach in South Korea for the Jeonju KCC Egis in the Korean Basketball League.

=== Auburn associate head coach ===
On April 7, 2014, Auburn head coach Bruce Pearl hired Person as an assistant coach. He was promoted to associate head coach in May 2015 and was one of the top assistant coaches and recruiters in the nation before his arrest and subsequent release in September 2017 as part of the 2017–18 NCAA Division I men's basketball corruption scandal.

== Career statistics ==
Legend
GP	Games played	GS	Games started	MPG	Minutes per game
FG%	Field goal percentage	3P%	3-point field goal percentage	FT%	Free throw percentage
RPG	Rebounds per game	APG	Assists per game	SPG	Steals per game
BPG	Blocks per game	PPG	Points per game	**Bold**	Career high
*	Led the league

=== College ===
Year	Team	GP	GS	MPG	FG%	3P%	FT%	RPG	APG	SPG	BPG	PPG
1982–83	Auburn	28	20	22.7	.541	–	.758	4.6	1.3	.5	.2	9.3
1983–84	Auburn	31	31	34.8	.543	–	.728	8.0	1.2	**1.2**	.3	19.1
1984–85	Auburn	**34**	**34**	**36.5**	**.544**	–	.738	**8.9**	**2.0**	**1.2**	**.5**	**22.0**
1985–86	Auburn	33	33	36.2	.519	–	**.804**	7.9	.9	.9	.4	21.5
Career		126	118	32.9	.536	–	.757	7.5	1.4	1.0	.3	18.3

=== NBA ===
==== Regular season ====
Year	Team	GP	GS	MPG	FG%	3P%	FT%	RPG	APG	SPG	BPG	PPG
1986–87	Indiana	**82**	78	36.0	.468	.355	.747	**8.3**	3.6	**1.1**	.2	18.8
1987–88	Indiana	79	71	35.5	.459	.333	.670	6.8	3.9	.9	.1	17.0
1988–89	Indiana	80	79	37.7	.489	.307	**.792**	6.5	3.6	1.0	.2	**21.6**
1989–90	Indiana	77	73	35.2	.487	.372	.781	5.8	3.0	.7	.3	19.7
1990–91	Indiana	80	79	32.1	**.504**	.340	.721	5.2	3.0	.7	.2	18.4
1991–92	Indiana	81	**81**	36.1	.480	.373	.675	5.3	**4.7**	.8	.2	18.5
1992–93	Minnesota	78	75	**38.3**	.433	.355	.649	5.6	4.4	.9	**.4**	16.8
1993–94	Minnesota	77	37	26.4	.422	.368	.759	3.3	2.4	.6	.2	11.6
1994–95	San Antonio	81	1	25.1	.423	.387	.647	3.2	1.3	.6	.1	10.8
1995–96	San Antonio	80	16	26.6	.437	**.410**	.644	5.2	1.3	.6	.3	10.9
1997–98	San Antonio	61	11	23.9	.359	.344	.757	3.3	1.4	.5	.2	6.7
1998–99	Charlotte	50*	21	19.8	.388	.350	.750	2.6	1.2	.4	.2	6.1
1999–00	Seattle	37	0	9.2	.301	.253	.500	1.4	.6	.1	.1	2.8
Career		943	622	30.7	.458	.362	.723	5.1	2.8	.7	.2	14.7

==== Playoffs ====
Year	Team	GP	GS	MPG	FG%	3P%	FT%	RPG	APG	SPG	BPG	PPG
1987	Indiana	4	4	39.8	.514	.250	.769	**8.3**	**5.0**	**1.3**	**.5**	**27.0**
1990	Indiana	3	3	**41.0**	.378	.100	.417	6.7	4.0	.3	.0	13.3
1991	Indiana	5	**5**	38.4	**.533**	**.548**	.810	5.6	3.2	1.0	.0	26.0
1992	Indiana	3	3	39.3	.404	.333	.667	3.0	2.3	.7	.0	17.0
1995	San Antonio	**15**	0	17.2	.351	.289	.727	1.8	.5	.3	**.5**	5.0
1996	San Antonio	10	0	28.4	.532	.532	.824	4.0	1.6	.2	.3	12.1
1998	San Antonio	9	0	21.8	.340	.350	**1.000**	3.0	.8	.4	.0	5.8
2000	Seattle	2	0	1.0	.000	.000	–	.0	.0	.0	.0	.0
Career		51	15	26.1	.448	.391	.737	3.6	1.7	.5	.2	11.3

== Personal life ==
He is the older brother of former NBA player Wesley Person. He was married to Carmen Person. He is the father of two daughters, Millicent and Tiffany and one son, Chuck Jr.

== Guilty plea and sentence ==
Person was arrested by federal law enforcement on September 25, 2017, in Alabama, after being indicted by a federal grand jury on six felony counts: bribery conspiracy, solicitation of bribes and gratuities, conspiracy to commit honest services fraud, honest services wire fraud, conspiracy to commit wire fraud, and travel act conspiracy after allegedly accepting kickbacks for steering student-athletes to financial managers. Person was suspended without pay by Auburn University the day after his arrest and was fired by Auburn University on November 7, 2017. Others were indicted by the U.S. Attorney's Office for the Southern District of New York on corruption charges around the same time.

Person pleaded guilty to a single count of conspiracy to commit bribery on March 19, 2019; as part of the plea agreement, Person agreed to forfeit $91,500. On July 17, 2019, U.S. District Judge Loretta A. Preska sentenced Person to two years of probation and 200 hours of community service, finding that "No purpose would be served by incarceration" and citing Person's long record of giving charity. During the sentencing hearing, Person expressed remorse for taking bribes to steer college athletes to a financial adviser who turned out to be a government informant. Preska rejected prosecutors' argument that Person was motivated by "insatiable greed" and described Person during the sentencing hearing as "charitable to a fault"; she told him, "Keep up the good work."
