= 1984–85 Alabama Crimson Tide men's basketball team =

American college basketball season

1984–85 Alabama Crimson Tide men's basketball

NCAA tournament, Sweet Sixteen
- Conference: Southeastern Conference
- Record: 23–10 (11–7 SEC)
- Head coach: Wimp Sanderson (5th season)
- Home arena: Coleman Coliseum

1984–85 Southeastern Conference men's basketball standings
| | Conf. | | | | Overall |
| Team | W | | L | PCT | W | | L | PCT |
|---|---|---|---|---|---|---|---|---|
| No. 20 LSU | 13 | – | 5 | .722 | 19 | – | 10 | .655 |
| No. 19 Georgia | 12 | – | 6 | .667 | 22 | – | 9 | .710 |
| Alabama | 11 | – | 7 | .611 | 23 | – | 10 | .697 |
| Kentucky | 11 | – | 7 | .611 | 18 | – | 13 | .581 |
| Florida | 9 | – | 9 | .500 | 18 | – | 12 | .600 |
| Mississippi State | 9 | – | 9 | .500 | 13 | – | 15 | .464 |
| Tennessee | 8 | – | 10 | .444 | 22 | – | 15 | .595 |
| Auburn † | 8 | – | 10 | .444 | 22 | – | 12 | .647 |
| Ole Miss | 5 | – | 13 | .278 | 11 | – | 17 | .393 |
| Vanderbilt | 4 | – | 14 | .222 | 11 | – | 17 | .393 |
† 1985 SEC tournament winner Rankings from AP poll

The 1984–85 Alabama Crimson Tide men's basketball team represented the University of Alabama in the 1984-85 NCAA Division I men's basketball season. The team's head coach was Wimp Sanderson, who was in his fifth season at Alabama. The team played their home games at Coleman Coliseum in Tuscaloosa, Alabama. They finished the season 23–10, 11–7 in SEC play, finishing in a tie for third place.

Key additions were freshman forward Derrick McKey, the Tide's lone signee from Meridian High School in Mississippi, and guard Mark Gottfried, a transfer from Oral Roberts University.

The Tide made it to the 1985 SEC men's basketball tournament final, but lost to Auburn. They received an at-large bid to the 1985 NCAA Division I men's basketball tournament, where they defeated Arizona and VCU before losing to North Carolina State in the Sweet Sixteen.

== Roster ==
1984–85 Alabama Crimson Tide men's basketball team
Players
Coaches

| Pos. | # | Name | Height | Weight | Year | Previous school | Hometown |
|---|---|---|---|---|---|---|---|
| F/C | 34 | Bobby Lee Hurt | 6 ft 9 in (2.06 m) | 240 lb (109 kg) | Sr | Huntsville, Alabama |
| F | 24 | Buck Johnson | 6 ft 7 in (2.01 m) | — | Jr | Hayes High School | Birmingham, Alabama |
| G | 23 | Mark Gottfried | 6 ft 4 in (1.93 m) | — | So |
| F/C | 31 | Derrick McKey | 6 ft 9 in (2.06 m) | — | Fr | Meridian High School | Meridian, MS |
| G | 30 | Terry Coner | 6 ft 3 in (1.91 m) | — | So |
| G | 24 | Craig Dudley | 6 ft 4 in (1.93 m) | — | RS So |
| F | | Darrell Neal | 6 ft 8 in (2.03 m) | — |
| C | 51 | Mark Farmer | 6 ft 11 in (2.11 m) | — | Sr |
| F | 21 | Jim Farmer | 6 ft 4 in (1.93 m) | — | So |

Head coach

- Wimp Sanderson

Assistant coach(es)

Legend

- (C) Team captain
- (S) Suspended
- (I) Ineligible
- (W) Walk-on
- Injured
- Current redshirt

== Schedule and results ==
| Date time, TV | Rank^{#} | Opponent^{#} | Result | Record | Site city, state |
Regular Season
| November 26, 1984* | | Bucknell | W 81–56 | 1–0 | Memorial Coliseum; Tuscaloosa, Alabama |
| November 30, 1984* | | Kent State | W 65–64 | 2–0 | Memorial Coliseum; Tuscaloosa, Alabama |
| December 3, 1984* | | East Tennessee State | W 100–76 | 3–0 | Memorial Coliseum; Tuscaloosa, Alabama |
| December 8, 1984* | | Maryland | L 56–59 | 3–1 | Memorial Coliseum; Tuscaloosa, Alabama |
| December 10, 1984* | | Austin Peay | W 68–48 | 4–1 | Memorial Coliseum; Tuscaloosa, Alabama |
| December 17, 1984* | | at Utah | W 73–57 | 5–1 | Jon M. Huntsman Center; Salt Lake City, Utah |
| December 20, 1984* | | Youngstown State | W 88–69 | 6–1 | Memorial Coliseum; Tuscaloosa, Alabama |
| December 27, 1984* | | at New Orleans | W 73–55 | 7–1 | Lakefront Arena; New Orleans, Louisiana |
| December 28, 1984* | | Virginia | W 54–48 | 8–1 | |
| December 30, 1984 | | at No. 18 LSU | L 61–63 | 8–2 (0–1) | Maravich Assembly Center; Baton Rouge, Louisiana |
| January 3, 1985 | | Mississippi State | L 67–71 | 8–3 (0–2) | Memorial Coliseum; Tuscaloosa, Alabama |
| January 5, 1985 | | Georgia | W 87–74 | 9–3 (1–2) | Memorial Coliseum; Tuscaloosa, Alabama |
| January 9, 1985 | | LSU | W 79–67 | 10–3 (2–2) | Memorial Coliseum; Tuscaloosa, Alabama |
| January 12, 1985 | | Kentucky | W 60–58 | 11–3 (3–2) | Memorial Coliseum; Tuscaloosa, Alabama |
| January 16, 1985 | | at Auburn | W 60–55 | 12–3 (4–2) | Memorial Coliseum; Auburn, Alabama |
| January 19, 1985 | | at Tennessee | L 67–79 | 12–4 (4–3) | Stokely Center; Knoxville, Tennessee |
| January 23, 1985 | | Vanderbilt | W 79–77 | 13–4 (5–3) | Memorial Coliseum; Tuscaloosa, Alabama |
| January 26, 1985 | | at Florida | L 77–86 | 13–5 (5–4) | O'Connell Center; Gainesville, Florida |
| January 30, 1985 | | Ole Miss | W 54–47 | 14–5 (6–4) | Memorial Coliseum; Tuscaloosa, Alabama |
| February 2, 1985 | | at Mississippi State | L 46–48 | 14–6 (6–5) | Humphrey Coliseum; Starkville, Mississippi |
| February 6, 1985 | | at Georgia | L 70–74 | 14–7 (6–6) | Stegeman Coliseum; Athens, Georgia |
| February 13, 1985 | | at Kentucky | L 48–51 | 14–8 (6–7) | Rupp Arena; Lexington, Kentucky |
| February 16, 1985 | | Auburn | W 74–72 | 15–8 (7–7) | Memorial Coliseum; Tuscaloosa, Alabama |
| February 20, 1985 | | Tennessee | W 80–59 | 16–8 (8–7) | Memorial Coliseum; Tuscaloosa, Alabama |
| February 23, 1985 | | at Vanderbilt | W 81–56 | 17–8 (9–7) | Memorial Gymnasium; Nashville, Tennessee |
| February 27, 1985 | | Florida | W 81–66 | 18–8 (10–7) | Memorial Coliseum; Tuscaloosa, Alabama |
| March 2, 1985 | | at Ole Miss | W 61–49 | 19–8 (11–7) | Tad Smith Coliseum; Oxford, Mississippi |
SEC Tournament
| March 7, 1985 | (3) | (6) Mississippi State; Second Round | W 42–31 | 20–8 | Birmingham-Jefferson Civic Center; Birmingham, Alabama |
| March 8, 1985 | (3) | (2) No. 17 Georgia; Semifinals | W 74–53 | 21–8 | Birmingham-Jefferson Civic Center; Birmingham, Alabama |
| March 9, 1985 | (3) | (8) Auburn; SEC Championship | L 49–53 | 21–9 | Birmingham-Jefferson Civic Center; Birmingham, Alabama |
NCAA Tournament
| March 15, 1985* | (7 W) | (10 W) Arizona; First Round | W 50–41 | 22–9 | University Arena; Albuquerque, New Mexico |
| March 17, 1985* | (7 W) | (2 W) No. 11 VCU; Second Round | W 63–59 | 23–9 | University Arena; Albuquerque, New Mexico |
| March 22, 1985* | (7 W) | (3 W) No. 16 NC State; Sweet Sixteen | L 55–61 | 23–10 | McNichols Sports Arena; Denver, Colorado |
*Non-conference game. ^{#}Rankings from AP poll. (#) Tournament seedings in parentheses. SE=Southeast.
