= National Register of Historic Places listings in Crawford County, Georgia =

This is a list of properties and districts in Crawford County, Georgia that are listed on the National Register of Historic Places (NRHP).

This National Park Service list is complete through NPS recent listings posted May 1, 2026.

== Current listings ==
	Name on the Register	Image	Date listed	Location	City or town	Description
1	Crawford County Courthouse	Crawford County Courthouse	September 18, 1980 (#80001008)	U.S. 80; 32°43′28″N 83°59′53″W	Knoxville	
2	Crawford County Jail	Crawford County Jail	May 18, 1989 (#89000418)	GA 42; 32°43′27″N 83°59′44″W	Knoxville	
3	The Georgia Post Building	The Georgia Post Building	May 1, 2013 (#13000214)	100 GA 42 S. 32°43′27″N 83°59′50″W	Knoxville	
4	Col. Benjamin Hawkins Gravesite	Col. Benjamin Hawkins Gravesite	November 10, 2011 (#11000790)	Benjamin Hawkins Rd. 32°40′01″N 84°05′44″W	Roberta	
5	Roberta Historic District	Roberta Historic District	May 19, 1989 (#89000365)	Roughly bounded by E. Cruselle St., Kirby St., Agency St., and Mather St. 32°43′07″N 84°00′40″W	Roberta	
6	Williams-Moore-Hillsman House	Williams-Moore-Hillsman House	June 14, 2001 (#01000645)	West Hopewell Rd. at Colbert Rd, 32°45′44″N 84°07′35″W	Roberta	
