= Troutman =

Troutman is a surname. Notable people with the surname include:

- Arenda Troutman (born 1957), American politician
- Baxter Troutman (born 1966), American politician
- Beth Troutman (born 1977), American television personality
- Chevon Troutman (born 1981), American basketball player
- Emanuel Mac Troutman (1915–2004), American judge
- Ivy Troutman (1884–1979), Broadway actress
- Joanna Troutman (1818–1879), designer of the Troutman flag
- Johnnie Troutman (born 1987), American football player
- Kathryn Troutman (born 1947), American author
- Larry Troutman (1944–1999), percussionist of Zapp
- Roger Troutman (1951–1999), lead singer of Zapp
- Shirley Troutman (born 1959/1960), American lawyer
- William I. Troutman (1905–1971), American politician

== See also ==
- Troutman, North Carolina
- Trautmann
