= Crawford County School District =

School district in Georgia (U.S. state)

Address
- 190 East Crusselle Street Roberta, Georgia, 31078-4865; United States
- Coordinates: 32.7248°N 84.007628°W

District information
- Grades: Pre-school - 12
- Superintendent: Anthony Aikens
- Accreditation(s): Southern Association of Colleges and Schools; Georgia Accrediting Commission

Students and staff
- Enrollment: 2,090
- Faculty: 127

Other information
- Telephone: (478) 836-3131
- Fax: (478) 836-3114
- Website: www.crawfordschools.org

The Crawford County School District is a public school district in Crawford County, Georgia, United States, based in Roberta. It serves the communities of Knoxville, Musella, and Roberta.

== Schools ==
The Crawford County School District has one elementary school, one middle school, and one high school.

=== Elementary school ===
- Crawford County Elementary School

=== Middle school ===
- Crawford County Middle School

=== High school ===
- Crawford County High School
