= Williams-Moore-Hillsman House =

- U.S. National Register of Historic Places
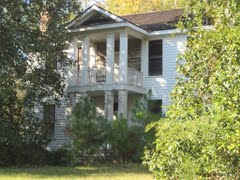

- Location within Georgia
- Nearest city: Roberta, Georgia
- Coordinates: 32°45′44″N 84°07′35″W
- Area: 24.9 acres (10.1 ha)
- Built: 1827
- Architectural style: Georgian Revival, Early Republic
- NRHP reference No.: 01000645
- Added to NRHP: June 14, 2001

The Williams-Moore-Hillsman House, in Crawford County, Georgia near Roberta, Georgia, was built in 1827. It was listed on the National Register of Historic Places in 2001.

The main house, also known as the John Williams House, is a two-story house with a two-story pedimented portico.

The listing included two contributing buildings and a contributing site on 24.9 acres (10.1 ha). The second building is a small house believed to be a slave dwelling.

It is located on West Hopewell Rd. at Colbert Rd.
