= Kenny Walker (basketball) =

American basketball player (born 1964)

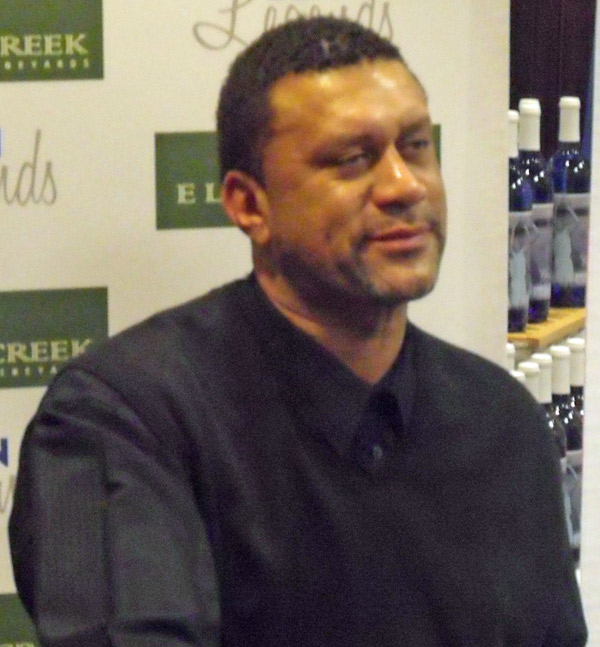
- Walker at an autograph signing in 2012

Personal information
- Born: August 18, 1964 (age 62) Roberta, Georgia, U.S.
- Listed height: 6 ft 8 in (2.03 m)
- Listed weight: 210 lb (95 kg)

Career information
- High school: Crawford County (Roberta, Georgia)
- College: Kentucky (1982–1986)
- NBA draft: 1986: 1st round, 5th overall pick
- Drafted by: New York Knicks
- Playing career: 1986–1997
- Position: Small forward
- Number: 34, 7, 15

Career history
- 1986–1991: New York Knicks
- 1991–1992: Granollers
- 1993: Teamsystem Fabriano
- 1993: Cáceres
- 1993–1995: Washington Bullets
- 1996–1997: Isuzu Motors Lynx Gigacats / Isuzu Gigacats

Career highlights
- NBA Slam Dunk Contest champion (1989); JBL Best5 (1996); Consensus first-team All-American (1986); Consensus second-team All-American (1985); 2× SEC Player of the Year (1985, 1986); 2× First-team All-SEC (1985, 1986); Second-team All-SEC (1984); No. 34 honored by Kentucky Wildcats; Third-team Parade All-American (1982); McDonald's All-American (1982); Mr. Georgia Basketball (1982)

Career NBA statistics
- Points: 3,128 (7.0 ppg)
- Rebounds: 1,793 (4.0 rpg)
- Stats at NBA.com
- Stats at Basketball Reference
Medals
Men's basketball
Representing the United States
FIBA U19 World Championship
Gold medal – first place	1983 Palma de Mallorca	National team

Kenneth Walker (born August 18, 1964) is an American former professional basketball player. He played primarily for the New York Knicks of the National Basketball Association (NBA). Nicknamed "Sky" Walker, he won the NBA Slam Dunk Contest in 1989. He is currently a radio host for WVLK in Lexington, Kentucky.

Walker played college basketball for the Kentucky Wildcats. He was a first-team consensus All-American as a senior in 1986, and twice he was named the player of the year in the Southeastern Conference (SEC). He was selected by the Knicks in the first round of the 1986 NBA draft with the fifth overall pick.

== Early life ==
Walker was born in Roberta, Georgia, where he attended Crawford County High School. He was named Mr. Basketball in his home state of Georgia in 1982.

== College career ==
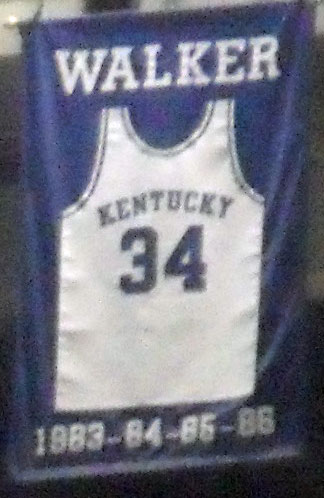
Kenny Walker's jersey was retired by the University of Kentucky. This banner hangs in Rupp Arena.

Walker chose to play collegiately at the University of Kentucky, where he was named to an All-SEC team four times and the All-American team twice. Walker's 1984 Kentucky team made it to the Final Four of the NCAA Tournament before losing to the Georgetown Hoyas.

In 1986, Walker set a record by scoring 11 times on 11 field goal attempts in the NCAA tournament.

== Professional career ==
Walker was selected with the 5th pick of the 1986 NBA draft by the New York Knicks. Walker played for five coaches in five years with the Knicks. On February 11, 1989, Walker won the NBA Slam Dunk Contest, competing three days after the death of his father. He also secured third place in the 1990 contest. However, his success on the court was dwindling, and knee injuries forced him to leave the NBA and join the ACB league in Spain.

Walker returned to the NBA in 1993 to play two seasons with the Washington Bullets as a role player. He played a season (c.1998) for the Isuzu Motors Lynx/Giga Cats in Japan before retiring from professional basketball.

== Post-retirement ==
From 2000 to 2021, Walker was the co-host of "Cat Talk," a syndicated radio call-in show with Wes Strader.

Walker lives in Lexington, and is active in the community, doing local radio and promoting childhood literacy.

Walker is a member of the 2018 Georgia Sports Hall of Fame in a class that includes former NFL star Champ Bailey, and Atlanta Falcons owner Arthur Blank.

== Career statistics ==
Legend
GP	Games played	GS	Games started	MPG	Minutes per game
FG%	Field goal percentage	3P%	3-point field goal percentage	FT%	Free throw percentage
RPG	Rebounds per game	APG	Assists per game	SPG	Steals per game
BPG	Blocks per game	PPG	Points per game	**Bold**	Career high

=== NBA ===
==== Regular season ====
Year	Team	GP	GS	MPG	FG%	3P%	FT%	RPG	APG	SPG	BPG	PPG
1986–87	New York	68	**64**	25.3	.491	.000	.757	**5.0**	**1.1**	.7	.7	**10.4**
1987–88	New York	**82**	61	**26.1**	.473	.000	.775	4.7	1.0	**.8**	.7	10.1
1988–89	New York	79	2	14.7	.489	.250	.776	2.9	.5	.5	.6	5.3
1989–90	New York	68	21	23.5	**.531**	**.400**	.723	**5.0**	.7	.5	**.8**	7.9
1990–91	New York	54	8	14.3	.435	.000	**.780**	2.9	.2	.3	.6	4.3
1993–94	Washington	73	4	19.1	.482	.000	.696	4.0	.5	.4	**.8**	4.9
1994–95	Washington	24	0	11.1	.429	–	.750	2.0	.3	.2	.2	2.4
Career		448	160	20.2	.485	.206	.749	4.0	.7	.5	.7	7.0

==== Playoffs ====
Year	Team	GP	GS	MPG	FG%	3P%	FT%	RPG	APG	SPG	BPG	PPG
1988	New York	4	**2**	**20.0**	.333	–	**1.000**	2.3	**1.3**	**.5**	**.8**	**4.5**
1989	New York	9	0	10.0	.231	–	.737	1.8	.2	.1	.3	2.2
1990	New York	**10**	**2**	15.4	**.552**	.000	.643	**2.5**	.6	.0	.4	4.1
1991	New York	3	0	10.3	.500	–	**1.000**	2.3	.7	.3	.3	3.3
Career		26	4	13.7	.419	.000	.730	2.2	.6	.2	.4	3.4
