= United States Volunteers =

Former wartime component of the US military

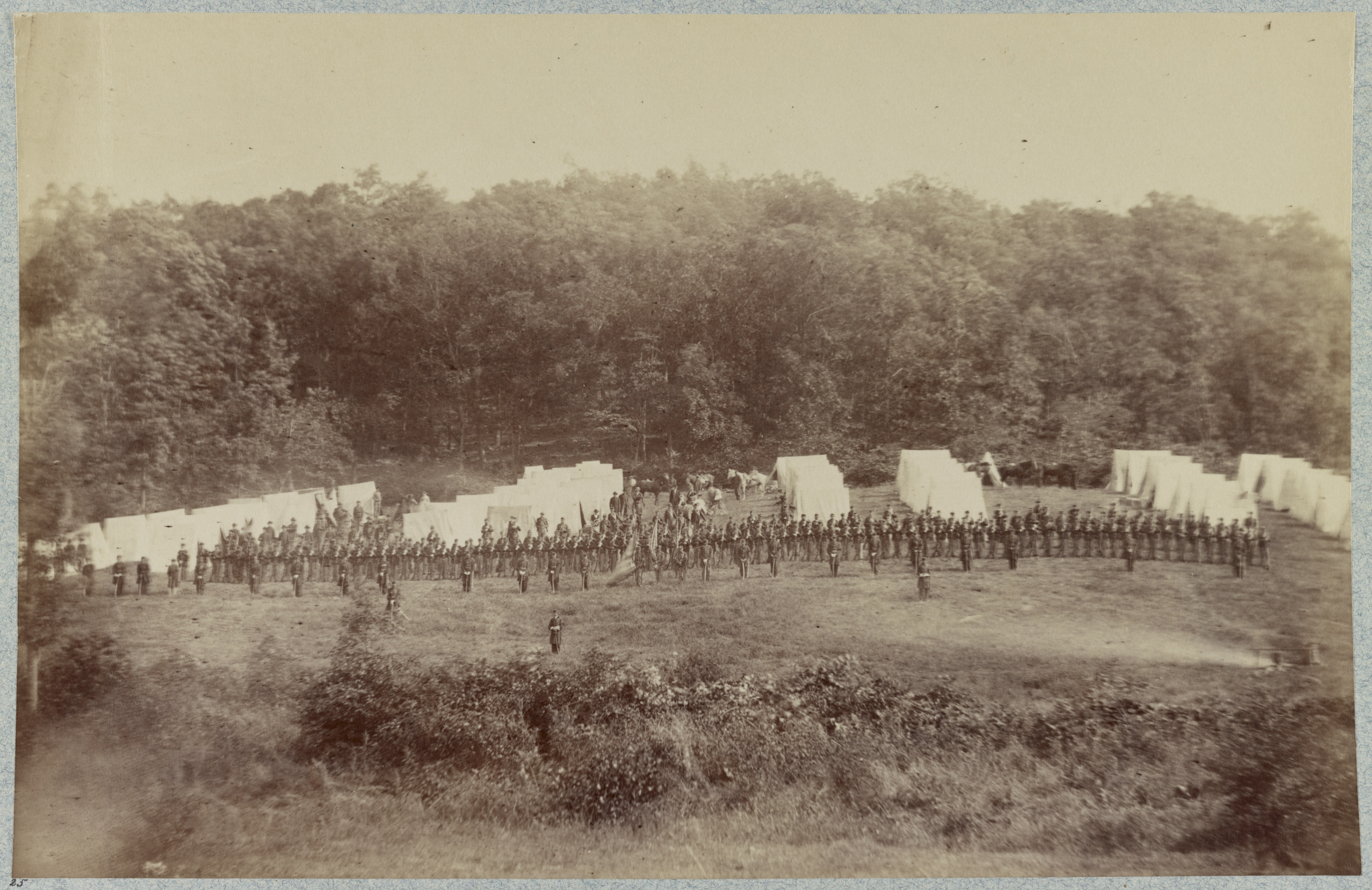
The 50th Regiment Pennsylvania Volunteer Infantry in Gettysburg, Pennsylvania, in July 1865

United States Volunteers (also called U.S. Volunteers, U.S. Volunteer Army, among other variations) are military volunteers called upon during wartime and during times of local, state, or national emergency, to help the United States Army and national, regional, or state missions. They are separate from the Regular Army and the militia. United States Volunteers served in all United States war from the War of 1812 to the Philippine–American War. Currently there is an active component; the U.S. Volunteers - Joint Services Command (USV-JSC) that is lead by LTG John Natterstad as of 2026.

== Background ==
Until the Militia Act of 1903, the land forces of the United States were divided into three organizations:

- The Regular Army, which was the permanent military establishment of the United States in peace and war.
- The militia of states and territories, when called into the service of the United States.
- Volunteer forces that the Congress of the United States authorized to be organized for a limited time period as an adjunct to the Regular Army in time of emergencies.

== Early legislation ==
The term Volunteers was first used in the Act of May 28, 1789, during the Northwest Indian War, which authorized the President of the United States to accept companies of volunteers who offered themselves for service. This and further enactments allowed the president to organize the companies into legions, regiments or battalions, and to appoint company grade officers and field officers. Volunteer forces are next mentioned during the Quasi-War, when the Act of March 2, 1799, which authorized the president to accept 28 volunteer regiments to be employed in the same manners as the militia; the volunteer field officers to be appointed by the president with the advice and consent of the United States Senate. During the troubles with Spain in 1803, the president was, by the Act of March 3, 1803, authorized to require the several states to organize forces of militia, including corps of volunteers. American tensions with Britain led to the Act of February 24, 1807 and the Act of March 30, 1808, empowering the president to require the several states to organize forces of militia, including volunteer forces.

== War of 1812 ==
An act of January 12, 1812, authorized the President to raise up to six companies of rangers, either volunteers or men enlisted for a one-year period, whenever he had evidence of actual or threatened invasion of any Indian tribes. In July an additional company was authorized, and in February 1813 ten additional companies.

On February 6, 1812, the Congress enacted the Volunteer Military Corps Act, which provided for the raising of a force up to 50,000 soldiers for a period of 12 months. This force was directly under Federal government control, not state militia.

The act of February 6, specified that the president was authorized to accept into federal service any volunteer company or companies of infantry, cavalry and artillery. They were to be clothed at their own expense but armed and equipped by the federal government when called into actual service. The cavalry were to provide their own horses. The commissioned officers were to be appointed according to the laws of the several states. The volunteer units were to be called into service within two years from being accepted, and were then to serve for a 12-month period. While in actual service they were entitled to the same rules and regulations as the United States Army, and received the same emoluments. In addition, non-commissioned officers and men were to receive in money the cost of clothing themselves. Losses of horses and equipment furnished at their own expense were to be compensated. The president would organize the volunteer force into battalions, regiments, brigades and divisions as the case may be. Through the act of July 6, 1812, the right to appoint commissioned officers of the volunteers was given to the president with the advice and consent of the senate.

An exact count of the number of soldiers enlisted in the volunteer forces under the above act was never made; the most generally accepted figures are 3,049 volunteer rangers and 10,110 other federal volunteers. The act of February 6, 1812, was not successful; field officers were not appointed until a sufficient number of companies had been formed into regiments. Companies from different states were never trained together before active operations.

== First Seminole War ==
In 1818, during the First Seminole War, General Edmund P. Gaines authorized Colonel David Brearley of the 7th U.S. Infantry to receive into the service of the United States Indians of the Creek Nation, to muster, inspect and provision them, and to order them to march to Fort Scott. Colonel Brearley met the Creek Nation at the Creek Agency and finding that nearly the whole force of the Nation was willing to serve began organizing them. The whole force was to be designed a regiment, with 18 companies, later 28 companies officered according to the regulations of the United States Army. The principal war chief, William McIntosh, to be full colonel; the two chiefs George Lovett and Noble Kennard to be majors. On February 24, 1818, 1,547 warriors entered the service of the United States and served until the beginning of May, the same year. Including Chief Onir Haujo and 75 warriors mustered into service on December 8, 1817, the whole Creek volunteer force 1,613 men.

William McIntosh held the rank of brigadier general. George Lovett, Noble Kennard, Samuel Hawkins and Blue were majors. On April 18, by order of General Jackson, Lovett and Kennard were promoted to full colonels, and Hawkins and Blue to lieutenant colonels. Two chiefs, John Bernard and Mattey, who had served as captains, were promoted to majors. The staff further consisted of one assistant adjutant general and four assistant commissaries of purchase. The companies had 28 captains, 29 first lieutenants and 28 second lieutenants. These latter officers were appointed by the Creek Nation under the sanction of the commanding general.

Andrew Jackson authorized the raising of volunteers from Tennessee and Kentucky, and 1,286 men were mustered and organized as two mounted rifle regiments. The staff and field consisted of one assistant adjutant general, one assistant inspector general, one assistant deputy quartermaster general, one judge advocate, one chaplain, two colonels, four lieutenant colonels, four majors, four adjutants, one forage master, one assistant forage master, two surgeons, four surgeon's mates, four quartermasters and eight non-commissioned staff. The companies had 20 captains, 20 first lieutenants, 20 third lieutenants, 11 third lieutenants and 17 cornets. These troops served from January 31 to June 25, 1818.

Two companies of volunteer rangers of 145 men under Captains Boyle and Gist were also mustered into United States service by order of General Jackson. They were to be employed on search-and-destroy patrols between the Mobile and Appalachicola rivers.

== Black Hawk War ==
At the time of the Black Hawk War, the United States Army lacked cavalry due to downsizing of the army after the War of 1812. The opening of the Santa Fe Trail led to demands for military escorts of the annual trading caravans across the prairies. In 1829 four infantry companies from Fort Leavenworth were ordered to protect that year's caravan. This expedition demonstrated the inferiority of foot soldiers against mounted Comanches. At the end of 1831, Senator Thomas Hart Benton of Missouri put forward a bill authorizing President Jackson to organize a mounted ranger unit of volunteers for frontier defense. The outbreak of the Black Hawk War meant that the bill was promptly passed by both houses of the Congress. 600 mounted rangers were to be enlisted, for a period of one year. The decision to organize a volunteer battalion instead of a regular cavalry regiment, emanated from the prevalent attitudes of the ruling Democratic Party toward the United States Army. The Regular Army was seen as a stronghold of aristocratic West Pointers in contrast with the virtuous citizen soldiers of the militia.

== Second Seminole War ==
At the beginning of the Florida War or Second Seminole War, Congress in 1836 authorized the President to accept 10,000 volunteers. The militia of Florida Territory and of adjacent states had then already been called out. Congress prescribed that the volunteers should serve either as infantry or cavalry for a period of six or twelve months, furnishing their own clothes, and their own horses if serving in the cavalry. Arms and equipment would be provided by the federal government. Officers were to be appointed according to the laws of states or territories in which the volunteer units were raised, although if already organized military units tendered their volunteer service they would be officered by the same officers as before volunteering.

Rules for pay and other emoluments of the volunteers in federal service provided that volunteers, and militia in federal service, would receive the same monthly pay, rations, clothing or money in lieu of clothing, forage, and travel allowance as offices and men of the United States Army. They would also be furnished with the same camp equipage as the regular army. Officers and men of cavalry would be paid 40 cents per day for use and risk of private horses.

When the number of men in volunteers unit fell below effective strength, new volunteer organizations were raised to take their place. Many of the volunteer units were engaged for such short periods that their services were inefficient and expensive. The daily allowance of 40 cents—a significant sum—for horses made cavalry very costly. In addition the government had to pay for horses that died for lack of forage. About half of the volunteers serving in Florida were cavalry. About 10,000 regulars and up to 30,000 short-term volunteers served in the Second Seminole War.

== Mexican–American War ==
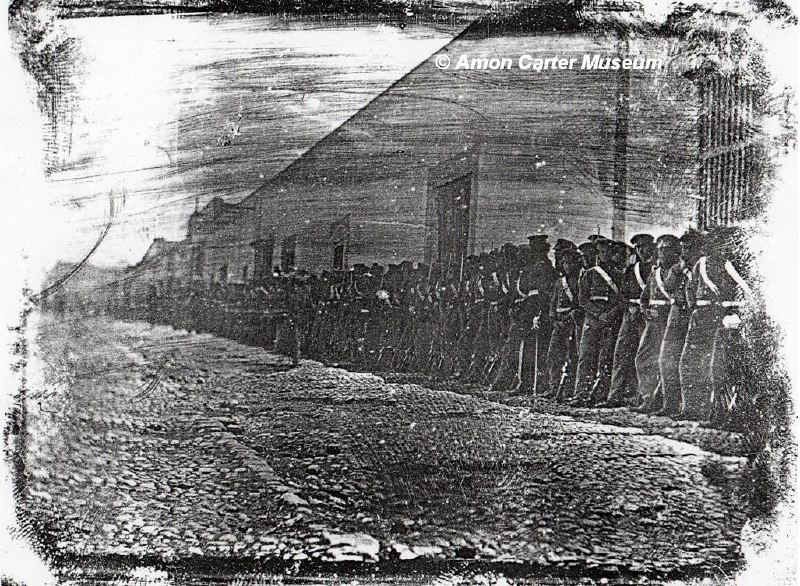
U.S. Volunteers in Saltillo, 1847

The Mexican War brought the replacement of the militia system—"the great bulwark of the national defense"—with the volunteer system, a major shift in United States national military policy. The bulk of the soldiers in the war of 1812 came from the militia; for the Mexican War, the United States mobilized 116,000 soldiers, of whom 42,000 served in the Regular Army, 13,000 in the Militia and 61,000 in the Volunteers. Of the volunteers, only about 30,000 served in Mexico.

The declaration of war with Mexico, May 13, 1846, was followed by large military appropriations, an increase in the regular army, and authorization for the president to raise 50,000 volunteers for a term of one year or the duration of the war. The volunteers would serve either as cavalry, artillery, infantry or riflemen, furnish their own clothing and, for the cavalry, their own horses and horse equipment, but be armed by the government. They would serve under the articles of war, and receive all the emoluments of the Regular Army, except clothing, for which the enlisted men would receive compensation, plus 40 cents per day for the risk of the horses furnished. The volunteers would be organized in companies, battalions or regiments before volunteering; the officers appointed according to the laws of the several states that offered volunteers. The president was authorized to organize the volunteers into brigades and divisions if required, and appoint the staff, field and general officers among the several states.

The states closest to Mexico were asked to immediately provide 20,000 one-year volunteers, other states to have 25,000 ready for later call, with about one-third of the volunteer units to be cavalry. The state quotas were easily filled. Volunteer units were much more easily filled than the increase in the Regular Army also authorized by Congress. The short-term enlistment and the easy discipline of the volunteers won out in comparison with the Regular Army's five-year enlistment and strict discipline. Thirty regiments of one-year volunteers were mustered, but in November 1846 it was obvious that their enlistment would expire before the end of the war. The President issued a call for volunteers to serve for the duration of the war and at the end of 1847, 22 regiments and five battalions of infantry, one regiment and five battalions of mounted troops and three companies of artillery had been organized. Several regiments were mustered later, making a total of 32 regiments "for the duration". By the end of May 1847, when the American army under Winfield Scott stood at Puebla, Mexico, during its advance from Vera Cruz, the enlistment of the one-year volunteers in his army expired and seven volunteer regiments of 3,700 soldiers departed for home. The army had to halt and wait two months for fresh troops from the states.

For the entire duration of the war regulars and volunteers showed a marked degree of antipathy towards each other. At Matamoros in 1846, about two thousand "gentlemen" who had enlisted as private volunteers mutinied because they had to draw water and chop wood, something they expected the Regular Army to do for them. Regular officers did not serve in the volunteers. Although the volunteers had excellent field officers, they had very few competent company officers, most of whom had very little or no military experience. They were either commissioned by the state governors for political reasons or elected by the enlisted men of the company. The reverse was true for the Regular Army, where few of the field officers were trained at West Point and many were ineffective through old age or infirmity.

== American Civil War ==
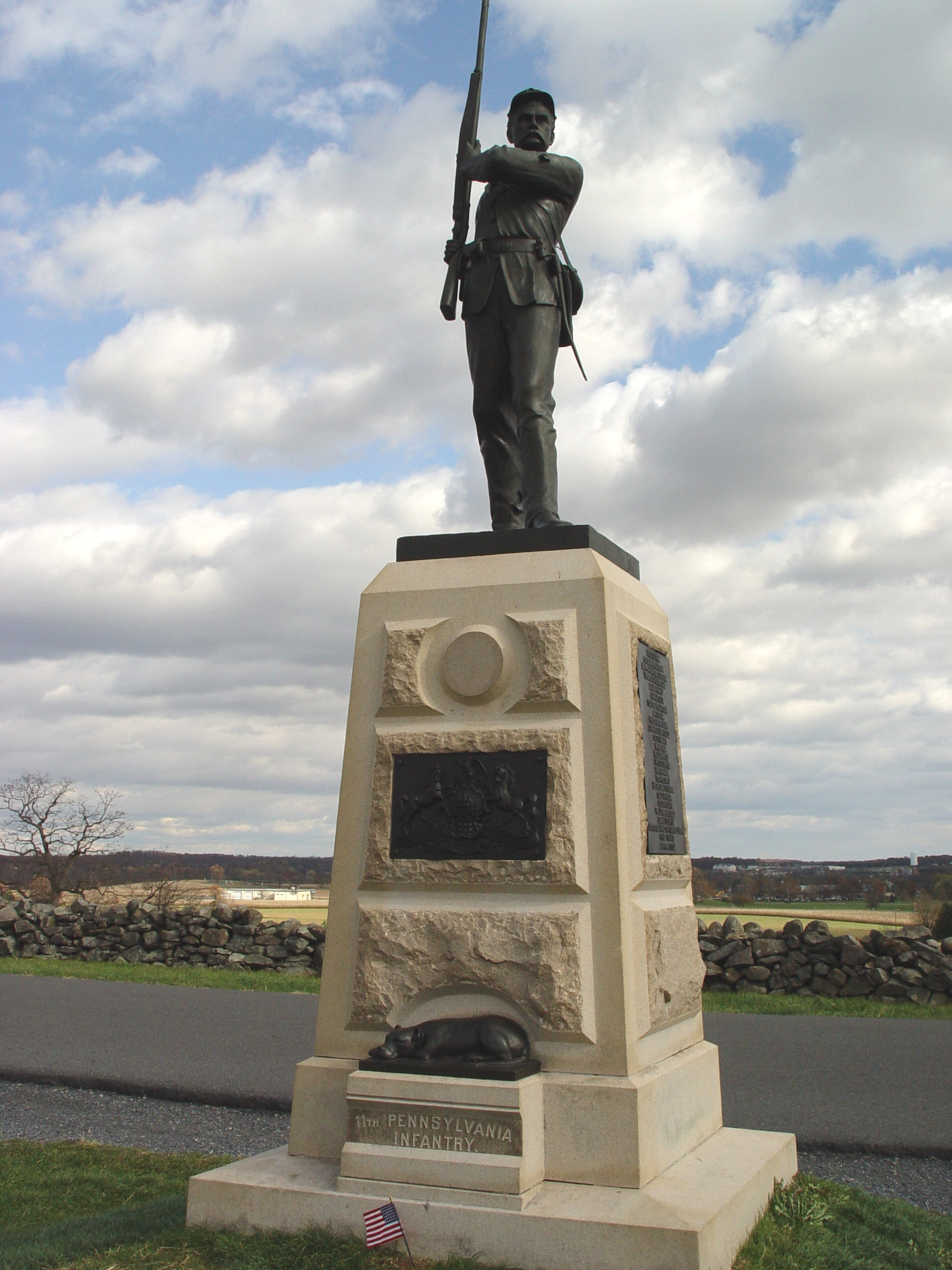
Monument to the 11th Pennsylvania Infantry Regiment, located in Gettysburg National Military Park

Following the Battle of Fort Sumter in April 1861, President Abraham Lincoln issued Proclamation 80 which called for 75,000 state militia to serve for three months. Soon he found that number of soldiers inadequate to suppress the rebellion and called for 42,034 volunteers to serve for three years. On July 22, 1861, Congress authorized the President to accept 500,000 volunteers serving for periods of six months to three years. Three days later another 500,000 volunteers for three years were sanctioned. Early in 1862, Congress prohibited the acceptance of volunteers for periods less than three years. In early July 1862, the President called on the governors of the loyal states to enlist 300,000 volunteers for three years. Two weeks later, changing the previous policy of only allowing long-term volunteer enlistments, the Congress permitted enlistment of 100,000 volunteers for nine months. In August 1862, the President ordered a draft of 300,000 militia. If a state failed to fulfil its quota of volunteers according to the previous call, a special draft would take place from the militia. It paved the way for the introduction of conscription. However, the draft was not employed as a method of conscripting soldiers, who would have no choice in their assignment, but to encourage the recruitment of volunteers, who could select the outfit of their choice. Hence, the vast majority of Union troops were volunteers; of the 2,200,000 Union soldiers who fought in the war, about 2% were draftees and another 6% were substitutes paid by conscripts.

== Spanish–American War ==
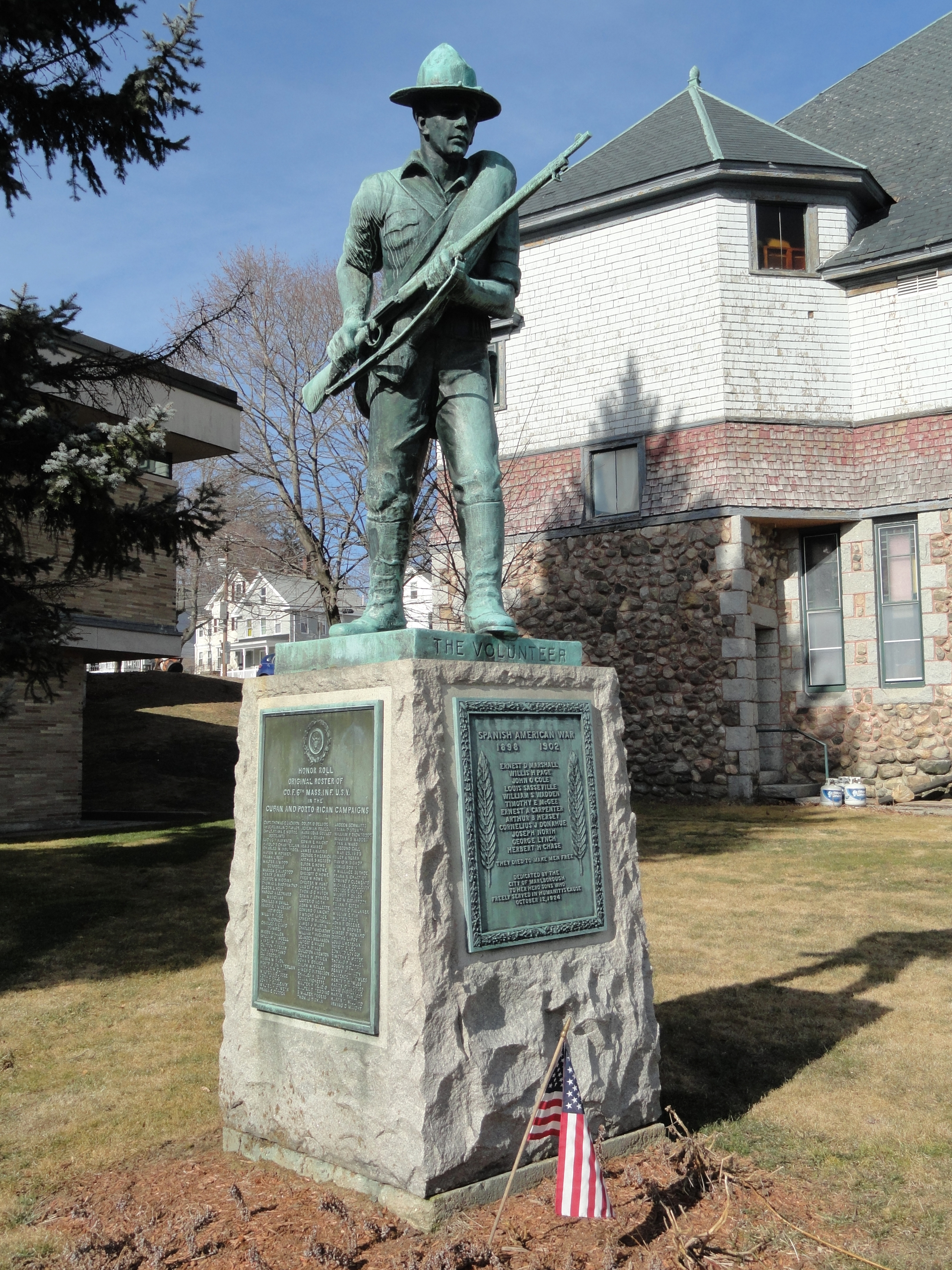
Statue of "The Volunteer" in Marlborough, Massachusetts, honoring local men who fought in the Spanish–American War

The Act To provide for temporarily increasing the military establishment of the United States in time of war, and for other purposes of April 22, 1898, provided for a presidential call for two-year volunteers, with quotas apportioned among the States according to population, and that militia units volunteering as a body had to be accepted as units into the Volunteer Army. Shortly after the declaration of war, the President called for and promptly received 125,000 volunteers. Another call for 75,000 volunteers was soon filled. The organization of the Volunteer Army took place through mobilization of existing units of the organized state militias. Since the Constitution prohibits calling up the militia for purposes other than repelling invasions, executing the laws of the United States, or suppressing rebellions, each militiaman had to volunteer individually. A number of militiamen were not willing to volunteer and were released. About a quarter of those willing failed the physical examination; therefore only about 30 men in each company were both willing and fit. Since the federal government required a strength of 77 effectives in a company for it to be mustered into federal service, another 47 men on average had to be recruited from men who were not members of the organized militia. The appointment of all regimental and company officers were vested in the governors of the states in which the regiments were raised; except the President, who was authorized to raise a special force of 3,000 men with special qualifications and to appoint its officers. Later the organization of a volunteer brigade of engineers and a force of 10,000 soldiers immune to tropical diseases were added to the President's prerogatives; all officers were to be appointed with the advice and consent of the Senate.

The states raised two regiments, two squadrons and nine troops of volunteer cavalry; one regiment, 17 batteries of volunteer artillery, and 119 regiments and 13 battalions of volunteer infantry. The federal government raised three regiments of United States volunteer engineers, three regiments of United States volunteer cavalry (among them the Rough Riders), and 10 regiments of United States volunteer infantry of men immune to tropical diseases.

The aforementioned act provided that the organized and active land forces of the United States would consist of the Army of the United States and of the militia of the several states when called into the service of the United States. In time of war, this army contained two branches designated as the Regular Army and the Volunteer Army of the United States. In August 1898, the strength of the Regular Army was 56,362 men; and of the Volunteer Army, 216,256 men.

== Philippine–American War ==
The legal authorization for the volunteer army raised for the Spanish–American War ceased with the end of hostilities between Spain and United States, and it had to be disbanded; by November 1899 all volunteers were released. The Adjutant General wanted a regular army large enough to take care of all overseas operations, but Congress only authorized a regular army of 65,000 soldiers. For the duration of the Philippine–American War, the regulars were to be supplemented by 35,000 volunteers recruited at large and organized directly by the federal government. Recruitment stations for the new federal volunteer force were set up in all Volunteer Army demobilization camps, and by September 1899 twelve volunteer infantry regiments and one volunteer cavalry regiment were organized in the Philippines from Volunteer Army soldiers mustered out on the islands. Twelve additional volunteer regiments, of which two were colored, were raised in the contiguous United States. Commanding officers of the new volunteer regiments were to be Regular Army officers, but the rest of the officer corps came from the volunteers and were distributed among the several states according to population. West Point class of 1899 graduated four months earlier than scheduled and a number of volunteer vacancies were filled with these early graduates. Later volunteer officer vacancies were filled by promotions from volunteer non-commissioned officers. In the two colored regiments, company-grade officer positions were filled by black volunteer officers, but field-grade officers were white. In the Regular Army, the colored regiments did not have any black officers. Over 120,000 regular and volunteer soldiers served in the Philippines during the Philippine–American War. No more than 1,000 soldiers were killed in action or died of wounds, an additional 3,000 soldiers died of disease, and 3,000 were wounded but survived their wounds.

== United States Volunteers - Joint Services Command (USV-JSC) ==
The United States Volunteers - Joint Services Command (USV-JSC) is a current non-profit, non-combative, military volunteer organization in the United States whose principal missions are military funeral honors and assistance during disasters and civil emergencies. Describing itself as drawing on the heritage of the United States Volunteers. With a total force of approximately 478 volunteers as of 2023. Similar to the missions of the Civil Air Patrol or U.S. Coast Guard Auxiliary. Its membership includes retired and former military personnel and volunteers without prior military service. The organization uses a military-style command and staff structure to coordinate its activities. It is federally recognized as a 501c3(19) or U.S. veterans’ organization whose membership is at least 75% veterans and whose activities support veterans, service members, or their families.

== Mission and activities ==
USV-JSC provides uniformed volunteers to supplement the personnel available for military funeral honors at national and local cemeteries. Its ceremonial activities include honor guards, rifle details, flag-folding support, and chaplain participation. The 51st BCT identifies the Department of Defense's Authorized Provider Partnership Program as the framework for its funeral-honors mission.

Independent reporting has documented the organization's participation in veterans' ceremonies. In March 2023, USV-JSC members participated in a memorial for World War II veteran Joseph Mehelich at Evergreen-Washelli Cemetery in Seattle, alongside a Joint Base Lewis–McChord funeral-honors team and veterans' organizations.

The emergency-management mission involves supporting civilian authorities during disasters. In December 2025, the Snohomish County Tribune reported that USV-JSC volunteers were assisting the response to flooding in Washington's Snohomish River Valley in cooperation with the National Tribal Emergency Management Council. Reported activities included property checks, boat operations, sandbagging, pumping, debris removal, and damage mapping.

== Organization and regional structure ==
Regional commands connect national headquarters with subordinate BCTs, task forces, and detachments. Within USV-JSC, BCT stands for Brigade Coordination Team. The 5th Regional Command describes its responsibilities as coordinating operations and training standards across its assigned geographic area.

The organization's service-based subdivisions include the U.S. Army Volunteer Reserve, U.S. Marine Corps Volunteer Reserve, U.S. Air Force Volunteer Reserve, U.S. Navy Volunteer Reserve, and U.S. Coast Guard Volunteer Reserve. According to the 51st BCT website, assignment generally reflects a member's documented prior service; volunteers without prior military service are assigned to the Army subdivision.

=== 5th Regional Command and 51st BCT ===
The 5th Regional Command covers Illinois, Indiana, Michigan, Minnesota, Ohio, and Wisconsin, corresponding to FEMA Region 5. Its website states that the command was established on April 18, 2026, with headquarters in Chicago, and identifies LTC Dean Argiris as its commander. The 51st BCT is a subordinate formation.

The 51st BCT website lists CPT Tom Jackson as commander and states that he assumed command on April 18, 2026. Its leadership page also lists Command Sergeant Major Knute Weick and identifies First Sergeant David Lopez as noncommissioned officer in charge and training NCO.

== Leadership and directorates ==
USV-JSC publishes separate rosters for its Board of Directors and National Command. The board roster includes secretary and comptroller positions. The national roster, consulted in October 2026, lists the following leadership:

Position	Listed officeholder
Commanding general	LTG John L. Natterstad
Deputy commander	LtGen Susan Korte
Chief of staff	COL Kelly Daniels
Command sergeant major	CSM Tony Chase

National headquarters uses numbered staff designations. The published roster identifies the following directorates and staff offices:

Designation	Staff area
J-1	Manpower and personnel
J-2	Intelligence
J-3	Operations and training
J-4	Logistics
J-5	Strategic plans and policy
J-6	Electronics and signals
J-8	Funding, field support, and equipment; comptroller
J-9	Inspector general

The roster also includes a judge advocate and chief of chaplains, together with medical, educational, and other specialist commands.

== Training ==
Initial Entry Training follows TRADOC 600-4 and recruits must successfully earn their basic MEMS (Military Emergency Management Specialist) badge from the State Guard Association of the United States, before being able to graduate. Similar to the National Guard and Army reserves, units drill once a month. Drills consist of continued FEMA education, Physical Training, SGAUS emergency response training, first-aid, search and rescue training.

USV-JSC's Rough Rider Leadership University provides organizational education through a College of Leadership and Command, an NCO Academy, a Chaplain Corps College, and a Military Emergency Response Team Academy. Published course areas include funeral-honors procedures, leadership, staff work, and emergency response.

== See also ==
- Army of the United States: Similar designation used for the greatly expanded United States Army made up of volunteers and draftees created during the World Wars in the 20th century. Technically, the organization remains on the books today although it has been made effectively inactive after the end of the draft in 1973.
- United States Army Reserve
- Pennsylvania military volunteer units
