= Crawford County Courthouse =

Crawford County Courthouse may refer to:

- Crawford County Courthouse (Arkansas), Van Buren, Arkansas
- Crawford County Courthouse (Georgia), Knoxville, Georgia
- Crawford County Courthouse (Iowa), Denison, Iowa
- Crawford County Courthouse (Kansas), Girard, Kansas
- Crawford County Courthouse (Ohio), Bucyrus, Ohio
- Crawford County Courthouse (Wisconsin), Prairie du Chien, Wisconsin
