= Crawford School =

Crawford School may refer to:

- Crawford School of Public Policy
- Crawford School, of Excelsior Township School District 1, in Excelsior Township, Michigan
- Crawford-Rodriguez Elementary School - Jackson, New Jersey - Jackson School District
- Crawford Elementary School - Houston, Texas - List of Houston Independent School District elementary schools

== See also ==
- Crawford County Schools
