= Treaty of the Creek Agency (1818) =

1818 treaty between the United States and Creek

The Treaty of the Creek Agency was signed on January 22, 1818, at the Creek Agency on the Flint River in Georgia. The treaty was handled for the U.S. by former Governor of Georgia David Brydie Mitchell who was serving as President James Monroe's agent of Indian affairs for the Creek nation. The terms of the treaty ceded two tracts of land to the United States in exchange for $120,000 paid to the Creeks over the course of 11 years.

== See also ==
- Treaty of Moultrie Creek
- List of treaties
