= Trautmann =

Trautmann is a German surname. Notable people with the surname include:

- Andreas Trautmann (born 1959), German footballer
- Bert Trautmann (1923–2013), German goalkeeper
- Catherine Trautmann (born 1951), French politician, mayor of Strasbourg
- Gene Trautmann (born 1966), drummer
- Reinhold Trautmann (1883–1951), German Slavist
- Richard Trautmann (born 1969), German judoka
- Thomas Trautmann (born 1940), American historian
- William Trautmann (1869–1940), founding General-Secretary of the U.S. Industrial Workers of the World (IWW)

Trautman is a surname. Notable people with the surname include:

- Adam Trautman (born 1997), American football player
- Allan Trautman (born 1955), American puppeteer and actor
- Andrzej Trautman (1933–2026), Polish mathematical physicist
- Donald Walter Trautman (1936–2022), American Roman Catholic clergy, bishop of the Diocese of Erie
- George Trautman (1890–1963), American baseball executive and a college men's basketball coach
- George J. Trautman, III (born 1952), Deputy Commandant for Aviation of the United States Marine Corps
- Colonel Samuel Trautman, a fictional character in the first three Rambo films

== Other ==
- Trautmann mediation
- Trautmann (film)
- Trautmann (TV series)

== See also ==
- Troutman (disambiguation)
