= Crawford County Courthouse (Georgia) =

- U.S. National Register of Historic Places
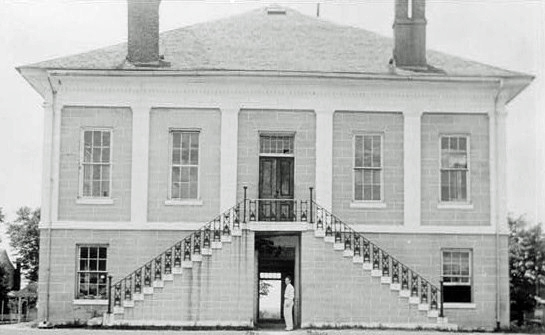
- Crawford County Courthouse (June 21, 1938)

- Location within Georgia Location within the United States
- Location: U.S. 80, Knoxville, Georgia
- Coordinates: 32°43′28″N 83°59′53″W
- Area: less than one acre
- Built: 1832
- Architect: Henry Crews
- Architectural style: Vernacular (Greek Revival influence)
- MPS: Georgia County Courthouses TR
- NRHP reference No.: 80001008
- Added to NRHP: September 18, 1980

The Crawford County courthouse in Knoxville, Georgia served as such from 1832 to 2001. Until the time it was removed from service, it was the oldest courthouse still in use in Georgia. It was listed on the National Register of Historic Places in 1980.

== History ==
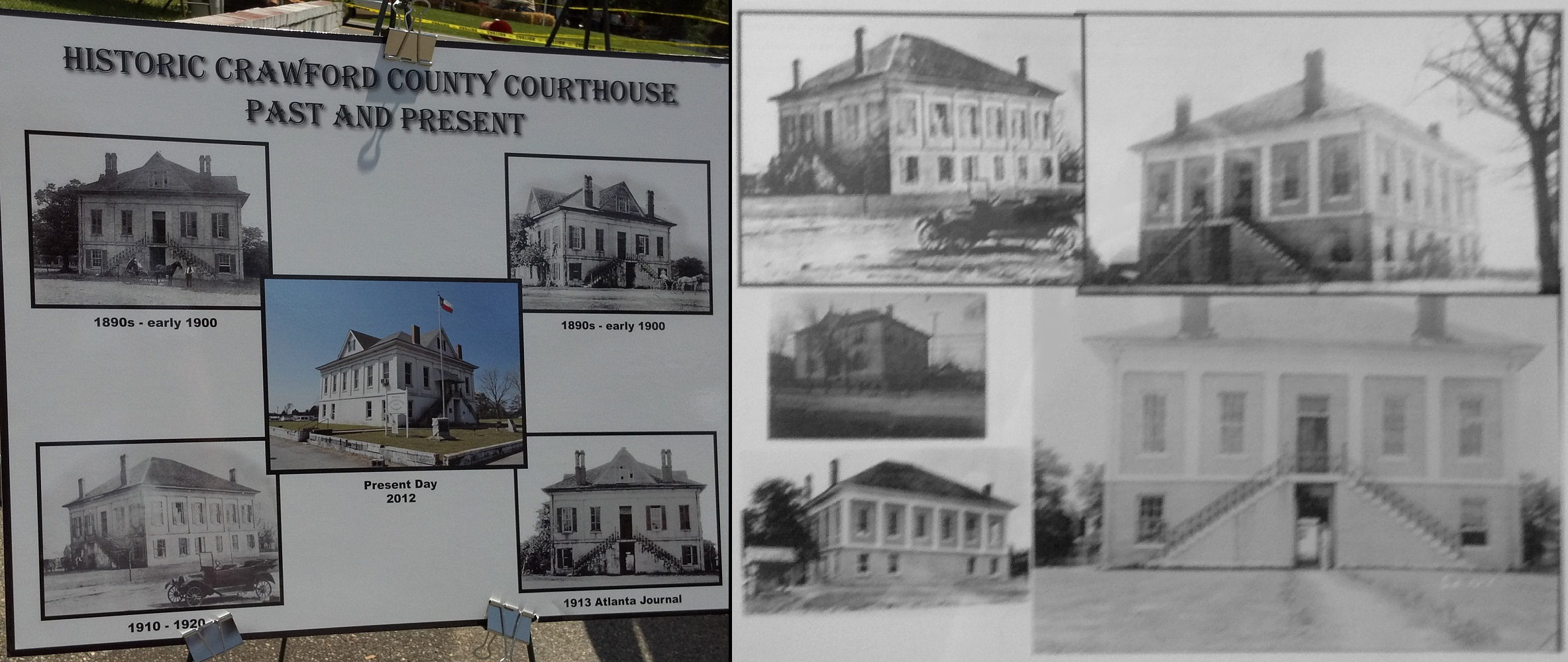
Old and new pictures of the courthouse taken from various sources, seen at the Old Knoxville Days on May 19, 2012.

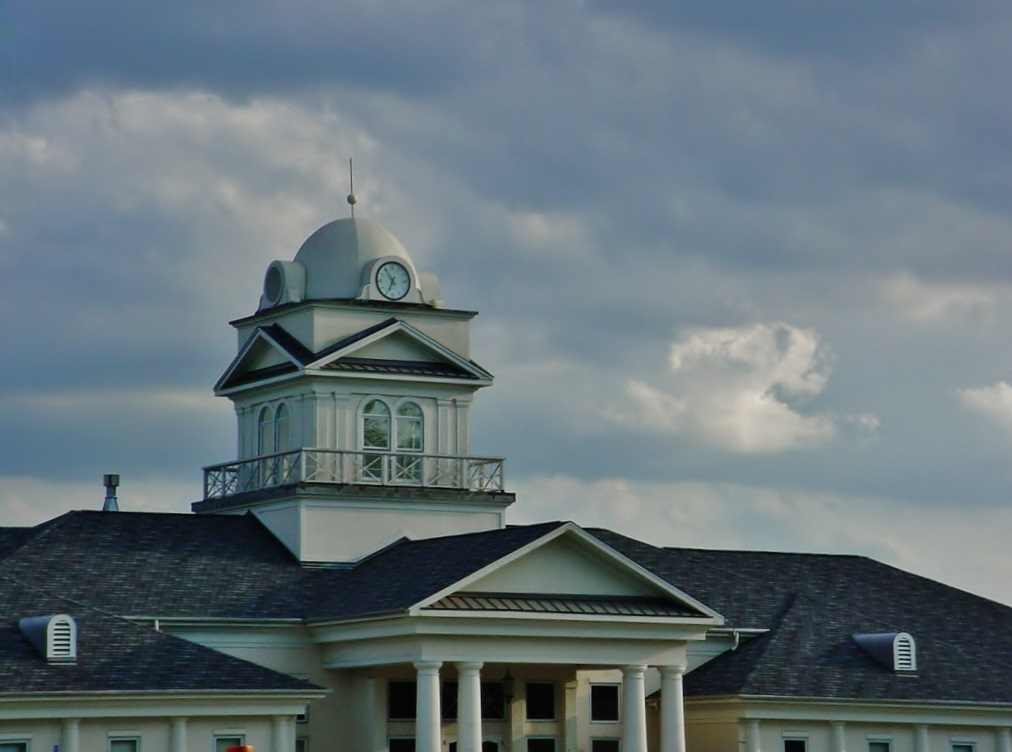
The new courthouse.

In an act of December 23, 1822, the legislature authorized Crawford County's initial inferior court to select a site to serve as county seat and provide for construction of a courthouse with a provision that such site "be as near the center of the county as convenience will admit." (Ga. Laws 1822, p. 23) The same act provided that until a courthouse could be built, Crawford County courts and elections would be held at the home of Imlay Vansciver. In December 1823, the legislature designated Knoxville as the county seat. At some point thereafter, Crawford County's first courthouse was built. That structure burned down in 1829 or 1830. The following year, construction of a new courthouse began. The new building was completed in January 1832. Since then, there have been numerous repairs and remodeling, with extensive interior renovations and construction of a small addition in the late 1960s. Around 1890, a new railroad was built through the middle of Crawford County following a north-south route. For whatever reason, the railroad's path came near to, but skipped, the county seat of Knoxville. The historic structure is now the home of the Crawford County Historical Society.

=== A new courthouse ===
In 2001-02, a new courthouse was built one block behind the old courthouse, as the previous structure was built long before elevators were invented for the disabled. The new courthouse has a clock tower on top of it, which sunk into the roof shortly after completion, causing major damage. It has since been repaired, although some residents of Knoxville remain wary of it.

== Today ==
Today the courthouse serves as a museum, and is also home to the Crawford County Historical Society. The flag that flies outside of the courthouse is derived from the Lone star flag, the state flag of Texas.

== See also ==
- Crawford County Jail
