= Crawford County High School (Roberta, Georgia) =

Public high school in Roberta, Georgia, United States

Location
- 400 East Agency Street; Roberta, Georgia 31078; United States
- Coordinates: 32.720556°N 84.005°W

Information
- School type: Public high school
- School board: Crawford County Board of Education
- School district: Crawford County School District
- Superintendent: Brent Lowe
- Principal: Ed Mashburn
- Teaching staff: 38.00 (FTE)
- Grades: 9 – 12
- Gender: Co-ed
- Enrollment: 512 (2023–2024)
- Student to teacher ratio: 13.47
- Colors: Purple and gold
- Sports: Football, basketball, baseball, softball, wrestling, cross-country, track and field, cheerleading
- Mascot: Mighty Eagle
- Team name: Eagles
- Accreditation: Southern Association of Colleges and Schools
- Website: CCHS website

Crawford County High School is a public high school in Roberta, Georgia, United States. It is located at 400 East Agency Street. The school's sports teams are known as the Eagles.

== Athletics ==
Crawford County High School's sports teams compete in the GHSA at the A classification. Affiliated boys' sports include football, baseball, and basketball at the varsity and junior varsity level. Girls' sports include basketball, softball, and cheerleading at the varsity and junior varsity level. Crawford County also participates in varsity wrestling.

=== Rivalries ===
==== Taylor County ====
Crawford County shares a decades-long rivalry in all sports with its neighbor to the west, Taylor County High School. The two teams meet nearly every football season in either regular season or scrimmage games in a showdown known locally as the "Battle for the Flint" (in reference to the Flint River, which forms the border between the two counties). The game typically provides one of the highest attendance rates for both schools, and pranks are common between students of the schools in the week leading up to the game.

==== Peach County ====
Crawford County also shares a rivalry with its southern neighbor, Peach County High School, in all major sports except football (in which the two schools have rarely faced one another) and wrestling (as Peach County does not field a wrestling team). The rivalry is notable for the intensity of basketball games (girls' and boys') between the two schools, and the large attendance numbers for fans of both schools during the games.

==== Rutland ====
Shortly after its opening in 2003 Rutland High School became a rival of Crawford County, due to the proximity of the two schools and Rutland's inclusion in Region 5-AA (Crawford's region in the GHSA at the time). The rivalry continued in football for four years until Rutland was reclassified as AAA and was moved out of the region. The two schools still compete at times in baseball, basketball, softball, and wrestling.

== Notable alumni ==
- Kenny Walker
