= Zenith, Georgia =

Zenith
- Unincorporated community
- Location within the state of Georgia Zenith (the United States)
- Coordinates: 32°36′43″N 83°58′40″W
- Country: United States
- State: Georgia
- County: Crawford
- Elevation: 584 ft (178 m)
- Time zone: UTC-5 (Eastern (EST))
  - Summer (DST): UTC-4 (EDT)
- Area code: 478
- GNIS ID: 326604

Zenith is an unincorporated community in Crawford County, Georgia, United States.

== History ==
A post office called Zenith was established in 1893, and remained in operation until 1934. The community was so named on account of its lofty elevation.
