= Musella, Georgia =

Musella
- Unincorporated community Census-designated place
- Location within the state of Georgia Musella (the United States)
- Coordinates: 32°47′52″N 84°01′56″W
- Country: United States
- State: Georgia
- County: Crawford
- Elevation: 591 ft (180 m)

Population (2020)
  - Total: 104
- Time zone: UTC-5 (Eastern (EST))
  - Summer (DST): UTC-4 (EDT)
- ZIP code: 31066
- Area code: 478
- GNIS ID: 319174

Musella is an unincorporated community and census-designated place (CDP) in Crawford County, Georgia, United States.

As of the 2020 census, Musella had a population of 104.

== History ==
A post office called Musella was established in 1889. According to tradition, the community's name is an amalgamation Mose and Ella, the names of two first settlers. C.F. Hays & Son general store, a small and traditional country store, was built in the year 1900.

== Demographics ==
Historical population
Census	Pop.	Note	%±
2020	104		—
U.S. Decennial Census; 2020

Musella was first listed as a census designated place in the 2020 U.S. census.

=== 2020 census ===
Musella CDP, Georgia – Racial and ethnic composition Note: the US Census treats Hispanic/Latino as an ethnic category. This table excludes Latinos from the racial categories and assigns them to a separate category. Hispanics/Latinos may be of any race.
Race / Ethnicity (NH = Non-Hispanic)	Pop 2020	% 2020
White alone (NH)	34	32.69%
Black or African American alone (NH)	70	67.31%
Native American or Alaska Native alone (NH)	0	0.00%
Asian alone (NH)	0	0.00%
Pacific Islander alone (NH)	0	0.00%
Some Other Race alone (NH)	0	0.00%
Mixed Race or Multi-Racial (NH)	0	0.00%
Hispanic or Latino (any race)	0	0.00%
Total	104	100.00%
