= Creek Agency =

Coordinates: 32°40′00″N 84°5′46″W

The Creek Agency was an organ of the U.S. Government authorized to interact and negotiate with the Muscogee people of Georgia and the Mississippi Territory (commonly called Creeks by white settlers). It was set up in 1796 on the Flint River in what is today Crawford County, Georgia by Indian Agent Col. Benjamin Hawkins. He established there a trading post and a plantation. Hawkins, regarded both at the time and now as relatively successful in his interactions with the Creeks, died in 1816. He was succeeded by David B. Mitchell (1817–1821), formerly Governor of Georgia. His tenure was much less successful. The Treaty of the Creek Agency (1818) was signed there. It is not known whether his successor, John Crowell, resided at the Creek Agency.
