= Troutman flag =

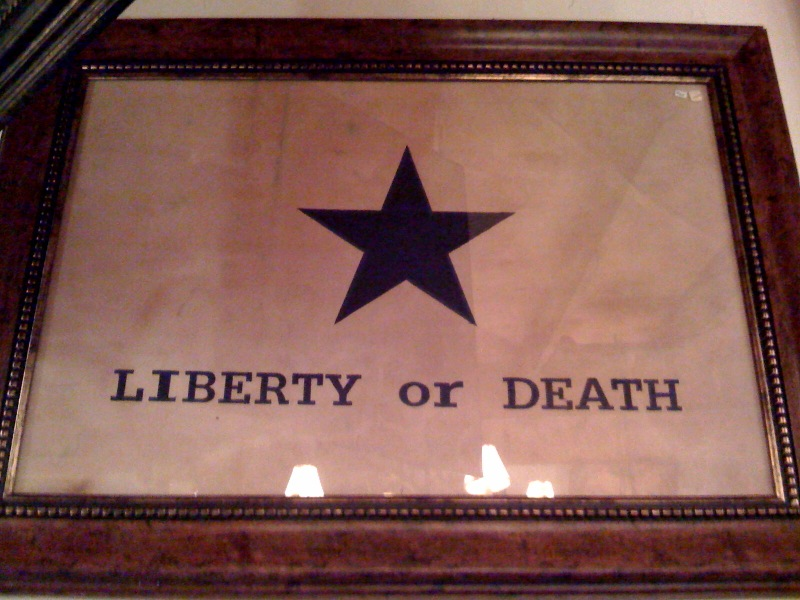
Troutman Flag

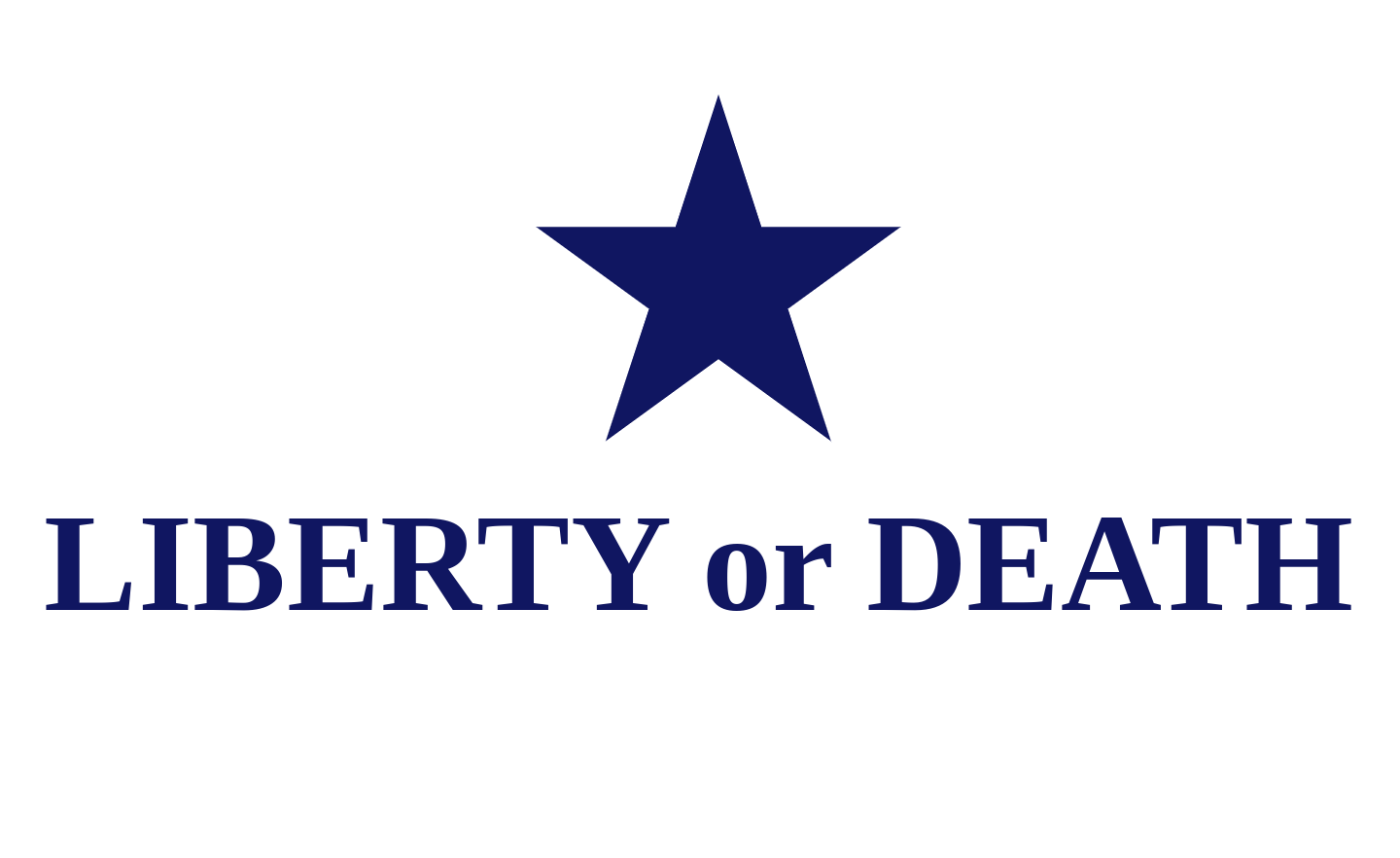
The flag recreated digitally

The Troutman Flag was designed by Joanna Troutman. Joanna designed the flag when she was 18 years old and living in Georgia. The flag was white silk, with a five pointed blue star on it, with the words "Liberty or Death" beneath the star. Some sources say the words read "Texas and Liberty", although the majority seem to favor "Liberty or Death".

Joanna sent the flag with a Georgian battalion which was headed to help the Texans in their fight for independence from Mexico. The flag was unfurled over the American Hotel on January 8, 1836, in Velasco. The original flag was lost/destroyed at battle.

== Sources ==
- Troutman, Joanna (1818–1879) from the Handbook of Texas Online
- Remembering Milledgeville by Hugh T. Harrington (pp. 93–94)
