= Kathryn Troutman =

American author, consultant and career trainer

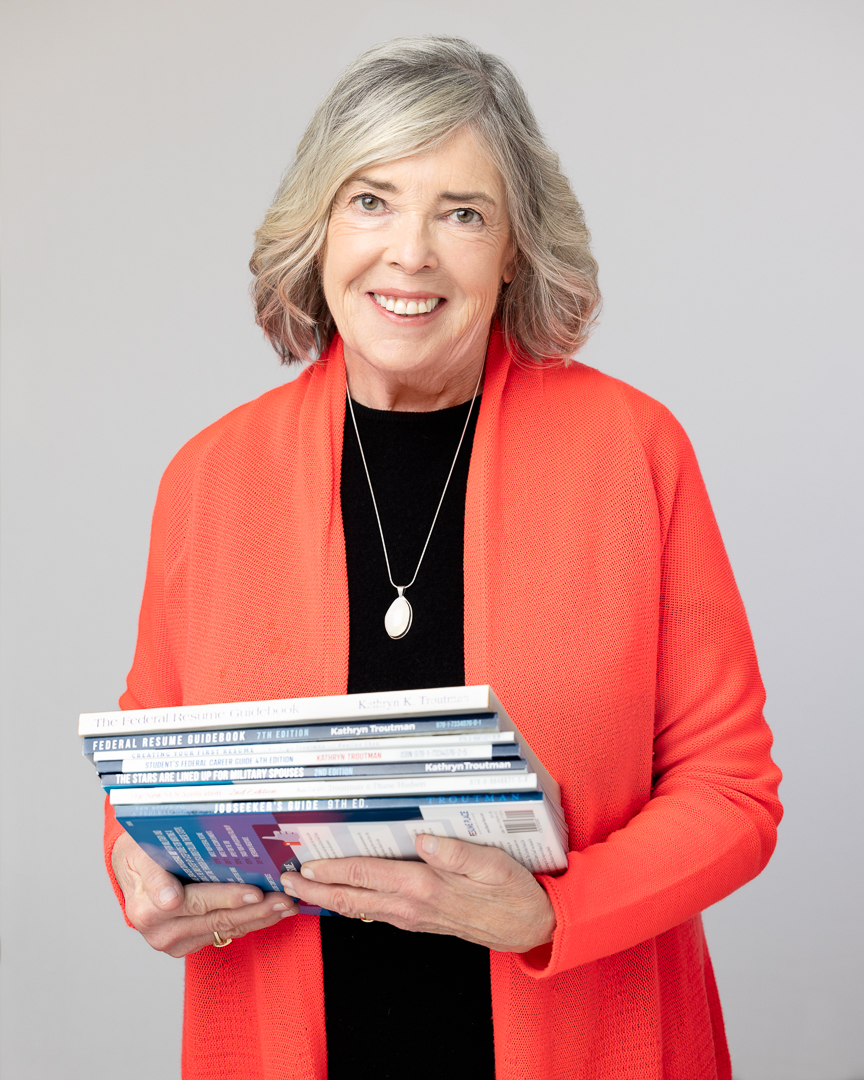
- Troutman in 2023
- Born: October 5, 1947 (age 79); Baltimore, Maryland, US
- Education: U. of Maryland, College Park
- Occupations: Author, trainer, career counselor, Federal Resume advisor
- Known for: Ten Steps to a Federal Job, Federal Resume Guidebook, Certified Federal Job Search Trainer program
- Website: http://www.resume-place.com

Kathryn Kraemer Troutman (born October 5, 1947) is an American author, consultant, and career trainer. She has assisted individuals seeking government employment. She is the founder and president of The Resume Place, Inc., a service business located in Baltimore, MD that consults on, writes, and designs federal and private-sector resumes.

Troutman has been presented in the media as an expert on the Federal Resume, Senior Executive Service Applications, and federal career consulting. She has worked in this field since 1971 and has published 35 books on these subjects.

== Early life and family ==
Kathryn Troutman was one of five children born to Edward and Bonita Kraemer, and she grew up with siblings Bonny, Edward, Jr. (Ted), Richard and Robert. Her parents met while Bonita was working as a secretary at Picker X-Ray Co. in Baltimore; Edward was an X-ray salesman. The two were married on New Year's Eve, 1945.

Kathryn's authorship, speaking and teaching reflect her family's background as educators, writers and storytellers. Both of her maternal grandparents – Alvis and Bessie Dick – were frontier school teachers. Her famous uncle – Everett Dick – wrote The Sod House Frontier 1854-1890, which was first published in 1937. According to NebraskaAuthors.org, the book is considered “a classic account of the European settlement of the Great Plains.” Her mother Bonita wrote a children's book titled Rules Mean Happiness while working as an editor for the General Conference of Seventh-day Adventists.

Kathryn went to college at the University of Maryland, College Park. While at UMCP, she performed with the university's Magricals Singers, including an appearance at the White House for President Nixon and his family in December 1969. She left the university in 1971 to start a resume business that led to establishing the Resume Place.

== Career ==
In 1995, as the US government began phasing out Standard Form 171, Troutman wrote the Federal Resume Guidebook, the first-ever book on how to write a federal resume. The Federal Resume Guidebook is now in its 8th Edition. This latest edition was recognized as a Distinguished Favorite in the Career category of the 2026 Independent Press Awards and took Silver for Reference in the 2026 IBPA Book Awards. The 8th Edition was published at a crucial time (September 2025) when the US Office of Personnel Management (OPM) had changed the long-used lengthy format of the federal resume to just two-pages.

Other Troutman federal career publications include Transitioning Your Federal Resume to Private Industry (this new title took Best Reference Book in the 2026 Independent Press Awards); The Stars Are Lined Up for Military Spouses, 3rd Edition (the 3rd Edition was the winner of Best/Gold in Career in the Next Generation Indie Book Awards, The Student’s Federal Career Guide, 4th Edition (the 3rd Edition won the 2013 Foreword Indie Gold Award in Career); the Military to Federal Career Guide, 2nd Edition; and the Jobseeker’s Guide, 10th Edition.

Troutman has appeared online, in print, radio, and television to answer questions about federal careers, resume writing, and job search techniques. She has appeared repeatedly on The Washington Post's Federal Diary Live On-Line and the Federal News Network. On August 26, 2020, Troutman was the guest for a "Life After COVID" segment on Mike Causey's "Your Turn" program on Federal News Network to discuss strategies for applying for federal job openings that continued to appear on the USAJobs.gov website despite, and in some cases, because of the coronavirus crisis. On April 4, 2025, Troutman was quoted by The Baltimore Sun newspaper in an article titled "Federal Layoffs, Crowded Labor Market 'Deflating' for Maryland Job Seekers." The Baltimore Banner interviewed Troutman in October 2025 for an article titled "AI is invading the job search. Here’s how federal workers can outsmart it." Troutman advised jobseekers to use their preferred AI system to generate 10 core capabilities from a job announcement to focus on in their federal resume. She warned against having AI rewrite the long-form federal resume into a short version, saying "that’s likely to be caught by an AI detection system and lead to rejection." On December 26, 2025, Troutman appeared on the Resilience Round Up Podcast in an episode titled "The Stars Are Lined Up for Military Spouses." She discussed how military spouses can launch a federal career through the Priority Placement Program, which gives preference to these candidates when they apply for Department of Defense civilian positions. The show is produced by the US Army Directorate of Prevention, Resilience and Readiness.

Troutman has regularly led workshops on Federal Resumes and the federal job search for a variety of audiences, including people at military bases such as Misawa Air Base, Japan, U.S. Army Fort Huachuca, Arizona, and Schofield Army Barracks, Oahu, Hawaii. With the new two-page federal resume format and the numerous layoffs in the federal government since January 2025, she has run free workshops this past year on how to convert the old lengthy federal resume to two pages, how to write the new SES two-page resume, and how to write private industry resumes. In an April 11, 2025 Baltimore Sun interview, she said that companies are hiring in human resources, IT, training, business development and contracts. But she noted that competition will be "double, triple what it was." And she added that "You have no choice but to keep at it... The whole thing is the resume." In addition to offering workshops through the Resume Place, she has also been hired by local entities to present them, including by the Montgomery County Public Library. She is currently a publishing member of the Independent Book Publishers Association (IBPA).

== Recognition ==
In 2022, Troutman received the National Resume Writers Association's Industry Hero Award for her "significant contributions" to the specialized field of federal resume writing. Among the accomplishments NRWA noted for Troutman are designing the modern federal resume format and creating the train-the-trainer program called "Ten Steps to a Federal Job" for federal resume writing.

In October 2024, Kathryn Troutman's firm, Resume Place, Inc., won a Moxie Award in the Women-Owned Business category. Resume Place was one of only 17 DC area businesses and organizations to be so honored that year in the award's various categories. Moxie Chair Katie Jordan said, "...this year's winners shined brightest among their competition for demonstrating exemplary innovation, growth and resilience, industry leadership, community service, and local achievements." The awards were announced at a live ceremony at The Ritz-Carlton in Tysons Corner on October 24.

In February 2026, it was announced that Troutman's Transitioning Your Federal Resume to Private Industry: A Step-by-Step Guide won this year's Independent Press Award for Reference. Calling it an “indispensable resource,” IPA said the book "breaks down the daunting task of converting a...federal resume into a streamlined, impactful two-page private industry document" and lauded its “practical, eight-step methodology.”

At the same time, IPA announced that Troutman's Federal Resume Guidebook, 8th Edition, was recognized as a Distinguished Favorite in this year's Independent Press Awards’ Career category. Calling the book an “essential compass for the new federal job market,” IPA commended the author's approach to “guide candidates through the turbulent transition from verbose, traditional federal resume to the sharp, targeted format” OPM now requires, which is just two pages.

This year's IPA awards were presented to Troutman and the other recipients on stage at an Awards Dinner and Ceremony in the New York metro area on April 25.

On May 20, 2026, it was announced that Troutman's book, The Stars Are Lined Up for Military Spouses for Federal Careers, 3rd Edition, secured the top prize, Gold, for Career in the Next Generation Indie Book Awards. A judge commented, "The third edition clearly demystifies federal hiring for military spouses, pairing current policy insight with resume samples to show how relocations and volunteer leadership become competitive and empowering federal applications." In addition, both the Federal Resume Guidebook, 8th Edition, and Transitioning Your Federal Resume to Private Industry, 1st Edition, were Finalists in Career in this competition. The Stars book also achieved Finalist recognition in the Military classification.

Capping a winning awards season, Troutman's latest edition of her best-selling Federal Resume Guidebook was honored with a Silver Prize for Reference in the IBPA Book Awards on May 18 at a gala ceremony at the Hyatt Regency Portland.

== Personal life ==
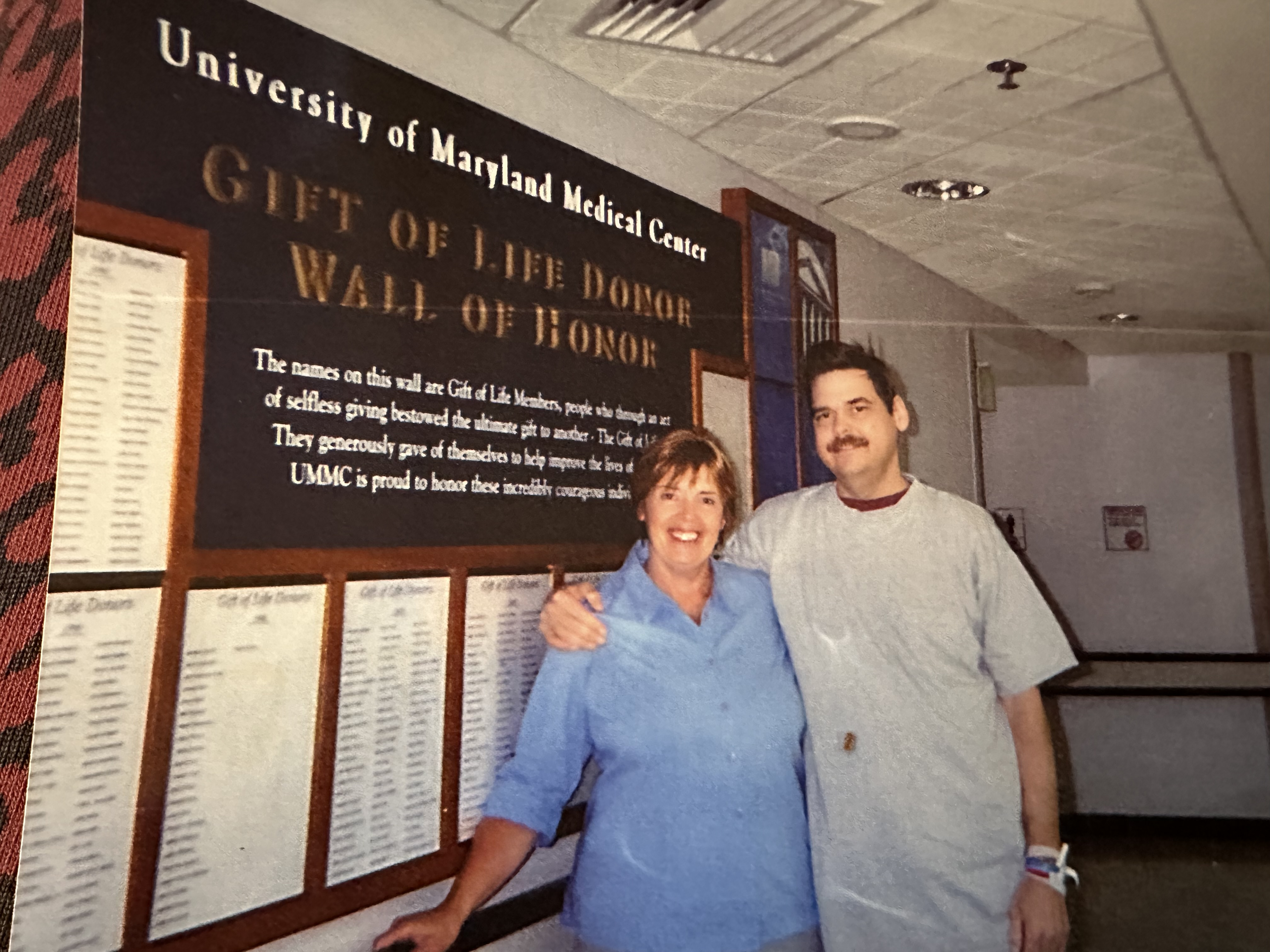
Kathryn Troutman and her brother Rob by the Donor Wall at the University of Maryland Medical Center after he received her donated kidney. Photo by Bonny Kraemer Lally.

Kathryn donated a kidney to her brother Robert in 2004, when his kidney failed due to brittle Diabetes. After the transplant, he lived a full life for another 14 years until his passing on December 5, 2018. He was known for his creative sheet metal designs, one of which was featured at the Trolley Stop in Elliott City.

Kathryn's brother, Richard Edward Kraemer, is a divorce and separation attorney in Fort Collins, Colorado. He was mayor of the town of Mead from 2002 to 2006.

Her sister, Bonny Kraemer Lally, is a professional musician and soprano soloist. She is the musical director of Grace Episcopal Church in Elkridge, Maryland.

The author has three children, Emily, Chris and Lori. Emily Troutman is an independent journalist and photographer who covers global humanitarian issues. In 2009, she was named Citizen Ambassador to the United Nations based on her winning video, “My Message to World Leaders: One Person at a Time.” Allen “Chris” Troutman is an Emergency Management Specialist at the Federal Emergency Management Agency (FEMA). Lori Morgan successfully campaigned to save more than 90 trees from being cut down at the Palm Crest Elementary School of LaCañada Flintridge in 2022. The School Board wanted to cut down many of the trees to create a bigger parking lot.

Kathryn's mother Bonita passed on in April 2023 at the age of 102. Bonita was preceded in death by her husband, Edward, and two of her sons, Edward, Jr. (Ted) and Robert.

== Bibliography ==
- Transitioning Your Federal Resume to Private Industry, 2025
- The Stars Are Lined Up for Military Spouses, 3rd Edition, 2025
- Creating Your First Resume, 1st Edition, 2015
- Federal Resume Guidebook, 1st Edition, 1995; 8th Edition, 2025
- Jobseeker's Guide, Ten Steps to a Federal Job, 10th Edition, 2026
- Military to Federal Career Guide, 2nd Edition, 2012
- Ten Steps to a Federal Job & CD-ROM, 3rd Edition, 2011
- Writing Your NSPS Self-Assessment, 2nd Edition, 2009
- Student's Federal Career Guide, 4th Edition, 2018 (Updated for 2020)

Co-Authored Works:

- The ALJ Writing Guide (with Nicole Schultheis), 2nd Edition, 2016
- The New SES Application (with Diane Hudson), 2nd Edition, 2016
