= Knoxville, Georgia =

- Unincorporated community Census-designated place
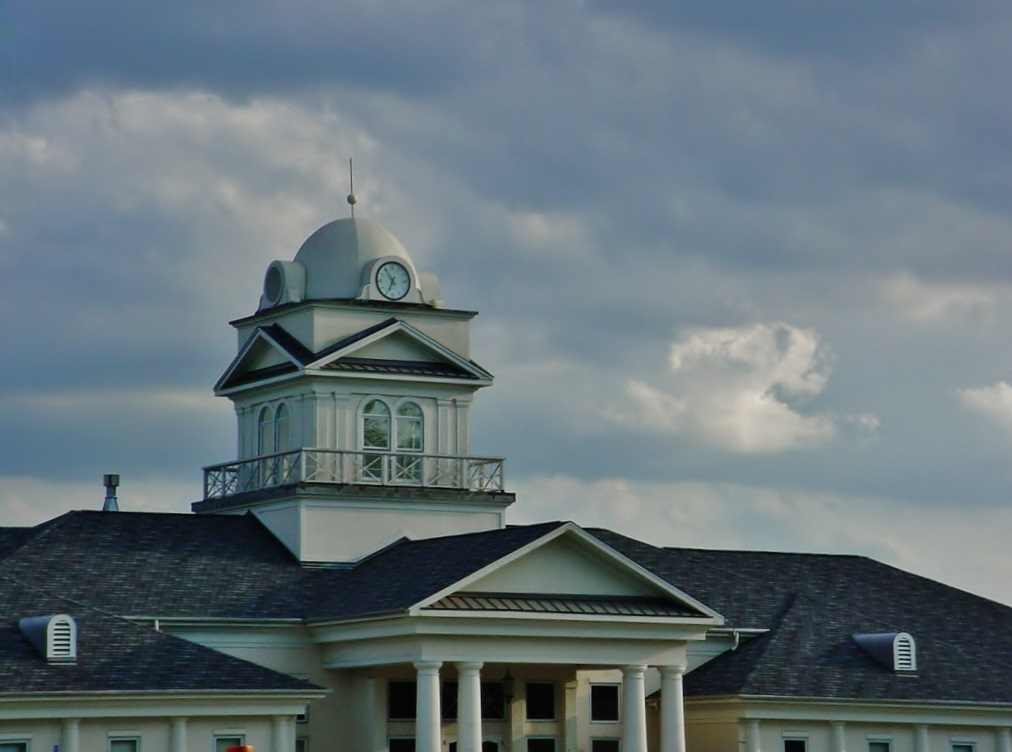
- Closeup of the Crawford County courthouse

- Location within Georgia Location within the United States
- Coordinates: 32°43′27″N 83°59′51″W
- Country: United States
- State: Georgia
- County: Crawford

Area
  - Total: 0.32 sq mi (0.83 km^{2})
  - Land: 0.32 sq mi (0.83 km^{2})
  - Water: 0 sq mi (0.00 km^{2})
- Elevation: 495 ft (151 m)

Population (2020)
  - Total: 65
  - Density: 203.4/sq mi (78.52/km^{2})
- Time zone: UTC-5 (Eastern (EST))
  - Summer (DST): UTC-4 (EDT)
- ZIP code: 31050
- Area code: 478
- FIPS code: 13-44060
- GNIS feature ID: 0332159

Knoxville is an unincorporated community and census-designated place in Crawford County, Georgia, United States. It is the county seat of Crawford County. The community is part of the Macon metropolitan area. As of the 2020 census, Knoxville had a population of 65.

Knoxville was founded in 1823 as seat of the newly formed Crawford County. It was incorporated as a town in 1825. The former city's municipal charter was dissolved in 1995 pursuant to a Georgia law which abolished city governments which were defunct or minimally operative.

There are three National Register of Historic Places in Knoxville, which are the Crawford County Courthouse, the Crawford County Jail, and the Georgia Post Building.

== History ==
=== Naming ===
There is confusion as to whom Knoxville was named for. Historians who rely on old records and spoken traditions have pointed to General Henry Knox, who served in the Continental Army under George Washington, though General Knox had no ties to the state of Georgia, and had been deceased for 15 years at the time of naming (c. 1821). Some historians argue that the town was named for Hugh Knox, a stagecoach operator who delivered mail along the Federal Wire Line through the future location of Knoxville. Knox owned a half-way house, where travelers could rest and swap horses, called the Knox House. Since there is no solid evidence of either of these men being the namesake of the town, the subject is left open to individual interpretation.

=== Beginnings ===
On December 23, 1822, the Georgia legislature directed Crawford County's Inferior Court to select a county seat and build a courthouse. Considering Knoxville was centrally located in the county, and also rested along the Federal Wire Road, it was decided on December 10, 1823, that Knoxville should become the county seat. The house of a local resident was used as a temporary courthouse until a permanent one was built, which occurred c.1825. But, in an apparent act of arson, the courthouse was leveled in 1830, destroying all court and county records. A second courthouse was completed in 1831, which still stands today as a museum and home to the Crawford County Historical Society. In 1832 a jail was built in Knoxville, but was torn down in 1839 due to a grand jury presentment declaring that this jail was not fit for use. Therefore, in 1843 another jail was built, though, in 1887, this jail, now 44 years old, was itself declared unfit for use and torn down. A third jail was completed by 1888, which stands to this day.

=== Rise and fall ===
On January 2, 1827, Knoxville Academy opened, the town's first school. In 1888 The Knoxville Journal was founded. Publisher Percy V. Howell printed advertisements for the sale of real estate in the as-yet-unnamed town of Roberta, which was speculated to become a boomtown. Yet, by 1892, The Crawford County Herald was the official newspaper of Crawford County, and was published in Roberta rather than Knoxville. Knoxville's population by 1886 numbered around 200, but was expected to increase to 3,000. The A&F Railroad, also known as the Atlanta and Hawkinsville Railroad, missed Knoxville to the southwest by about one mile. This is believed to be the result of local opposition of out-of-state intruders penetrating Knoxville. A new railroad station began to be built around this time, in the area which would later become Roberta. Inhabitants of Knoxville began the one-mile shift to Roberta once the new railroad was completed, dooming Knoxville's growth. Thenceforth, Knoxville was merely a community that held the title of county seat.

=== 1995 Municipal Charter Law ===
In 1993 the Georgia Legislature passed a law detailing the minimum requirements for a city to remain incorporated in Georgia, resulting, in 1995, in Knoxville's unincorporation.

== Geography ==
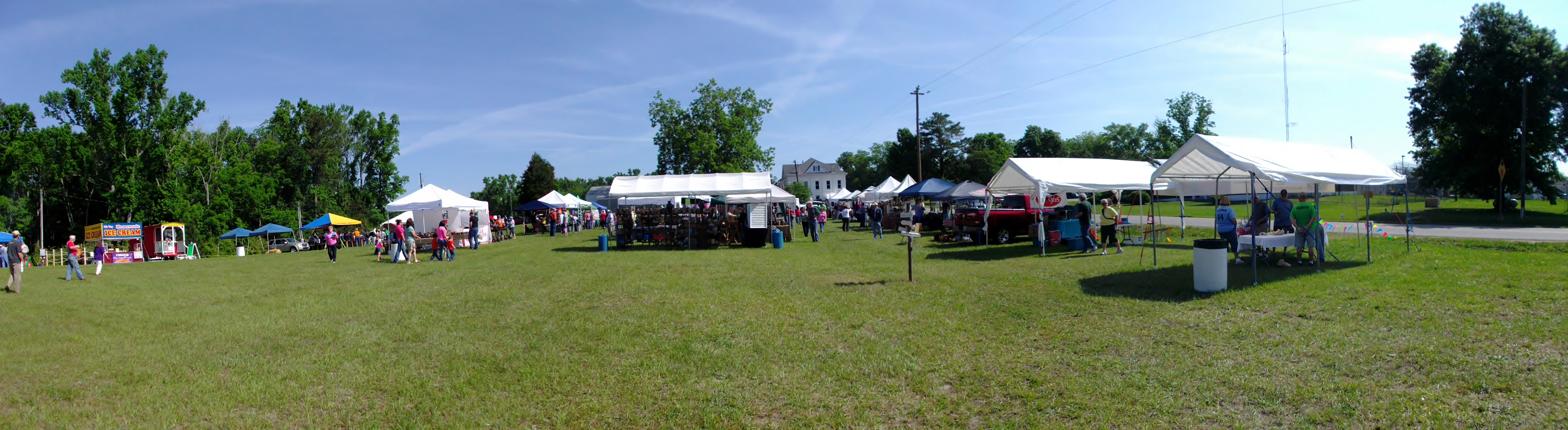
Panorama of the Old Knoxville Days festival

Knoxville is located in central Crawford County and is bordered to the west by the city of Roberta, the only incorporated place in the county. U.S. Route 80 passes through Knoxville, leading east 25 mi (40 km) to Macon and west 70 mi (113 km) to Columbus. Georgia State Route 42 also runs through the community, leading southeast 18 mi (29 km) to Byron and west to Roberta with U.S. 80.

According to the U.S. Census Bureau, the Knoxville CDP has an area of 0.32 square miles (0.83 km^{2}), all land.

== Demographics ==
Historical population
Census	Pop.	Note	%±
1890	580		—
1900	500		−13.8%
1910	211		−57.8%
2010	69		—
2020	65		−5.8%
U.S. Decennial Census; 1850-1870 1870-1880; 1890-1910 1920-1930; 1940 1950 1960; 1970 1980 1990; 2000 2010 2020

Knoxville appeared in the 1890 U.S. Census as a village. It appeared in the 1900 U.S. Census and the 1910 U.S. census but was delisted in the 1920 U.S. census. It was listed as a census designated place in the 2010 U.S. census.

Knoxville CDP, Georgia – Racial and ethnic composition Note: the US Census treats Hispanic/Latino as an ethnic category. This table excludes Latinos from the racial categories and assigns them to a separate category. Hispanics/Latinos may be of any race.
Race / Ethnicity (NH = Non-Hispanic)	Pop 2010	Pop 2020	% 2010	% 2020
White alone (NH)	46	47	66.67%	72.31%
Black or African American alone (NH)	16	9	23.19%	13.85%
Native American or Alaska Native alone (NH)	0	0	0.00%	0.00%
Asian alone (NH)	0	1	0.00%	1.54%
Pacific Islander alone (NH)	0	0	0.00%	0.00%
Some Other Race alone (NH)	0	0	0.00%	0.00%
Mixed Race or Multi-Racial (NH)	3	4	4.35%	6.15%
Hispanic or Latino (any race)	4	4	5.80%	6.15%
Total	69	65	100.00%	100.00%

== Notable people ==
Knoxville is the birthplace of John Pemberton, the inventor of Coca-Cola, although he moved to Columbus, Georgia, while a child. Knoxville was also home to Joanna Troutman, a young girl who sewed a single star on a white banner to give to a battalion of Georgia troops headed west to assist Texas citizens in their fight for independence.
