= Crawford County Jail =

- U.S. National Register of Historic Places
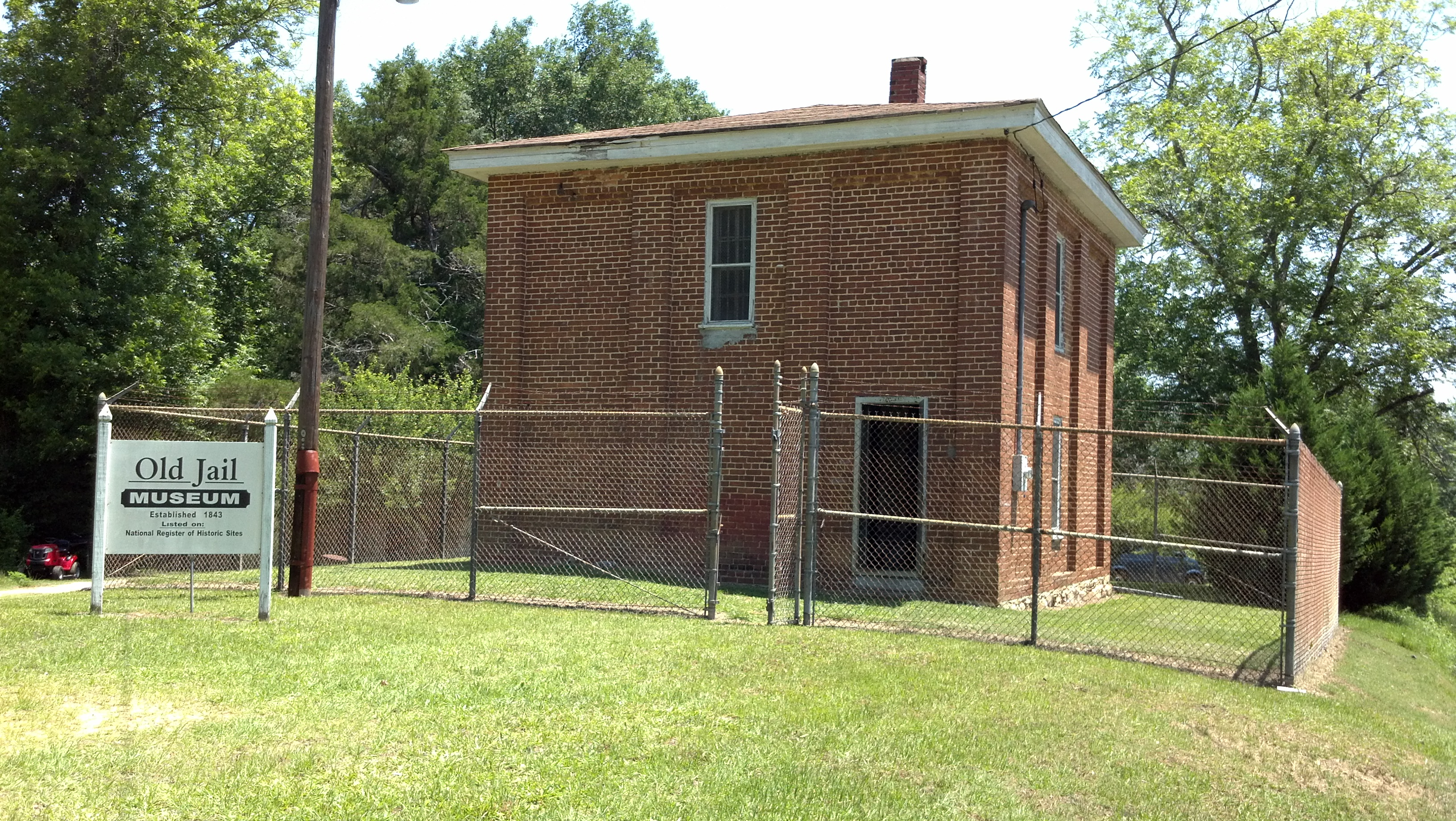

- Location within Georgia Location within the United States
- Location: U.S. 42, Knoxville, Georgia
- Coordinates: 32°43′27″N 83°59′45″W
- Area: less than one acre
- Built: 1882
- NRHP reference No.: 89000418
- Added to NRHP: May 18, 1989

The Crawford County Jail, also known as Old Crawford County Jail, located in Knoxville, Georgia, is one of the oldest jails in Georgia. It was added to the National Register of Historic Places on May 18, 1989. It is now a museum for the annual Georgia JugFest and Old Knoxville Days festival held in Knoxville every third Saturday in May. It contains a history of the jail, including how the jail looked when it was still in use. The current jail is nearby on the same road.

== Resources ==
- https://web.archive.org/web/20130220204525/http://nrhp.focus.nps.gov/natregsearchresult.do?fullresult=true&recordid=2
- http://www.qpublic.net/ga/crawford/
