= Joanna Troutman =

American flag maker (1818–1879)

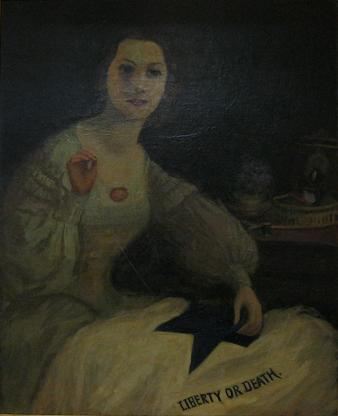
- Joanna Troutman portrait in Texas State Capitol
- Born: February 19, 1818; Baldwin County, Georgia, U.S.
- Died: 23 July 1879 (aged 61); Knoxville, Georgia, U.S.
- Occupation: Flag maker
- Spouses: Solomon L. Pope (m. 1839, 1872, his death) W. G. Vinson (m. 1875)

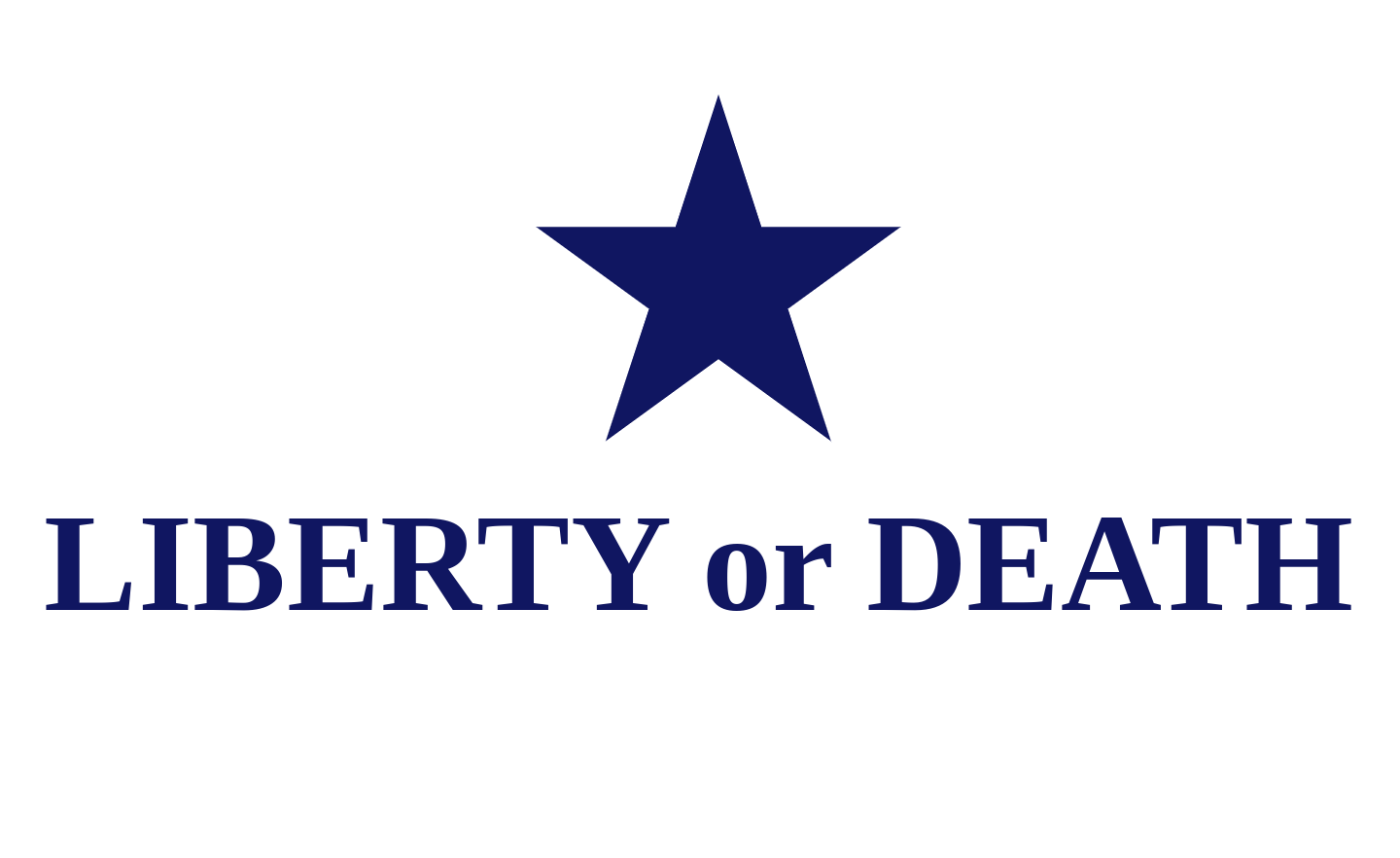
This flag designed by Joanna Troutman known as the "Troutman Flag" was used by the Georgia Battalion under the command of William Ward which marched from Macon, Georgia to participate in the fight against Mexico and were killed in the Battle of the Alamo in 1836

Joanna Troutman also Johanna Troutman (February 19, 1818 – July 23, 1879) sewed a flag for a battalion of Georgia volunteers who were leaving to fight in the Texas Revolution, which became known as the Troutman flag, consisting of a five-pointed blue star and the words "Liberty or Death" on a white silk field. On the reverse side was the Latin phrase UBI LIBERTAS HABITAT, IBI NOSTRA PATRIA EST, meaning: "Where liberty dwells, there is our fatherland." On January 8, 1836, the flag was raised at Velasco, which is now part of modern Freeport, Texas. The original flag was badly damaged by accident and only shreds flew in battle.

== Background ==
The Georgians, who were led by William Ward, suffered a harsh fate. Though they escaped the Battle of Coleto and the capitulation of James W. Fannin's command, they were pursued by José de Urrea's cavalry. Out of ammunition, they finally surrendered and were marched back to Goliad to join the rest of Fannin's captured troops. On March 27, 1836, they were nearly all executed in the Goliad massacre.

== Life ==
Born in Baldwin County, Georgia, United States, on February 19, 1818, Troutman was the daughter of Hiram Bainbridge Troutman. In 1839, she married Solomom L. Pope and moved to a plantation in Knoxville, Georgia, called Elmwood. The couple had four sons. Her husband died in 1872, and in 1875 she wed W. G. Vinson, who served in the Georgia state legislature. She died aged 61 on July 23, 1879, at Elmwood and was buried next to her first husband. At the request of Texas governor Oscar Branch Colquitt, her remains were transferred to the Texas State Cemetery in Austin in 1913. Her portrait hangs in one of the legislative chambers of the Texas Capitol.
