= Roberta, Georgia =

- City
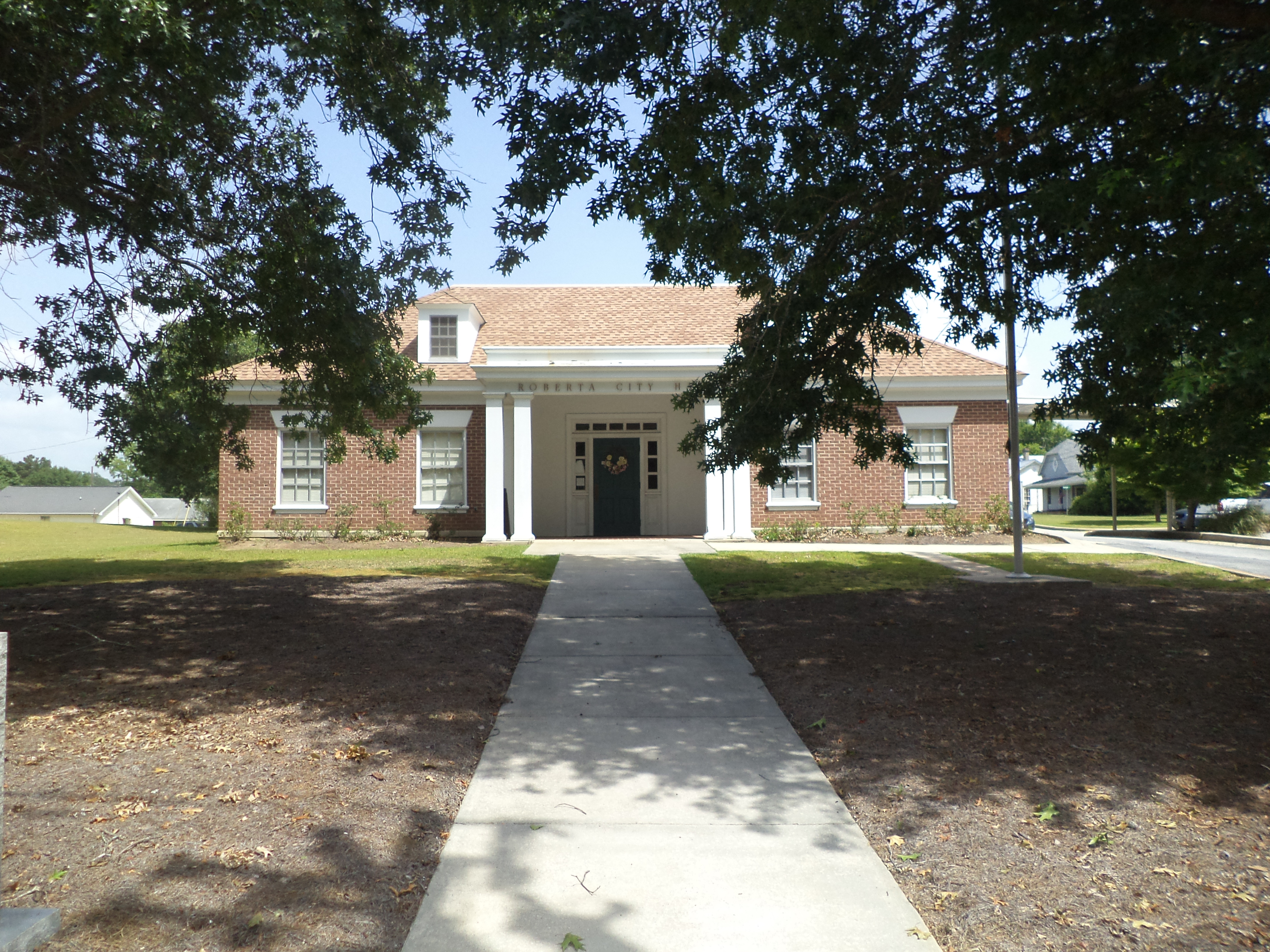
- Roberta City Hall
- Motto: A small town with a big heart
- Location in Crawford County and the state of Georgia
- Coordinates: 32°43′17″N 84°0′45″W
- Country: United States
- State: Georgia
- County: Crawford

Area
  - Total: 1.51 sq mi (3.90 km^{2})
  - Land: 1.49 sq mi (3.86 km^{2})
  - Water: 0.015 sq mi (0.04 km^{2})
- Elevation: 505 ft (154 m)

Population (2020)
  - Total: 813
  - Density: 546/sq mi (210.8/km^{2})
- Time zone: UTC-5 (Eastern (EST))
  - Summer (DST): UTC-4 (EDT)
- ZIP code: 31078
- Area code: 478
- FIPS code: 13-65856
- GNIS feature ID: 0321670
- Website: cityofroberta.com

Roberta is a city in Crawford County, Georgia, United States. As of the 2020 census, Roberta had a population of 813. It is part of the Macon metropolitan statistical area.

== History ==
=== Creek Agency ===
In the early nineteenth century, Indian agent Benjamin Hawkins built his plantation on the Flint River near Roberta. This was also a trading post and the Creek Agency.

=== New Knoxville ===
Originally in Crawford County, Knoxville was the only stop in the county, until the A&F Railroad bypassed it by about a mile to the southwest when it was built in 1888. A train station was built, and a new town sprang up. People migrated towards this new town, called "New Knoxville."

Hiram David McCrary allowed the railroad to use part of his land, and was given naming rights to the town, which he named "Roberta" for his 7-year-old daughter. McCrary later became the owner of the first general store in Roberta, was its first elected mayor, co-owned its first motel, and served as tax collector and a railroad station agent.

In 1910, Roberta was incorporated as a city and was expanded in every direction by 1200 yards.

In 1949, the original train depot burned. It was replaced about a year later by a smaller concrete block building. A replica of the original depot was built in 2003 and currently houses the Chamber of Commerce Welcome Center.

=== Rise and demise ===
With the construction of the A&F Railroad and U.S. Highway 341, Roberta became a rapidly growing tourist town, with restaurants and hotels springing up. However, in the 1940s, passenger rail service ended in Roberta, ending one of the two main traffic flows. A decade later, Interstate 75 bypassed Roberta to the east, diverting much traffic. After these events, Roberta relaxed into a more small-town setting.

== Geography ==
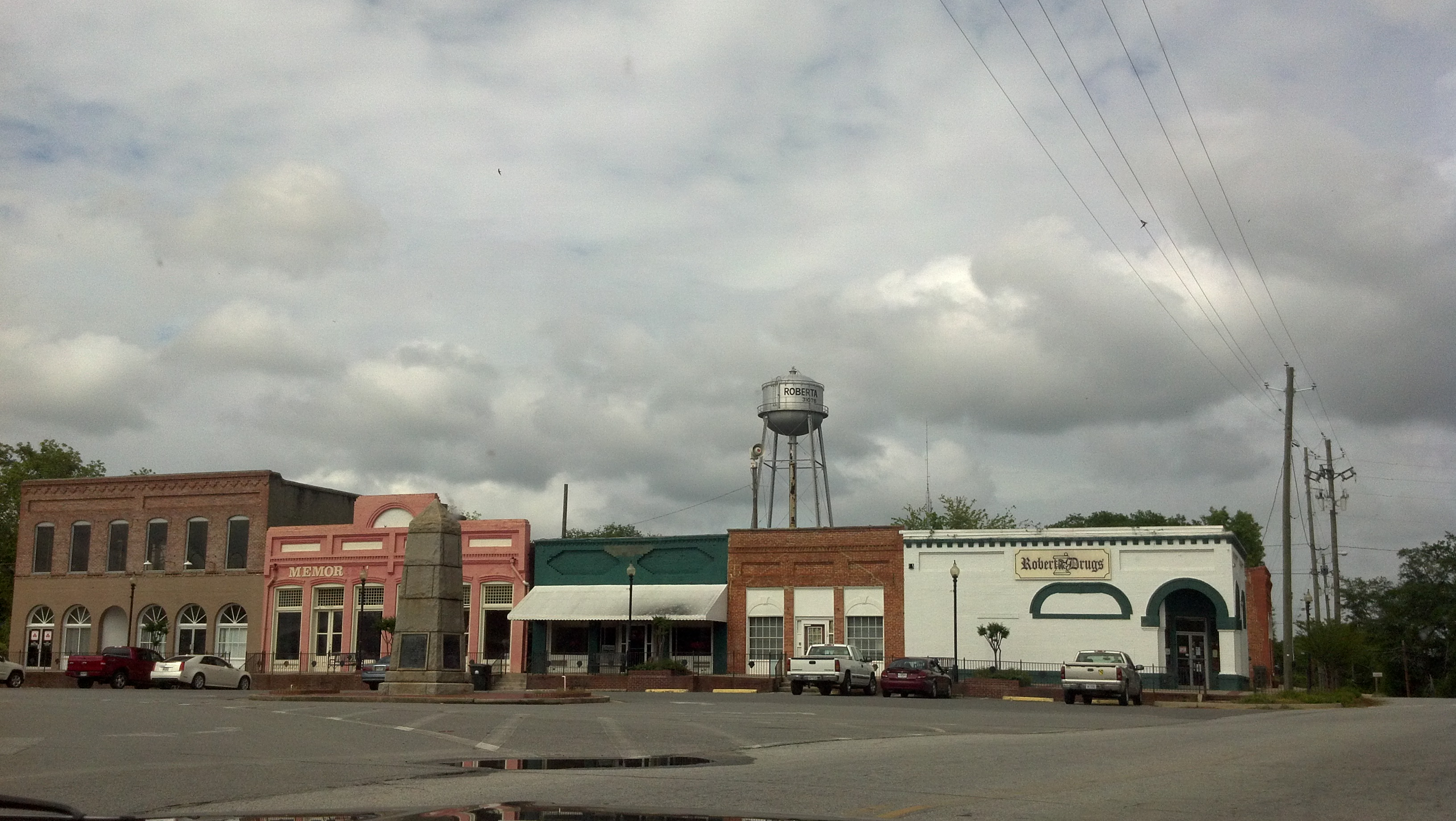
Downtown Roberta

Roberta is located near the center of Crawford County at 32°43′17″N 84°0′45″W (32.721283, -84.012512). U.S. Route 80 passes through the city, leading east 26 miles (42 km) to Macon and west 69 miles (111 km) to Columbus. U.S. Route 341 crosses US 80 in the city center, leading north 27 miles (43 km) to Barnesville and southeast 27 miles (43 km) to Perry.

The city is located roughly on the fall line of the eastern U.S., meaning that it is located between the hillier Piedmont region to the north and the flatter Atlantic coastal plain to the south.

According to the United States Census Bureau, Roberta has a total area of 1.5 square miles (3.9 km^{2}), of which 0.02 square miles (0.04 km^{2}), or 1.11%, is water.

== Demographics ==
Historical population
Census	Pop.	Note	%±
1900	252		—
1910	227		−9.9%
1920	404		78.0%
1930	449		11.1%
1940	535		19.2%
1950	673		25.8%
1960	714		6.1%
1970	746		4.5%
1980	859		15.1%
1990	939		9.3%
2000	808		−14.0%
2010	1,007		24.6%
2020	813		−19.3%
U.S. Decennial Census; 1850-1870 1870-1880; 1890-1910 1920-1930; 1940 1950 1960; 1970 1980 1990; 2000

Roberta racial composition as of 2020
Race	Num.	Perc.
White (non-Hispanic)	475	58.43%
Black or African American (non-Hispanic)	301	37.02%
Asian	5	0.62%
Pacific Islander	1	0.12%
Other/Mixed	21	2.58%
Hispanic or Latino	10	1.23%

As of the 2020 United States census, there were 813 people, 354 households, and 206 families residing in the city.

== Education ==
=== Crawford County School District ===
The Crawford County School District holds grades pre-school to grade twelve, and consists of one elementary school, a middle school, and a high school. The district has 127 full-time teachers and over 2,090 students.

- Crawford County Elementary School
- Crawford County Middle School
- Crawford County High School

== Tourism ==
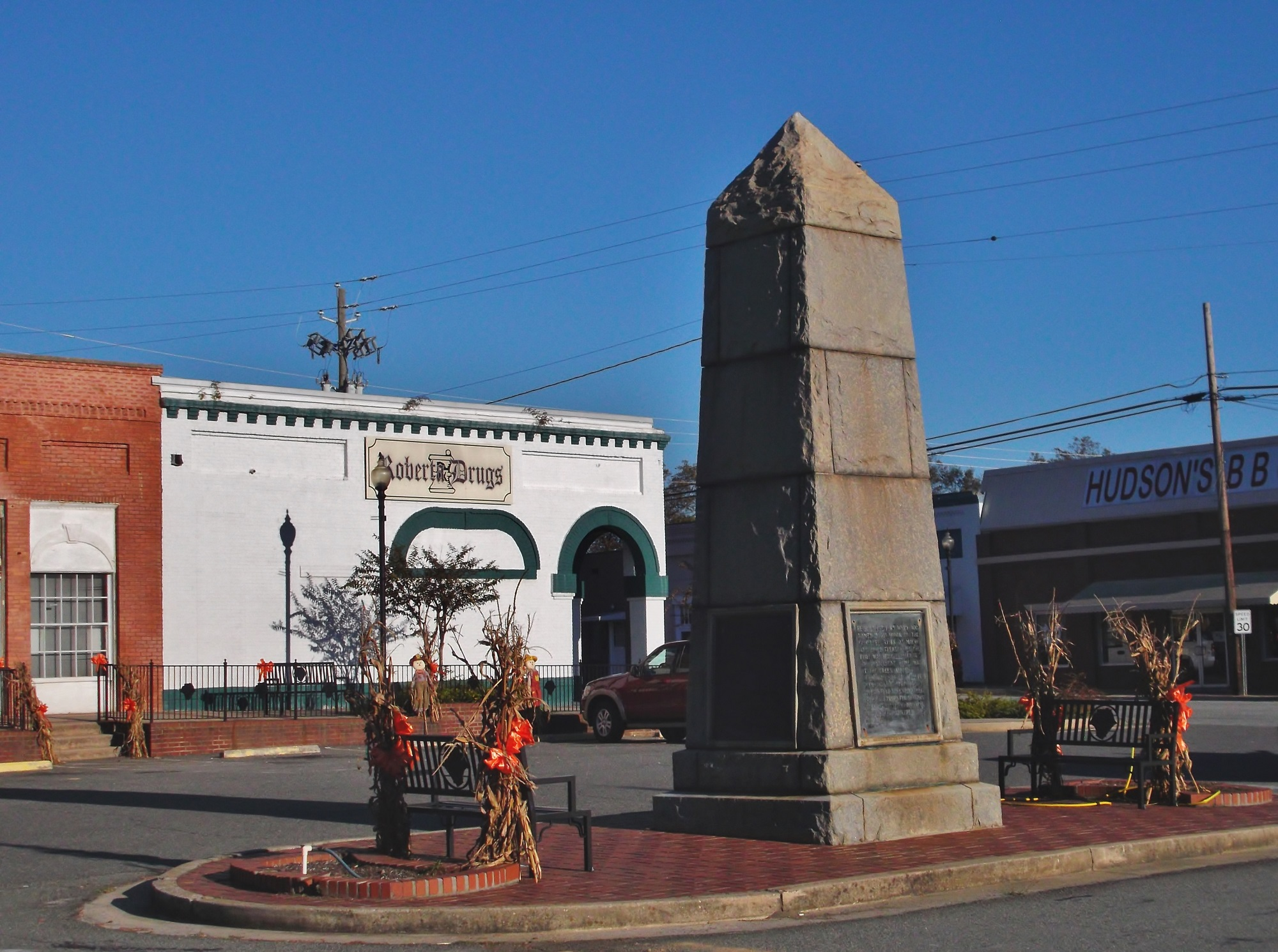
The Benjamin Hawkins Monument.

The city has a restored 1962 Seaboard Coastline caboose next to the railroad depot in the downtown area. The caboose holds a small history of Roberta's railroad heritage and a memorial to employees of Southern Railroad. Also in the downtown block is the Benjamin Hawkins Monument, constructed in 1931.
