= Crawford County, Georgia =

County in Georgia, United States

- County
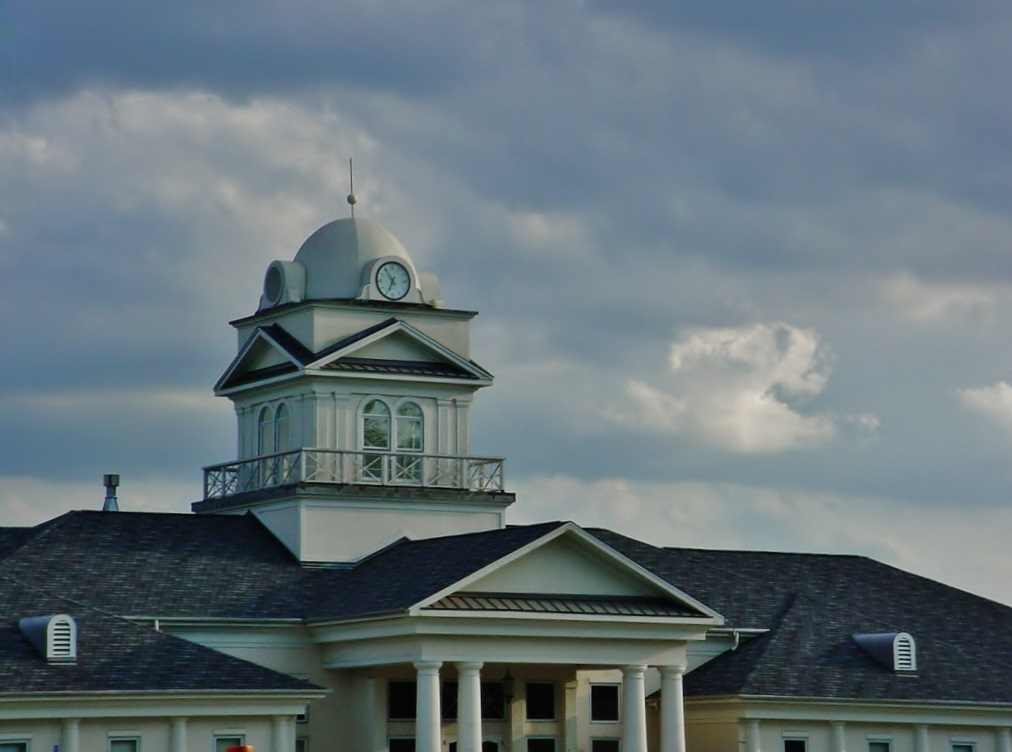
- Crawford County Courthouse in Knoxville

- Location within the U.S. state of Georgia
- Coordinates: 32°43′N 83°59′W
- Country: United States
- State: Georgia
- Founded: 1822; 204 years ago
- Named for: William H. Crawford
- Seat: Knoxville
- Largest city: Roberta

Area
  - Total: 326 sq mi (840 km^{2})
  - Land: 325 sq mi (840 km^{2})
  - Water: 1.6 sq mi (4.1 km^{2}) 0.5%

Population (2020)
  - Total: 12,130
  - Estimate (2025): 12,206 ▲
  - Density: 37/sq mi (14/km^{2})
- Time zone: UTC−5 (Eastern)
  - Summer (DST): UTC−4 (EDT)
- Congressional district: 2nd
- Website: https://www.crawfordcountyga.org/

Crawford County is a county located in the central portion of the U.S. state of Georgia. As of the 2020 census, the population was 12,130. The county seat is Knoxville. The largest municipality is Roberta.

Crawford County is included in the Macon, Georgia metropolitan area.

== History ==
Crawford County, in west central Georgia, is Georgia's fifty-seventh county. The 325-square-mile (840 km^{2}) county was created on December 9, 1822, from Houston County, which had been formed from land given up by the Creek Indians in the 1821 Treaty of Indian Springs. The county is named for statesman William H. Crawford who had served as a U.S. senator, minister to France, and secretary of the treasury.

The first white settlers in the area were Indian agent Benjamin Hawkins. Arriving in 1803, he developed a five-square-mile compound on the Flint River, with slave labor. The compound included a shop and plantation, which became known as the Creek Agency Reserve. Although Hawkins was well liked by the Creeks, he believed, as did many white men of his time, that the Indians should embrace a European-American way of life. His efforts to persuade the Creeks, however, were largely unsuccessful. Hawkins died at the reserve in 1816. David B. Mitchell was appointed in 1817 to replace the deceased Hawkins.

Knoxville, Georgia was established on the Federal Road, the main stagecoach route from Washington, D.C., to New Orleans, making the town a natural choice for county seat. Although the chief center of population is now Roberta, a mile to its west, Knoxville (no longer an incorporated city) retains its designation as the county seat. The current courthouse, built there in 2002, replaced one built in 1851, which still stands. The Old Courthouse is designated as a historical site and is used as a museum.

Roberta, originally called New Knoxville, is the only incorporated city in the county. It was incorporated on December 26, 1890. Roberta started out in 1886 as a railroad office and warehouse, "Roberta, ca. 1900," at the Atlanta and Florida Railway's "89 Fort Valley" milepost. Two years later, after a freight depot and passenger station were completed at the site, people began to settle in the immediate area. Townspeople gave the honor of naming the new town to Hiram McCrary, who had given the railroad the rights to come through his land. McCrary chose to call it Roberta in honor of his young daughter.

Most of the inhabitants of Knoxville, a mile away, moved to Roberta when the railroad arrived. For years, while passenger train service was an important mode of transportation, Roberta served as a thriving tourist stop on the route to Florida. After passenger train service gave way to the private automobile, Roberta relaxed into a quiet residential town. The rail tracks were taken up during the 1980s and only the rail bed remains. During 1950 through 1965 the tourist industry was revived by tourist traveling to and from coastal resorts by way of Highway US 341. This all ended when the interstate system diverted traffic away from Roberta to Macon, Georgia. The many diners and motels built to meet the tourist needs all but disappeared. Roberta is now a quiet, small Southern town. Other communities in Crawford county are Musella, Gaillard, Horns, Lee Pope, and Zenith.

Musella officially first appeared on the Georgia map in 1895. It appears that the Atlanta and Florida Railway (A&F) named the community Musella to identify it as a flag stop. The A&F began laying 105 miles (169 km) of track from Atlanta to Fort Valley in 1880. The railroad wanted to bring the track from Culloden to Knoxville, which was the most direct and economical route, but Crawford County rebelled. Crawford Countians didn't want the railroad passing through their county seat, so, the A&F laid the tracks to Musella instead. When Musella became a flag stop, the railroad offered better opportunities for farmers to market their products, so many of the residents of nearby Ceres, Georgia, (named after the Roman goddess of agriculture; settlement also called Hopewell) migrated to Musella. Since cotton could be shipped by rail, the cotton gin at Ceres was disassembled and moved approximately two miles to Musella. Soon, a general store and post office were built there, and Musella quickly became a hub of economic activity in northern Crawford County. Now it is a snapshot of the past.

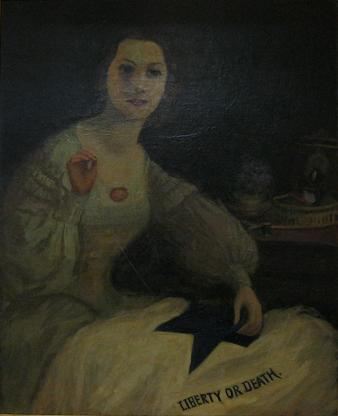
Joanna Troutman portrait in the Texas State Capitol

During the county's early days, settlers relied first on agriculture (cotton and oats) then on cattle ranching, timber harvesting, and sand extraction as economic mainstays. Agriculture continues to be important, as are manufacturing and health and social services. Many residents also work in neighboring areas.

Well-known figures from Crawford County include Jefferson Franklin Long, Georgia's first African-American congressional representative and the first African American to speak from the floor of the U.S. House of Representatives. Long, of mixed African and Caucasian ancestry, was born into slavery in Knoxville. As a freedman after the Civil War (1861–65), he became a tailor. His interest in equal rights led him to politics. He was elected to Congress in December 1870 and served until March 1871 during the Reconstruction era.

John Pemberton, the inventor of Coca-Cola, was also born in Knoxville. Pemberton was a veteran Confederate States of America lieutenant colonel who served on the first Georgia pharmacy licensing board after the war. His state-of-the-art laboratory for chemical analysis and manufacturing became the first state-run facility to conduct tests of soil and crop chemicals.

Joanna Troutman, who designed the first Lone Star flag (later adopted as the Texas State Flag), was born in Crawford County. She presented her flag to a Volunteer Georgia Battalion, who went to Texas in 1835 to assist Texans in their fight for independence. The flag was first flown at Velasco January 8, 1836, and was hoisted along with the Bloody Arm flag at Goliad on news of the declaration of independence March 8, 1836. Although Troutman lived most of her life in Knoxville, her remains were moved to the Texas State Cemetery in Austin, where a bronze statue was erected in her honor. A portrait of Troutman also hangs in the Texas State Capitol.

In 1775 naturalist William Bartram, traveling across Georgia, found a previously unknown plant in Crawford County. He named the plant Hydrangea Quercifolia—now commonly called Oakleaf Hydrangea. Bartram described the area near Sweetwater Creek as a "delightful diversified rural scene," noting that it "promises a happy, fruitful and salubrious region." See The Botanical Explorations of William Bartram in the Southeast by David H. Rembert Jr., Department of Biology, University of South Carolina—article and picture courtesy of Bartram Trail Conference.

Crawford County pottery was a thriving business in Crawford County during the 1800s and early 1900s. Men such as Long, Becham, Merritt, Pyles, and Dickson were known throughout the area for their utilitarian jugs and crocks. Clay from Crawford County and the Rich Hill alkaline glaze used by the early "jug makers" is still prized today.

Historic places to visit:

- Knoxville: The Old Jail (Est 1843) Museum and the Old Courthouse (Est 1832), which was re-built in 1851 after a fire, houses documents and local history. Knoxville is also the home of the annual Crawford County Pottery Jug Fest.
- Roberta: Historic Old Town Buildings, Replica of the original Train Depot and Passenger Station, Bejamin Hawkins Monument. Currently renovating a rail car Caboose for a railway Museum.
- West of Roberta off Highway US 80: The Museum of Southeastern Indians with its collection of Indian artifacts and Appalachian settler history.
- Musella: Dickey Farms (Est. 1897) has one of Georgia's oldest, continuously operating peach packing houses (built in 1936). Hays General Store (Est. 1900) has 110 years of continuous operation, and is one of the oldest stores of its kind in Georgia still in operation. Musella Baptist Church was founded in 1884; the current building was constructed in 1908, and is a beautiful example of traditional country church architecture.

== Geography ==
According to the U.S. Census Bureau, the county has a total area of 326 square miles (840 km^{2}), of which 325 square miles (840 km^{2}) is land and 1.6 square miles (4.1 km^{2}) (0.5%) is water.

The fall line of the eastern United States roughly bisects the county, meaning that northern portions of the county are generally hillier than southern portions of the county, which tend to be flatter and have a lot of farmland and agriculture. The Fall Line Freeway runs across a very small portion of the southern part of the county along Georgia State Route 96.

The western portion of Crawford County, west of Musella and Knoxville, is located in the Upper Flint River sub-basin of the ACF River Basin (Apalachicola-Chattahoochee-Flint River Basin). The northeastern portion of the county, northeast of Byron, is located in the Upper Ocmulgee River sub-basin of the Altamaha River basin. A southeastern corner of Crawford County, north of Fort Valley, is located in the Lower Ocmulgee River sub-basin of the same Altamaha River basin.

=== Major highways ===
- Interstate 75 / State Route 401 (unsigned)
- U.S. Route 80 / State Route 22
- U.S. Route 341 / State Route 7
- State Route 42
- State Route 96
- State Route 128
- State Route 540 (Fall Line Freeway)

=== Adjacent counties ===
- Monroe County – north
- Bibb County – east-northeast
- Peach County – east-southeast
- Taylor County – southwest
- Macon County – south
- Upson County – northwest
- Houston County- Extreme East at Echeconee Creek

== Communities ==
=== City ===
- Roberta

=== Census-designated place ===
- Knoxville
- Musella

=== Unincorporated communities ===
- Lizella
- Zenith

== Demographics ==
Historical population
Census	Pop.	Note	%±
1830	5,313		—
1840	7,981		50.2%
1850	8,984		12.6%
1860	7,693		−14.4%
1870	7,557		−1.8%
1880	8,656		14.5%
1890	9,315		7.6%
1900	10,368		11.3%
1910	8,310		−19.8%
1920	8,893		7.0%
1930	7,020		−21.1%
1940	7,128		1.5%
1950	6,080		−14.7%
1960	5,816		−4.3%
1970	5,748		−1.2%
1980	7,684		33.7%
1990	8,991		17.0%
2000	12,495		39.0%
2010	12,630		1.1%
2020	12,130		−4.0%
2025 (est.)	12,206	▲	0.6%
U.S. Decennial Census; 1790-1880 1890-1910; 1920-1930 1930-1940; 1940-1950 1960-1980; 1980-2000 2010

=== Racial and ethnic composition ===
Crawford County, Georgia – Racial and ethnic composition Note: the US Census treats Hispanic/Latino as an ethnic category. This table excludes Latinos from the racial categories and assigns them to a separate category. Hispanics/Latinos may be of any race.
Race / Ethnicity (NH = Non-Hispanic)	Pop 1980	Pop 1990	Pop 2000	Pop 2010	Pop 2020	% 1980	% 1990	% 2000	% 2010	% 2020
White alone (NH)	4,593	6,045	9,037	9,282	8,866	59.77%	67.23%	72.32%	73.49%	73.09%
Black or African American alone (NH)	2,998	2,751	2,970	2,806	2,267	39.02%	30.60%	23.77%	22.22%	18.69%
Native American or Alaska Native alone (NH)	4	33	39	52	45	0.05%	0.37%	0.31%	0.41%	0.37%
Asian alone (NH)	10	13	21	32	31	0.13%	0.14%	0.17%	0.25%	0.26%
Native Hawaiian or Pacific Islander alone (NH)	x	x	2	2	3	x	x	0.02%	0.02%	0.02%
Other race alone (NH)	0	0	19	7	44	0.00%	0.00%	0.15%	0.06%	0.36%
Mixed race or Multiracial (NH)	x	x	106	148	459	x	x	0.85%	1.17%	3.78%
Hispanic or Latino (any race)	79	149	301	301	415	1.03%	1.66%	2.41%	2.38%	3.42%
Total	7,684	8,991	12,495	12,630	12,130	100.00%	100.00%	100.00%	100.00%	100.00%

=== 2020 census ===
As of the 2020 census, the county had a population of 12,130. The median age was 45.5 years. 20.8% of residents were under the age of 18 and 19.6% of residents were 65 years of age or older. For every 100 females there were 99.5 males, and for every 100 females age 18 and over there were 98.4 males age 18 and over. 0.0% of residents lived in urban areas, while 100.0% lived in rural areas.

The racial makeup of the county was 74.3% White, 18.7% Black or African American, 0.5% American Indian and Alaska Native, 0.3% Asian, 0.0% Native Hawaiian and Pacific Islander, 1.3% from some other race, and 5.0% from two or more races. Hispanic or Latino residents of any race comprised 3.4% of the population.

There were 4,679 households in the county, of which 30.1% had children under the age of 18 living with them and 25.4% had a female householder with no spouse or partner present. About 24.4% of all households were made up of individuals and 10.9% had someone living alone who was 65 years of age or older.

There were 5,154 housing units, of which 9.2% were vacant. Among occupied housing units, 79.8% were owner-occupied and 20.2% were renter-occupied. The homeowner vacancy rate was 0.9% and the rental vacancy rate was 5.3%.

== Politics ==
As of the 2020s, Crawford County is a strongly Republican voting county, voting over 74% for Donald Trump in 2024. For elections to the United States House of Representatives, Crawford County is part of Georgia's 2nd congressional district, currently represented by Sanford Bishop. For elections to the Georgia State Senate, Crawford County is part of District 18. For elections to the Georgia House of Representatives, Crawford County is part of District 134.

United States presidential election results for Crawford County, Georgia
Year	Republican		Democratic		Third party(ies)	
Year	No.	%	No.	%	No.	%
1912	3	1.19%	249	98.42%	1	0.40%
1916	4	0.96%	411	98.56%	2	0.48%
1920	65	21.67%	235	78.33%	0	0.00%
1924	7	1.87%	352	94.12%	15	4.01%
1928	48	11.82%	358	88.18%	0	0.00%
1932	9	3.20%	272	96.80%	0	0.00%
1936	22	5.03%	413	94.51%	2	0.46%
1940	74	16.93%	362	82.84%	1	0.23%
1944	149	28.44%	375	71.56%	0	0.00%
1948	64	9.01%	389	54.79%	257	36.20%
1952	145	13.27%	948	86.73%	0	0.00%
1956	109	12.27%	779	87.73%	0	0.00%
1960	203	20.30%	797	79.70%	0	0.00%
1964	957	56.96%	723	43.04%	0	0.00%
1968	246	15.18%	489	30.17%	886	54.66%
1972	1,167	69.51%	512	30.49%	0	0.00%
1976	378	17.03%	1,842	82.97%	0	0.00%
1980	642	27.03%	1,673	70.44%	60	2.53%
1984	1,298	47.70%	1,423	52.30%	0	0.00%
1988	1,235	47.55%	1,340	51.60%	22	0.85%
1992	974	30.60%	1,648	51.78%	561	17.62%
1996	1,290	41.57%	1,534	49.44%	279	8.99%
2000	1,987	55.71%	1,513	42.42%	67	1.88%
2004	2,830	64.20%	1,552	35.21%	26	0.59%
2008	3,358	63.99%	1,832	34.91%	58	1.11%
2012	3,368	65.47%	1,706	33.16%	70	1.36%
2016	3,635	70.23%	1,421	27.45%	120	2.32%
2020	4,428	72.57%	1,615	26.47%	59	0.97%
2024	4,742	74.79%	1,582	24.95%	16	0.25%

United States Senate election results for Crawford County, Georgia2
Year	Republican		Democratic		Third party(ies)	
Year	No.	%	No.	%	No.	%
2020	4,330	71.86%	1,561	25.90%	135	2.24%
2020	3,879	72.30%	1,486	27.70%	0	0.00%

United States Senate election results for Crawford County, Georgia3
Year	Republican		Democratic		Third party(ies)	
Year	No.	%	No.	%	No.	%
2020	2,281	38.03%	1,172	19.54%	2,545	42.43%
2020	3,869	72.04%	1,502	27.96%	0	0.00%
2022	3,440	71.43%	1,298	26.95%	78	1.62%
2022	3,196	72.24%	1,228	27.76%	0	0.00%

Georgia Gubernatorial election results for Crawford County
Year	Republican		Democratic		Third party(ies)	
Year	No.	%	No.	%	No.	%
2022	3,633	75.14%	1,171	24.22%	31	0.64%

== See also ==
- National Register of Historic Places listings in Crawford County, Georgia
- List of counties in Georgia
