= 1905–06 Georgia Bulldogs basketball team =

American college basketball season

1905–06 Georgia Bulldogs basketball
- Conference: Southern Intercollegiate Athletic Association
- Record: 0–2 (0–2 SIAA)
- Head coach: Walter T. Forbes (1st season)
- Captain: Haywood Dean
- Home arena: Athens YMCA

1905–06 Southern Intercollegiate Athletic Association men's basketball standings
	Conf.				Overall
Team	W		L	PCT	W		L	PCT
Auburn	3	–	0	1.000	5	–	1	.833
Nashville	2	–	0	1.000	9	–	0	1.000
Georgia Tech	2	–	1	.667	2	–	1	.667
Tulane	0	–	1	.000	8	–	5	.615
Mercer	0	–	1	.000	0	–	2	.000
Cumberland (TN)	0	–	2	.000	0	–	2	.000
Georgia	0	–	2	.000	0	–	2	.000
Howard (AL)	-	–	-	–	1	–	0	1.000
Vanderbilt	-	–	-	–	-	–	-	–

The 1905–06 Georgia Bulldogs basketball team represented the University of Georgia as a member of the Southern Intercollegiate Athletic Association (SIAA) during the 1905–06 collegiate men's basketball season in the United States. Led by first-year head coach Walter T. Forbes, the Bulldogs compiled an overall record of 0–2 with an identical mark in conference play.

== Schedule ==
Date time, TV	Opponent	Result	Record	Site city, state
March 10*	Georgia Tech	L 13–27	0–1	Athens YMCA; Athens, GA
March 17*	at Georgia Tech	L 11–12	0–2	Athens YMCA; Athens, GA
*Non-conference game. (#) Tournament seedings in parentheses.
