= 1905–06 Auburn Tigers men's basketball team =

American college basketball season

1905–06 Auburn Tigers men's basketball
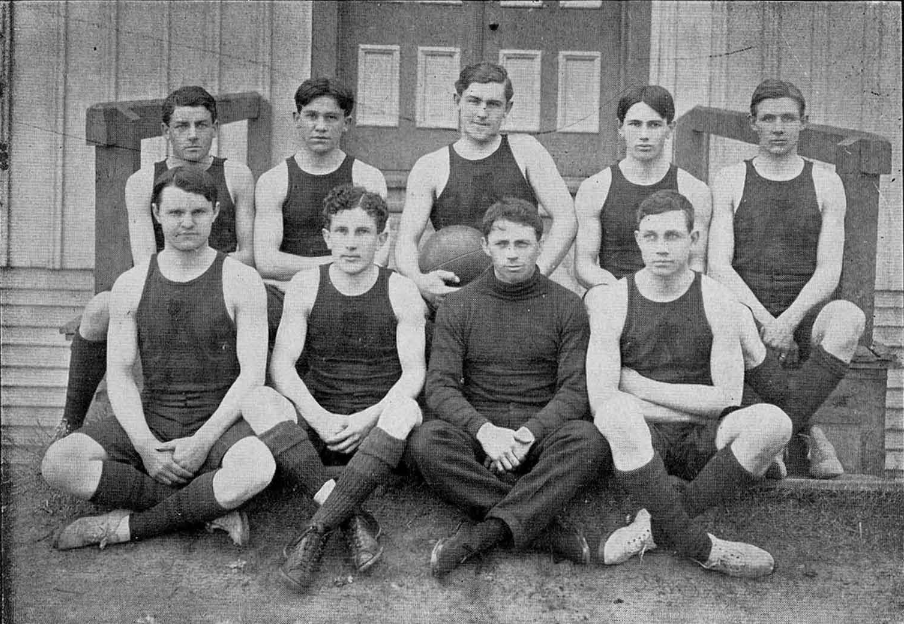

SIAA champion
- Conference: Southern Intercollegiate Athletic Association
- Record: 5–1–1 (3–0 SIAA)
- Head coach: Mike Donahue (1st season)
- Captain: Frank Jones
- Home arena: The Gymnasium

1905–06 Southern Intercollegiate Athletic Association men's basketball standings
	Conf.				Overall
Team	W		L	PCT	W		L	PCT
Auburn	3	–	0	1.000	5	–	1	.833
Nashville	2	–	0	1.000	9	–	0	1.000
Georgia Tech	2	–	1	.667	2	–	1	.667
Tulane	0	–	1	.000	8	–	5	.615
Mercer	0	–	1	.000	0	–	2	.000
Cumberland (TN)	0	–	2	.000	0	–	2	.000
Georgia	0	–	2	.000	0	–	2	.000
Howard (AL)	-	–	-	–	1	–	0	1.000
Vanderbilt	-	–	-	–	-	–	-	–

The 1905–06 Auburn Tigers men's basketball team represented Auburn University in the 1905–06 college basketball season. This was the first men's basketball team ever to represent Auburn University. The team's head coach was Mike Donahue, who was in his first season at Auburn. The team played their home games at The Gymnasium in Auburn, Alabama. They finished the season 5–1–1. The team beat Mercer 64 to 8, and beat Georgia Tech 26 to 6 in the first intercollegiate basketball game in Atlanta.

Basketball seemed to take off in the South in 1906, when Yale's basketball team traveled throughout the South. Auburn's two forwards, Bob Ware and Charlie Woodruff, played with Birmingham Athletic Club when it defeated Yale 24 to 18 on January 1, 1906. Auburn and B. A. C. battled to a 14 to 14 tie. The rules called for sudden-death overtime, but Auburn captain Frank Jones refused to play the overtime period because he felt the referees weren't calling a fair game.

== Schedule ==
Date time, TV	Opponent	Result	Record	Site city, state
January 19, 1906	Tulane	W 26–7	1–0	The Gymnasium; Auburn, AL
February 3*	Montgomery Athletic Club	W 32–18	2–0	The Gymnasium; Auburn, AL
February 7*	Columbus YMCA	L 16–18	2–1	
February 10*	at Atlanta Athletic Club	W 27–17	4–1	Atlanta, GA
February 16	Mercer	W 62–8	3–1	The Gymnasium; Auburn, AL
February 17	at Georgia Tech	W 26–6	5–1	Peachtree Auditorium; Atlanta, GA
March 16*	at Birmingham Athletic Club	T 14–14	5–1–1	Birmingham, AL
*Non-conference game. (#) Tournament seedings in parentheses.
