= Bruce Dalrymple =

American former basketball player

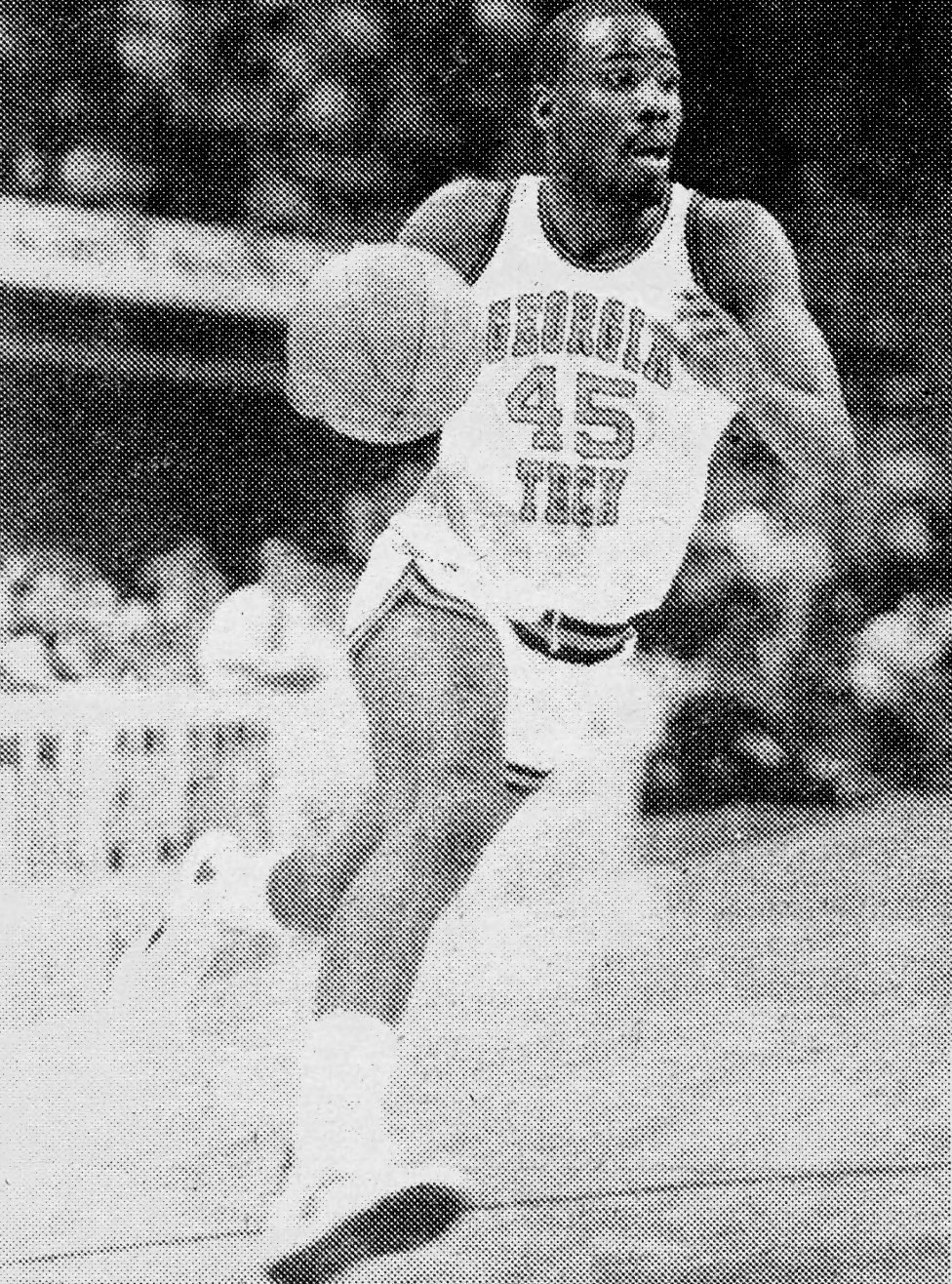
- Dalrymple playing for Georgia Tech in 1985

Personal information
- Born: April 21, 1964 (age 62) Manhattan, New York, U.S.
- Listed height: 6 ft 4 in (1.93 m)
- Listed weight: 210 lb (95 kg)

Career information
- High school: St. Johnsbury Academy (St. Johnsbury, Vermont)
- College: Georgia Tech (1983–1987)
- NBA draft: 1987: 2nd round, 46th overall pick
- Drafted by: Phoenix Suns
- Position: Shooting guard

Career history
- 1987–1988: Rockford Lightning

Career highlights
- ACC Rookie of the Year (1984); McDonald's All-American (1983); Second-team Parade All-American (1983); Fourth-team Parade All-American (1982)
- Stats at Basketball Reference

Henry Van "Bruce" Dalrymple (born April 21, 1964) is an American former basketball player best known for his college career at Georgia Tech. He was a second round pick in the 1987 NBA draft.

Dalrymple was born in Manhattan, but attended prep school St. Johnsbury Academy in St. Johnsbury, Vermont on a basketball scholarship. While there, he led the school to its first state championship as a junior, then a runner-up finish as a senior. Dalrymple was named a McDonald's and Parade high school All-American.

Dalrymple chose Georgia Tech, coached by fellow New Yorker Bobby Cremins. He joined future National Basketball Association (NBA) players Mark Price, John Salley and Yvon Joseph in the starting lineup as a freshman, averaging 13.6 points, 6.9 rebounds and 2.2 assists per game and was named Atlantic Coast Conference Rookie of the Year.

In Dalrymple's sophomore season, the Yellow Jackets added Duane Ferrell and the team won both the ACC regular season and tournament championships, finishing the season 27–8 after losing to Georgetown in the elite eight of the NCAA tournament. The next season, Dalrymple was featured with senior backcourt partner Price on the cover of Sports Illustrated as Georgia Tech was the magazine's preseason number one. The team went 27–7 and made it to the Sweet Sixteen of the 1986 NCAA tournament.

After the close of his Yellow Jackets career, Dalrymple was drafted in the second round (46th pick) of the 1987 NBA draft by the Phoenix Suns. Considered a tweener (seen as too small to play as a forward but without the shooting ability to play shooting guard in the NBA), he did not make the Suns' final roster. He played briefly with the Rockford Lightning in the Continental Basketball Association (CBA) during the 1987–88 season, before retiring from professional basketball.

== College statistics ==
Year	Team	GP	GS	MPG	FG%	3P%	FT%	RPG	APG	SPG	BPG	PPG
1983–84	Georgia Tech	29	29	34.6	.477	–	.754	6.9	2.2	1.4	0.2	13.6
1984–85	Georgia Tech	35	35	35.6	.501	–	.727	5.9	3.9	1.9	0.1	12.9
1985–86	Georgia Tech	34	34	32.9	.521	–	.634	5.0	4.1	2.1	0.1	10.8
1986–87	Georgia Tech	28	28	34.4	.439	.267	.720	5.9	3.9	1.8	0.1	13.4
Career		126	126	34.4	.484	.267	.713	5.9	3.5	1.8	0.1	12.6
