= Georgia Tech Yellow Jackets men's basketball =

Men's college basketball team

| 2026–27 Georgia Tech Yellow Jackets men's basketball team |
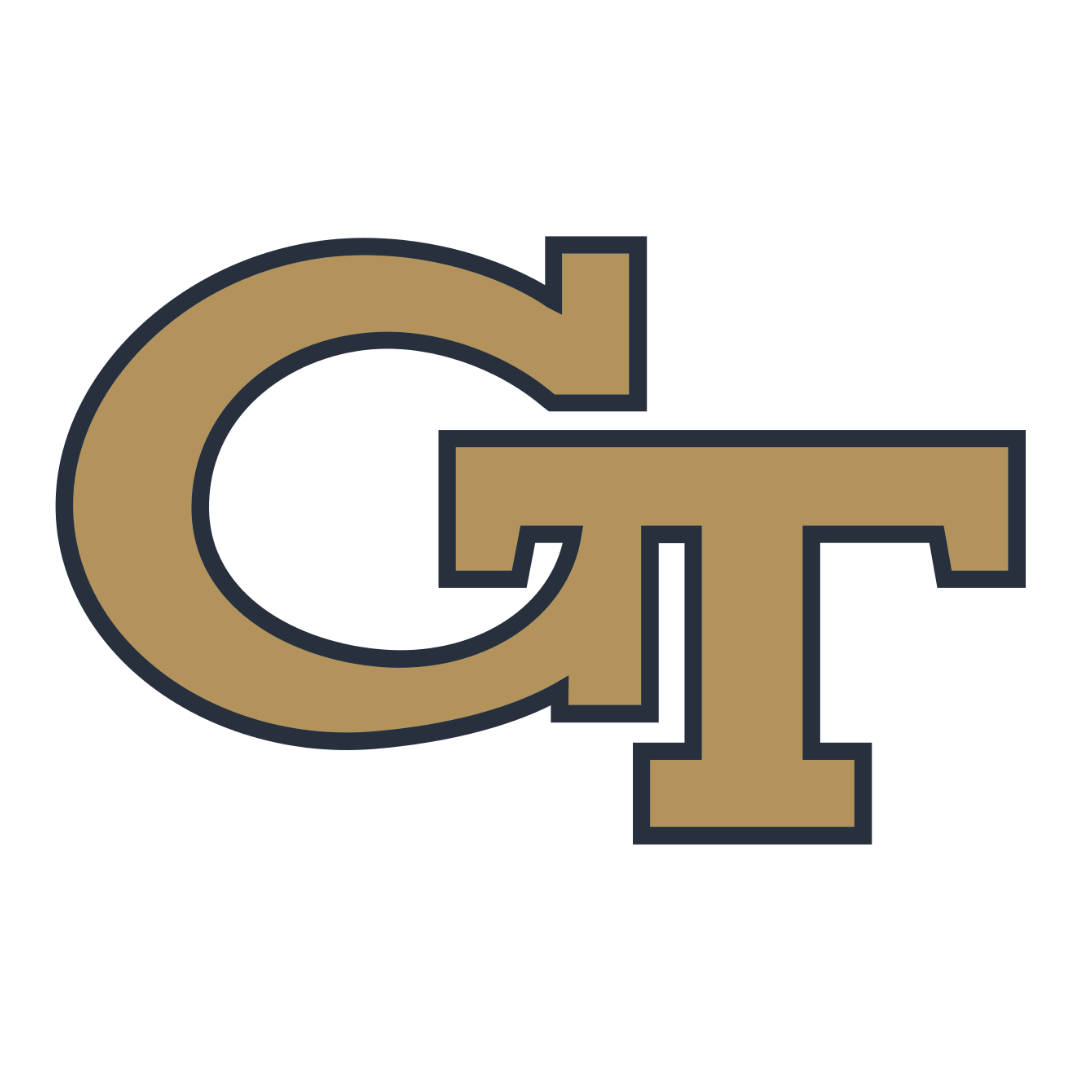
- Institution: Georgia Institute of Technology
- First season: 1905–06; 121 years ago
- Athletic director: Ryan Alpert
- Head coach: Scott Cross (1st season)
- Location: Atlanta, Georgia
- Arena: McCamish Pavilion (capacity: 8,600)
- NCAA division: Division I
- Conference: ACC
- Nickname: Yellow Jackets
- Colors: Gold and white
- All-time record: 1469–1345 (.522)
- NCAA tournament record: 23–17 (.575)

NCAA Division I tournament runner-up
- 2004
Other NCAA Division I tournament results
| Final Four | 1990, 2004 |
| Elite Eight | 1960, 1985, 1990, 2004 |
| Sweet Sixteen | 1960, 1985, 1986, 1990, 1992, 1996, 2004 |
| Appearances | 1960, 1985, 1986, 1987, 1988, 1989, 1990, 1991, 1992, 1993, 1996, 2001, 2004, 2005, 2007, 2010, 2021 |

Conference tournament champions
- SEC: 1938 ACC: 1985, 1990, 1993, 2021

Conference regular-season champions
- SEC: 1938 ACC: 1985, 1996

Uniforms
| Home | Away | Alternate |

The Georgia Tech Yellow Jackets men's basketball team represents the Georgia Tech Yellow Jackets in NCAA Division I basketball. The team plays its home games in McCamish Pavilion on the school's Atlanta campus and is currently coached by Scott Cross. Bobby Cremins led his team to the first ACC tournament victory in school history in 1985 and in 1990 he took Georgia Tech to the school's first Final Four appearance ever. Cremins retired from Georgia Tech in 2000 with the school's best winning percentage as a head coach. The Yellow Jackets returned to the Final Four in 2004 under Paul Hewitt and lost in the national title game to UConn. Overall, the team has won 1,352 games and lost 1,226 games, a .524 win percentage.

== History ==
Basketball was invented by Springfield College teacher James Naismith in 1891. It seemed to take off in the Southern colleges in 1906, when Yale's basketball team traveled throughout the South. That year Georgia Tech organized a small basketball club under Coach Chapman. Tech lost to Auburn in the first college basketball game played in Atlanta, and won the two other games they played that season, against rival Georgia.

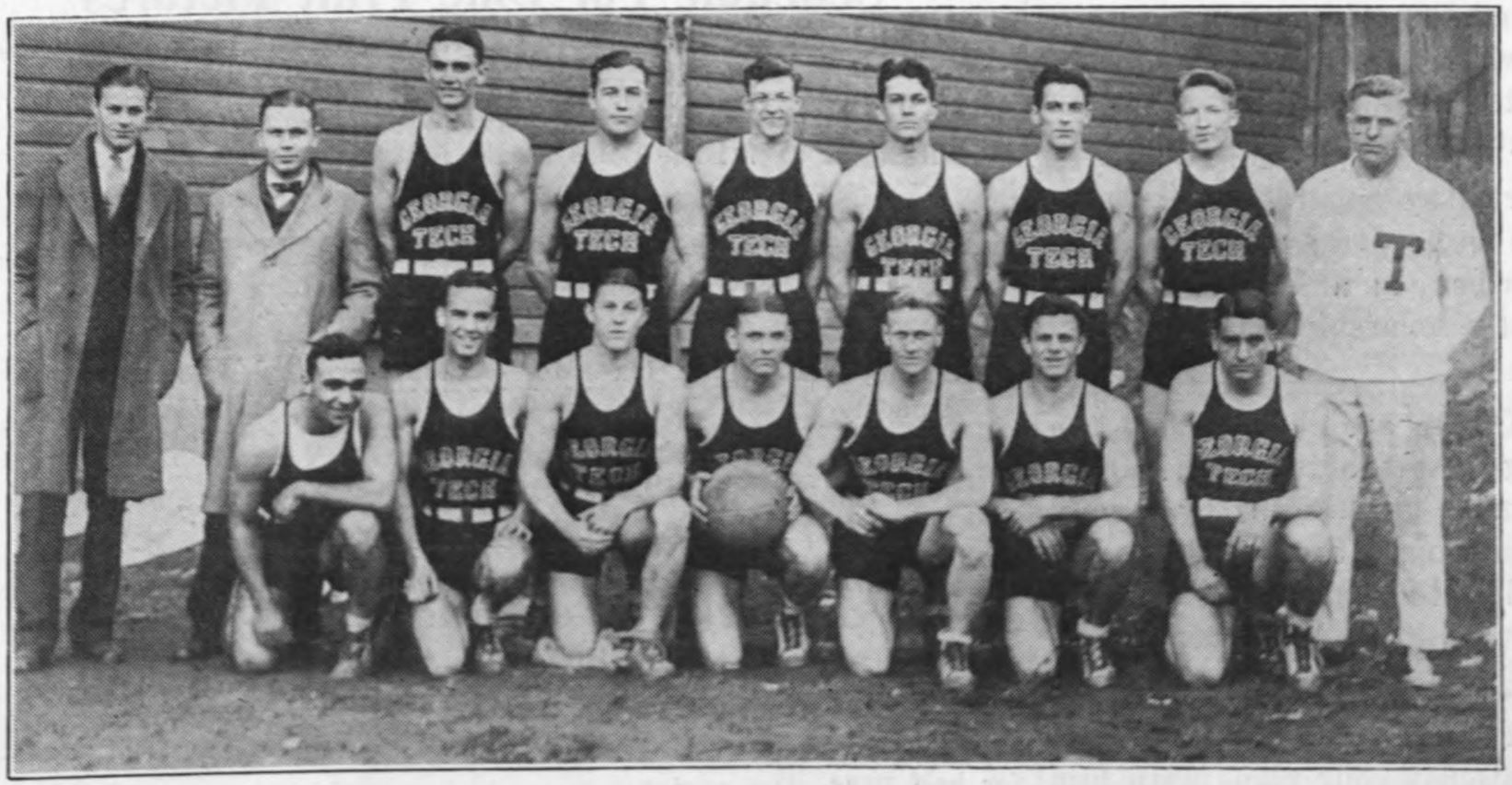
The 1925–26 team

In 1909, continuous dribbling and shots off the dribble were allowed. Tech organized another basketball team, under famous coach John Heisman, also Tech's baseball and football coach. Heisman had a winning percentage of .142 that season and improved the team's percentage to .500 in 1912 and 1913. Heisman wasn't able to keep up with a basketball team, and his successor Bill Alexander revived the Georgia Tech basketball program in 1920. From 1924 to 1926, the team was coached by Harold Hansen, also the football team's backfield coach.

=== Roy Mundorff ===
Roy Mundorff coached Georgia Tech basketball from 1927 to 1942. Georgia Tech became a charter member of the Southeastern Conference in 1932 (the first season was in 1933). The 1936-37 team was captained by future Tech coach John Hyder and posted an 11-1 conference record. Tech won the conference title the next season in 1938.

=== Dwight Keith ===
During World War II, the basketball team was coached by assistant football coach Dwight Keith.

=== Roy McArthur ===
Former Tech quarterback Roy McArthur coached the team after the war. He was "among the forerunners of the present run-and-shoot brand of basketball".

=== John Hyder ===
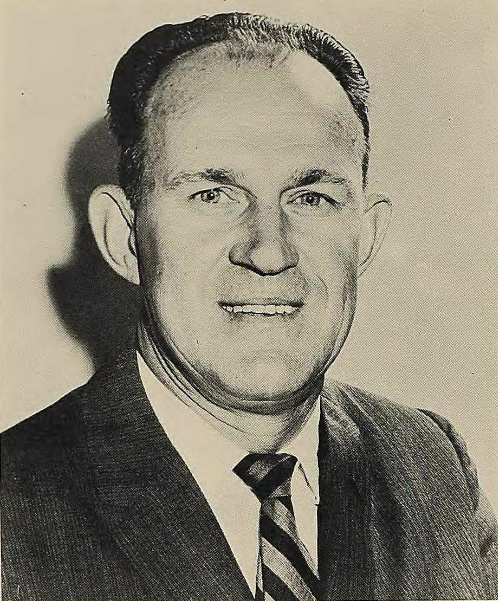
John Hyder

Coach John Hyder, whose teams won 292 games in 22 seasons, put the program on the national map when his 1955 team defeated Adolph Rupp's Kentucky team, ending the Wildcats' 129-game winning streak at home.

The Yellow Jackets played their first NCAA tournament game in 1960. Led by all-American Roger Kaiser, the team defeated Ohio University before losing in the second round to the eventual champion, Ohio State. Hyder continued to have strong teams in the 1960s and 1970s. In 1964, Georgia Tech's final season in the Southeastern Conference, the team went undefeated at home and was the conference runner-up. In 1971 the Yellow Jackets, led by Rich Yunkus, reached the finals of the National Invitation Tournament but lost to the University of North Carolina.

Georgia Tech became a charter member of the Metro Conference in 1975 (the first season started in 1976), and then became the eighth member of the Atlantic Coast Conference (ACC) in 1978 (starting play in 1979). As of the 2020–21 season, the Yellow Jackets have won four ACC tournament championships and been the ACC's top seed twice. Through 2021, Georgia Tech has received 17 berths in the NCAA tournament, and seven of its teams have made it to the Sweet Sixteen.

=== Bobby Cremins ===
The 1985 team, led by head coach Bobby Cremins and players Mark Price, Duane Ferrell, Yvon Joseph, Craig Neal, Bruce Dalrymple, and John Salley, won the school's first ACC championship and advanced to the final eight in the NCAA tournament. Tom Hammonds earned Rookie of the Year honors in the ACC in 1986. In the 1990 tournament, the trio of Kenny Anderson, Dennis Scott, and Brian Oliver (nicknamed "Lethal Weapon 3") carried the Yellow Jackets all the way to the Final Four, where they lost to eventual champion UNLV in the national semi-finals. In 1992, Cremins led an inexperienced Tech team to the Sweet 16, thanks in no small part to James Forrest's buzzer-beating game-winning three-pointer in the second round against USC. The following year, the Yellow Jackets won the ACC tournament.

Georgia Tech's nine consecutive appearances in the NCAA Tournament from the mid-1980s and the early 1990s accounted for the nation's fourth-longest active streak before it ended in 1994. In 1996, the team finished first in the ACC's regular season and returned to the tournament behind future NBA All-Star Stephon Marbury. In 1998, Matt Harpring was third-team All-American.

Cremins's 19-year tenure (1981–2000) stands as the team's most successful era. Cremins is Georgia Tech's all-time winningest coach and is third among all ACC coaches. Upon his retirement after the 1999–2000 season, his teams had won 354 games and lost 237 for a .599 winning percentage (Cremins would later come out of retirement to coach at the College of Charleston). The floor at McCamish Pavilion is named "Cremins Court" in his honor.

=== Paul Hewitt ===
In 2000, head coach Paul Hewitt was hired away from Siena College and immediately helped to revitalize the Yellow Jacket program. In his first season, Georgia Tech beat UCLA, Kentucky and five ACC rivals that were ranked en route to an NCAA tournament appearance. Georgia Tech experienced a Cinderella season in 2003–04: winning the Preseason NIT, ending Duke's 41-game winning streak at Cameron Indoor Stadium, making it to the school's second Final Four and first national championship game, in which they lost by nine points to UConn. Notable players sent to the NBA under Hewitt include Chris Bosh, Jarrett Jack, Mario West, Luke Schenscher, Thaddeus Young, Will Bynum, and Anthony Morrow. In back-to-back years (2008 & 2009), Hewitt also successfully recruited national top-10 high school prospects in Iman Shumpert and Derrick Favors.

During the 2009–10 season, the Yellow Jackets played for the ACC tournament championship game as well as earning Hewitt's fifth NCAA tournament appearance at Tech. They advanced to the round of 32, losing to Ohio State. Georgia Tech then finished the 2010–11 season 13–18. On March 12, 2011, Paul Hewitt was dismissed as the head coach of the Georgia Tech after eleven seasons. Brian Gregory was appointed as his successor, Georgia Tech's 13th men's basketball coach, on March 28, 2011.

=== Brian Gregory ===
Brian Gregory, who led Dayton to 97 victories over his last four seasons there and worked under Tom Izzo at Michigan State when the Spartans won the 2000 NCAA championship, was named Georgia Tech's head men's basketball coach on March 28, 2011. In their first season with Gregory at the helm, Georgia Tech finished 11–20 and 11th in the ACC while playing without a true home court while McCamish Pavilion was under construction. Gregory only had two seasons with overall winning records and no seasons of winning records in ACC play. On March 25, 2016, after five disappointing seasons and no trips to the NCAA tournament, Georgia Tech fired Brian Gregory. He was 76–86 overall and 27–61 in ACC play.

=== Josh Pastner ===
Josh Pastner was hired by the school on April 8, 2016. Pastner was 167–73 with four NCAA tournament bids in seven years as the head coach of Memphis.

Pastner took Tech to the NIT finals in his first season, and was that season's ACC Coach of the Year. After that season Tech was hit with NCAA violations, although most punishments would later be dropped. Because of this, Tech struggled for the next few seasons. However, Pastner ultimately led the team to their first ACC title since 1993, as well as their first NCAA tournament berth since 2010, as the Yellow Jackets defeated Florida State to win the 2021 ACC championship. They would end up losing to Loyola Chicago in the first round of the NCAA tournament. It is Tech's latest postseason appearance.

The success wouldn’t last though, Tech parted ways with Pastner on March 10, 2023 following two disappointing seasons. He finished 109–114 in his seven years coaching the Jackets. He finished as the fourth-winningest coach in school history, behind only Hewitt, Hyder, and Cremins.

=== Damon Stoudamire ===
On March 13, 2023 Damon Stoudamire was named the fifteenth coach in program history. Stoudamire came to Georgia Tech after serving as an assistant coach of the NBA's Boston Celtics for nearly two seasons. Before that he served as the head coach at the University of the Pacific from 2016 to 2021.

Damon Stoudamire became the first Tech coach in the Yellow Jackets’ ACC history to defeat Duke in his first try when the Yellow Jackets stunned the then seventh ranked Blue Devils 72–68 on December 2, 2023. He became the third coach in ACC history to beat Duke and North Carolina in his first year when on January 30, 2024, Tech beat #3 UNC 74–73 in front of a sold out home crowd.

Stoudamire's first team finished 14–18 despite the big wins, but in his second year at the helm Tech would turn an 8–11 start into a 17–16 record at the end of the ACC Tournament. The Yellow Jackets were invited to the 2025 NIT, which marked their first postseason appearance since the 2021 ACC championship season. After the positive momentum from the 24–25 season, people hoped that Damon’s third season would see further progress. However, after starting the season 11–8, the Yellow Jackets ended their 2025–26 season with twelve straight losses, finishing 11–20 and last in the ACC. A day after the season ended, Stoudamire was fired. He had a 42–55 record at Georgia Tech.

== Postseason ==
=== NCAA tournament results ===
The Yellow Jackets have appeared in the NCAA tournament 17 times. Their combined record is 23–17.

| Year | Seed | Round | Opponent | Result |
|---|---|---|---|---|
| 1960 | | Sweet Sixteen; Elite Eight | Ohio; Ohio State | W 57–54; L 69–86 |
| 1985 | #2 | First Round; Second Round; Sweet Sixteen; Elite Eight | #15 Mercer #7 Syracuse #3 Illinois #1 Georgetown | W 65–58; W 70–53; W 61–53; L 54–60 |
| 1986 | #2 | First Round; Second Round; Sweet Sixteen | #15 Marist #10 Villanova #11 LSU | W 68–53; W 66–61; L 64–70 |
| 1987 | #7 | First Round | #10 LSU | L 79–85 |
| 1988 | #5 | First Round; Second Round | #12 Iowa State #13 Richmond | W 90–78; L 55–59 |
| 1989 | #6 | First Round | #11 Texas | L 70–76 |
| 1990 | #4 | First Round; Second Round; Sweet Sixteen; Elite Eight; Final Four | #13 East Tennessee State #5 LSU #1 Michigan State #6 Minnesota #1 UNLV | W 99–83; W 94–91; W 81–80^{OT} W 93–91; L 81–90 |
| 1991 | #8 | First Round; Second Round | #9 DePaul #1 Ohio State | W 87–70; L 61–65 |
| 1992 | #7 | First Round; Second Round; Sweet Sixteen | #10 Houston #2 USC #6 Memphis | W 65–60; W 79–78; L 79–83 |
| 1993 | #4 | First Round | #13 Southern | L 78–93 |
| 1996 | #3 | First Round; Second Round; Sweet Sixteen | #14 Austin Peay #11 Boston College #2 Cincinnati | W 90–79; W 103–89; L 70–87 |
| 2001 | #8 | First Round | #9 Saint Joseph's | L 62–66 |
| 2004 | #3 | First Round; Second Round; Sweet Sixteen; Elite Eight; Final Four; National Championship | #14 Northern Iowa #6 Boston College #10 Nevada #4 Kansas #2 Oklahoma State #2 Connecticut | W 65–60; W 57–54; W 72–67; W 79–71; W 67–65; L 73–82 |
| 2005 | #5 | First Round; Second Round | #12 George Washington #4 Louisville | W 80–68; L 54–76 |
| 2007 | #10 | First Round | #7 UNLV | L 63–67 |
| 2010 | #10 | First Round; Second Round | #7 Oklahoma State #2 Ohio State | W 64–59; L 66–75 |
| 2021 | #9 | First Round | #8 Loyola–Chicago | L 60–71 |

=== NIT results ===
The Yellow Jackets have appeared in the National Invitation Tournament (NIT) nine times. Their combined record is 14–10.

| Year | Round | Opponent | Result |
|---|---|---|---|
| 1970 | First Round; Quarterfinals | Duquesne; St. John's | W 78–68; L 55–56 |
| 1971 | First Round; Quarterfinals; Semifinals; Finals | La Salle; Michigan; St. Bonaventure; North Carolina | W 70–67; W 78–70; W 76–71; L 66–84 |
| 1984 | First Round | Virginia Tech | L 74–77 |
| 1994 | First Round | Siena | L 68–76 |
| 1998 | First Round; Second Round; Quarterfinals | Seton Hall; Georgetown; Penn State | W 88–70; W 80–79; L 70–77 |
| 1999 | First Round | Oregon | L 64–67 |
| 2003 | First Round; Second Round; Quarterfinals | Ohio State; Iowa; Texas Tech | W 72–58; W 79–78; L 72–80 |
| 2016 | First Round; Second Round; Quarterfinals | Houston; South Carolina; San Diego State | W 81–62; W 83–66; L 56–72 |
| 2017 | First Round; Second Round; Quarterfinals; Semifinals; Championship | Indiana; Belmont; Ole Miss; Cal State Bakersfield; TCU | W 75–63; W 71–57; W 74–66; W 76–61; L 56–88 |
| 2025 | First Round | Jacksonville State | L 64–81 |

== Players ==
Many notable players have played with the Yellow Jackets. In 1990, Dennis Scott was the Player of the Year at both the National and ACC level and Jarrett Jack was the 2005 Basketball Times All-South player.

A fictional player for the Yellow Jackets is Tech student George P. Burdell, who is listed in team media guides as having earned three letters (1956–58).

=== Basketball Hall of Famers ===
Georgia Tech has one alumnus in the Basketball Hall of Fame, Chris Bosh who played at Tech from 2002–2003.

=== Retired numbers ===
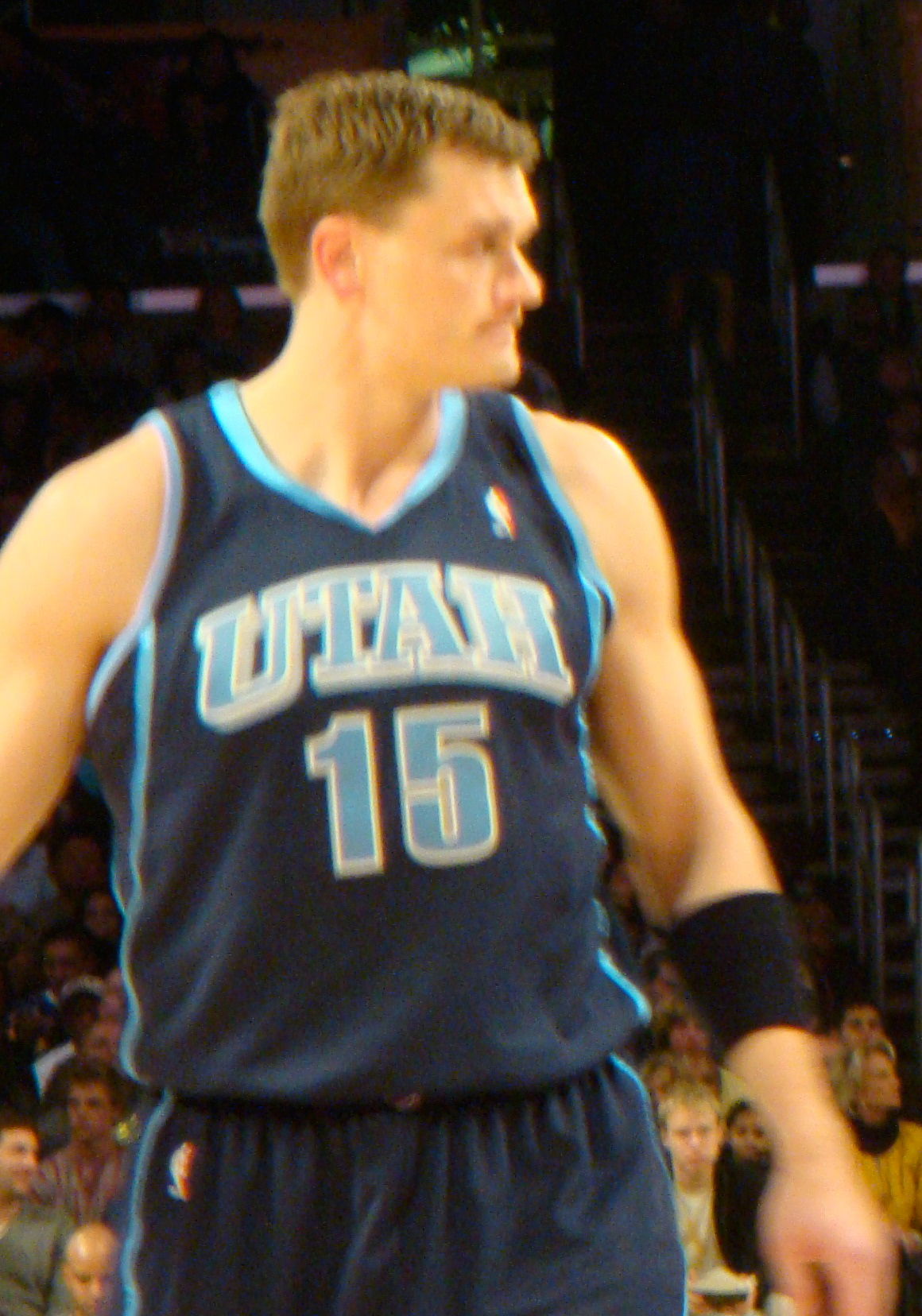
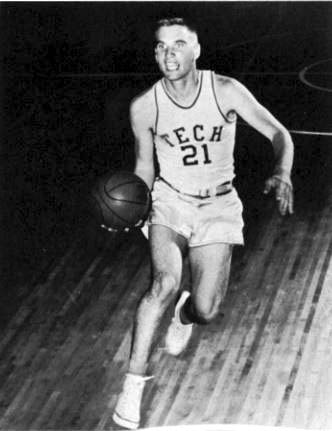
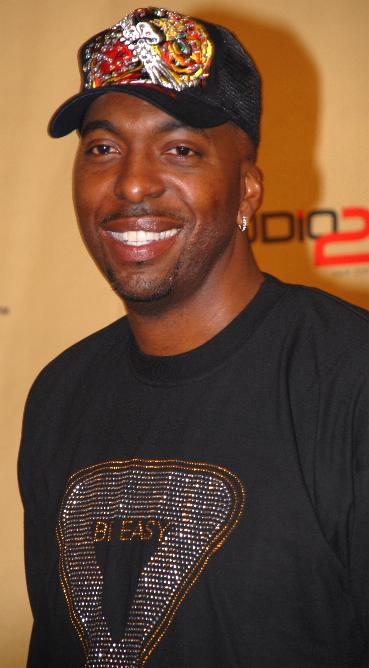
Matt Harpring, Roger Kaiser, and John Salley, whose numbers were retired by Georgia Tech

| No. | Player | Pos. | Tenure | No. ret. | Ref. |
|---|---|---|---|---|---|
| 4 | Dennis Scott | SF | 1987–90 | 2024 | |
| 15 | Matt Harpring | SF | 1994–98 | 1998 | |
| 20 | Tom Hammonds | PF | 1985–89 | | |
| 21 | Roger Kaiser | G | 1958–61 | 1961 | |
| 22 | John Salley | PF | 1982–86 | | |
| 25 | Mark Price | PG | 1982–86 | | |
| 40 | Rich Yunkus | PF | 1968–71 | 1971 | |

=== All-Americans ===
| Player | Year(s) | Team(s) |
|---|---|---|
| Roger Kaiser | 1960 | Consensus Second Team – AP (2nd), USBWA (1st), NABC (2nd), UPI (3rd), Sporting News (2nd) |
| Roger Kaiser | 1961 | Consensus First Team – AP (1st), USBWA (1st), NABC (1st), UPI (1st), NEA (1st), Sporting News (1st), NCAB (1st) |
| Rich Yunkus | 1970 | UPI (3rd) |
| Rich Yunkus | 1971 | AP (3rd) |
| Mark Price | 1984 | UPI (3rd) |
| Mark Price | 1985 | Consensus Second Team – AP (2nd), NABC (2nd), UPI (3rd) |
| Mark Price | 1986 | AP (3rd), NABC (2nd), UPI (3rd) |
| John Salley | 1986 | NABC (3rd) |
| Tom Hammonds | 1989 | NABC (3rd) |
| Dennis Scott | 1990 | Consensus Second Team – AP (2nd), USBWA (2nd), NABC (3rd), UPI (2nd) |
| Kenny Anderson | 1990 | AP (3rd) |
| Kenny Anderson | 1991 | Consensus First Team – AP (1st), USBWA (1st), NABC (1st), UPI (1st) |
| Stephon Marbury | 1996 | AP (3rd), NABC (3rd) |
| Matt Harpring | 1998 | AP (3rd), USBWA (2nd), NABC (2nd) |

=== All-time leaders ===
==== Points ====
| Rank | Player | Years | Points |
|---|---|---|---|
| 1. | Rich Yunkus | 1968–71 | 2,232 |
| 2. | Matt Harpring | 1994–98 | 2,225 |
| 3. | Mark Price | 1982–86 | 2,193 |
| 4. | Dennis Scott | 1987–90 | 2,115 |
| 5. | Tom Hammonds | 1985–89 | 2,081 |
| 6. | Travis Best | 1991–95 | 2,057 |
| 7. | James Forrest | 1991–95 | 1,978 |
| 8. | Brian Oliver | 1986–90 | 1,848 |
| 9. | Duane Ferrell | 1984–88 | 1,818 |
| 10. | Malcolm Mackey | 1989–93 | 1,736 |
| 11. | Marcus Georges-Hunt | 2012–16 | 1,728 |
| 12. | Michael Devoe | 2018–22 | 1,704 |
| 13. | Tony Akins | 1998–02 | 1,658 |
| 14. | Roger Kaiser | 1958–61 | 1,628 |
| 15. | B. J. Elder | 2001–05 | 1,616 |
| 16. | Bruce Dalrymple | 1983–87 | 1,588 |
| 17. | John Salley | 1982–86 | 1,587 |
| 18. | Kenny Anderson | 1989–91 | 1,497 |
| 19. | Jim Wood | 1973–77 | 1,459 |
| 20. | Jose Alvarado | 2017–21 | 1,429 |

==== Rebounds ====
| Rank | Player | Years | Rebounds |
|---|---|---|---|
| 1. | Malcolm Mackey | 1989–93 | 1,205 |
| 2. | Alvin Jones | 1997–01 | 1,075 |
| 3. | Matt Harpring | 1994–98 | 997 |
| 4. | Jim Caldwell | 1962–65 | 993 |
| 5. | Rich Yunkus | 1968–71 | 955 |
| 6. | Tom Hammonds | 1985–89 | 885 |
| 7. | James Forrest | 1991–95 | 846 |
| 8. | Daniel Miller | 2010–14 | 821 |
| 9. | John Salley | 1982–86 | 798 |
| 10. | Ben Lammers | 2014–18 | 774 |
| 11. | Ed Elisma | 1993–97 | 762 |
| 12. | Bruce Dalrymple | 1983–87 | 744 |
| 13. | Jim Wood | 1973–77 | 740 |
| 14. | Gani Lawal | 2007–10 | 712 |
| 15. | Jeremis Smith | 2004–08 | 708 |
| 16. | Lenny Horton | 1976–80 | 704 |
| 17. | Michael Maddox | 1994–98 | 687 |
| 18. | Duane Ferrell | 1984–88 | 680 |
| 19. | Ivano Newbill | 1990–94 | 654 |
| 20. | Luke Schenscher | 2001–05 | 640 |

==== Assists ====
| Rank | Player | Years | Assists |
|---|---|---|---|
| 1. | Drew Barry | 1992–96 | 724 |
| 2. | Travis Best | 1991–95 | 692 |
| 3. | Craig Neal | 1983–88 | 659 |
| 4. | Tony Akins | 1998–02 | 560 |
| 5. | Jarrett Jack | 2002–05 | 543 |
| 6. | Brian Oliver | 1986–90 | 538 |
| 7. | Mark Price | 1982–86 | 510 |
| 8. | Kenny Anderson | 1989–91 | 454 |
| 9. | Bruce Dalrymple | 1983–87 | 446 |
| 10. | Jim Thorne | 1968–71 | 410 |

==== Steals ====
| Rank | Player | Years | Steals |
|---|---|---|---|
| 1. | Mark Price | 1982–86 | 240 |
| 2. | Bruce Dalrymple | 1983–87 | 227 |
| 3. | Jose Alvarado | 2017–21 | 226 |
| 4. | Travis Best | 1991–95 | 217 |
| 5. | Iman Shumpert | 2008–11 | 207 |
| 6. | Drew Berry | 1992–96 | 193 |
| 7. | Jarrett Jack | 2002–05 | 183 |
| 8. | Matt Harpring | 1995–98 | 176 |
| 9. | Tony Aikins | 1998–01 | 173 |
| 10. | Kenny Anderson | 1989–91 | 168 |

==== Blocks ====
| Rank | Player | Years | Blocks |
|---|---|---|---|
| 1. | Alvin Jones | 1997–01 | 425 |
| 2. | Daniel Miller | 2010–14 | 286 |
| 3. | Ben Lammers | 2014–18 | 254 |
| 4. | John Salley | 1982–86 | 243 |
| 5. | Malcolm Mackey | 1989–93 | 199 |
| 6. | Ed Elisma | 1993–97 | 174 |
| 7. | Luke Schenscher | 2001–05 | 157 |
| 8. | Gani Lawal | 2007–10 | 127 |
| 9. | Moses Wright | 2017–21 | 108 |
| 10. | Alade Aminu | 2005–09 | 105 |

== Arena ==
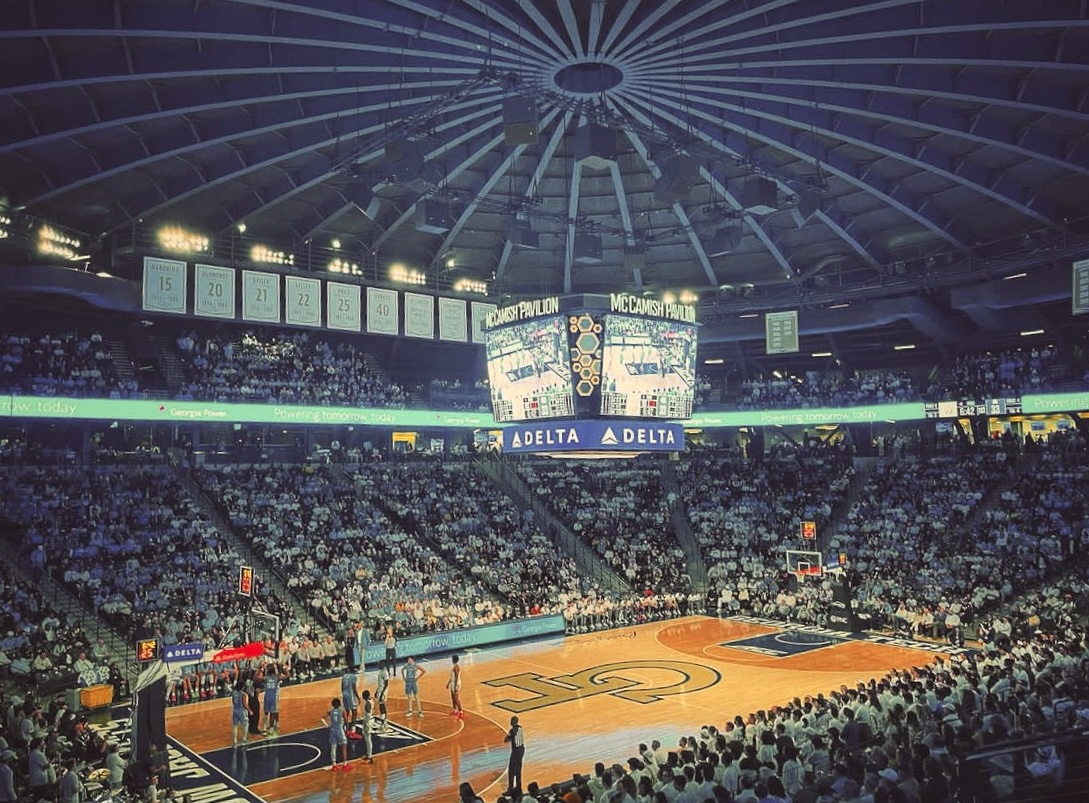
Hank McCamish Pavilion (formerly known as Alexander Memorial Coliseum) has been home to the Yellow Jackets since 1956.

The Hank McCamish Pavilion, rebuilt and renamed from Alexander Memorial Coliseum (also nicknamed "The Thrillerdome") in 2012, is an indoor arena located on Tech's Midtown Atlanta campus. It is the home of the Georgia Tech basketball teams and hosted the Atlanta Hawks of the National Basketball Association from 1968 to 1972 and again from 1997 to 1999. Tech's women's volleyball team occasionally uses the facility as well, primarily for NCAA tournament games and other matches that draw crowds that would overflow the O'Keefe Gymnasium. During the 2011–12 season, the Yellow Jackets split their home schedule between Philips Arena and the Arena at Gwinnett Center in suburban Duluth while McCamish Pavilion was under reconstruction.
