= John Hyder =

American basketball coach (1912–2003)

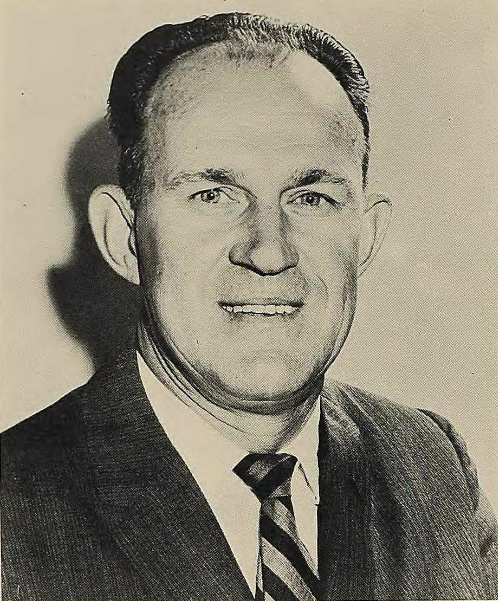

Biographical details
- Born: July 10, 1912; Lula, Georgia, U.S.
- Died: February 9, 2003 (aged 90)

Playing career
- 1933–1937: Georgia Tech

Coaching career (HC unless noted)
- 1946–1951: Georgia Tech (assistant)
- 1951–1973: Georgia Tech

Head coaching record
- Overall: 292–271 (.519)

Accomplishments and honors

Awards
- Georgia Tech Hall of Fame (1980)

John T. "Whack" Hyder (July 10, 1912 – February 9, 2003) was an American college basketball coach. He is the second winningest coach in Georgia Institute of Technology's history with 292 wins. Hyder led the Yellow Jackets to their first NCAA Tournament appearance in 1960 where they advanced to the Elite Eight. In 1971, Georgia Tech reached the National Invitation Tournament championship game.

As a player, Hyder lettered in baseball, basketball, track, and cross country at Georgia Tech. After graduating in 1937 he spent three years playing in the New York Yankees' minor league baseball system. Hyder served in the United States Navy in World War II before returning to Georgia Tech as an assistant men's basketball coach in 1946. In 1951, he was promoted to head coach where he remained until 1973.
