= Atlantic Coast Conference Men's Basketball Rookie of the Year =

ACC Men's Basketball Rookie of the Year
- Awarded for: the most outstanding freshman male basketball player in the Atlantic Coast Conference
- Country: United States
- Presented by: Atlantic Coast Sports Media Association
- First award: 1976
- Currently held by: Cameron Boozer, Duke

The Atlantic Coast Conference (ACC) Men's Basketball Rookie of the Year is an award given to the freshman basketball player in the Atlantic Coast Conference voted by members of the Atlantic Coast Sports Media Association as the most outstanding freshman player.

== Winners ==
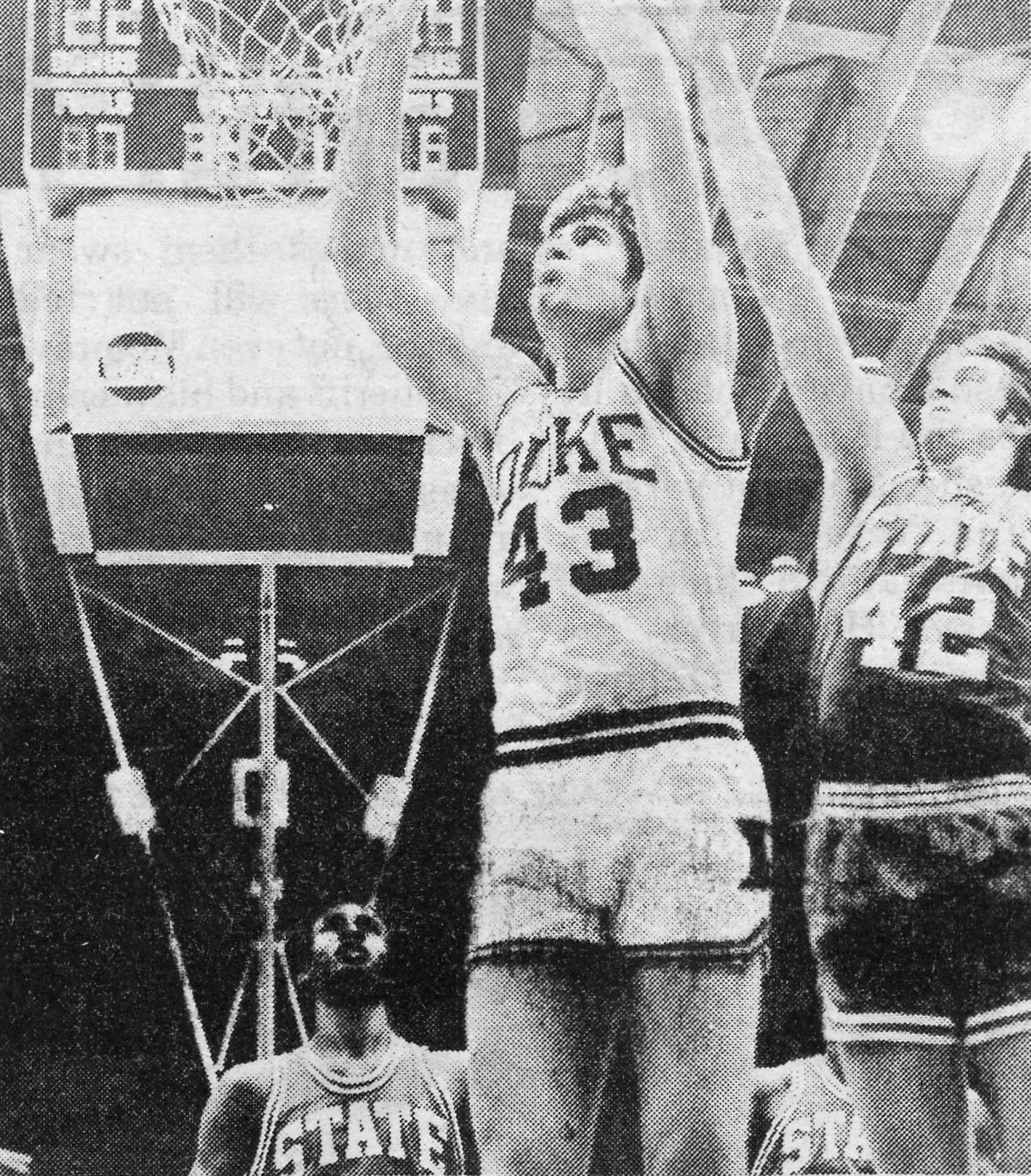
Mike Gminski, Duke, 1977

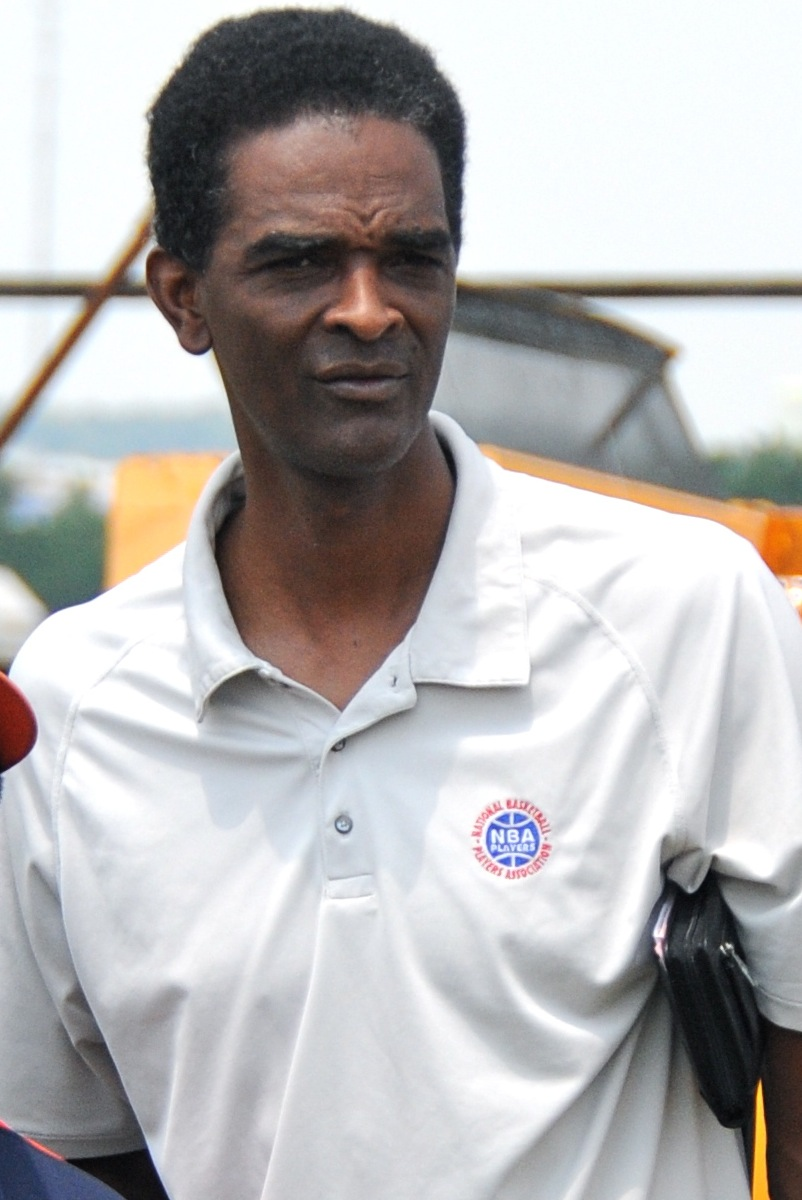
Ralph Sampson, Virginia, 1980

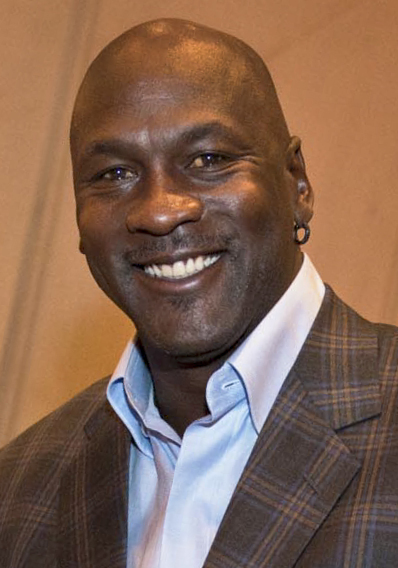
Michael Jordan, North Carolina, 1982

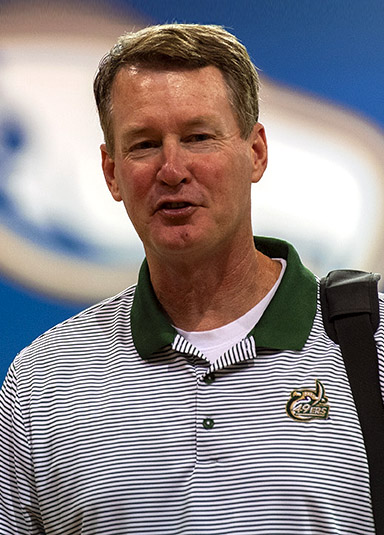
Mark Price, Georgia Tech, 1983

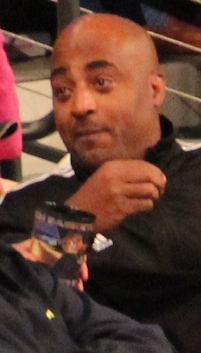
Dennis Scott, Georgia Tech, 1988

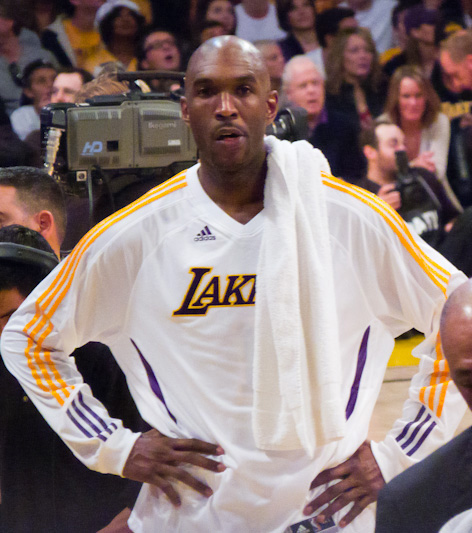
Joe Smith, Maryland, 1994

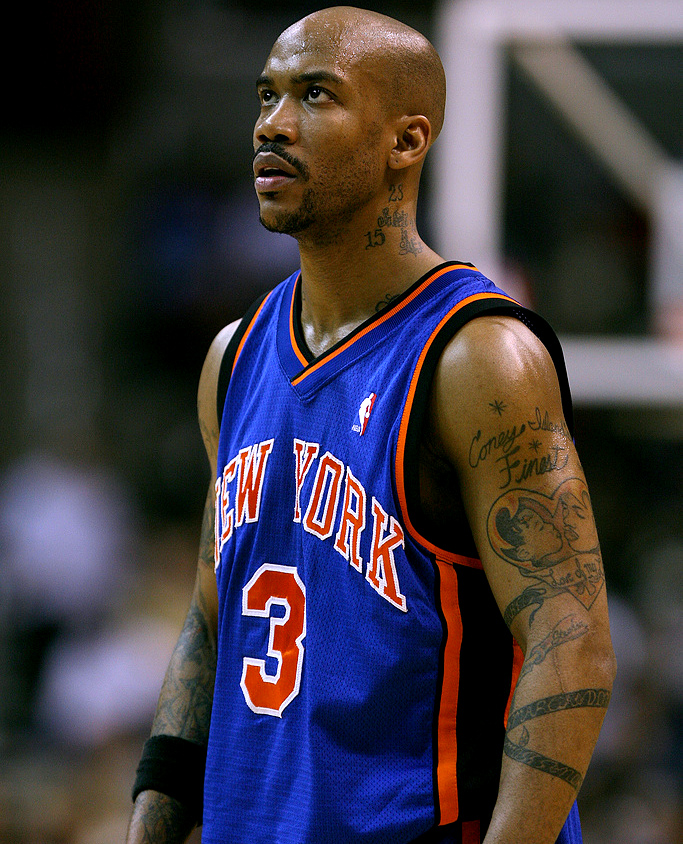
Stephon Marbury, Georgia Tech, 1996

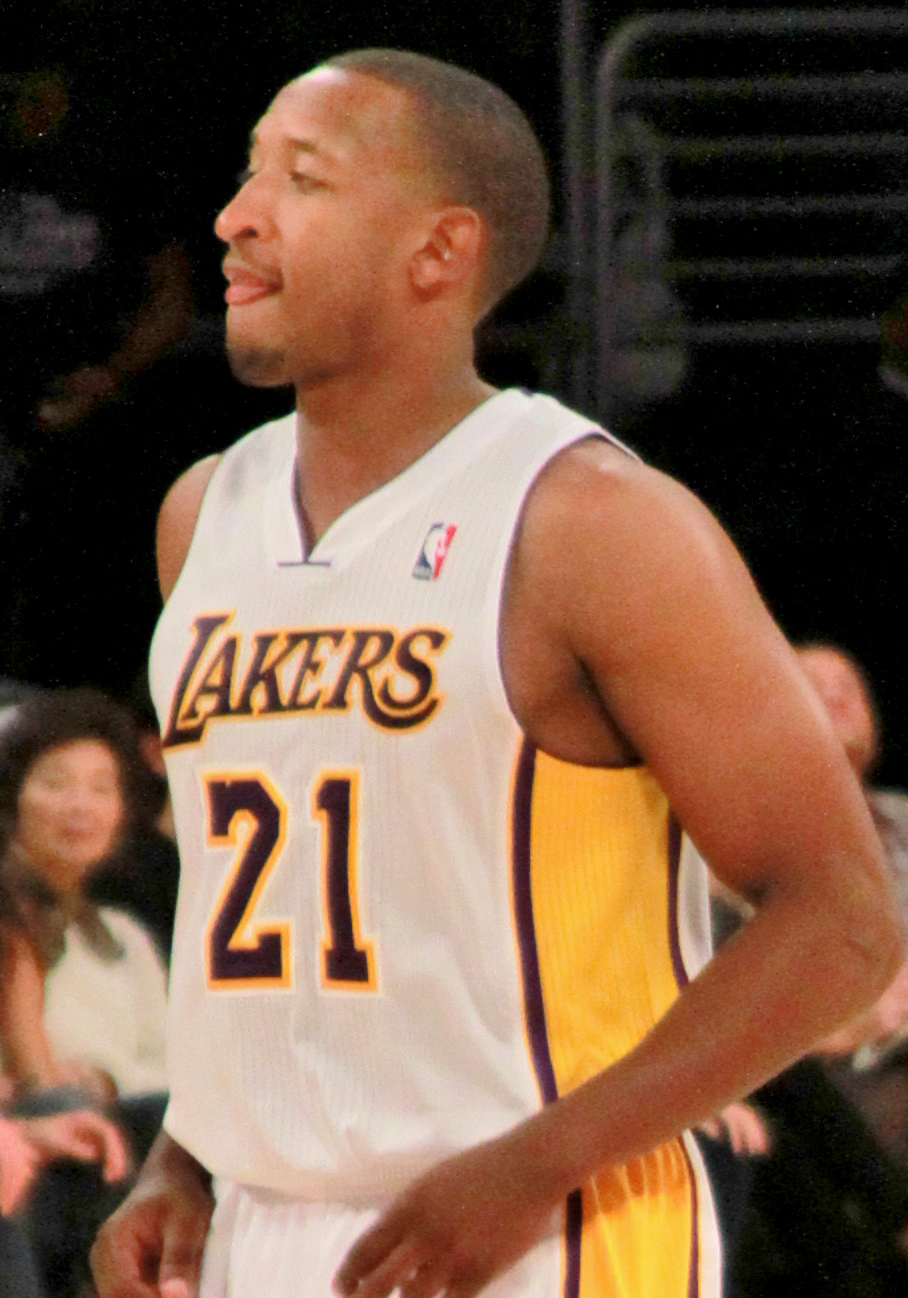
Chris Duhon, Duke, 2001

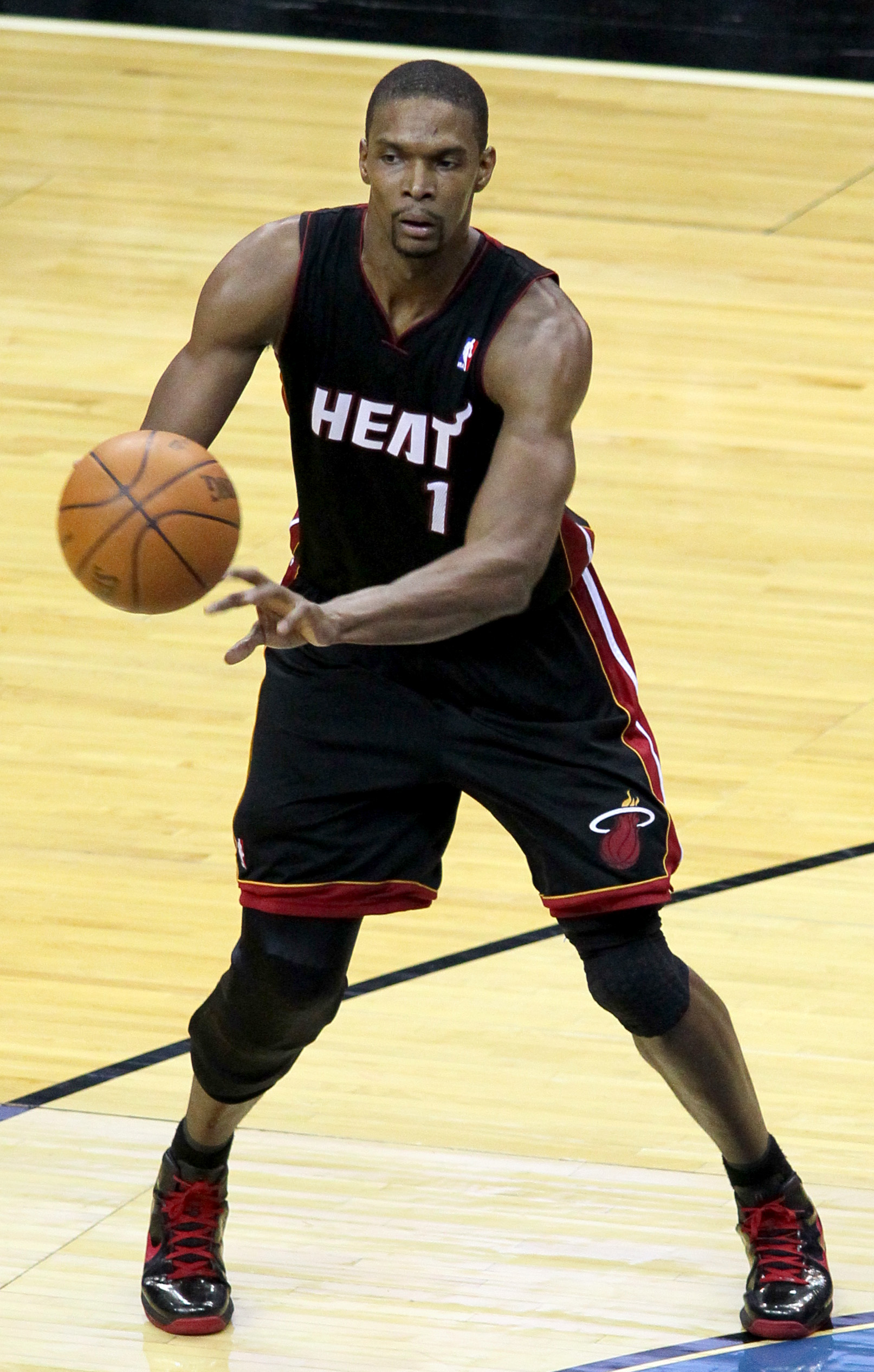
Chris Bosh, Georgia Tech, 2003

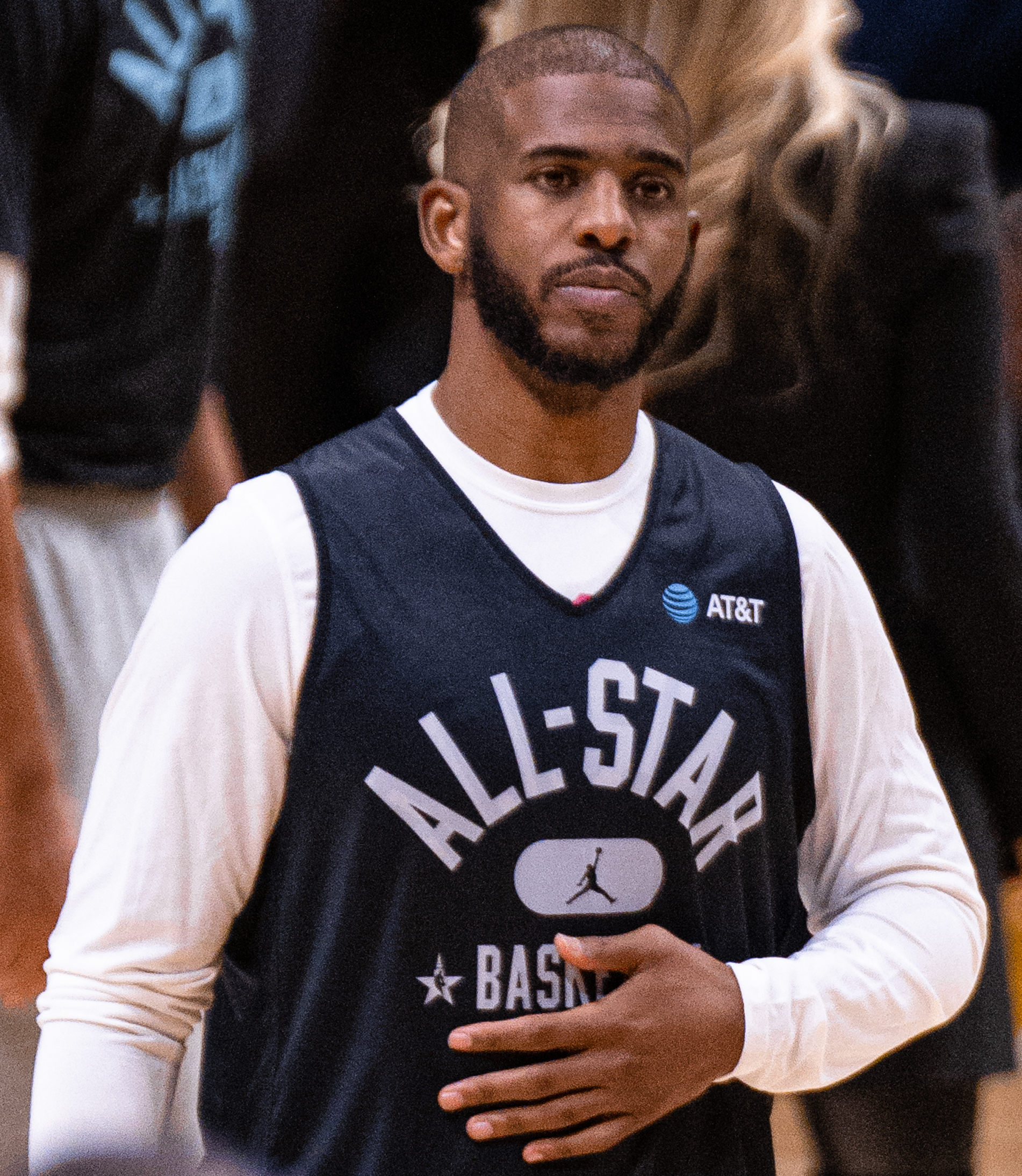
Chris Paul, Wake Forest, 2004

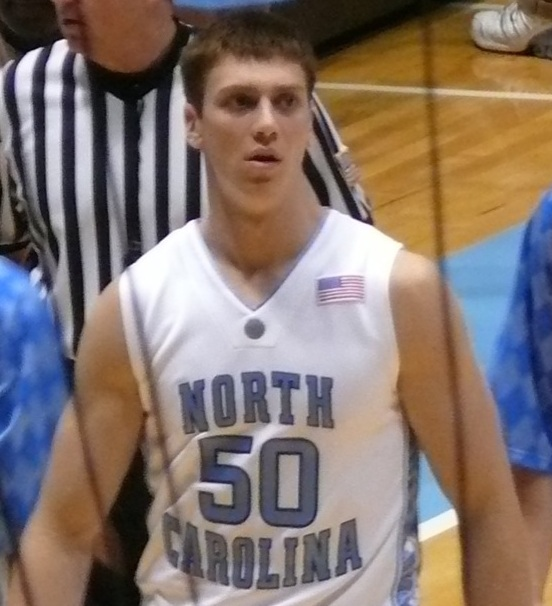
Tyler Hansbrough, North Carolina, 2006

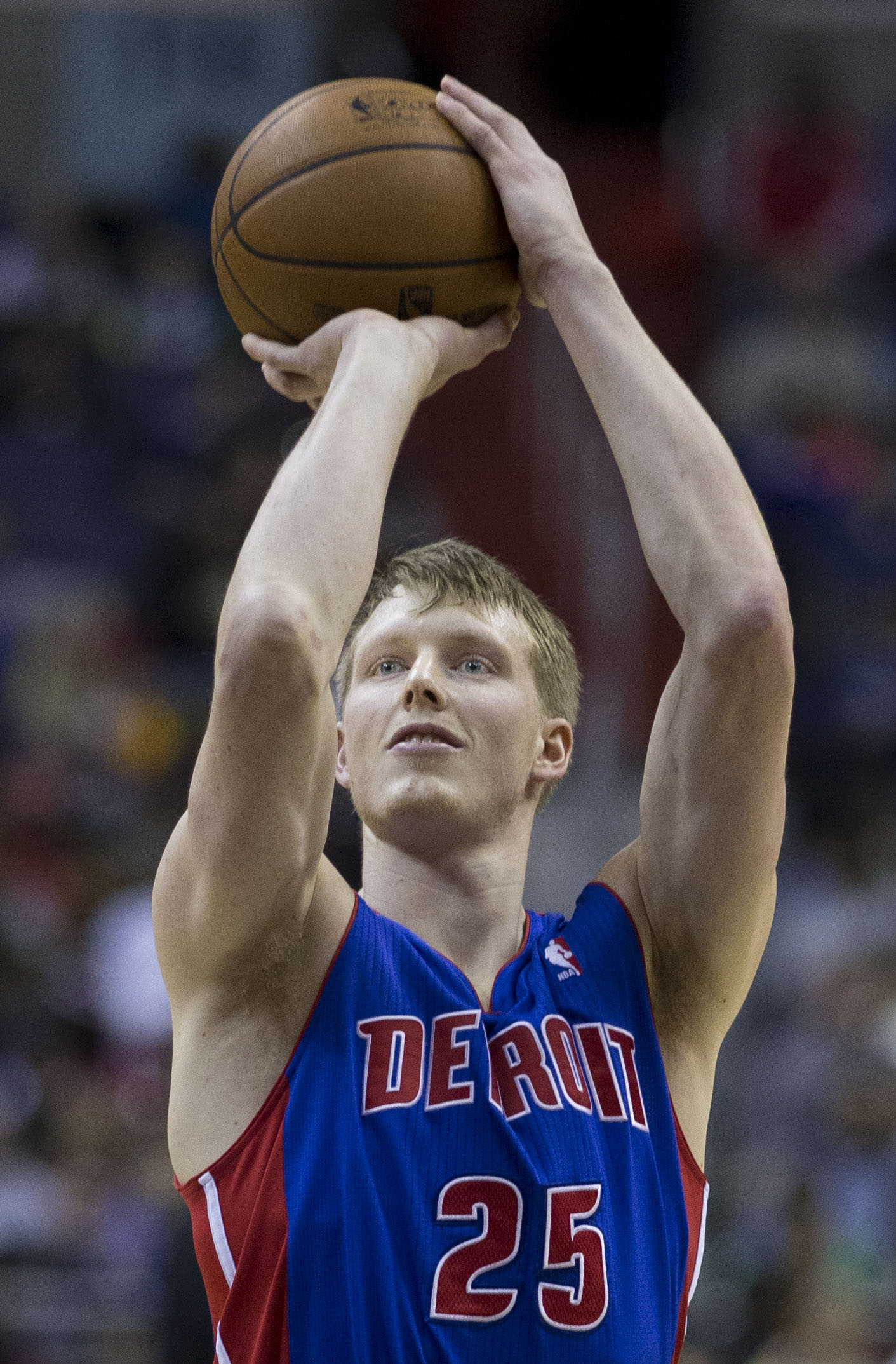
Kyle Singler, Duke, 2008

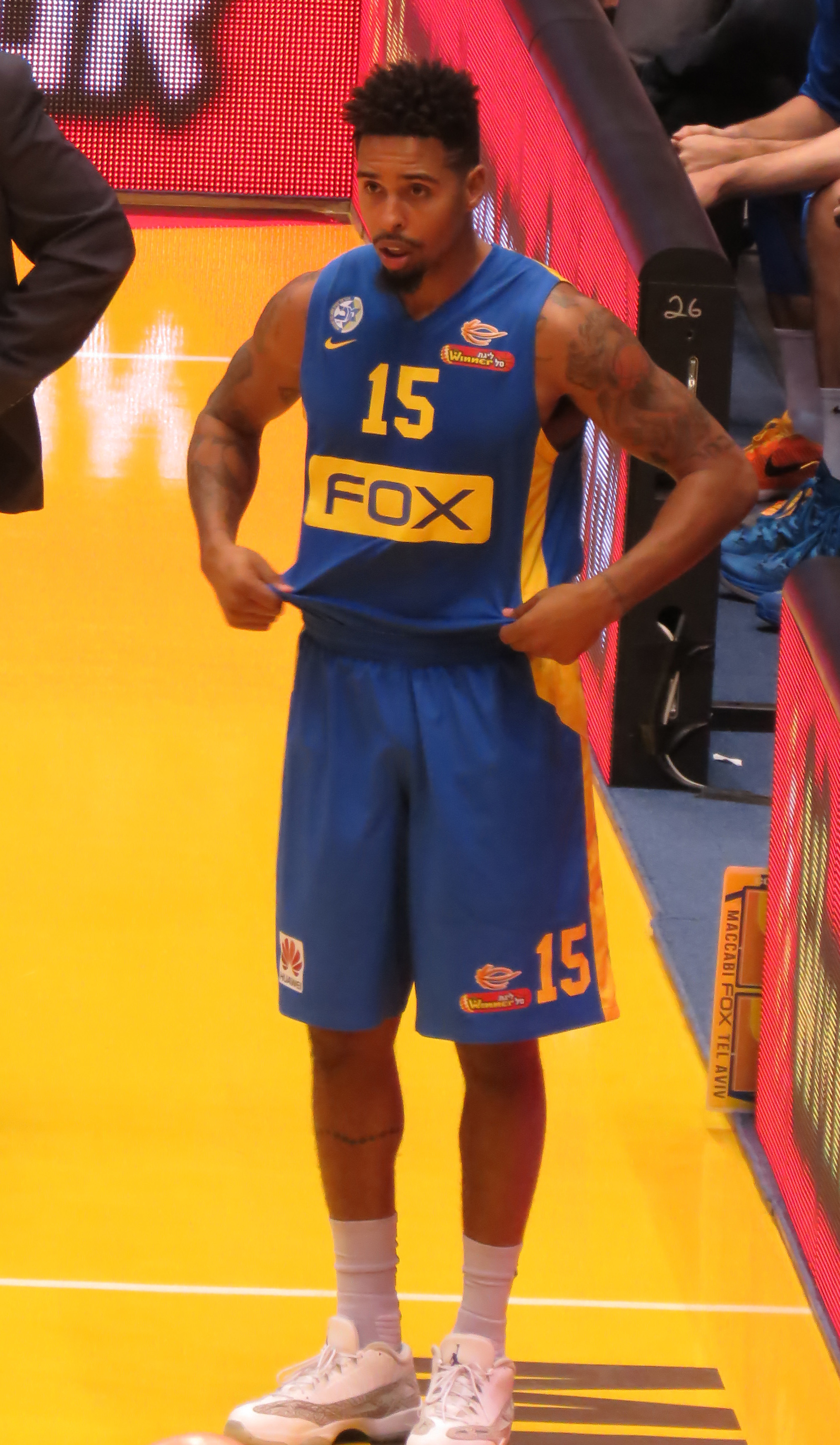
Sylven Landesberg, Virginia, 2009

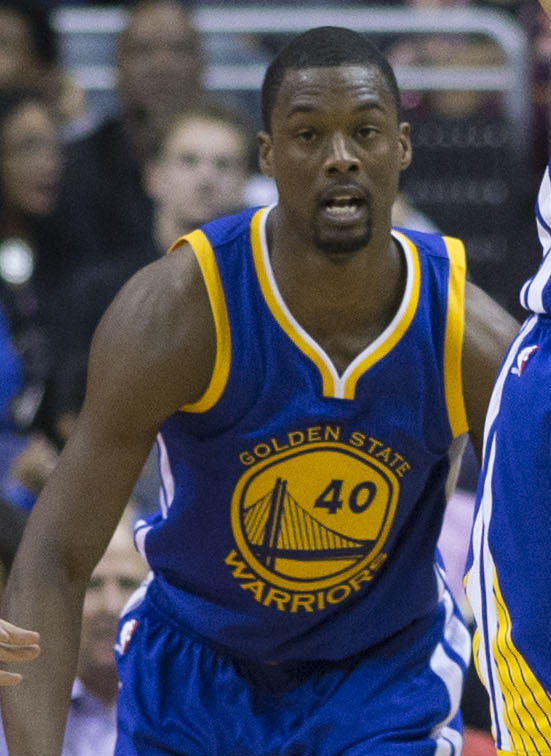
Harrison Barnes, North Carolina, 2011

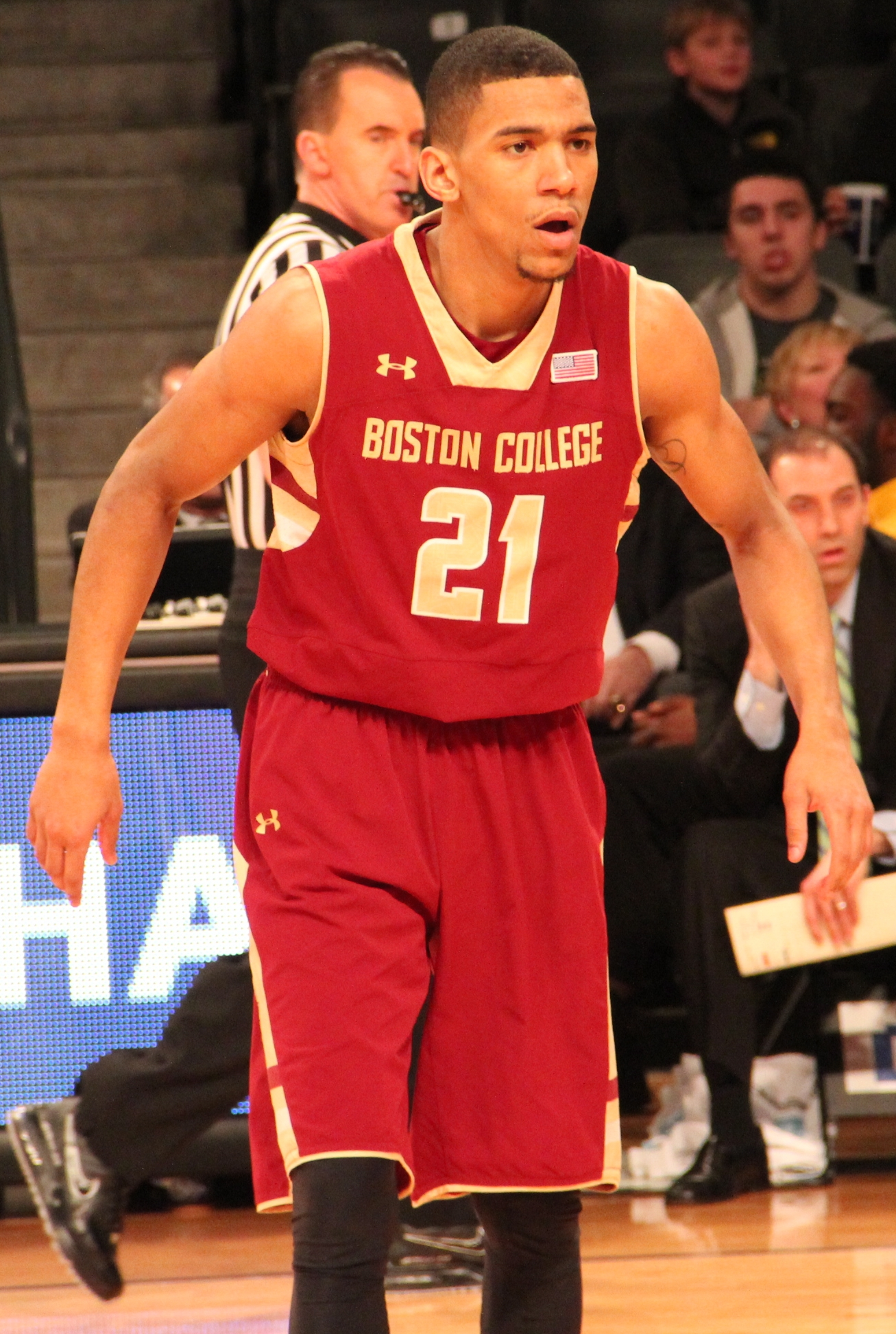
Olivier Hanlan, Boston College, 2013

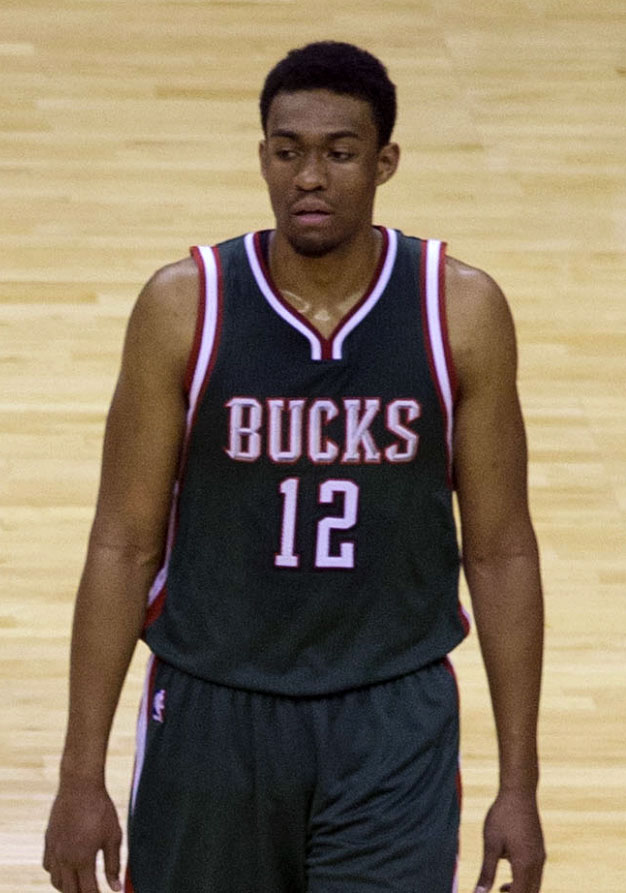
Jabari Parker, Duke, 2014

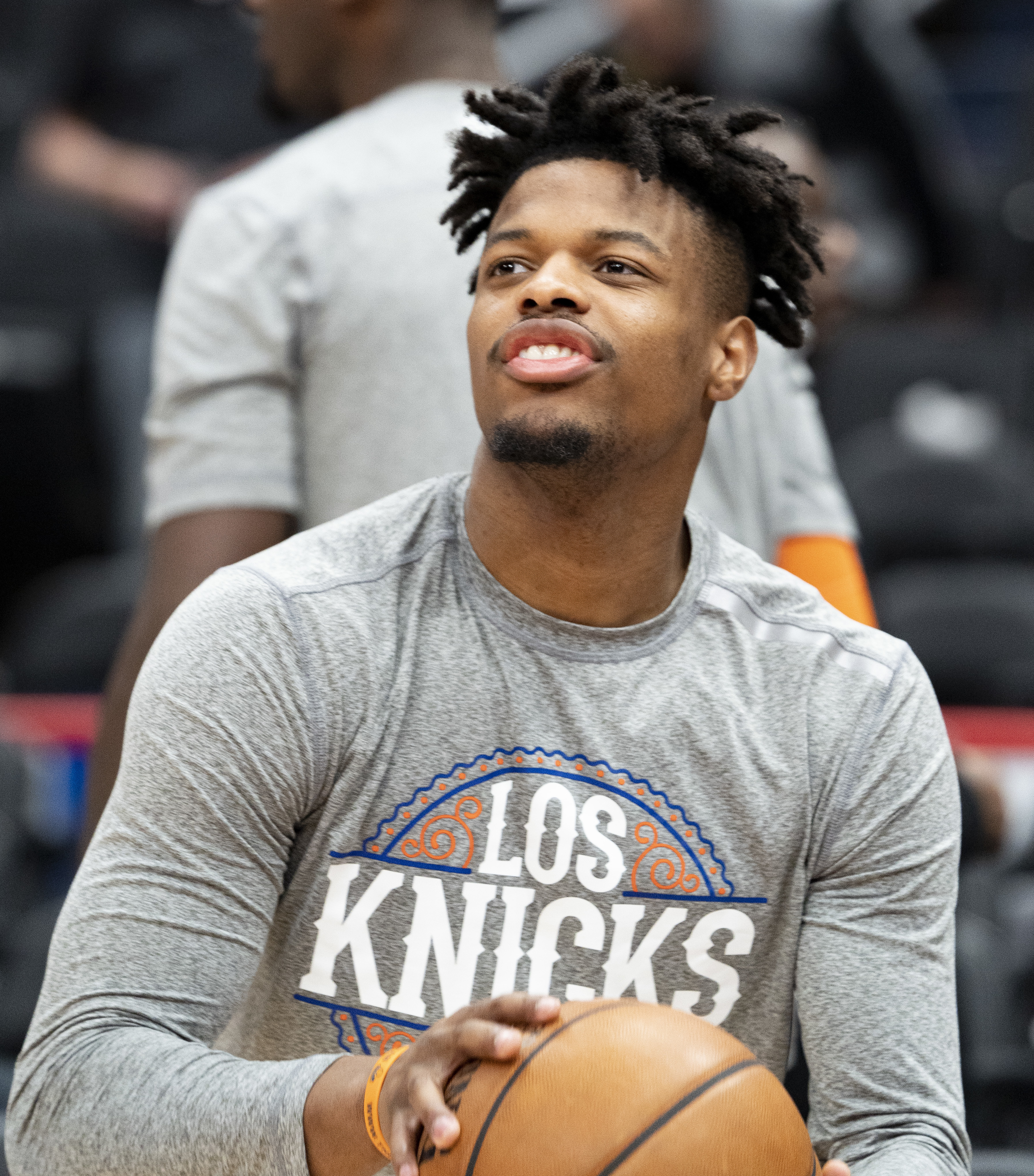
Dennis Smith Jr., NC State, 2017

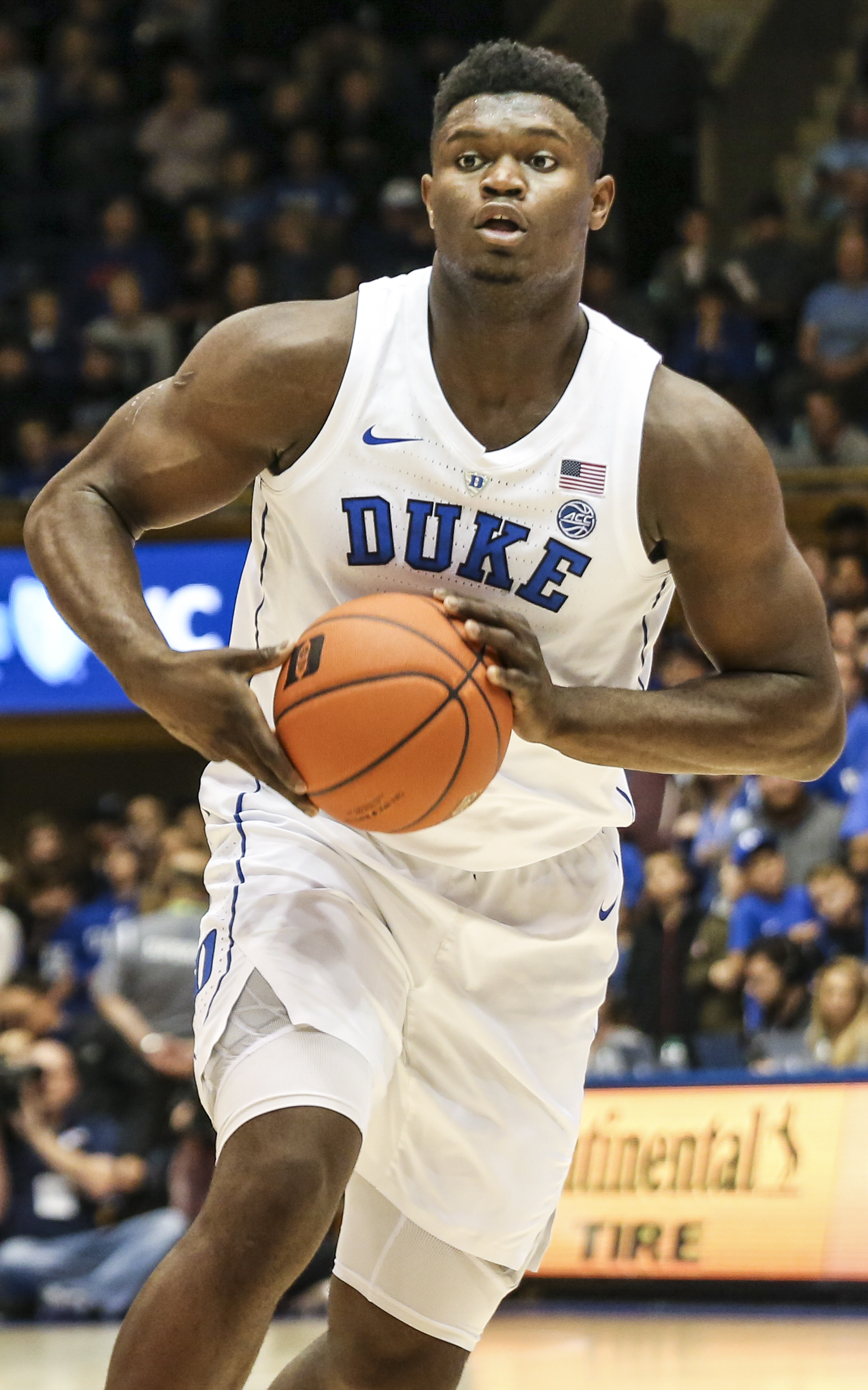
Zion Williamson, Duke, 2019

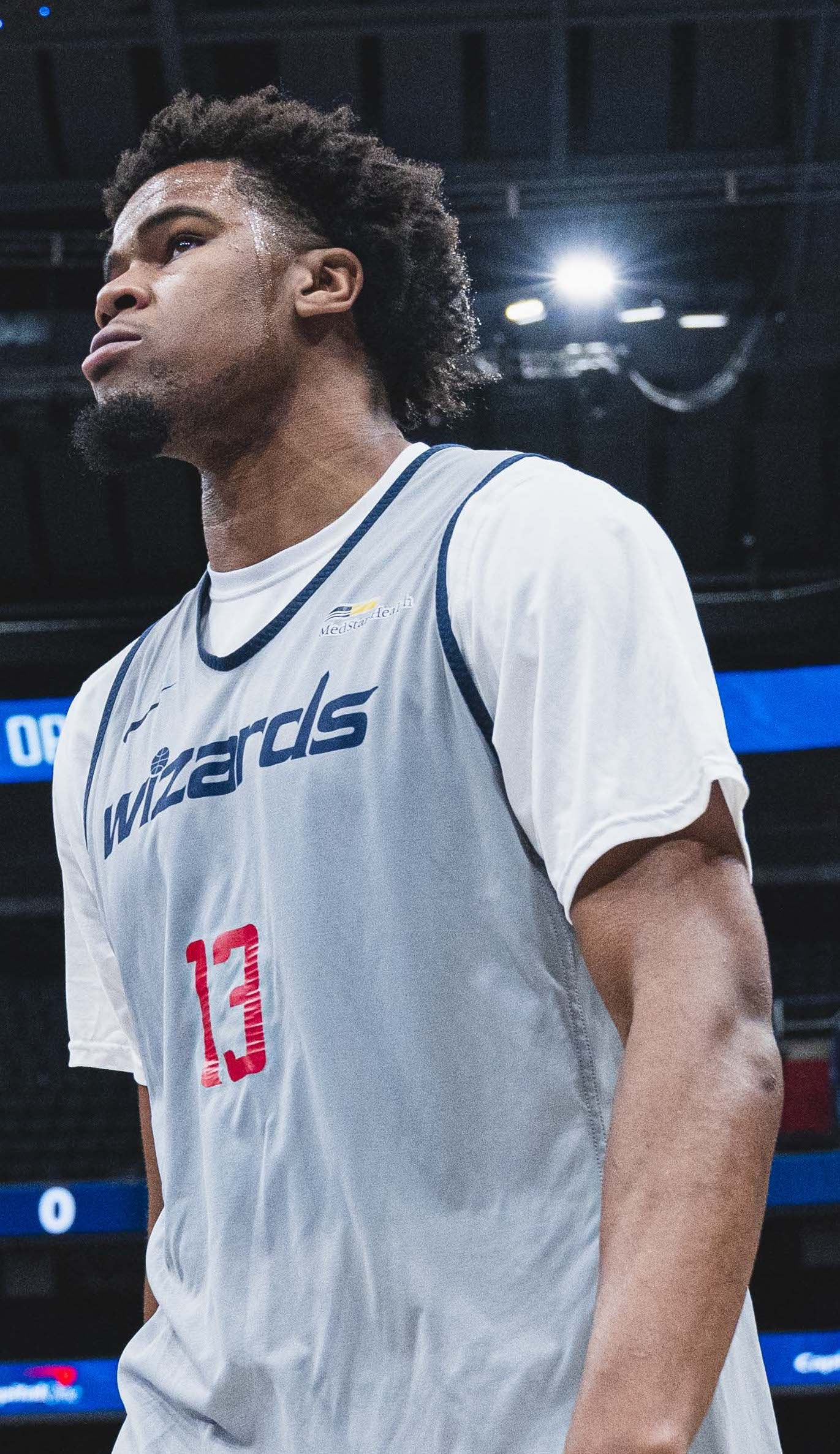
Vernon Carey Jr., Duke, 2020

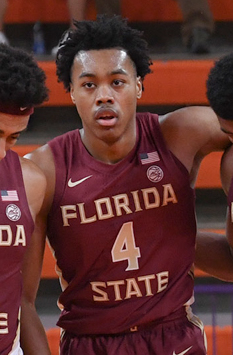
Scottie Barnes, Florida State, 2021

| Year | Player | School |
|---|---|---|
| 1976 | Jim Spanarkel | Duke |
| 1977 | Mike Gminski | Duke |
| 1977 | Hawkeye Whitney | NC State |
| 1978 | Gene Banks | Duke |
| 1979 | Buck Williams | Maryland |
| 1980 | Ralph Sampson | Virginia |
| 1981 | Sam Perkins | North Carolina |
| 1982 | Michael Jordan | North Carolina |
| 1983 | Mark Price | Georgia Tech |
| 1984 | Bruce Dalrymple | Georgia Tech |
| 1985 | Duane Ferrell | Georgia Tech |
| 1986 | Tom Hammonds | Georgia Tech |
| 1987 | J. R. Reid | North Carolina |
| 1988 | Dennis Scott | Georgia Tech |
| 1989 | Bryant Stith | Virginia |
| 1990 | Kenny Anderson | Georgia Tech |
| 1991 | Rodney Rogers | Wake Forest |
| 1992 | Bob Sura | Florida State |
| 1993 | Martice Moore | Georgia Tech |
| 1994 | Joe Smith | Maryland |
| 1995 | Greg Buckner | Clemson |
| 1996 | Stephon Marbury | Georgia Tech |
| 1997 | Ed Cota | North Carolina |
| 1998 | Robert O'Kelley | Wake Forest |
| 1999 | Chris Williams | Virginia |
| 2000 | Joseph Forte | North Carolina |
| 2001 | Chris Duhon | Duke |
| 2002 | Ed Nelson | Georgia Tech |
| 2003 | Chris Bosh | Georgia Tech |
| 2004 | Chris Paul | Wake Forest |
| 2005 | Marvin Williams | North Carolina |
| 2006 | Tyler Hansbrough | North Carolina |
| 2007 | Brandan Wright | North Carolina |
| 2008 | Kyle Singler | Duke |
| 2009 | Sylven Landesberg | Virginia |
| 2010 | Derrick Favors | Georgia Tech |
| 2011 | Harrison Barnes | North Carolina |
| 2012 | Austin Rivers | Duke |
| 2013 | Olivier Hanlan | Boston College |
| 2014 | Jabari Parker | Duke |
| 2015 | Jahlil Okafor | Duke |
| 2016 | Brandon Ingram | Duke |
| 2017 | Dennis Smith Jr. | NC State |
| 2018 | Marvin Bagley III | Duke |
| 2019 | Zion Williamson | Duke |
| 2020 | Vernon Carey Jr. | Duke |
| 2021 | Scottie Barnes | Florida State |
| 2022 | Paolo Banchero | Duke |
| 2023 | Kyle Filipowski | Duke |
| 2024 | Markus Burton | Notre Dame |
| 2025 | Cooper Flagg | Duke |
| 2026 | Cameron Boozer | Duke |

== Winners by school ==
| School (year joined) | Winners | Years |
|---|---|---|
| Duke (1953) | 16 | 1976, 1977, 1978, 2001, 2008, 2012, 2014, 2015, 2016, 2018, 2019, 2020, 2022, 2023, 2025, 2026 |
| Georgia Tech (1978) | 11 | 1983, 1984, 1985, 1986, 1988, 1990, 1993, 1996, 2002, 2003, 2010 |
| North Carolina (1953) | 9 | 1981, 1982, 1987, 1997, 2000, 2005, 2006, 2007, 2011 |
| Virginia (1953) | 4 | 1980, 1989, 1999, 2009 |
| Wake Forest (1953) | 3 | 1991, 1998, 2004 |
| NC State (1953) | 2 | 1977, 2017 |
| Maryland (1953) (Note: Maryland left the ACC for the Big Ten Conference after the 2013–14 season.) | 2 | 1979, 1994 |
| Boston College (2005) | 1 | 2013 |
| Clemson (1953) | 1 | 1995 |
| Florida State (1991) | 2 | 1992, 2021 |
| Notre Dame (2013) | 1 | 2024 |
| Miami (2004) | 0 | — |
| Pittsburgh (2013) | 0 | — |
| South Carolina (1953) (Note: South Carolina left the ACC after the 1970–71 season. It is now a member of the Southeastern Conference.) | 0 | — |
| Syracuse (2013) | 0 | — |
| Virginia Tech (2004) | 0 | — |

== See also ==
- Atlantic Coast Conference Men's Basketball Player of the Year
- List of All-Atlantic Coast Conference men's basketball teams
