= 1905–06 Nashville Garnet and Blue men's basketball team =

American college basketball season

1905–06 Nashville Garnet and Blue men's basketball
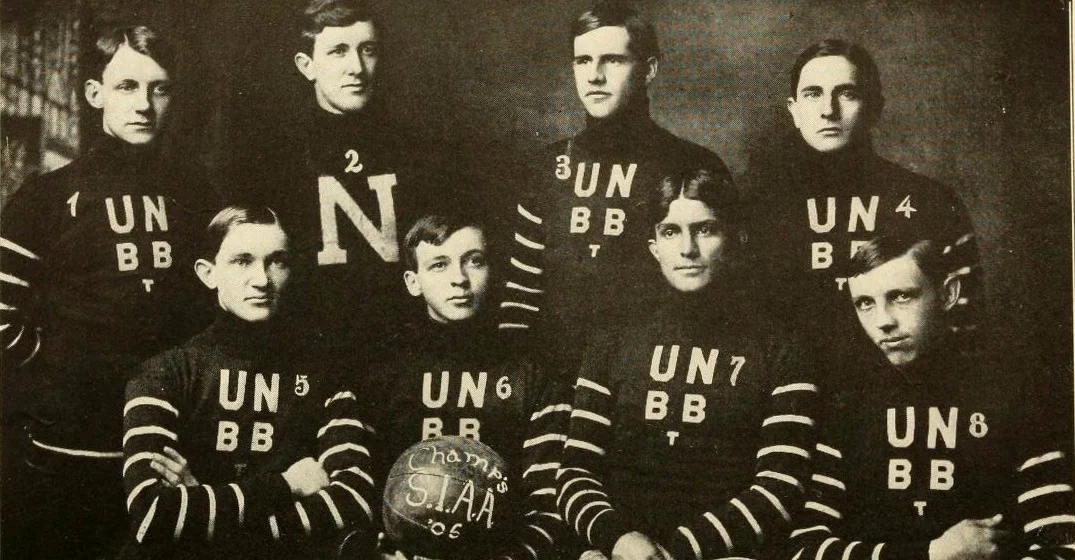

SIAA champion
- Conference: Southern Intercollegiate Athletic Association
- Record: 9–0 (2–0 SIAA)
- Head coach: Elgin
- Captain: King

The 1905–06 Nashville Garnet and Blue men's basketball team represented the University of Nashville during the 1905–06 college basketball season. The team posted a 9–0 record and claimed the Southern Intercollegiate Athletic Association championship.

Basketball was invented by James Naismith in 1891. It seemed to take off in the South in 1906, when Yale's basketball team traveled throughout the South.
