= San Diego State Aztecs men's basketball statistical leaders =

The San Diego State Aztecs men's basketball statistical leaders are individual statistical leaders of the San Diego State Aztecs men's basketball program in various categories, including points, three-pointers, assists, blocks, rebounds, and steals. Within those areas, the lists identify single-game, single-season, and career leaders. The Aztecs represent San Diego State University in NCAA Division I as a member of the Pac-12 Conference.

San Diego State began competing in intercollegiate basketball in 1921. However, the school's record book does not generally list records from before the 1950s, as records from before this period are often incomplete and inconsistent. Since scoring was much lower in this era, and teams played much fewer games during a typical season, it is likely that few or no players from this era would appear on these lists anyway.

The NCAA did not officially record assists as a stat until the 1983–84 season, and blocks and steals until the 1985–86 season, but San Diego State's record books includes players in these stats before these seasons. These lists are updated through the end of the 2021–22 season.

== Scoring ==
Career
Rk	Player	Points	Seasons
1	Brandon Heath	2,189	2003–04 2004–05 2005–06 2006–07
2	Michael Cage	1,846	1980–81 1981–82 1982–83 1983–84
3	Anthony Watson	1,735	1982–83 1983–84 1984–85 1985–86
4	Chase Tapley	1,526	2009–10 2010–11 2011–12 2012–13
5	Tony Pinkins	1,475	1954–55 1955–56 1956–57
6	Matt Mitchell	1,471	2017–18 2018–19 2019–20 2020–21
7	Trey Kell	1,403	2014–15 2015–16 2016–17 2017–18
8	Winston Shepard	1,401	2012–13 2013–14 2014–15 2015–16
9	Jeremy Hemsley	1,392	2015–16 2016–17 2017–18 2018–19
10	Bob Brady	1,389	1951–52 1952–53 1953–54

Season
Rk	Player	Points	Season
1	Jaedon LeDee	772	2023–24
2	Michael Cage	686	1983–84
3	Brandon Heath	637	2006–07
4	Xavier Thames	633	2013–14
5	Anthony Watson	630	1985–86
6	Brandon Heath	607	2005–06
7	Bob Brady	585	1952–53
8	Malachi Flynn	564	2019–20
9	Jamaal Franklin	560	2012–13
10	Randy Holcomb	558	2001–02

Single game
Rk	Player	Points	Season	Opponent
1	Anthony Watson	54	1985–86	USIU
2	Kim Goetz	44	1978–79	Utah
3	Kim Goetz	42	1978–79	Colorado State
4	Eddie Morris	41	1979–80	UNLV
5	Michael Cage	40	1983–84	Wyoming
	Will Connelly	40	1974–75	Purdue
	Von Jacobsen	40	1968–69	Chapman
8	Steve Copp	39	1973–74	Kansas State
9	Kim Goetz	38	1978–79	Brigham Young
10	Brandon Heath	37	2004–05	UNLV
	Shawn Jamison	37	1989–90	USIU
	Michael Cage	37	1983–84	Texas

== Rebounds ==
Career
Rk	Player	Rebounds	Seasons
1	Michael Cage	1,317	1980–81 1981–82 1982–83 1983–84
2	Al Skalecky	1,090	1965–66 1966–67 1967–68
3	Nathan Mensah	899	2018–19 2019–20 2020–21 2021–22 2022–23
4	Marcus Slaughter	775	2003–04 2004–05 2005–06
5	Larry Meek	764	1962–63 1963–64 1964–65
6	Steve Copp	737	1972–73 1973–74 1974–75 1975–76
7	Leonard Allen	724	1981–82 1982–83 1983–84 1984–85
8	Kawhi Leonard	716	2009–10 2010–11
9	Joel Kramer	711	1973–74 1975–76 1976–77 1977–78
10	Winston Shepard	708	2012–13 2013–14 2014–15 2015–16

Season
Rk	Player	Rebounds	Season
1	Al Skalecky	394	1966–67
2	Kawhi Leonard	380	2010–11
3	Al Skalecky	356	1965–66
4	Michael Cage	355	1980–81
5	Michael Cage	354	1982–83
6	Michael Cage	352	1983–84
7	Chris McMurray	350	1971–72
8	Tony Pinkins	346	1955–56
9	Josh Davis	342	2013–14
10	Al Skalecky	340	1967–68

Single game
Rk	Player	Rebounds	Season	Opponent
1	Michael Cage	26	1980–81	LaSalle
2	Al Skalecky	25	1965–66	CSUN
3	Steve Malovic	23	1978–79	New Mexico
	Chris McMurray	23	1971–72	Chapman
5	Al Skalecky	22	1967–68	CSUN
	Al Skalecky	22	1965–66	Cal Poly
7	Kawhi Leonard	21	2009–10	UNLV
	Michael Cage	21	1983–84	Wyoming
	Michael Cage	21	1982–83	Air Force
	Larry Jones	21	1971–72	Fresno State
	Al Skalecky	21	1967–68	UC Irvine

== Assists ==
Career
Rk	Player	Assists	Seasons
1	Tony Gwynn	590	1977–78 1978–79 1979–80 1980–81
2	Richie Williams	479	2005–06 2006–07 2007–08 2008–09
3	Chad Nelson	412	1993–94 1994–95 1995–96 1996–97
4	Brandon Heath	394	2003–04 2004–05 2005–06 2006–07
5	Mark Delsman	376	1973–74 1974–75 1975–76 1976–77
6	Anthony Watson	356	1982–83 1983–84 1984–85 1985–86
7	Keith Smith	349	1981–82 1982–83
8	D.J. Gay	344	2007–08 2008–09 2009–10 2010–11
9	Deandre Moore	339	2000–01 2001–02 2002–03
10	Lamont Butler	338	2020–21 2021–22 2022–23 2023–24

Season
Rk	Player	Assists	Season
1	Tony Gwynn	221	1979–80
2	Keith Smith	212	1981–82
3	Dean Decker	176	1977–78
4	Wesley Stokes	175	2003–04
5	Creon Dorsey	171	1984–85
6	Tony Gwynn	164	1980–81
7	Ray Leary	163	1975–76
	Malachi Flynn	163	2019–20
9	Tony Gwynn	153	1978–79
10	Richie Williams	151	2006–07

Single game
Rk	Player	Assists	Season	Opponent
1	Tony Gwynn	18	1979–80	UNLV
	Eric Martensen	18	1968–69	Chapman
3	Tony Gwynn	16	1980–81	New Mexico
4	Tony Gwynn	14	1979–80	New Mexico
	Dean Decker	14	1976–77	UNLV
6	Creon Dorsey	13	1984–85	Long Beach State
	Andre Ross	13	1983–84	Oral Roberts
	Keith Smith	13	1981–82	UC Irvine
	Keith Smith	13	1981–82	Colorado State
	Tony Gwynn	13	1979–80	Hawai’i
	Tony Gwynn	13	1978–79	Brigham Young
	Howard Avery	13	1978–79	Idaho State
	Dean Decker	13	1977–78	UC Irvine
	Mark Delsman	13	1976–77	UNLV

== Steals ==
Career
Rk	Player	Steals	Seasons
1	Richie Williams	246	2005–06 2006–07 2007–08 2008–09
2	Brandon Heath	217	2003–04 2004–05 2005–06 2006–07
3	Anthony Watson	192	1982–83 1983–84 1984–85 1985–86
4	Chase Tapley	187	2009–10 2010–11 2011–12 2012–13
5	Lamont Butler	183	2020–21 2021–22 2022–23 2023–24
6	Chad Nelson	175	1993–94 1994–95 1995–96 1996–97
7	Miles Byrd	156	2022–23 2023–24 2024–25 2025–26
8	Billy White	149	2007–08 2008–09 2009–10 2010–11
9	Tony Gwynn	141	1977–78 1978–79 1979–80 1980–81
10	Kyle Spain	137	2005–06 2006–07 2007–08 2008–09

Season
Rk	Player	Steals	Season
1	Richie Williams	77	2008–09
2	Anthony Watson	74	1984–85
3	Richie Williams	69	2006–07
4	Matt Watts	65	1998–99
	Michael Best	65	1989–90
6	Brandon Heath	64	2006–07
	Miles Byrd	64	2024–25
8	Miles Byrd	63	2025–26
	Brandon Heath	63	2004–05
	Raymond King	63	1995–96
	Creon Dorsey	63	1984–85

Single game
Rk	Player	Steals	Season	Opponent
1	Tracy Dildy	9	1985–86	U.S. International

== Blocks ==
Career
Rk	Player	Blocks	Seasons
1	Skylar Spencer	303	2012–13 2013–14 2014–15 2015–16
2	Nathan Mensah	236	2018–19 2019–20 2020–21 2021–22 2022–23
3	Leonard Allen	214	1981–82 1982–83 1983–84 1984–85
4	Malcolm Thomas	127	2009–10 2010–11
5	Michael Cage	118	1980–81 1981–82 1982–83 1983–84
6	Joe McNaull	114	1990–91 1991–92 1992–93
7	Malik Pope	113	2014–15 2015–16 2016–17 2017–18
8	Aerick Sanders	105	2000–01 2001–02 2002–03 2003–04
	Magoon Gwath	105	2024–25 2025–26
10	Billy White	102	2007–08 2008–09 2009–10 2010–11

Season
Rk	Player	Blocks	Season
1	Skylar Spencer	91	2014–15
2	Skylar Spencer	89	2013–14
3	Leonard Allen	85	1984–85
4	Malcolm Thomas	75	2010–11
5	Skylar Spencer	72	2015–16
6	Nathan Mensah	71	2021–22
7	Magoon Gwath	68	2024–25
8	Nathan Mensah	65	2022–23
9	Valentine Izundu	53	2016–17
10	Malcolm Thomas	52	2009–10

Single game
Rk	Player	Blocks	Season	Opponent
1	Skylar Spencer	7	2015–16	West Virginia
	Marty Dow	7	1990–91	U.S. International
	Leonard Allen	7	1981–82	Cal State LA
