= Richard Williams =

Richard Williams may refer to:

== Entertainment ==
- Richard Williams (animator) (1933–2019), Canadian-British animator
- Richard Williams (theatre director), theatre director, producer and teacher
- Treat Williams (1951–2023), American actor and children's author
- Dick Anthony Williams (1934–2012), American actor
- Richard Bebb (Richard Bebb Williams, 1927–2006), English actor

== Military ==
- Richard Williams (Royal Marines officer) (1764–1839), British military officer
- Richard Williams (RAAF officer) (1890–1980), Australian aviator

== Music ==
- Richard Williams (conductor) (1923–2007), Welsh conductor
- Richard Williams (musician) (1931–1985), American jazz trumpeter
- Richard Williams, drummer for the Passions
- Dick Williams (singer) (1926–2018), American singer
- Rich Williams (born 1950), sometimes credited as Richard Williams, American guitarist for Kansas

== Politics ==
- Richard Williams (alias Cromwell) (c. 1510–1544), Welsh soldier and courtier
- Richard Williams (congressman) (1836–1914), American politician from Oregon
- Richard Williams (died 1579) (before 1535–1579), English politician for Oxford
- Richard Williams (died 1601) (before 1560–1601), MP for New Romney
- Richard Williams (died 1692) (c. 1654–1692), MP for Radnorshire, for Breconshire and for New Radnor Boroughs
- Richard Williams (MP for Flint) (c. 1699–1759), Welsh politician for Flint
- Richard Williams (of Rhosygeido) (before 1570–1622), Welsh politician from Anglesey
- Richard G. Williams (1830–1906), American politician from Ohio
- Richard H. Williams (New York politician) (1807–?), American politician from New York
- Richard Henry Williams (1852–1924), Canadian lumber merchant and political figure in Saskatchewan
- Richard S. Williams (before 1820–after 1853), American politician from New York

== Sports ==
=== Baseball ===
- Dick Williams (1929–2011), American baseball player and manager
- Dick Williams (executive), American baseball executive
- Rick Williams (baseball, born 1952), American baseball pitcher (Houston Astros, 1978–79)
- Rick Williams (baseball, born 1956), American baseball coach and scout

=== Basketball ===
- Richard Williams (basketball coach), American basketball coach at Mississippi State University from 1986 to 1998
- Richie Williams (basketball) (born 1987), American basketball player

=== Cricket ===
- Richard Williams (cricketer, born 1901) (1901–1982), English, played for Worcestershire
- Richard Williams (cricketer, born 1957), Welsh-born, played for Northamptonshire
- Reggie Williams (cricketer) (Richard Charles James Williams, born 1969), English, played for Gloucestershire

=== Football ===
- Richard Williams (American football) (born 1960), American running back for Atlanta Falcons and Houston Oilers
- Richard Williams (Australian rules footballer) (1905–1958)
- Richard Williams (English footballer) (1869–after 1895), English, played for Everton and Luton Town
- Richard L. Williams (soccer), Canadian soccer player
- Richard Parry Williams (1863–?), Welsh international footballer
- Dick Williams (footballer) (1905–1983), English footballer
- Richie Williams (born 1970), American soccer coach and former player
- Richie Williams (Canadian football) (born 1983), American quarterback who played in Canada

=== Rugby ===
- Richard Williams (rugby league) (born 1986), Australian rugby league footballer
- Richard Garnons Williams (1856–1915), Welsh rugby union player
- Dickie Williams (1925–1997), Welsh rugby union and rugby league footballer

=== Tennis ===
- Richard Williams (tennis coach) (born 1942), American coach and father of Venus and Serena Williams
- R. Norris Williams (1891–1968), American player and RMS Titanic survivor

=== Other sports ===
- Richard Williams (boxer) (born 1971), English boxer
- Richard Williams (racing driver) (born 1977), English racing driver

== Writers and academics ==
- Richard Williams (1835–1906), Welsh antiquarian
- Richard Williams (academic) (born 1960), English academic and engineer
- Richard Williams (journalist) (born 1947), English journalist
- Richard Allen Williams (born 1936), African-American physician and author
- Richard Bryn Williams (1902–1981), Welsh writer, poet, playwright and historian
- Richard D'Alton Williams (1822–1862), Irish physician and poet
- Richard Hughes Williams (1878–1919), Welsh language writer of short stories
- R. Stanley Williams (born 1951), American research scientist
- Richard Tecwyn Williams (1909–1979), Welsh biochemist

== Others ==
- Richard Williams (1802–1842), Welsh Calvinistic Methodist minister
- Richard Leroy Williams (1923–2011), American judge
- Richard Llewellyn Williams (born 1929), American diplomat
- Richard Mackenzie Williams (1882–1966), Welsh Anglican priest
- Richard T. Williams (before 1930–1956), American sailor, for whom Williams Field in Antarctica is named

== See also ==
- Dick Williams (disambiguation)
- Richie Williams (disambiguation)
- Ricky Williams (disambiguation)
- Ricardo Williams (disambiguation)
- Williams (surname)
