= Dick Williams (disambiguation) =

Dick Williams (1929–2011) was an American baseball player and manager.

Dick Williams may also refer to:

- R. Norris Williams (1891–1968), American tennis player
- Dick Williams (magician) (1927–2020), American magician
- Dick Williams (singer) (1926–2018), American singer
- Dick Anthony Williams (1934–2012), American actor
- Dick Williams (executive), American baseball executive
- Dick Williams (footballer) (1905–1983), English footballer
- Dick Williams (bowls), Welsh-born Canadian international lawn bowler
- Dick William, former host of Georgia politics show The Georgia Gang

== See also ==
- Richard Williams (disambiguation)
