= Richie Williams (disambiguation) =

Richie Williams (born 1970) is an American soccer coach and former player.

Richie Williams is also the name of:

- Richie Williams (basketball) (born 1987), American basketball player
- Richie Williams (Canadian football) (born 1983), American quarterback in Canadian football
- Richard Williams (rugby league) (born 1986), Indigenous Australian former rugby league footballer

== See also ==
- Richard Williams (disambiguation)
