= Anthony Watson (basketball) =

American basketball player (born 1964)

Personal information
- Born: September 25, 1964 (age 61) Chicago, Illinois, U.S.
- Listed height: 6 ft 3 in (1.91 m)
- Listed weight: 170 lb (77 kg)

Career information
- High school: Cooley (Detroit, Michigan)
- College: San Diego State (1982–1986)
- NBA draft: 1986: 4th round, 87th overall pick
- Drafted by: Denver Nuggets
- Position: Guard

Career history
- 1986: La Crosse Catbirds
- 1988–?: Athletes in Action

Career highlights
- WAC Player of the Year (1986); 2× First-team All-WAC (1985, 1986)
- Stats at Basketball Reference

Anthony Scott Watson (born September 25, 1964) is an American former professional basketball player. He played college basketball for the San Diego State Aztecs. He led the Western Athletic Conference (WAC) in scoring in 1986, when he was named the WAC Player of the Year. Watson was named twice to both the All-WAC first team as well the All-WAC tournament Team. He finished his Aztec career with the school record for most points scored in a game (54), and left with the second-most career points (1,735) in school history.

Watson was drafted by the Denver Nuggets of the National Basketball Association (NBA) in the fourth round of the 1986 NBA draft with the 87th overall pick. He did not make the team, but went on to play professionally in the Continental Basketball Association (CBA) as well as for Athletes in Action.

== Early life ==
Watson was born in Chicago to Shirley Watson and Edward Johnson. He developed close relationships with his parents, who never married. Watson grew up for 12 years in Chicago, raised mostly by his grandmother, Ora Mae Watson. She became one of the biggest influences in his life. Watson began playing basketball in Chicago, but his best memories of the city were of jumping on trains running 5 to 10 mph (8.0 to 16.1 kilometres per hour) from tracks blocks away from his home, and riding on the outside of the train to a swimming pool a few miles away. In the eighth grade, Watson moved to Detroit with his mother and her new husband, a Baptist minister, with whom Watson also developed a good relationship.

Watson played basketball at Cooley High School in Detroit. As a senior, he averaged 31 points, 10 rebounds, and 8 assists—earning all-state honors. Most outside observers anticipated that he would play college basketball nearby at Michigan, joining Cooley teammate Roy Tarpley. However, Watson wanted to play immediately, and instead chose to move 2,000 miles (3,200 km) west to play at San Diego State University (SDSU).

== College career ==
As a freshman with the Aztecs, Watson made his first start in the ninth game of the season, scoring 26 points in an 89–85 win over Florida State. Aztecs coach Smokey Gaines made the switch after not getting enough production from the team's senior guards. Watson started the final 20 games of the season while averaging 11.4 points. At the beginning of his sophomore year in September 1983, Watson was declared academically ineligible. While his grade point average was sufficient, he was ruled to lack "quality points"—used to determine whether a student is on schedule to graduate with their class—in his coursework, despite the semester of summer school he recently finished. Not allowed to take classes at SDSU, he enrolled in accelerated classes at San Diego Mesa College. Since he was no longer on scholarship, he worked at a gas station to pay for school. Busy with study and work, he had no time to play basketball. In December, he regained his eligibility, but already missed the first five games of the season. Impacted by his inactivity, he did not re-enter the starting lineup until mid-January. He shot just 39 percent while averaging 10.5 points that season, and later regretted not having redshirted.

The following season in 1984–85, Watson was an All-WAC first team selection after leading the team in scoring with a 17.5 average. He was twice named the WAC player of the week, and also was honored as Sports Illustrated's national player of the week. The Aztecs were 11–5 in the conference and won the WAC tournament, where Watson was named to the All-WAC Tournament Team. SDSU's season record of 23–8 was at the time their best record ever as a Division I team. They qualified for the 1985 NCAA tournament, their first invite in nine years. In their first-round loss to the UNLV Runnin' Rebels, Watson scored 19 points and had six assists.

Before the start of his senior season, Watson ran into teammate Creon Dorsey during practice and suffered a split in the webbing between the middle and index fingers of his right hand. The injury needed 10 stitches and had to be wrapped heavily with gauze and tape. The Aztecs started the season 0–7, and Watson was averaging around 17 points through the first five weeks. He was frustrated with his injury and the team's poor start. Furthermore, injuries to two frontcourt players forced the team to move him out of position from guard to small forward, where the 6-foot-3-inch (1.91 m) Watson faced stronger players standing around 6 feet 8 inches (2.03 m). When Steffond Johnson returned to the lineup in mid-January, Watson was able to move back outside. His hand had also healed, and his play improved. He set the Aztecs' school record for most points scored in a game (54) against U.S. International University on February 20, 1986. His 22 free throws that night were also a record. Watson was again named to the All-WAC Tournament team after the Aztecs ended their season with a 78–75 loss to the UTEP Miners in the conference tournament. He finished the season as the WAC's scoring champion with a 22.5 point average, becoming the first Aztec since Kim Goetz in 1979 to lead the conference in scoring. Watson was named to the All-WAC first team and won the WAC Player of the Year. He also received honorable mention All-American honors from the Associated Press.

Watson finished his career at SDSU as the second leading scorer (1,735) in school history behind Michael Cage, moving to third after Brandon Heath passed him in 2006. Watson also left with a school record of 702 career field goals. He was inducted into the Aztec Hall of Fame in 2015.

== Professional career ==
Watson was drafted in the fourth round of the 1986 NBA draft by the Denver Nuggets. Though he played mostly shooting guard in college, Watson at only 6 feet 3 inches (1.91 m) was projected as a point guard. He was cut by the Nuggets in training camp after they acquired another guard, Darrell Walker. He joined the La Crosse Catbirds of the CBA, entering the 1986–87 season projected as a backup point guard to Dennis Nutt. Watson was released by La Crosse on December 23, 1986.

Watson returned to San Diego State in early 1987 to serve as a graduate assistant coach. He joined Athletes in Action in 1988.
