= Santa Barbara Islanders =

American basketball team

- Conference: National (1989–90)
- Division: Western (1989–90)
- League: CBA
- Established: 1989
- Folded: 1990
- Arena: SBCC Sports Pavilion
- Capacity: 2,500
- Location: Santa Barbara, California
- Team colors: purple, white, orange
- President: Craig A. Case
- Team manager: Curt Pickering
- Ownership: Shirley Otto, Howard Schneider
Home	Away

The Santa Barbara Islanders were a professional basketball team based in Santa Barbara, California. They played only one season in the Continental Basketball Association (CBA), the defunct development league for the National Basketball Association (NBA).

== History ==
In 1989 the CBA decided to expand the league to the West Coast, and admitted expansion teams: on May 18, 1989 the CBA board approved the addition of two teams, the San Jose Jammers and the Santa Barbara Islanders, and on June 10, 1989 it was announced that the league had admitted the two franchises. The idea of a team in Santa Barbara was already being discussed in 1987 between Shirley Otto, Bill Bertka and Craig Case, a local investor. A total of four expansion franchises entered the CBA for the 1989–90 season: in addition to the Islanders and the Jammers, the other two were the Grand Rapids Hoops and the Sioux Falls Skyforce. The league then held a 12-round expansion draft on June 22, 1989: the Islanders selected Rod Foster, Brad Wright, Herb Johnson, Cedric Henderson, Mike Phelps, Steve Burtt, Bobby Lee Hurt, Eddie Hughes, Devin Durrant, Steffond Johnson, Ron Cavenall and Larry Spriggs. Only Johnson, Cavenall, Phelps and Spriggs actually played for the team.

Sonny Allen was appointed as head coach, and Don Ford was his assistant coach; the Santa Barbara City College Sports Pavilion was chosen as the home arena. The team was assigned to the Western Division of the National Conference and debuted on November 14, 1989 at home against the Columbus Horizon, winning the game 123-113. The Islanders ran a fast offense and led the CBA in scoring through the first games of the season. They had a very successful season, ending with a 37-19 record (the fourth-best in the entire CBA), winning the Western Division and qualifying for the playoffs. Derrick Gervin led the league in scoring with a 31.7 points per game average. In the playoffs the Islanders won the National Conference semifinals against the Tulsa Fast Breakers in five games (3-2, including two overtime wins), but lost the finals against the Rapid City Thrillers in six games (4-2). On March 22, 1990 Jim Les set a CBA single game playoff record for assists in a game with 24 in a 137-133 win against the Tulsa Fast Breakers.

Despite their success on the court, the franchise had developed severe financial issues throughout the season, and debt ultimately forced the dismissal of the team from the league.

== Season-by-season records ==
Years	Wins	Losses	Winning percentage	Head coach(s)	Ref
1989–1990	37	19	.661	Sonny Allen	

== All-time roster ==
- Luther Burks
- Ron Cavenall
- Brian Christiansen
- Stan Easterling
- Antoine Ford
- Kevin Francewar
- Derrick Gervin
- Cedric Hunter
- Craig Johnson
- Steffond Johnson
- Jim Les
- Carlton McKinney
- Mitch McMullen
- Jawann Oldham
- Mike Phelps
- Mike Ratliff
- Larry Spriggs
- Rory White
- Leon Wood

== Awards ==
- CBA scoring champion: Derrick Gervin
