= Ricky Williams (disambiguation) =

Ricky Williams (born 1977) is a former American football running back (New Orleans Saints, Miami Dolphins, and Baltimore Ravens).

Ricky or Rick Williams may also refer to:

== Entertainment ==
- Ricky Williams (musician) (1956–1992), vocalist
- Ricky Williams (The Young and the Restless), fictional character from The Young and the Restless

== Politics ==
- Rick Williams (Australian politician), member of the Legislative Assembly of Queensland
- Rick Williams (Georgia politician) (born 1952), member of the Georgia Senate

== Sports ==
- Ricky Williams (American football, born 1978) (born 1978), former American football running back who played with the Indianapolis Colts
- Rick Williams (baseball, born 1952) (born 1952), American major league pitcher for the Houston Astros
- Rick Williams (baseball, born 1956) (born 1956), American scout and former coach and minor league player, son of Dick Williams
- Ricky Williams (darts player) (born 1989), British darts player

== Other fields ==
- R. Owen Williams, American education executive

== See also ==
- Ricardo Williams (disambiguation)
- Richard Williams (disambiguation)
