= Ricardo Williams =

Ricardo Williams may refer to:

- Ricardo Williams (boxer) (born 1981), American boxer
- Ricardo Williams (cricketer) (born 1968), English cricketer
- Ricardo Williams (sprinter) (born 1976), Jamaican Olympic athlete
- Ricky Williams (The Young and the Restless), a character from the American soap opera, The Young and the Restless

== See also ==
- Ricky Williams (disambiguation)
- Richard Williams (disambiguation)
