= Carlton McKinney =

American retired professional basketball player

Personal information
- Born: October 21, 1964 (age 62) San Diego, California
- Listed height: 6 ft 4 in (1.93 m)
- Listed weight: 189 lb (86 kg)

Career information
- High school: Nixon-Smiley (Nixon, Texas)
- College: Tulsa (1983–1985); SMU (1986–1988)
- NBA draft: 1988: undrafted
- Playing career: 1988–1996
- Position: Shooting guard
- Number: 14, 4

Career history
- 1988–1989: Topeka Sizzlers
- 1989: Los Angeles Clippers
- 1989–1990: Quad City Thunder
- 1990: Santa Barbara Islanders
- 1990–1991: Fabriano Basket
- 1991: New York Knicks
- 1991–1992: Rapid City Thrillers
- 1992: AEK Athens
- 1992: CAI Zaragoza
- 1992–1993: Fargo-Moorhead Fever
- 1993–1994: Grand Rapids Hoops
- 1992: Sioux Falls Skyforce

Career highlights
- CBA champion (1996); First-team All-SWC (1988)
- Stats at NBA.com
- Stats at Basketball Reference

Carlton B. McKinney (born October 21, 1964), is a retired professional basketball player. McKinney played collegiate ball with the University of Tulsa Golden Hurricane (1983–1985) and Southern Methodist University Mustangs (1986–88). He briefly played in the NBA with the Los Angeles Clippers (1989) and the New York Knicks (1991). McKinney is currently the athletic director and boys' basketball coach at his high school alma mater, Nixon-Smiley High School, in Nixon, TX.

== Professional career ==
McKinney briefly played in the NBA with the Los Angeles Clippers (1989) and the New York Knicks (1991). He played the majority of his professional basketball career in the CBA for the Topeka Sizzlers (1988–89), Quad City Thunder (1989–90), Santa Barbara Islanders (1990), Rapid City Thrillers (1990–91), Fargo-Moorhead Fever (1991–1992), Grand Rapids Hoops (1993–94) and Sioux Falls Skyforce (1994–1996), where he helped win a championship before retiring in 1996. He also played overseas in Europe notably in Italy, Greece and Spain.
