= Billy White (basketball) =

American basketball player (born 1989)

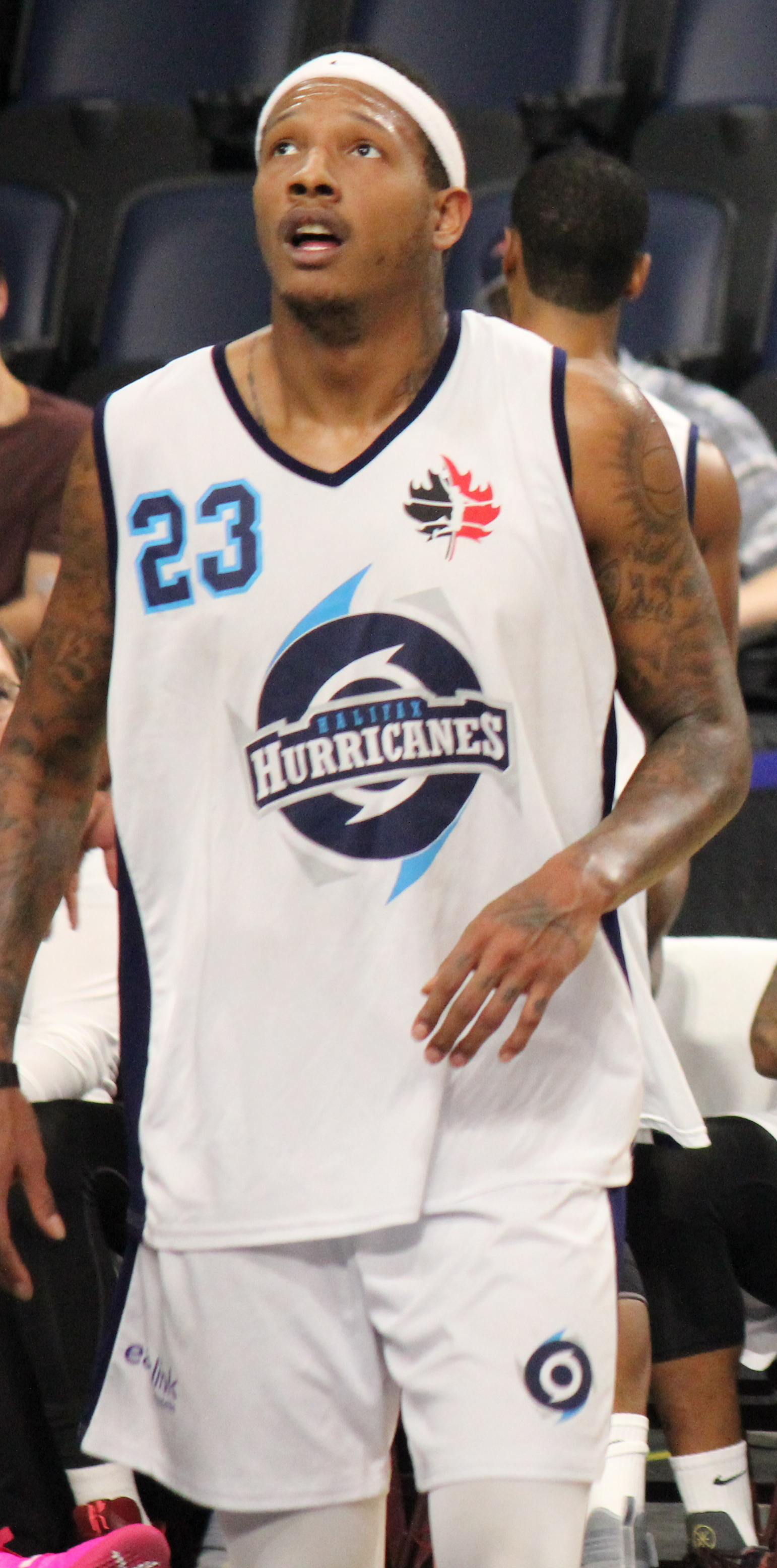
- White in 2017

No. 23 – Windsor Express
- Position: Power forward
- League: Basketball Super League

Personal information
- Born: January 26, 1989 (age 37) Las Vegas, Nevada, U.S.
- Listed height: 6 ft 8 in (2.03 m)
- Listed weight: 235 lb (107 kg)

Career information
- High school: Green Valley (Henderson, Nevada)
- College: San Diego State (2007–2011)
- NBA draft: 2011: undrafted
- Playing career: 2011–present

Career history
- 2011–2012: Iowa Energy
- 2012–2013: Rethymno Aegean
- 2013–2014: Ostioneros de Guaymas
- 2014: Fuerza Regia
- 2014–2015: Elitzur Ramla
- 2015–2016: Halifax Hurricanes
- 2016: Apollon Limassol
- 2016–2018: Halifax Hurricanes
- 2018–2020: Moncton Magic
- 2021: Hebraica Macabi
- 2022–2023: Windsor Express
- 2023: Correcaminos UAT Victoria
- 2024-2025: London Lightning
- 2025-2026: Windsor Express

Career highlights
- 2× NBL Canada champion (2016, 2019); NBL Canada Most Valuable Player (2020); 2× All-NBL Canada First Team (2017, 2018); All-NBL Canada Second Team (2019)

Billy Roy White III (born January 26, 1989) is an American professional basketball player. He competed with San Diego State at the college level. After graduating, White joined the NBA D-League and then played for multiple international clubs.

== College career ==
He played college basketball for San Diego State under coach Steve Fisher. In 2009, it was alleged that White received improper academic assistance. However, the SDSU athletic department determined there was not sufficient evidence and the case was dropped.

In his senior season, he posted 21 points and 12 rebounds in the Mountain West Conference championship game versus BYU. In the NCAA Tournament, White had 16 points and 13 rebounds in a crucial overtime victory over Temple, shooting 8-for-15. "Billy's performance has definitely been a boost to this team, especially to the team's confidence," teammate D. J. Gay said. "…You couldn't ask for a better time for him to peak like this." As a senior, White started 36 games, averaging 10.3 points, 4.4 rebounds, 1.6 assists, 1.05 steals and 26.6 minutes per game. He shot 56.2 percent from the floor, 34.6 percent from behind the arc and 73.2 percent from the free throw line. He was a Mountain West Conference All-Tournament Team selection and was an All-MWC honorable mention selection for the third straight season. For his career, White scored a total of 1,294 points and finished first in Aztec history in games started (124).

== Professional career ==
White went undrafted in the 2011 NBA draft, but signed with the Iowa Energy of the NBA D-League on December 8, 2011. On December 15, he was signed by the Miami Heat, though he never played with them. He played professionally in Greece and Mexico. For the 2014–15 season, White played for Elitzur Ramla B.C. of the Israeli league, posting averages of 21.3 points, 8.6 rebounds, and 2.1 assists per game.

In November 2015, White was signed by the Halifax Hurricanes of the National Basketball League of Canada. On June 14, 2016, the Hurricanes won the 2016 NBL Canada Finals over the London Lightning, 4–3. In 52 NBL Canada games, White averaged 11.5 points, 4.8 rebounds and 1.1 assists per game. He signed with the Cypriot team Apollon Limassol BC in September 2016.

White re-joined the Halifax Hurricanes, and in 2018 was named to the First Team All-NBLC. On August 14, 2018, White's signing rights were traded to the Moncton Magic of the NBL Canada in exchange for those of Terry Thomas. Two days later, he was officially signed by the Magic. In the 2018–19 season, White averaged 17.3 points, 6.7 rebounds, and 3.5 assists per game. He was named to the All-NBLC Second Team. White was named league MVP in 2020, after averaging 18.9 points, 6.7 rebounds, and 2.7 assists per game.

He then joined Hebraica Macabi in Uruguay for the 2021–22 season.

== The Basketball Tournament ==
Billy White played for Team CitiTeam Blazers in the 2018 edition of The Basketball Tournament. In two games, he averaged 2.0 points per game and 4.5 rebounds per game on 67 percent shooting. CitiTeam Blazers made it to the Second Round before falling to Team Challenge ALS.

In 2021, he played for the San Diego Guardians, a member of The Basketball League (TBL).
