= Don Ford =

American basketball player, power forward

Personal information
- Born: December 31, 1952 (age 73) Santa Barbara, California, U.S.
- Listed height: 6 ft 9 in (2.06 m)
- Listed weight: 215 lb (98 kg)

Career information
- High school: Santa Barbara (Santa Barbara, California)
- College: Santa Barbara CC (1971–1972); New Mexico (1972–1973); UC Santa Barbara (1974–1975)
- NBA draft: 1975: 6th round, 92nd overall pick
- Drafted by: Los Angeles Lakers
- Playing career: 1975–1983
- Position: Power forward
- Number: 35

Career history
- 1975–1980: Los Angeles Lakers
- 1980–1982: Cleveland Cavaliers
- 1982–1983: Auxilium Torino

Career NBA statistics
- Points: 3,016 (6.4 ppg)
- Rebounds: 1,691 (3.6 rpg)
- Assists: 647 (1.4 apg)
- Stats at NBA.com
- Stats at Basketball Reference

Donald J. Ford (born December 31, 1952) is an American former professional basketball player who was a power forward in the National Basketball Association (NBA) for the Los Angeles Lakers and Cleveland Cavaliers. He also was a member of the Auxilium Torino in Europe. He played college basketball for the UC Santa Barbara Gauchos.

== Early years ==
Ford attended Santa Barbara High School. He was a teammate of future NBA player Keith Wilkes (later Jamaal Wilkes). He enrolled at Santa Barbara City College. As a freshman in the 1971–1972 season, he contributed to a 26–6 record and a Western State Conference championship. He averaged 22 points and 10 rebounds per game, including 3 contests with 29 points. He received first-team All-American honors by the California Junior College Federation.

He transferred to the University of New Mexico after his freshman season. As a sophomore, he was a backup, posting 6.9 points and 4.1 rebounds per contest.

He transferred to the University of California, Santa Barbara at the end of his sophomore season. As a junior, he sat out the season because of the NCAA's transfer rules. As a senior, he averaged 19.6 points (led the team), 8.4 rebounds (led the team) and 2.5 assists (second on the team).

== Professional career ==
Ford was selected by the Los Angeles Lakers in the 6th round (92nd overall) of the 1975 NBA draft. He spent four-and-a-half seasons with the team and was mostly known for his defense, while averaging 6.4 points and 3.6 rebounds per game.

In the 1979–80 championship season, his playing time was limited behind Jamaal Wilkes, Jim Chones and Spencer Haywood. On February 15, 1980, he was traded along with a 1980 1st round draft pick (#22-Chad Kinch) to the Cleveland Cavaliers, in exchange for Butch Lee and a 1982 1st round draft pick (#1-James Worthy).

On January 19, 1982, he was waived after being passed on the depth chart by Keith Herron. He played in 474 games, averaging 6.4 points, 3.6 rebounds and 1.4 assists.

In 1982, he signed with the Auxilium Torino in Italy's Lega Basket Serie A.

== Personal life ==
In 1989, he was named assistant coach and director of community relations to the Santa Barbara Islanders of the Continental Basketball Association.

Ford was married to Patti Tate, sister of actress Sharon Tate. They had three children. He currently lives in Santa Barbara where he works as a real estate agent, as well as serving as color commentator on UCSB basketball radio broadcasts.

== Career statistics ==
Legend
GP	Games played	GS	Games started	MPG	Minutes per game
FG%	Field goal percentage	3P%	3-point field goal percentage	FT%	Free throw percentage
RPG	Rebounds per game	APG	Assists per game	SPG	Steals per game
BPG	Blocks per game	PPG	Points per game	**Bold**	Career high

=== NBA ===
==== Regular season ====
Year	Team	GP	GS	MPG	FG%	3P%	FT%	RPG	APG	SPG	BPG	PPG
1975–76	L.A. Lakers	76		24.2	.438		.748	4.4	1.5	.7	.2	**9.6**
1976–77	L.A. Lakers	**82**	**82**	21.7	.460		.716	4.3	1.6	.7	.3	7.3
1977–78	L.A. Lakers	79		**24.6**	.472		.756	**4.5**	**1.8**	**.9**	**.6**	7.7
1978–79	L.A. Lakers	79		19.5	.507		.809	3.4	1.3	.6	.3	6.7
1979–80	L.A. Lakers	52		11.2	**.508**	.000	.821	1.9	.7	.2	.3	3.0
1979–80	Cleveland	21		20.0	.451	**.500**	.880	4.1	1.4	.5	.3	7.3
1980–81	Cleveland	64		15.6	.446	.000	**.917**	2.6	1.3	.2	.2	3.5
1981–82	Cleveland	21	1	9.6	.375	.000	.833	1.7	.5	.4	.0	1.1
Career		474	83	19.6	.464	.143	.773	3.6	1.4	.6	.3	6.4

==== Playoffs ====
Year	Team	GP	MPG	FG%	FT%	RPG	APG	SPG	BPG	PPG
1977	L.A. Lakers	**11**	**30.3**	.429	**.750**	**5.3**	**3.4**	**1.5**	**.4**	**10.1**
1978	L.A. Lakers	1	10.0	.000	–	5.0	.0	1.0	.0	.0
1979	L.A. Lakers	8	17.3	**.533**	.333	2.8	.9	.4	.3	4.1
Career		20	24.1	.443	.718	4.3	2.2	1.1	.3	7.2
