= Rebecca Chase Williams =

American politician

Rebecca Chase Williams was an American journalist and Mayor of Brookhaven, Georgia. Previously a District 1 City Councilwoman, Williams became mayor after the city's inaugural mayor, J. Max Davis, resigned in May 2015. Prior to her public service, Williams was a distinguished ABC News journalist for more than twenty years.

She was the wife of Dick Williams, Editor and publisher of The Dunwoody Crier, a weekly newspaper covering Dunwoody, Brookhaven, and Sandy Springs. Williams hosted the weekly Atlanta television program, The Georgia Gang for decades. She died of cancer on March 11, 2020.
