= Xavier Thames =

American basketball player (born 1991)

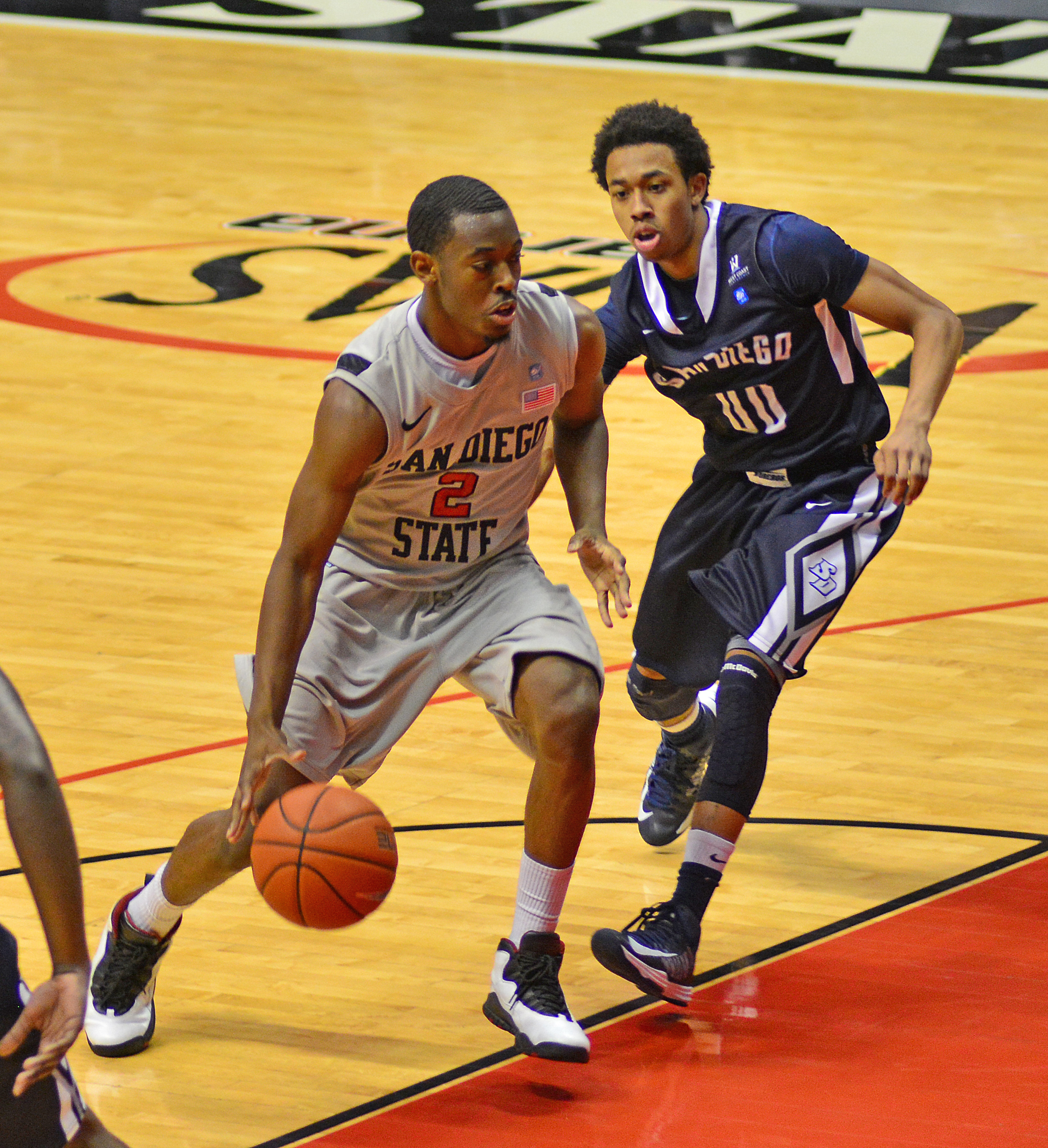
- Thames (left) during his college tenure with San Diego State

Personal information
- Born: January 9, 1991 (age 35) Sacramento, California, U.S.
- Listed height: 6 ft 3 in (1.91 m)
- Listed weight: 195 lb (88 kg)

Career information
- High school: Pleasant Grove (Elk Grove, California)
- College: Washington State (2009–2010); San Diego State (2011–2014)
- NBA draft: 2014: 2nd round, 59th overall pick
- Drafted by: Toronto Raptors
- Playing career: 2014–2022
- Position: Point guard / shooting guard

Career history
- 2014–2015: Sevilla
- 2015–2016: Fort Wayne Mad Ants
- 2016–2017: MZT Skopje
- 2017: Bnei Herzliya
- 2017–2018: Trikala Aries
- 2018: Canterbury Rams
- 2018–2019: Egis Körmend
- 2019–2020: VEF Rīga
- 2020–2021: Egis Körmend
- 2021–2022: DEAC
- 2022: CBet Jonava

Career highlights
- Latvian League champion (2020); Macedonian League champion (2017); Macedonian Supercup winner (2017); MWC Player of the Year (2014); First-team All-MWC (2014); MWC All-Defensive Team (2014)
- Stats at Basketball Reference

Xavier Raynard Thames (born January 9, 1991) is an American former professional basketball player. He played college basketball for the Washington State Cougars and San Diego State Aztecs.

== High school career ==
Thames attended Pleasant Grove High School in Elk Grove, California. As a sophomore, he averaged 20 points, four assists, five rebounds and four steals per game while earning first team All-Delta River League honors. As a junior, he averaged 26 points, six assists, five rebounds and three steals per game while leading Pleasant Grove to a 16–14 record and being honored as a first team all-league and second team all-city selection.

On November 12, 2008, he signed a National Letter of Intent to play college basketball at Washington State University.

As a senior, he averaged 21 points, six assists, six rebounds and three steals per game while leading Pleasant Grove to a 25–6 record, and was again honored as a first team all-league and second team all-city selection.

== College career ==
In his freshman season at Washington State, Thames had four double-figure scoring games, the first of which came on December 2, 2009, against Gonzaga when he scored 11 points. Prior to the Gonzaga game, he helped the Cougars to the 2009 Great Alaska Shootout title. In 31 games (four starts), he averaged 4.6 points 1.5 rebounds and 1.2 assists in 17.6 minutes per game.

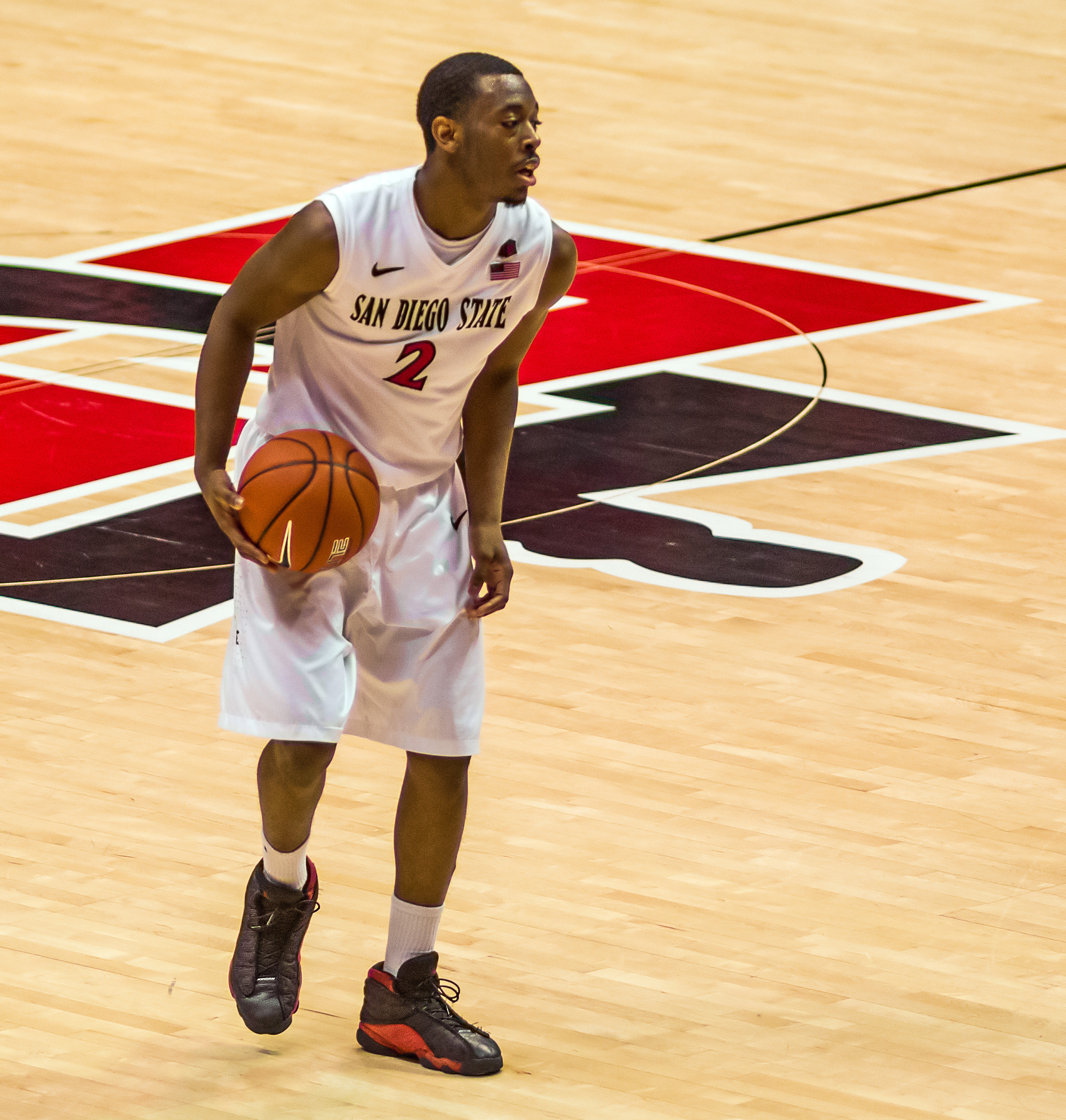
Xavier Thames at San Diego State

In May 2010, Thames transferred to San Diego State and subsequently sat out the 2010–11 season due to NCAA transfer rules. In his sophomore season, he earned honorable mention All-Mountain West accolades. In 31 games (30 games), he averaged 10.1 points, 3.2 rebounds, 4.1 assists and 1.0 steals in 33.8 minutes per game.

In his junior season, he scored in double-figures 15 times and led the team in scoring three times and in assists seven times. He also ended the season having played 32 or more minutes in a season-best six straight games, which was a season first. In 30 games (25 starts), he averaged 9.5 points, 2.7 rebounds, 2.4 assists and 1.0 steals in 28.7 minutes per game.

In his senior season, he was named the 2014 Mountain West Player of the Year. He was also named to the All-MWC first team and the MWC All-Defensive team. In 36 games, he averaged 17.6 points, 2.9 rebounds, 3.2 assists and 1.6 steals in 31.3 minutes per game.

== Professional career ==
=== Baloncesto Sevilla (2014–2015) ===
On June 26, 2014, Thames was selected with the 59th overall pick in the 2014 NBA draft by the Toronto Raptors. He was later traded to the Brooklyn Nets for cash considerations on draft night. In July 2014, he joined the Nets for the 2014 NBA Summer League.

On August 6, 2014, Thames signed a one-year deal with Baloncesto Sevilla of the Liga ACB. On January 23, 2015, he was released by Sevilla.

=== Fort Wayne Mad Ants (2015–2016) ===
On February 11, Thames was acquired by the Fort Wayne Mad Ants of the NBA Development League. Six days later, he made his debut with the Mad Ants in an 87–86 loss to the Maine Red Claws, recording three points and one rebound in 26 minutes.

In July 2015, Thames re-joined the Brooklyn Nets for the 2015 NBA Summer League. On October 29, 2015, he was reacquired by the Fort Wayne Mad Ants.

=== MZT Skopje (2016–2017) ===
On August 20, 2016, Thames signed a two-year deal with Macedonian club MZT Skopje. Thames helped the team to win the Macedonian League title.

=== Bnei Herzliya (2017) ===
On July 27, 2017, Thames signed a two-year deal with Israeli club Bnei Herzliya. However, on December 17, 2017, Thames parted ways with Herzliya after appearing in 19 official games (both in the FIBA Europe Cup and the Israeli Premier League competitions). He averaged 8.7 points, 2.1 rebounds and 1.4 assists per game.

=== Trikala Aries (2017–2018) ===
On December 23, 2017, he signed with Greek club Trikala Aries.

=== Canterbury Rams (2018) ===
On April 13, 2018, Thames signed with the Canterbury Rams for the 2018 New Zealand NBL season.

=== Egis Körmend (2018–2019) ===
In December 2018, Thames joined Hungarian team Egis Körmend.

=== VEF Rīga (2019–2020) ===
On November 1, 2019, Thames joined VEF Rīga of the Latvian Basketball League (LBL). He averaged 10.3 points and 3.7 assists per game over 29 games.

=== Second stint with Egis Körmend (2020–2021) ===
On June 17, 2020, Thames re-joined Egis Körmend. He averaged 15.7 points, 5.0 assists, 2.6 rebounds, and 1.7 steals per game.

=== DEAC (2021–2022) ===
On July 21, 2021, Thames signed with DEAC of the Nemzeti Bajnokság I/A.
