= Kim Goetz =

American basketball player

Personal information
- Born: August 23, 1957 Moscow, Idaho, U.S.
- Died: March 17, 2008 (aged 50) San Diego, California, U.S.
- Listed height: 6 ft 7 in (2.01 m)
- Listed weight: 195 lb (88 kg)

Career information
- High school: Moscow (Moscow, Idaho)
- College: College of Southern Idaho (1975–1977); San Diego State (1977–1979)
- NBA draft: 1979: 2nd round, 34th overall pick
- Drafted by: New York Knicks
- Position: Small forward

Career highlights
- First-team All-WAC (1979); NJCAA champion (1976)
- Stats at Basketball Reference

Kim F. Goetz (August 23, 1957 – March 17, 2008) was an American basketball player. He was nicknamed "the Long Ranger" due to his wide shooting range while playing for the San Diego State Aztecs.

Goetz began his collegiate career with the College of Southern Idaho Golden Eagles, where he led the team to its first NJCAA championship in 1976. He transferred to play for the San Diego State Aztecs in 1977, where he had an immediate impact as the team's leading scorer during his debut season. During his senior season, he led the Western Athletic Conference (WAC) in scoring with 20.5 points per game and earned a first-team All-WAC selection. In his final game with the team, he set an Aztecs scoring record with 44 points in a loss to the Utah Utes. (Note: The record was surpassed by Anthony Watson's 54 point performance in 1986. Goetz's 44 points game still ranks second in Aztecs history.) Goetz became the first Aztecs player to surpass the 1,000 points mark in two seasons. He holds the school's record for career free-throw percentage while also ranking second in scoring average.

Goetz was selected by the New York Knicks as the 34th overall pick in the 1979 NBA draft but never played in the National Basketball Association (NBA). He stayed in California and worked as a special education teacher at San Pasqual High School in Escondido. Goetz died of an apparent heart attack.

He was inducted into the College of Southern Idaho Hall of Fame in 2005 and the San Diego State Aztec Hall of Fame in 2006.

== Career statistics ==
Legend
| GP | Games played | GS | Games started | MPG | Minutes per game |
| FG% | Field goal percentage | 3P% | 3-point field goal percentage | FT% | Free throw percentage |
| RPG | Rebounds per game | APG | Assists per game | SPG | Steals per game |
| BPG | Blocks per game | PPG | Points per game | **Bold** | Career high |

=== College ===
| Year | Team | GP | GS | MPG | FG% | 3P% | FT% | RPG | APG | SPG | BPG | PPG |
|---|---|---|---|---|---|---|---|---|---|---|---|---|
| 1977–78 | San Diego State | **28** | – | – | **.514** | – | .803 | 2.8 | **1.9** | – | – | 16.9 |
| 1978–79 | San Diego State | 26 | **25** | – | .508 | – | **.902** | **4.4** | **1.9** | **1.2** | **.7** | **20.5** |
| Career | | 54 | 25 | 31.1 | .511 | – | .854 | 3.6 | 1.9 | 1.2 | .7 | 18.6 |
