= Steve Malovic =

American-Israeli basketball player (1956–2007)

Steve Malovic 'סטיב מלוביץ
Personal information
- Born: July 21, 1956 Cleveland, Ohio, U.S.
- Died: April 13, 2007 (aged 50) Phoenix, Arizona, U.S.
- Listed height: 6 ft 10 in (2.08 m)
- Listed weight: 230 lb (104 kg)

Career information
- High school: Alhambra (Phoenix, Arizona)
- College: USC (1974–1976); San Diego State (1977–1979)
- NBA draft: 1978: 7th round, 149th overall pick
- Drafted by: Phoenix Suns
- Playing career: 1979–1996
- Position: Power forward
- Number: 4, 44

Career history
- 1979: Washington Bullets
- 1979–1980: San Diego Clippers
- 1980: Detroit Pistons
- 1980–1981: Stella Azzurra Roma
- 1981: Real Madrid
- 1981–1985: Hapoel Ramat Gan
- 1985–1986: Viola Reggio Calabria
- 1986–1988: Elitzur Maccabi Netanya
- 1988–1991: Hapoel Galil Elyon
- 1991–1992: Beitar Tel Aviv
- 1992–1995: Hapoel Galil Elyon
- 1995–1996: Bnei Herzliya

Career highlights
- Israeli League champion (1993); First-team All-PCAA (1978); First-team All-WAC (1979)
- Stats at NBA.com
- Stats at Basketball Reference

Stephen Lawrence Malovic (Hebrew: 'סטיב מלוביץ; July 21, 1956 – April 13, 2007) was an American-Israeli basketball player. He played in the National Basketball Association (NBA) for one season and enjoyed a long career in Israel, where he ultimately obtained Israeli citizenship.

Malovic played college basketball for the USC Trojans and San Diego State Aztecs. He played 39 games in the 1979–80 NBA season for the Washington Bullets, San Diego Clippers and Detroit Pistons. Following that season, Malovic played in Italy and Spain, finally settling into the Israeli top league. He played until 1996 for several teams and was a part of an Israeli League championship with Hapoel Galil Elyon in 1993.

Malovic died of a heart attack on April 13, 2007.

== Career statistics ==
Legend
GP	Games played	GS	Games started	MPG	Minutes per game
FG%	Field goal percentage	3P%	3-point field goal percentage	FT%	Free throw percentage
RPG	Rebounds per game	APG	Assists per game	SPG	Steals per game
BPG	Blocks per game	PPG	Points per game	**Bold**	Career high

=== NBA ===
==== Regular season ====
Year	Team	GP	MPG	FG%	3P%	FT%	RPG	APG	SPG	BPG	PPG
1979–80	Washington	1	6.0	–	–	.250	.0	.0	**1.0**	.0	1.0
1979–80	San Diego	**28**	9.9	**.548**	–	**.778**	2.1	.4	.2	.0	1.9
1979–80	Detroit	10	**16.2**	.320	–	.714	**2.8**	**1.4**	.2	**.5**	**2.6**
Career		39	11.4	.463	–	.667	2.2	.7	.2	.2	2.1
