= San Diego State Aztecs men's basketball =

College men's basketball team

| 2026–27 San Diego State Aztecs men's basketball team |
- University: San Diego State University
- First season: 1921–22
- Head coach: Brian Dutcher (10th season)
- Location: San Diego, California
- Arena: Viejas Arena (capacity: 12,414)
- Conference: Pac-12
- Nickname: Aztecs
- Colors: Scarlet and black
- Student section: The Show
- All-time record: 1,485–1,125 (.569)

NCAA Division I tournament runner-up
- 2023
Other NCAA Division I tournament results
| Final Four | 2023 |
| Elite Eight | 1957*, 1967*, 2023 |
| Sweet Sixteen | 1957*, 1967*, 2011, 2014, 2023, 2024 |
| Appearances | 1957*, 1967*, 1968*, 1975, 1976, 1985, 2002, 2006, 2010, 2011, 2012, 2013, 2014, 2015, 2018, 2021, 2022, 2023, 2024, 2025 |

NAIA tournament champions
- 1941

Conference tournament champions
- Mountain West: 2002, 2006, 2010, 2011, 2018, 2021, 2023; WAC: 1985; PCAA: 1976

Conference regular-season champions
- Mountain West: 2006, 2011, 2012, 2014, 2015, 2016, 2020, 2021, 2023; PCAA: 1977, 1978

Uniforms
| Home | Away | Alternate |
- * at Division II level

For information on all San Diego State University sports, see San Diego State Aztecs

The San Diego State Aztecs men's basketball team is the men's college basketball program that represents San Diego State University (SDSU). The Aztecs compete in NCAA Division I as a member of the Pac-12 Conference. The team plays its home games at Viejas Arena.

The Aztecs have been to seventeen NCAA Division I tournaments since joining NCAA Division I in 1969, last appearing in the tournament in 2025. In the 2023 NCAA tournament, they reached the Final Four for the first time in program history, losing to UConn in the championship game. The Aztecs have won seven Mountain West Conference tournaments and nine regular season titles.

Notable alumni include 2-time NBA Finals MVP Kawhi Leonard and Baseball Hall of Fame inductee Tony Gwynn, who played both basketball and baseball for the Aztecs. Gwynn was drafted by both the San Diego Padres and the then-San Diego Clippers on the same day, June 9, 1981 (1981 Major League Baseball draft and 1981 NBA draft, respectively).

== Team history ==
The Aztecs first began play during the 1921–22 basketball season. The team played that season, as well as the next three, as part of the Southern California Junior College Conference due to proximity to other schools, despite the fact that SDSU (then known as San Diego Normal School) was not a junior college itself. The Aztecs joined the Southern California Intercollegiate Athletic Conference (SCIAC) in 1926 following a season as an independent, and competed in the NAIA until 1956, when they transitioned to the newly founded NCAA Division II. They competed in six NAIA Men's Basketball Championships. Finishing as runners up in 1939 and in 1940, the Aztecs finally prevailed and won the 1941 NAIA Division I men's basketball tournament. After competing in NCAA Division II from 1956 until 1969 they became an NCAA Division I school in the fall of 1969. The Aztecs moved from the Pacific Coast Athletic Association (PCAA), which is now known as the Big West Conference, to the Western Athletic Conference (WAC) in 1978. In 1999, the Aztecs left the WAC and became a charter member of the Mountain West Conference. Prior to entering the Mountain West, the team had been to three NCAA Division I men's basketball tournaments. During their time in the MWC, the Aztecs have won several conference championships and have been to nine NCAA tournaments and four NIT tournaments. In the 2010–11 season, the Aztecs were ranked as high as 4th in the nation and won their first ever games in the NCAA tournament, reaching the Sweet Sixteen. Following the 2013–14 season, the team reached its second Sweet Sixteen. In the 2019–20 season, the Aztecs finished with a 30–2 record for their best winning percentage in team history. The team spent seven straight weeks in the top 5 of both the AP Top 25 and Coaches Poll, finishing the season at #6 in both polls. The 2020 NCAA Division I men's basketball tournament was cancelled at the end of the season due to the COVID-19 pandemic. In the 2022–2023 season, the Aztecs reached their third Sweet Sixteen, first Elite Eight with a win over #1 Alabama, and first Final Four. The win over Creighton on March 26 in the South Region Final gave them their first Region championship in program history. On April 1, they became the first team from the Mountain West Conference to reach the National Championship after defeating FAU 72–71 on a buzzer-beating shot by point guard Lamont Butler. In the 2023 NCAA Division I men's basketball championship game, the Aztecs were defeated by the University of Connecticut Huskies by a score of 59–76.

== Rivalries ==
The Aztecs have three rivalries, the UNLV Rebels, the USD Toreros, and the BYU Cougars. The rivalry with the Rebels was especially fierce between the years 2010–2013, however the rivalry has cooled down significantly due to the one-sided nature of the affair. San Diego State has won 22 of 24 games against UNLV from 2014 to 2024. The USD Toreros are the Aztecs' crosstown rivals and play them near-annually in the City Championship. The Aztecs' rivalry with the BYU Cougars has been partially dormant since 2011, when the Cougars left the MWC for the WCC. The teams still play occasionally in non-conference games.

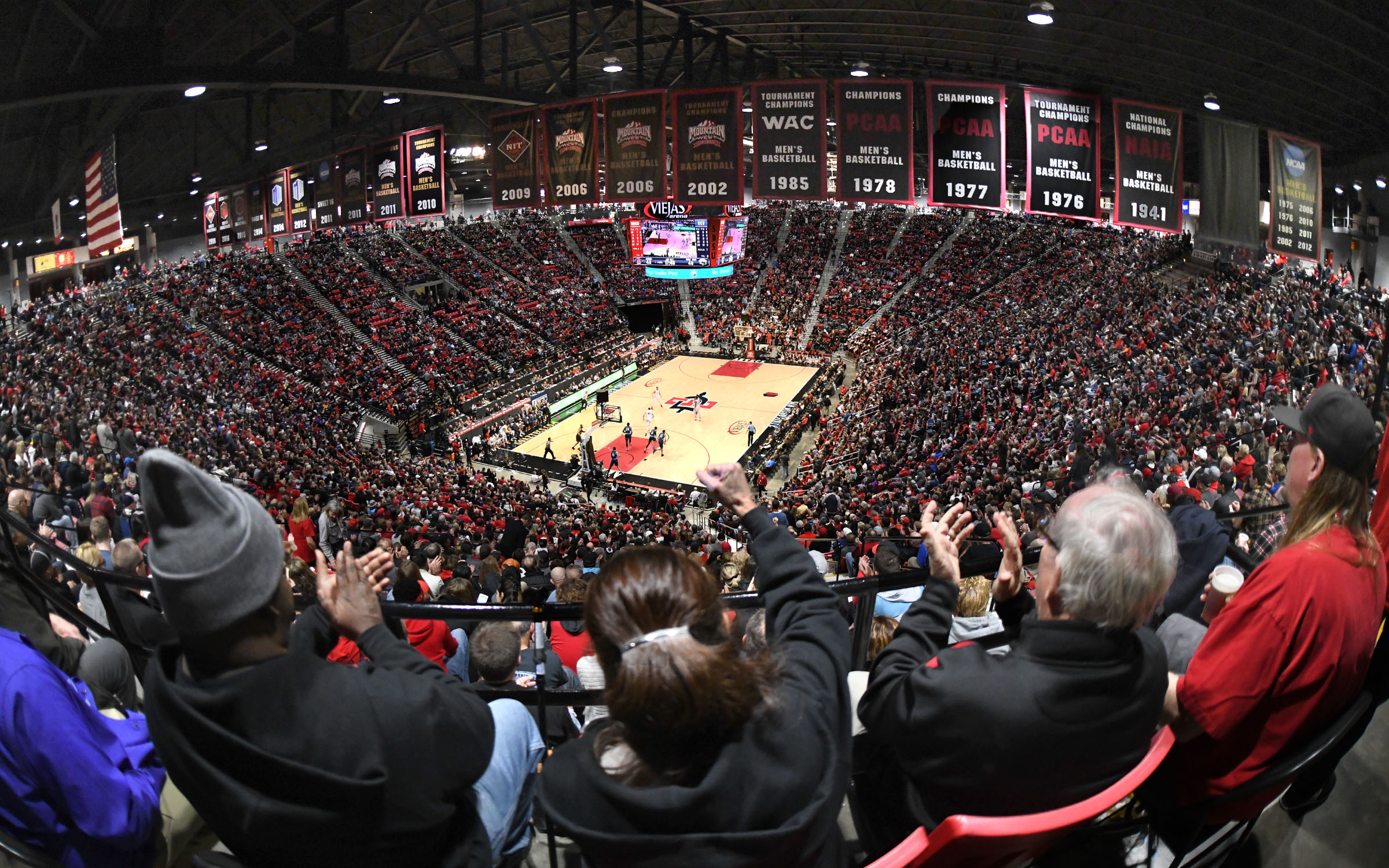
Viejas Arena

== Facilities ==
=== Viejas Arena ===
Viejas Arena (officially Viejas Arena at Aztec Bowl) is a multi-purpose arena located in San Diego, California on the campus of San Diego State University. The arena opened in 1997 and seats 12,414 for basketball and up to 12,845 for concerts.

Viejas Arena is the home of the San Diego State Aztecs men's and women's basketball teams. The arena also hosts the San Diego Mojo of the Pro Volleyball Federation. The arena features an "open-air" concourse design that allows fans to experience breaks, concessions, and event activities for games, concerts, and other events outdoors.

Prior to the opening of the arena, men's basketball played its home games primarily at Peterson Gymnasium (located across the street from Viejas Arena and the current home to the Aztec women's volleyball team), and, for more than 30 years, played on-and-off at the San Diego Sports Arena.

=== Jeff Jacobs JAM Center ===
In 2015, the San Diego State Athletics Department opened an on-campus state-of-the-art practice facility, The Jeff Jacobs JAM Center, for the Aztec men's basketball and women's basketball teams.

== Head coaches ==
| Head Coach | Seasons | Overall | Pct. |
|---|---|---|---|
| C.E. Peterson | 1922–1926 | 70–30 | .700 |
| Tom McMullen | 1927–1929 | 23–17 | .575 |
| Morris Gross | 1929–1942 | 190–85–1 | .690 |
| Don DeLauer and Dick Mitchell | 1943 | 14–9 | .609 |
| Alex Alexander | 1944–1945 | 17–26 | .395 |
| Charlie Smith | 1946–1948 | 45–36 | .563 |
| George Ziegenfuss | 1949–1969 | 316–229 | .580 |
| Dick Davis | 1970–1974 | 65–67 | .492 |
| Tim Vezie | 1975–1979 | 77–62 | .554 |
| Smokey Gaines | 1980–1987 | 112–117 | .489 |
| Jim Brandenburg | 1988–1992 | 52–87 | .356 |
| Jim Harrick Jr. (interim) | 1992 | 0–7 | .000 |
| Tony Fuller | 1993–1994 | 20–37 | .351 |
| Fred Trenkle | 1995–1999 | 55–83 | .399 |
| Steve Fisher | 2000–2017 | 386–209 | .649 |
| Brian Dutcher | 2018–present | 177–58 | .753 |

As of the 2024 Media Guide

== Postseason ==
=== NCAA Division I tournament results ===
The Aztecs have appeared in the NCAA Division I tournament 17 times, with a combined record of 13–17. They have reached the Sweet Sixteen four times, in 2011, 2014, 2023, and 2024; in 2023 they reached the Elite Eight, the Final Four, and the National Championship, all for the first time. Additionally, at 30–2 and ranked in the Top 10 they were considered a virtual lock for the 2020 NCAA Tournament, which was canceled due to the coronavirus pandemic.

| Year | Seed | Round | Opponent | Result |
|---|---|---|---|---|
| 1975 | N/A | Round of 32 | UNLV | L 80–90 |
| 1976 | N/A | Round of 32 | UCLA | L 64–74 |
| 1985 | 13 | Round of 64 | (4) UNLV | L 80–85 |
| 2002 | 13 | First Round | (4) Illinois | L 64–93 |
| 2006 | 11 | First Round | (6) Indiana | L 83–87 |
| 2010 | 11 | First Round | (6) Tennessee | L 59–62 |
| 2011 | 2 | First Round; Round of 32; Sweet Sixteen | (15) Northern Colorado (7) Temple (3) Connecticut | W 68–50; W 71–64 ^{2OT} L 67–74 |
| 2012 | 6 | First Round | (11) NC State | L 65–79 |
| 2013 | 7 | First Round; Round of 32 | (10) Oklahoma (15) Florida Gulf Coast | W 70–55; L 71–81 |
| 2014 | 4 | First Round; Round of 32; Sweet Sixteen | (13) New Mexico State (12) North Dakota State (1) Arizona | W 73–69 ^{OT} W 63–44; L 64–70 |
| 2015 | 8 | First Round; Round of 32 | (9) St. John's (1) Duke | W 76–64; L 49–68 |
| 2018 | 11 | First Round | (6) Houston | L 65–67 |
| 2021 | 6 | First Round | (11) Syracuse | L 62–78 |
| 2022 | 8 | First Round | (9) Creighton | L 69–72 ^{OT} |
| 2023 | 5 | First Round; Second Round; Sweet Sixteen; Elite Eight; Final Four; National Championship | (12) Charleston (13) Furman (1) Alabama (6) Creighton (9) Florida Atlantic (4) UConn | W 63–57; W 75–52; W 71–64; W 57–56; W 72–71; L 59–76 |
| 2024 | 5 | First Round; Second Round; Sweet Sixteen | (12) UAB (13) Yale (1) UConn | W 69–65; W 85–57; L 52–82 |
| 2025 | 11 | First Four | (11) North Carolina | L 68–95 |

=== NCAA Tournament seeding history ===
The NCAA began seeding the tournament with the 1978 edition with the present seeding format beginning the following year.

| Years → | '85 | '02 | '06 | '10 | '11 | '12 | '13 | '14 | '15 | '18 | '21 | '22 | '23 | '24 | '25 |
| Seeds → | 13 | 13 | 11 | 11 | 2 | 6 | 7 | 4 | 8 | 11 | 6 | 8 | 5 | 5 | 11 |

=== NIT results ===
The Aztecs have appeared in the National Invitation Tournament (NIT) six times, with a combined record of 8–6.

| Year | Round | Opponent | Result |
|---|---|---|---|
| 1982 | First round | UC Irvine | L 69–70 |
| 2003 | First round Second Round | UC Santa Barbara; Texas Tech | W 67–62; L 57–48 |
| 2007 | First round Second Round | Missouri State; Syracuse | W 74–70; L 64–80 |
| 2008 | First round | Florida | L 49–73 |
| 2009 | First round Second Round; Quarterfinals; Semifinals | Weber State; Kansas State; Saint Mary's; Baylor | W 65–49; W 70–52; W 70–66; L 62–76 |
| 2016 | First round Second Round; Quarterfinals; Semifinals | IPFW; Washington; Georgia Tech; George Washington | W 79–55; W 93–78; W 72–56; L 46–65 |

=== NCAA Division II tournament results ===
The Aztecs appeared in the NCAA Division II tournament three times, with a combined record of 5–3.

| Year | Round | Opponent | Result |
|---|---|---|---|
| 1957 | Regional semifinals Regional Finals; Elite Eight | Chapman; Regis; Cal State Los Angeles | W 75–56; W 81–78; L 55–57 |
| 1967 | Regional semifinals Regional Finals; Elite Eight | Portland State; Nevada Southern; Illinois State | W 101–73; W 88–71; L 76–77 ^{3OT} |
| 1968 | Regional semifinals Regional 3rd-place game | UC Irvine; UC Davis | L 69–78; W 79–72 |

=== NAIA tournament results ===
The Aztecs have appeared in the NAIA tournament five times. Their combined record is 15–4. They were NAIA national champions in 1941.

| Year | Round | Opponent | Result |
|---|---|---|---|
| 1939 | First round Second Round; Quarterfinals; Semifinals; National Championship | Northern State; East Texas State; Manchester; Peru State; Southwestern (KS) | W 49–25; W 41–36; W 49–41; W 49–39; L 31–32 |
| 1940 | First round Second Round; Quarterfinals; Semifinals; National Championship | East Central State (OK); Appalachian State; Pittsburg State; Delta State; Tarkio | W 36–35; W 48–46; W 32–30; W 30–28; L 42–52 |
| 1941 | First round Second Round; Quarterfinals; Semifinals; National Championship | Western Montana; Culver–Stockton; Texas Western; West Texas State; Murray State | W 46–29; W 46–41 ^{OT} W 44–42; W 43–40; W 36–34 |
| 1942 | First round Second Round | Chadron State; Bemidji State | W 36–29; L 32–41 |
| 1956 | First round Second Round | Alderson Broaddus; Gustavus Adolphus | W 77–64; L 60–69 |

== Retired numbers ==
On January 16, 2020, the Aztecs announced that they would be retiring former small forward Kawhi Leonard's number 15 jersey on February 1, 2020. Following Leonard's jersey retirement, some confusion circulated regarding statements that Leonard was the first player in Aztecs history to have his jersey retired, as the school ceremoniously retired former power forward and center Michael Cage's number 44 jersey in 1984.

On December 29, 2023, the Aztecs announced that they would be retiring three more jerseys in a "Return to the Rafters" ceremony on January 17, 2024. The players honored were Milton "Milky" Phelps, Judy Porter, and Michael Cage. This ceremony resolved the prior confusion regarding Cage's jersey retirement.

San Diego State Aztecs retired numbers
| No. | Player | Pos. | Career | Year ret. | Ref. |
| 15 | Kawhi Leonard | SF | 2009–2011 | 2020 | |
| 22 | Milton Phelps | C/PF | 1937-1941 | 2024 | |
| 44 | Michael Cage | C/PF | 1980–1984 | 2024 | |

== Team records ==
=== All-time record vs. current MWC teams ===
Official record (including any NCAA imposed vacates and forfeits) against all current MWC opponents as of the completion of the 2022–2023 season:

| Opponent | Games played | Won | Lost | Percentage | Streak | First Meeting |
|---|---|---|---|---|---|---|
| Air Force | 88 | 64 | 24 | .727 | Won 8 | 1973–74 |
| Boise State | 29 | 18 | 11 | .621 | Lost 1 | 1976–77 |
| Colorado State | 94 | 51 | 43 | .543 | Won 4 | 1961–62 |
| Fresno State | 126 | 70 | 56 | .556 | Won 8 | 1939–40 |
| Nevada | 32 | 25 | 7 | .781 | Lost 1 | 1956–57 |
| New Mexico | 93 | 44 | 49 | .473 | Won 1 | 1975–76 |
| San Jose State | 82 | 47 | 35 | .573 | Won 11 | 1936–37 |
| UNLV | 80 | 43 | 37 | .538 | Won 6 | 1965–66 |
| Utah State | 26 | 18 | 9 | .692 | Won 4 | 1962–63 |
| Wyoming | 91 | 50 | 41 | .549 | Won 10 | 1978–79 |
| Totals | 741 | 430 | 311 | .580 | | |

Through March 14th, 2023.

=== Career leaders (DI era) ===
As of the 2022-23 Media Guide

Career Scoring Leaders
| Seasons | Player | Points |
|---|---|---|
| 2004–07 | Brandon Heath | 2,189 |
| 1981–84 | Michael Cage | 1,846 |
| 1983–86 | Anthony Watson | 1,735 |
| 2009–13 | Chase Tapley | 1,526 |
| 2017-21 | Matt Mitchell | 1,471 |
| 2015–18 | Trey Kell | 1,403 |
| 2012–16 | Winston Shepard | 1,403 |
| 2016–19 | Jeremy Hemsley | 1,392 |
| 1973–76 | Steve Copp | 1,307 |
| 2008–11 | Billy White | 1,294 |

Career Rebound Leaders
| Seasons | Player | Rebounds |
|---|---|---|
| 1981–84 | Michael Cage | 1317 |
| 2018-23 | Nathan Mensah | 899 |
| 2004–06 | Marcus Slaughter | 775 |
| 1973–76 | Steve Copp | 737 |
| 1982–85 | Leonard Allen | 724 |
| 2009–11 | Kawhi Leonard | 716 |
| 1974, 1976–79 | Joel Kramer | 711 |
| 2012–16 | Winston Shepard | 708 |
| 2000–04 | Aerick Sanders | 686 |
| 2013–16 | Skylar Spencer | 652 |

Career Assist Leaders
| Seasons | Player | Assists |
|---|---|---|
| 1978–81 | Tony Gwynn | 590 |
| 2006–09 | Richie Williams | 479 |
| 1994–97 | Chad Nelson | 412 |
| 2004–07 | Brandon Heath | 394 |
| 1974–77 | Mark Delsman | 376 |
| 1983–86 | Anthony Watson | 356 |
| 1982–83 | Keith Smith | 349 |
| 2008–11 | D.J. Gay | 344 |
| 2001–03 | Deandre Moore | 339 |
| 2015–18 | Trey Kell | 320 |

Career Steals Leaders
| Seasons | Player | Steals |
|---|---|---|
| 2006–09 | Richie Williams | 246 |
| 2004–07 | Brandon Heath | 217 |
| 1983–86 | Anthony Watson | 192 |
| 2009–13 | Chase Tapley | 197 |
| 1994–97 | Chad Nelson | 175 |
| 2007–11 | Billy White | 149 |
| 1978–81 | Tony Gwynn | 141 |
| 2006–09 | Kyle Spain | 137 |
| 1980–83 | Eddie Morris | 131 |
| 2017–21 | Matt Mitchell | 129 |

Career Games played Leaders
| Seasons | Player | Games |
|---|---|---|
| 2018-23 | Adam Seiko | 154 |
| 2018-23 | Nathan Mensah | 146 |
| 2012–16 | Skylar Spencer | 144 |
| 2007–11 | D.J. Gay | 140 |
| 2012–16 | Winston Shepard | 139 |
| 2018-23 | Aguek Arop | 135 |
| 2016–19 | Jeremy Hemsley | 134 |
| 2015–18 | Trey Kell | 134 |
| 2009–13 | Chase Tapley | 134 |
| 2007–11 | Billy White | 134 |

Career Minutes played Leaders
| Seasons | Player | Minutes |
|---|---|---|
| 2004–07 | Brandon Heath | 4,275 |
| 1981–84 | Michael Cage | 4,262 |
| 2007–11 | D.J. Gay | 4,222 |
| 2009–13 | Chase Tapley | 3,813 |
| 2006–09 | Richie Williams | 3,780 |
| 1994–97 | Chad Nelson | 3,692 |
| 2015–18 | Trey Kell | 3,640 |
| 2016–19 | Jeremy Hemsley | 3,632 |
| 2012–16 | Winston Shepard | 3,583 |
| 2007–11 | Billy White | 3,532 |

Career Blocks Leaders
| Seasons | Player | Blocks |
|---|---|---|
| 2012–16 | Skylar Spencer | 303 |
| 2018–23 | Nathan Mensah | 235 |
| 1982–85 | Leonard Allen | 214 |
| 2009–11 | Malcolm Thomas | 127 |
| 1981–84 | Michael Cage | 118 |
| 1991–93 | Joe McNaull | 114 |
| 2015–18 | Malik Pope | 113 |
| 2000–04 | Aerick Sanders | 105 |
| 2007–11 | Billy White | 102 |
| 1997-01 | Marcelo Correa | 100 |

Career Wins Leaders
| Seasons | Player | Wins |
|---|---|---|
| 2018–23 | Adam Seiko | 120 |
| 2018–23 | Nathan Mensah | 112 |
| 2012–16 | Skylar Spencer | 109 |
| 2007–11 | D.J. Gay | 105 |
| 2012-16 | Winston Shepard | 104 |
| 2009–13 | Chase Tapley | 103 |
| 2018-23 | Aguek Arop | 102 |
| 2007–11 | Billy White | 101 |
| 2013–17 | Dakarai Allen | 99 |
| 2017–21 | Matt Mitchell | 96 |

=== Single season leaders (DI era) ===
(*) Lead conference

Season Scoring Leaders
| Season | Player | Points | PPG |
|---|---|---|---|
| 1983–84 | Michael Cage | 686 | 24.5 |
| 2006–07 | Brandon Heath | 637 | 19.3 |
| 2013–14 | Xavier Thames | 633 | 17.5 |
| 1985–86 | Anthony Watson | 630* | 22.5 |
| 2005–06 | Brandon Heath | 607* | 18.4 |
| 2019–20 | Malachi Flynn | 564 | 17.6 |
| 2012–13 | Jamaal Franklin | 560 | 17.0 |
| 2001–02 | Randy Holcomb | 558 | 16.9 |
| 2011–12 | Jamaal Franklin | 557 | 17.4 |
| 2010–11 | Kawhi Leonard | 557 | 15.5 |

Season Rebound Leaders
| Season | Player | Rebounds | RPG |
|---|---|---|---|
| 2010–11 | Kawhi Leonard | 380* | 10.6 |
| 1980–81 | Michael Cage | 355* | 13.1 |
| 1982–83 | Michael Cage | 354* | 12.6 |
| 1983–84 | Michael Cage | 352* | 12.6 |
| 1971–72 | Chris McMurray | 350 | 12.5 |
| 2013–14 | Josh Davis | 342 | 10 |
| 2009–10 | Kawhi Leonard | 336* | 9.9 |
| 2005–06 | Marcus Slaughter | 329* | 11 |
| 2012–13 | Jamaal Franklin | 312 | 9.4 |
| 2010–11 | Malcom Thomas | 301 | 8.1 |

Season Assists Leaders
| Season | Player | Assists | APG |
|---|---|---|---|
| 1979–80 | Tony Gwynn | 221* | 8.2 |
| 1981–82 | Keith Smith | 212* | 7.3 |
| 1977–78 | Dean Decker | 176 | 6.3 |
| 2003–04 | Wesley Stokes | 175 | 5.8 |
| 1984–85 | Creon Dorsey | 171* | 5.5 |
| 1980–81 | Tony Gwynn | 164 | 6.3 |
| 1975–76 | Ray Leary | 163 | 5.6 |
| 2019–20 | Malachi Flynn | 163 | 5.1 |
| 1978–79 | Tony Gwynn | 153* | 5.7 |
| 2006–07 | Richie Williams | 151 | 4.6 |

Season Steals Leaders
| Season | Player | Steals | SPG |
|---|---|---|---|
| 2008–09 | Richie Williams | 77* | 2.1 |
| 1984–85 | Anthony Watson | 74 | 2.4 |
| 2006–07 | Richie Williams | 69* | 2.1 |
| 1998–99 | Matt Watts | 65* | 2.6 |
| 1989–90 | Michael Best | 65 | 2.2 |
| 2006–07 | Brandon Heath | 64 | 1.9 |
| 2004–05 | Brandon Heath | 63* | 2.2 |
| 1995–96 | Raymond King | 63 | 2.2 |
| 1984–85 | Creon Dorsey | 63 | 2.0 |
| 2006–07 | Lorrenzo Wade | 62 | 1.9 |

Season Blocks Leaders
| Season | Player | Blocks |
|---|---|---|
| 2014–15 | Skylar Spencer | 91 |
| 2013–14 | Skylar Spencer | 89 |
| 1984–85 | Leonard Allen | 82 |
| 2010–11 | Malcolm Thomas | 75 |
| 2015–16 | Skylar Spencer | 72 |
| 2021-22 | Nathan Mensah | 71 |
| 2022-23 | Nathan Mensah | 64 |
| 2016–17 | Valentine Izundu | 53 |
| 2009–10 | Malcolm Thomas | 52* |
| 2012–13 | Skylar Spencer | 51 |

=== Single game leaders (DI era) ===
Most Points in a game
| Date | Player | Points | Opponent |
|---|---|---|---|
| February 20, 1986 | Anthony Watson | 54 | USIU |
| March 3, 1979 | Kim Goetz | 44 | Utah |
| February 9, 1979 | Kim Goetz | 42 | Colorado State |
| February 5, 1980 | Eddie Morris | 41 | UNLV |
| February 6, 1984 | Michael Cage | 40 | Wyoming |

Most Rebounds in a game
| Date | Player | Rebounds | Opponent |
|---|---|---|---|
| December 29, 1980 | Michael Cage | 26 | LaSalle |
| February 24, 1979 | Steve Malovic | 23 | New Mexico State |
| December 21, 1971 | Chris McMurray | 23 | Chapman University |
| March 13, 2010 | Kawhi Leonard | 21 | UNLV |
| February 6, 1984 | Michael Cage | 21 | Wyoming |

Most Assists in a game
| Date | Player | Assists | Opponent |
|---|---|---|---|
| February 5, 1980 | Tony Gwynn | 18 | UNLV |
| March 7, 1981 | Tony Gwynn | 16 | New Mexico State |
| February 14, 1980 | Tony Gwynn | 14 | New Mexico State |
| December 11, 1976 | Dean Decker | 14 | UNLV |
| February 12, 1985 | Creon Doresy | 13 | LBSU |

- All stats are from the and are updated through the 2022–2023 basketball season.

== Notable former players ==
Several former Aztec men's basketball players have gone on to play in the NBA, play in other professional basketball leagues, or achieve significant notability outside of basketball.

National Basketball Association (NBA)
| Player | Position | NBA Debut | Team (s) |
|---|---|---|---|
| Joel Kramer | SF | 1979 | Phoenix Suns |
| Steve Malovic | PF | 1980 | Washington Bullets, San Diego Clippers, Detroit Pistons |
| Rock Lee | C | 1982 | San Diego Clippers |
| Michael Cage | PF/C | 1985 | Los Angeles Clippers, Seattle SuperSonics, Cleveland Cavaliers, Philadelphia 76ers, New Jersey Nets |
| Keshad Johnson | SF | 2024 | Miami Heat |
| Steffond Johnson | PF | 1987 | Los Angeles Clippers |
| Randy Holcomb | SF | 2006 | Chicago Bulls |
| Kawhi Leonard | SF | 2012 | San Antonio Spurs, Toronto Raptors, Los Angeles Clippers |
| Malcolm Thomas | PF | 2012 | San Antonio Spurs, Golden State Warriors, Chicago Bulls, Utah Jazz, Philadelphia 76ers |
| Jamaal Franklin | SG | 2014 | Memphis Grizzlies, Denver Nuggets |
| J. J. O'Brien | SF | 2016 | Utah Jazz |
| Zylan Cheatham | PF | 2019 | New Orleans Pelicans |
| Jalen McDaniels | SF | 2019 | Charlotte Hornets, Philadelphia 76ers, Toronto Raptors |
| Malachi Flynn | PG | 2020 | Toronto Raptors, New York Knicks, Detroit Pistons |
| Jordan Schakel | SG/SF | 2021 | Washington Wizards |
| Marcus Slaughter | C | 2007 | Miami Heat |
| Nathan Mensah | C | 2023 | Charlotte Hornets |

Overseas Professional Leagues
| Player | Position | League | Team (s) |
|---|---|---|---|
| Brandon Heath | G | NBL (Bulgaria) | BC Levski Sofia |
| Hubert Roberts | C | Ligat HaAl (Israel) | Hapoel Haifa, Hapoel Jerusalem, Maccabi Haifa, Rishon LeZion |
| Jamaal Franklin | SG | CBA (China) | Zhejiang Lions |
| Yanni Wetzell | PF/C | NBL (Australia) | South East Melbourne Phoenix, New Zealand Breakers |
| Billy White | PF | NBL (Canada) | Halifax Hurricanes, Moncton Magic, Windsor Express |
| Xavier Thames | G | LKL (Lithuania) | BC Jonava |

Other sports
| Player | Known for | Team (s) |
|---|---|---|
| Tony Gwynn | Baseball Hall of Fame outfielder | San Diego Padres (MLB) |
| Tony Clark | Baseball first baseman and MLBPA union leader | Detroit Tigers, Boston Red Sox, New York Mets, New York Yankees, Arizona Diamondbacks, San Diego Padres (MLB) |
| Graig Nettles | Baseball Third baseman;MVP (1981), AL Home run leader (1976), x2 Gold Glove Award (1977, 1978) x6 All-Star | Minnesota Twins, Cleveland Indians, New York Yankees, San Diego Padres, Atlanta Braves, Montreal Expos (MLB) |

Media
| Player | Known for | Appearances |
|---|---|---|
| Art Linkletter | Television personality | Host of House Party; Host of People are Funny |
| Chris Marlowe | Sports commentator | Denver Nuggets play-by-play commentator |

=== NBA draft selections ===
There have been 25 former San Diego State players selected in the NBA draft:

- Malachi Flynn - 2020, Round 1, Pick 29, Toronto Raptors
- Jalen McDaniels - 2019, Round 2, Pick 52, Charlotte Hornets
- Xavier Thames - 2014, Round 2, Pick 59, Toronto Raptors
- Jamaal Franklin - 2013, Round 2, Pick 41, Memphis Grizzlies
- Kawhi Leonard - 2011, Round 1, Pick 15, Indiana Pacers
- Randy Holcomb – 2002, Round 2, Pick 57, San Antonio Spurs
- Anthony Watson – 1986, Round 4, Pick 87, Denver Nuggets
- Steffond Johnson – 1986, Round 5, Pick 100, Los Angeles Clippers
- Leonard Allen – 1985, Round 3, Pick 50, Dallas Mavericks
- Michael Cage – 1984, Round 1, Pick 14, Los Angeles Clippers
- Keith Smith – 1983, Round 10, Pick 209, San Diego Clippers
- Tony Gwynn - 1981, Round 10, Pick 207, San Diego Clippers
- Kim Goetz - 1979, Round 8, Pick 158, New York Knicks
- Mike Dodd – 1976, Round 9, Pick 176, San Diego Clippers
- Joel Kramer - 1978, Round 3, Pick 63, Phoenix Suns
- Steve Malovic - 1978, Round 6, Pick 130, Phoenix Suns
- Steve Copp – 1976, Round 3, Pick 42, Golden State Warriors
- Bob Kovach – 1976, Round 9, Pick 142, Atlanta Hawks
- Ken Smith – 1976, Round 10, Pick 173, Golden State Warriors
- Chris McMurray – 1973, Round 12, Pick 178, Cleveland Cavaliers
- Jimmy Wilkins – 1972, Round 11, Pick 157, Portland Trail Blazers
- Gary Schneider – 1971, Round 19, Pick 236, San Diego Rockets
- Bernie Finlay – 1960, Round 9, Pick 67, Syracuse Nationals
- Bob Brady – 1954, Round 7, Pick 54, Philadelphia Warriors
- Dick Barnes – 1950, Round 5, Pick 52, New York Knicks

== See also ==
- San Diego Hall of Champions
- Breitbard Hall of Fame
- San Diego sports curse
- Basketball in the United States
- College basketball
