= Steffond Johnson =

American basketball player (born 1962)

Personal information
- Born: November 4, 1962 (age 64) Longview, Texas
- Listed height: 6 ft 8 in (2.03 m)
- Listed weight: 240 lb (109 kg)

Career information
- High school: Longview (Longview, Texas)
- College: LSU (1981–1984); San Diego State (1985–1986)
- NBA draft: 1986: 5th round, 100th overall pick
- Drafted by: Los Angeles Clippers
- Playing career: 1986–1995
- Position: Power forward
- Number: 31

Career history
- 1986–1987: Los Angeles Clippers
- 1987–1988: Rochester Flyers
- 1987–1988: Wyoming Wildcatters
- 1989–1990: Santa Barbara Islanders
- 1990–1991: San Jose Jammers
- 1992–1993: Wichita Falls Texans
- 1993: Oklahoma City Cavalry
- 1993–1995: Tri-City Chinook
- Stats at NBA.com
- Stats at Basketball Reference

Steffond O'Shea Johnson (born November 4, 1962) is a retired American basketball player. He was a 6'8" 240 lb. forward and played one season in the NBA for the Los Angeles Clippers, by whom he was selected in the 1986 NBA draft (5th round, 100th pick overall).

Johnson played competitively at Longview High School, and college basketball at Louisiana State University and San Diego State University.

After his short NBA career, Johnson played in the CBA for six seasons. He averaged 12 points and 5.1 rebounds per game. He also played professionally in Turkey, Cyprus, Uruguay, Italy, Venezuela, Philippines (Red Bull) and Puerto Rico.

== Career statistics ==
Legend
| GP | Games played | GS | Games started | MPG | Minutes per game |
| FG% | Field goal percentage | 3P% | 3-point field goal percentage | FT% | Free throw percentage |
| RPG | Rebounds per game | APG | Assists per game | SPG | Steals per game |
| BPG | Blocks per game | PPG | Points per game | **Bold** | Career high |

=== NBA ===
==== Regular season ====
| Year | Team | GP | GS | MPG | FG% | 3P% | FT% | RPG | APG | SPG | BPG | PPG |
|---|---|---|---|---|---|---|---|---|---|---|---|---|
| 1986–87 | L.A. Clippers | 29 | 0 | 8.1 | .422 | .000 | .526 | 1.5 | .2 | .3 | .1 | 2.6 |
