= Malik Pope =

American basketball player (born 1996)

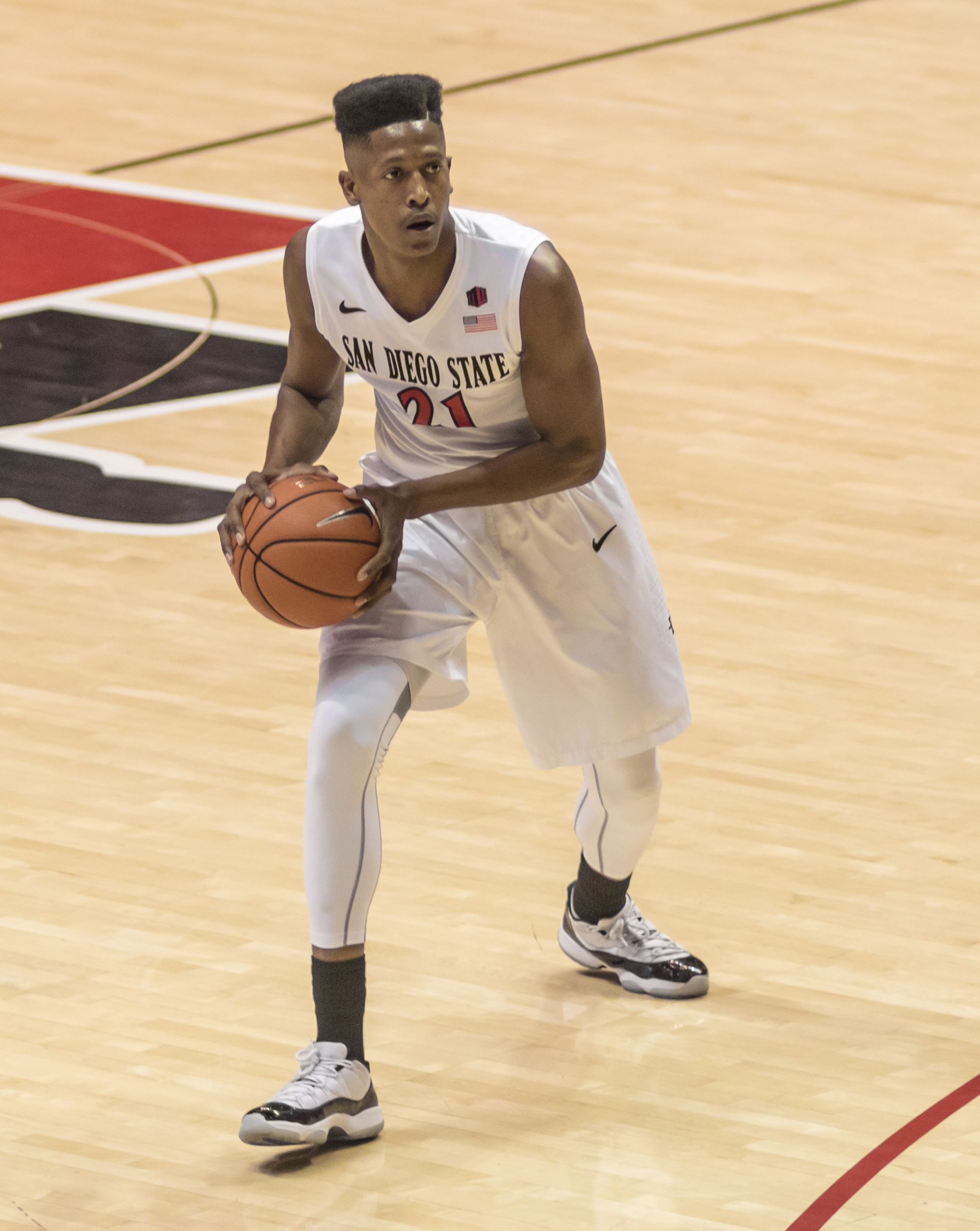
- Pope in 2014

Free agent
- Position: Power forward

Personal information
- Born: July 25, 1996 (age 30)
- Listed height: 6 ft 10 in (2.08 m)
- Listed weight: 215 lb (98 kg)

Career information
- High school: Laguna Creek (Sacramento, California)
- College: San Diego State (2014–2018)
- NBA draft: 2018: undrafted
- Playing career: 2018–present

Career history
- 2018–2019: PAOK
- 2019: Greensboro Swarm
- 2019: Rostock Seawolves
- 2021: Austin Spurs
- 2021: Soles de Santo Domingo Este
- 2021: NBA G League Ignite
- 2022: Delaware Blue Coats
- 2023: Caribbean Storm Islands
- 2023: Sporting CP
- 2023–2024: Rapla KK
- 2024: GBA Lions Jindrichuv Hradec
- 2025: San Miguel Beermen

Career highlights
- Second-team All-Mountain West (2018)

Malik Xavier Pope (born July 25, 1996) is an American professional basketball player who last played for the San Miguel Beermen of the Philippine Basketball Association (PBA). He played college basketball for the San Diego State Aztecs.

== Early life ==
Pope is a native of Sacramento and played for Laguna Creek High School He measured 6'3 as a high school sophomore and 6'8 as a junior, crediting his growth spurt in part to drinking more milk. In 2012, while doing some drills, Pope broke his left leg. Several months later, he broke it again and tore his meniscus, causing him to miss his entire senior season of high school. Even so, he was a 5 star recruit in the class of 2014 who committed and played for San Diego State.

== College career ==
Pope had a career high 22 points and seven rebounds in a game against Colorado State as a freshman, sending his name up NBA Draft boards. As a sophomore at San Diego State, he averaged 7.3 points and 5.0 rebounds per game. He increased those numbers to 12.3 points and 7.3 rebounds per game in March 2016 as he led the Aztecs to the NIT finals. Following the season he declared for the 2016 NBA draft but did not hire an agent.

Pope had an injury-riddled junior campaign and missed nine games. He went on to average 11 points per game. As a senior, Pope was named to the Second Team All-Mountain West Conference. He was suspended on February 23, 2018, for allegedly receiving a $1,400 loan from an agent, according to an FBI investigation. Pope was cleared to return to the team on February 28. He averaged 12.9 points, 6.6 rebounds and 1.1 blocked shots per game, shooting 52.1 percent from the floor and 36.8 percent from 3-point range. Pope led San Diego State to an NCAA tournament berth as an 11 seed after winning the conference tournament.

== Professional career ==
=== PAOK (2018–2019) ===
After going undrafted in the 2018 NBA draft, Pope joined the Los Angeles Lakers in the 2018 NBA Summer League. On August 10, 2018, Pope officially started his professional career by signing with Greek team PAOK.

=== Greensboro Swarm (2019) ===
On January 13, 2019, Pope signed with the Greensboro Swarm of the NBA G League. He averaged 6.7 points, 4.5 rebounds and 0.6 blocks per game.

=== Rostock Seawolves (2019) ===
Pope joined the Rostock Seawolves of the German ProA league in August 2019. In 13 games, he averaged 7.8 points, 4.4 rebounds and 0.9 blocks per game. In December 2019, Pope left the Seawolves.

=== Austin Spurs (2021) ===
On February 13, 2021, the Austin Spurs announced that they had acquired Pope from available pool of players, but was later waived by the Austin Spurs on February 21 after appearing in two games.

=== NBA G League Ignite (2021) ===
On October 28, 2021, Pope signed with the NBA G League Ignite.

On December 24, Pope signed with the Wisconsin Herd of the NBA G League, but was later waived on January 4, 2022.

=== Delaware Blue Coats (2022) ===
On January 7, 2022, Pope was acquired via available player pool by the Delaware Blue Coats. On January 9, 2022, Pope was waived by the Delaware Blue Coats.

=== Caribbean Storm Islands (2023) ===
On April 18, 2023, Pope signed with the Caribbean Storm Islands of the Colombian League.

=== San Miguel Beermen (2025) ===
On January 17, 2025, Pope signed with the San Miguel Beermen of the Philippine Basketball Association (PBA) to replace Jabari Narcis as the team's import for the 2024–25 PBA Commissioner's Cup and the 2024–25 East Asia Super League.
