= Chase Tapley =

American professional basketball player (born 1991)

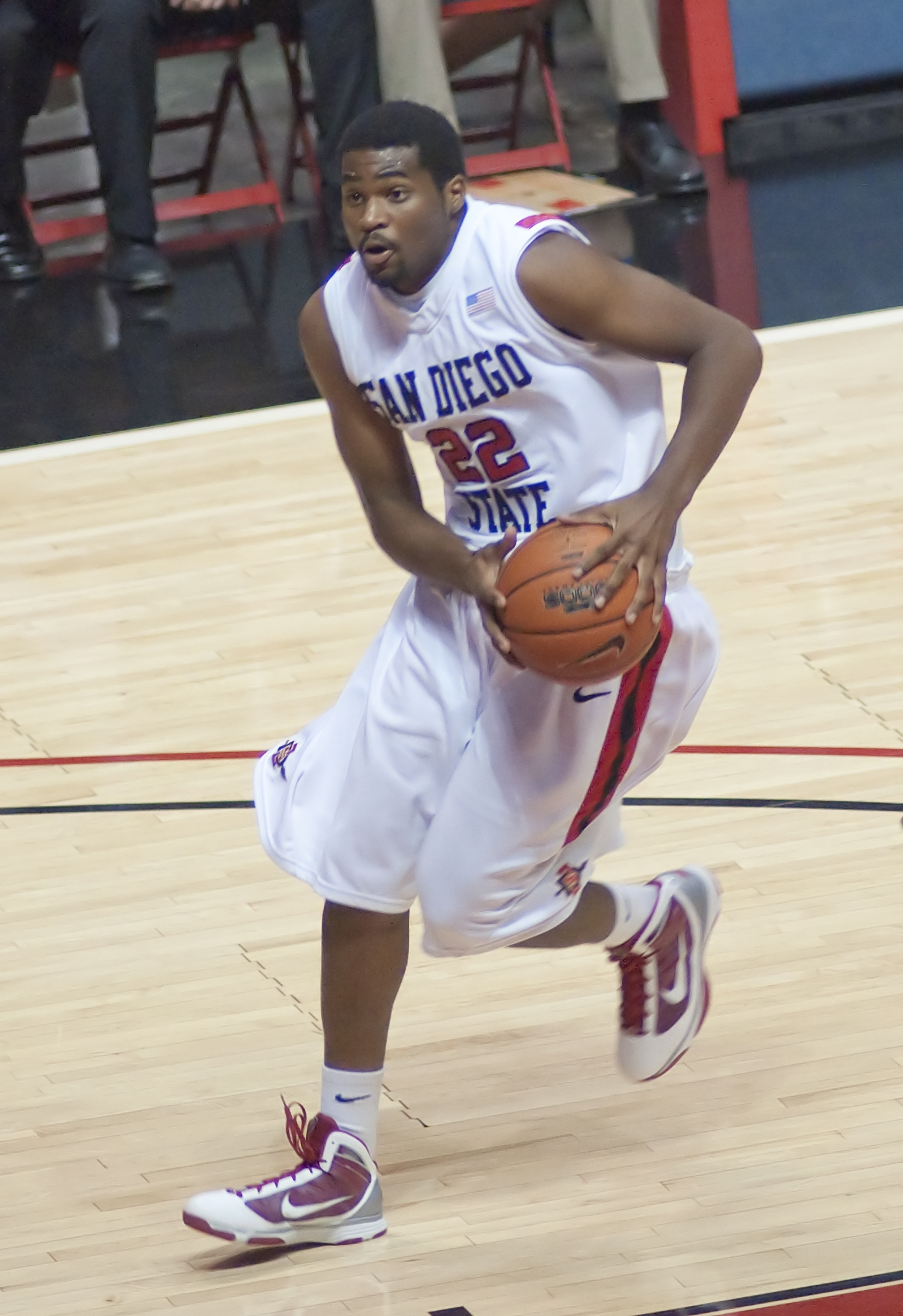
- Tapley in 2009

Personal information
- Born: June 3, 1991 (age 35) Sacramento, California
- Listed height: 6 ft 3 in (1.91 m)
- Listed weight: 195 lb (88 kg)

Career information
- High school: Sacramento (Sacramento, California)
- College: San Diego State (2009–2013)
- NBA draft: 2013: undrafted
- Playing career: 2013–2014
- Position: Shooting guard

Career history
- 2013: Hebraica y Macabi
- 2013–2014: Tulsa 66ers

Career highlights
- Second-team All-MWC (2012); Third-team All-MWC (2013)

Alexander Chase Tapley (born June 3, 1991) is an American professional basketball player who last played for the Tulsa 66ers of the NBA Development League. He played college basketball for the San Diego State University.

== High school career ==
Tapley attended Sacramento Charter High School in Sacramento, California. As a junior, he averaged 22.2 points, 4.8 assists and 4.6 steals per game. As a senior, he averaged 23.2 points. His team was 27–7 that year, and reached the Northern California state finals.

== College career ==
Tapley played for the San Diego State Aztecs, averaging 11.4 points, 3.1 rebounds, and 2.3 assists in 134 games in his four years at the college.

=== College statistics ===
Year	Team	GP	GS	MPG	FG%	3P%	FT%	RPG	APG	SPG	BPG	PPG
2009–10	San Diego State	33	17	23.4	.500	.376	.714	2.30	2.2	1.1	.4	7.6
2010–11	San Diego State	34	31	25.5	.485	.380	.828	2.4	1.9	1.3	.2	8.6
2011–12	San Diego State	34	34	34.0	.455	.433	.723	4.3	2.3	1.8	.4	15.8
2012–13	San Diego State	33	32	30.8	.429	.376	.803	3.2	2.7	1.4	.5	13.5
Career		134	114	28.5	.460	.395	.762	3.1	2.3	1.4	.4	11.4

== Professional career ==
After going undrafted in the 2013 NBA draft, Tapley played two games for Hebraica y Macabi of Uruguay in September 2013. On November 1, 2013, he was selected in the second round of the 2013 NBA D-League draft by the Tulsa 66ers.

On November 4, 2014, Tapley was acquired by the Oklahoma City Blue. He was later waived by Oklahoma City on November 13, 2014.

== NBA D-League career statistics ==
Legend
GP	Games played	GS	Games started	MPG	Minutes per game
FG%	Field goal percentage	3P%	3-point field goal percentage	FT%	Free throw percentage
RPG	Rebounds per game	APG	Assists per game	SPG	Steals per game
BPG	Blocks per game	PPG	Points per game	**Bold**	Career high

=== Regular season ===
Year	Team	GP	GS	MPG	FG%	3P%	FT%	RPG	APG	SPG	BPG	PPG
2013–14	Tulsa 66ers	12	0	14.9	.467	.286	.667	1.2	.9	.8	.1	5.5
Career		12	0	14.9	.467	.286	.667	1.2	.9	.8	.1	5.5
