= Richard Williams (Australian rules footballer) =

Australian rules footballer

Personal information
- Full name: Richard Leslie Williams
- Born: 6 May 1905; Kaniva, Victoria, Australia
- Died: 24 August 1958 (aged 53); El Paso, Texas, US
- Height: 175 cm (5 ft 9 in)
- Weight: 73 kg (161 lb)

Playing career^{1}
Years	Club	Games (Goals)
1929	Hawthorn	1 (0)
- ^{1} Playing statistics correct to the end of 1929.

Richard Leslie Williams (6 May 1905 – 24 August 1958) was an Australian rules footballer who played with Hawthorn in the Victorian Football League (VFL).

He played a single game for Hawthorn in 1929, playing in the same side as his brother Lyall Williams.
