= Joel Kramer =

American basketball player (born 1955)

Personal information
- Born: November 30, 1955 (age 70) San Diego, California, U. S.
- Listed height: 6 ft 7 in (2.01 m)
- Listed weight: 203 lb (92 kg)

Career information
- High school: Patrick Henry (San Diego, California)
- College: San Diego State (1974–1978)
- NBA draft: 1978: 3rd round, 63rd overall pick
- Drafted by: Phoenix Suns
- Playing career: 1978–1984
- Position: Power forward / center
- Number: 50

Career history
- 1978–1983: Phoenix Suns
- 1983–1984: Maccabi Tel Aviv

Career highlights
- PCAA Player of the Year (1978); 2× First-team All-PCAA (1977, 1978)

Career NBA statistics
- Points: 1,257 (3.8 ppg)
- Rebounds: 916 (2.8 rpg)
- Assists: 343 (1.0 apg)
- Stats at NBA.com
- Stats at Basketball Reference

Joel Bruce Kramer (born November 30, 1955) is an American former professional basketball player. Listed at 6 feet 7 inches (2.01 m) and 203 pounds (92 kg), he played the power forward and center positions. After playing college basketball at San Diego State University, he had a five-season career in the National Basketball Association (NBA) from 1978–1983 with the Phoenix Suns.

== Early life ==
Kramer was born in San Diego, California, and is Jewish. He attended Patrick Henry High School in San Diego. There, he played for the basketball team and was League Player of the Year and All-California Interscholastic Federation his senior season.

== Basketball career ==
Kramer played college basketball on a basketball scholarship at San Diego State University, during which he averaged 9.6 points and 7.2 rebounds per game, while shooting .521 from the field. After recovering from a broken foot, he averaged over 9 rebounds per game his last two seasons. In 1977–78, he set a school consecutive free throw record of 33. As a senior, he was named 1978 Pacific Coast Athletic Association Player of the Year.

He played basketball for Team USA at the 1977 Maccabiah Games, winning a gold medal.

Kramer was selected with the 19th pick of the third round by the Phoenix Suns in the 1978 NBA draft. He had a five-year career in the National Basketball Association (NBA) from 1978–1983, primarily at center and power forward. In his rookie season, he played in 82 games, tying for the NBA lead, and in 1980–81 he was third in the NBA with 82 games played.

After playing for the Suns, Kramer continued his playing career in Israel with Maccabi Tel Aviv, for whom he played for just a few months after signing for a reported $100,000 a year. He was released in January 1984.

== Post-playing career ==
Kramer was inducted into the Southern California Jewish Sports Hall of Fame in 1993. He was inducted into the San Diego Aztecs Hall of Fame in 1997.

Kramer has held executive roles with CBIZ, an American accounting and financial services firm, working as the managing director of the Phoenix office's tax division as of October 2022.

== Career statistics ==
Legend
GP	Games played	GS	Games started	MPG	Minutes per game
FG%	Field goal percentage	3P%	3-point field goal percentage	FT%	Free throw percentage
RPG	Rebounds per game	APG	Assists per game	SPG	Steals per game
BPG	Blocks per game	PPG	Points per game	**Bold**	Career high
*	Led the league

=== NBA ===
==== Regular season ====
Year	Team	GP	GS	MPG	FG%	3P%	FT%	RPG	APG	SPG	BPG	PPG
1978–79	Phoenix	**82***		**17.1**	.489		.710	**4.1**	1.1	**.5**	**.3**	**5.9**
1979–80	Phoenix	54		13.2	.469	.000	.800	2.8	**1.4**	**.5**	.1	3.5
1980–81	Phoenix	**82**		13.0	**.527**	.000	.692	2.8	1.1	.4	.2	4.1
1981–82	Phoenix	56	0	9.8	.414	–	.786	1.9	.9	.3	.2	2.6
1982–83	Phoenix	54	4	8.5	.423	.000	**.875**	1.6	.7	.3	.1	1.9
Career		328	4	12.8	.479	.000	.737	2.8	1.0	.4	.2	3.8

==== Playoffs ====
Year	Team	GP	MPG	FG%	3P%	FT%	RPG	APG	SPG	BPG	PPG
1979	Phoenix	**15**	**17.1**	.542		**.722**	**3.8**	**1.3**	**.6**	**.5**	**6.0**
1981	Phoenix	7	14.4	.520	–	.500	2.3	.6	.3	.3	3.9
1982	Phoenix	4	5.0	**.714**	–	.667	1.3	.3	.3	.0	3.0
1983	Phoenix	2	3.0	.000	–	–	.0	.0	.0	.0	.0
Career		28	13.7	.538	–	.707	2.8	.9	.4	.3	4.6

== See also ==
- List of select Jewish basketball players
