= Nathan Mensah =

Ghanaian basketball player (born 1998)

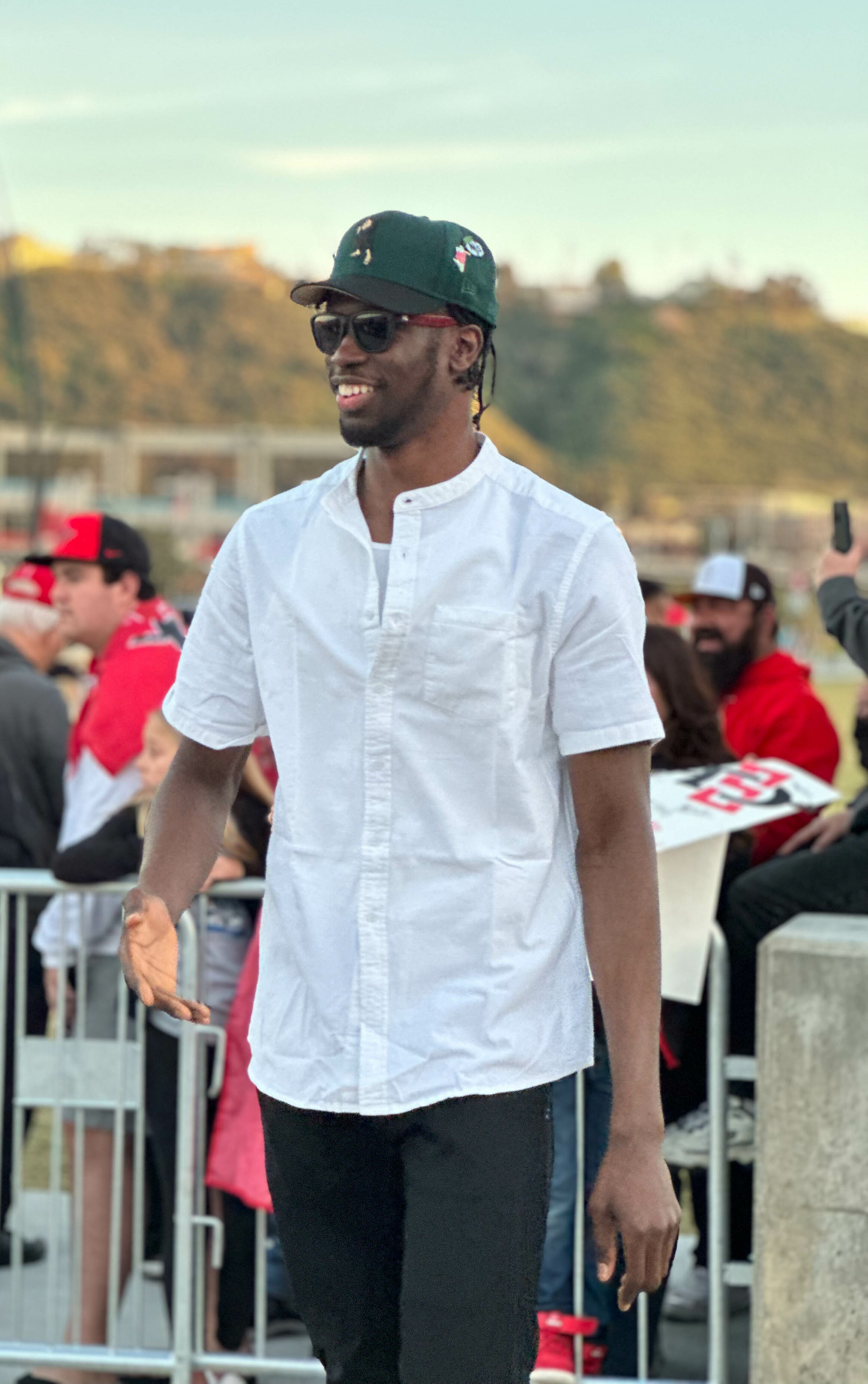
- Mensah in April 2023

No. 16 – San Diego Clippers
- Position: Center
- League: NBA G League

Personal information
- Born: 9 April 1998 (age 28) Accra, Ghana
- Listed height: 6 ft 10 in (2.08 m)
- Listed weight: 230 lb (104 kg)

Career information
- High school: Prolific Prep (Napa, California); Findlay Prep (Henderson, Nevada)
- College: San Diego State (2018–2023)
- NBA draft: 2023: undrafted
- Playing career: 2023–present

Career history
- 2023: Greensboro Swarm
- 2023–2024: Charlotte Hornets
- 2023–2024: →Greensboro Swarm
- 2024: Austin Spurs
- 2024–2025: Olympiacos
- 2025–2026: U-BT Cluj-Napoca
- 2026: Büyükçekmece
- 2026–present: San Diego Clippers

Career highlights
- 2× Mountain West Defensive Player of the Year (2022, 2023); Third-team All-Mountain West (2023); 3× Mountain West All-Defensive Team (2021–2023)
- Stats at NBA.com
- Stats at Basketball Reference

Nathan Mensah (born 9 April 1998) is a Ghanaian professional basketball player for the San Diego Clippers of the NBA G League. Known for his 7-foot-5-inch (226 cm) wingspan, he played college basketball for the San Diego State Aztecs.

== High school career ==
Mensah grew up playing soccer in Ghana. At the age of 13, he began playing basketball after being recruited to play in a tournament. Mensah was spotted by Kwaku Amoaku and moved to the United States to attend Prolific Prep. In August 2017, he averaged 13.8 points and 7.4 rebounds per game for Team Africa in the Adidas Global Nations event. Mensah transferred to Findlay Prep before his senior season. Rated a four-star recruit, Mensah committed to playing college basketball for San Diego State in October 2017, choosing the Aztecs over Oregon, Oregon State, USC and Texas Tech.

== College career ==
As a freshman at San Diego State, Mensah averaged 5.6 points and 5.5 rebounds per game. On 28 December 2019, Mensah requested to be substituted during the second half of a game against Cal Poly, due to shortness of breath. He was diagnosed with a pulmonary embolism, forcing him to miss the remainder of the season. Mensah averaged 6.9 points and 6.8 rebounds per game as a sophomore. As a junior, he averaged 8.1 points and 6.1 rebounds per game. Mensah was named Mountain West Defensive Player of the Year as a senior as well as Honorable Mention All-Mountain West, and helped lead the Aztecs to their first Final Four and national championship game.

== Professional career ==
=== Charlotte Hornets / Greensboro Swarm (2023–2024) ===
After going undrafted in the 2023 NBA draft, Mensah joined the Charlotte Hornets for the 2023 NBA Summer League. On 5 September 2023, he signed with the Hornets, but was waived on 21 October, prior to the start of the season. Eight days later, he signed with the Greensboro Swarm of the NBA G League. On 14 December, he signed a two-way contract with the Hornets and the next day, he made his NBA debut in a 112–107 loss to the New Orleans Pelicans. On 2 March 2024, he was waived by the Hornets and two days later, he returned to Greensboro.

=== Austin Spurs (2024) ===
On 28 September 2024, Mensah signed with the San Antonio Spurs, but was waived on 13 October. On 29 October, he joined the Austin Spurs.

Mensah played his debut game with the Austin Spurs on November 8, 2024, in a 128 - 117 win over the Osceola Magic where he recorded 6 points, 8 rebounds, 1 assist and 2 blocks in 17 minutes. He would only play for 12 games during the Tip - Off Tournament, averaging 5.4 points ad 7.0 rebounds in 21.0 minutes per game. This statline greatly helped the Spurs as they had a 9 - 3 record in those 12 games.

However, Mensah would not stay with the Austin Spurs for their regular season as he would play his final game with them on December 10 against the Rio Grande Valley Vipers. The Spurs won the game 124 - 112 with Mensah recording 6 points, 5 rebounds and 2 blocks.

=== Olympiacos (2024–2025) ===
The day after his final game with the Austin Spurs on 11 December 2024, Mensah signed with Olympiacos of the Greek Basketball League, replacing the injured Moses Wright.

On 23 April 2025, Mensah was released from the Greek club. In 9 games, he averaged 3.9 points and 3.1 rebounds in 12 minutes of play.

=== Büyükçekmece Basketbol (2026) ===
On April 9, 2026, he signed with ONVO Büyükçekmece of the Basketbol Süper Ligi (BSL).

=== Petkim Spor (2026) ===
On July 27, 2026, he signed with Petkim Spor of the Basketbol Süper Ligi (BSL).

== Career statistics ==
Legend
GP	Games played	GS	Games started	MPG	Minutes per game
FG%	Field goal percentage	3P%	3-point field goal percentage	FT%	Free throw percentage
RPG	Rebounds per game	APG	Assists per game	SPG	Steals per game
BPG	Blocks per game	PPG	Points per game	**Bold**	Career high

=== NBA ===
Year	Team	GP	GS	MPG	FG%	3P%	FT%	RPG	APG	SPG	BPG	PPG
2023–24	Charlotte	25	0	12.3	.429	—	.750	2.6	.4	.2	.6	1.3
Career		25	0	12.3	.429	—	.750	2.6	.4	.2	.6	1.3

=== College ===
Year	Team	GP	GS	MPG	FG%	3P%	FT%	RPG	APG	SPG	BPG	PPG
2018–19	San Diego State	34	20	18.9	.541	–	**.708**	5.5	**.6**	.3	1.1	5.6
2019–20	San Diego State	13	13	20.2	**.617**	–	.640	6.8	.3	**.8**	1.7	6.9
2020–21	San Diego State	28	27	21.4	.579	.000	.600	6.1	**.6**	.6	1.4	**8.1**
2021–22	San Diego State	32	32	**24.8**	.482	.250	.533	**6.9**	**.6**	**.8**	**2.2**	7.0
2022–23	San Diego State	**39**	**38**	20.8	.521	**.500**	.648	5.9	**.6**	.7	1.6	6.0
Career		146	130	21.3	.539	.222	.622	6.2	.6	.6	1.6	6.6

== Personal life ==
Mensah is of the Christian faith.
