= The Georgia Gang =

The Georgia Gang is a long-running public affair program broadcast in Atlanta, Georgia. Dick Williams served as the host of the show for many years. The show features two panelists from the left and two from the right. Panelists have included Tharon Johnson, Alexis Scott and Janelle King. The show airs Sundays at 8:30 a.m. on Fox5.

Williams died in January 2022. He was married to journalist and mayor Rebecca Chase Williams.

The show was established as Sunday News Conference in the early 1980s on WSB-TV. Lori Geary succeeded Williams as the show’s host.
