= Michael Cage =

American basketball player (born 1962)

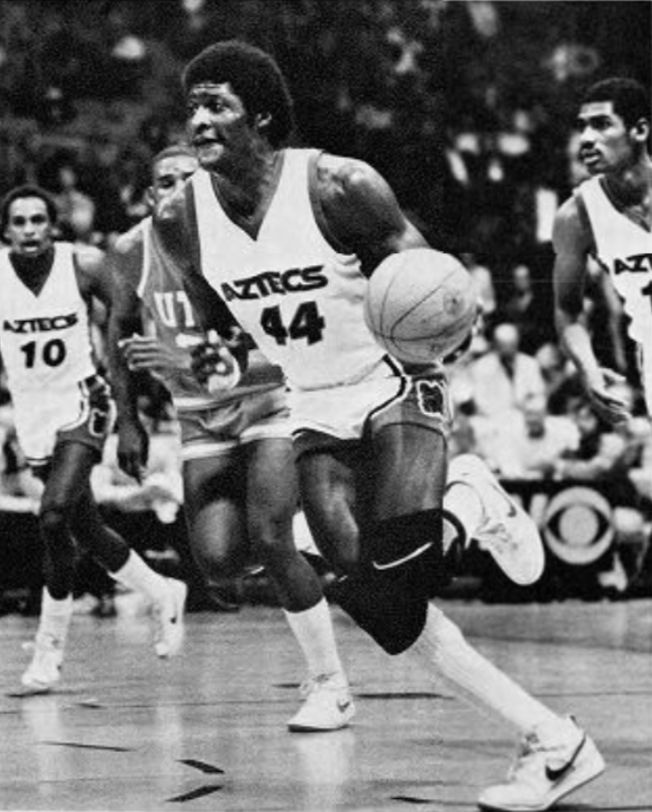
- Cage with the San Diego State Aztecs in 1982–83

Personal information
- Born: January 28, 1962 (age 64) West Memphis, Arkansas, U.S.
- Listed height: 6 ft 9 in (2.06 m)
- Listed weight: 224 lb (102 kg)

Career information
- High school: West Memphis (West Memphis, Arkansas)
- College: San Diego State (1980–1984)
- NBA draft: 1984: 1st round, 14th overall pick
- Drafted by: San Diego Clippers
- Playing career: 1984–2000
- Position: Power forward / center
- Number: 44, 4, 45

Career history
- 1984–1988: Los Angeles Clippers
- 1988–1994: Seattle SuperSonics
- 1994–1996: Cleveland Cavaliers
- 1996–1997: Philadelphia 76ers
- 1997–2000: New Jersey Nets

Career highlights
- NBA rebounding leader (1988); Consensus second-team All-American (1984); 2× WAC Player of the Year (1983, 1984); 2× First-team All-WAC (1983, 1984)

Career NBA statistics
- Points: 8,278 (7.3 ppg)
- Rebounds: 8,646 (7.6 rpg)
- Steals: 1,050 (0.9 spg)
- Stats at NBA.com
- Stats at Basketball Reference
Medals
Representing United States
Basketball
Pan American Games
Gold medal – first place	1983 Caracas	Team competition

Michael Jerome Cage Sr. (born January 28, 1962) is an American former professional basketball player and current broadcast analyst for the Oklahoma City Thunder.

== Basketball career ==
A 6'9" power forward/center from San Diego State, he is the Aztecs' all-time rebounding leader and second leading scorer as of 2011. Cage was the 14th pick of the 1984 NBA draft. He played 15 NBA seasons (1984–2000) with five teams: the Los Angeles Clippers, the Seattle SuperSonics, the Cleveland Cavaliers, the Philadelphia 76ers and the New Jersey Nets.

On January 19, 1987, Cage scored a career-high 29 points in a loss against the San Antonio Spurs.

During the 1987–88 season when, as a member of the Clippers, he led the league in rebounding with 13.0 per game. He was on a personal duel with Charles Oakley, who was playing with the Chicago Bulls at the time. Cage needed to register 28 rebounds in his final game to beat out Oakley for the rebounding title. He ended up grabbing 30. Just weeks later, during the 1988 NBA draft, Cage was traded to the Seattle SuperSonics for a future first-round pick and Gary Grant. During his first season in Seattle, Cage would make the postseason for the first time in his career. Several years later, during the 1993 NBA Playoffs, Cage and the SuperSonics would come within one game of reaching the NBA Finals, losing to the Charles Barkley-led Suns in seven games.

During his career, Cage earned the nicknames "John Shaft" and "Windexman" (as in "cleaning the glass") for his rebounding prowess and hard work on defense.

Cage held the record for most career 3-point attempts without a make (0–25) until Zaza Pachulia reached 0–26 for his career during the 2017–2018 season. Pachulia retired after the 2018 - 2019 season and he still holds the record at 0 - 31.

Cage's final game was on January 17, 2000, in a 96–101 loss to the Philadelphia 76ers where he recorded 3 rebounds and 1 assist, but no points.

== Career statistics ==
Legend
GP	Games played	GS	Games started	MPG	Minutes per game
FG%	Field goal percentage	3P%	3-point field goal percentage	FT%	Free throw percentage
RPG	Rebounds per game	APG	Assists per game	SPG	Steals per game
BPG	Blocks per game	PPG	Points per game	**Bold**	Career high
*	Led the league

=== NBA ===
==== Regular season ====
Year	Team	GP	GS	MPG	FG%	3P%	FT%	RPG	APG	SPG	BPG	PPG
1984–85	L.A. Clippers	75	41	21.5	.543	–	.737	5.2	.7	.5	.4	7.1
1985–86	L.A. Clippers	78	12	20.1	.479	.000	.649	5.3	1.0	.8	.4	6.7
1986–87	L.A. Clippers	80	76	36.5	.521	.000	.730	11.5	**1.6**	1.2	.8	**15.7**
1987–88	L.A. Clippers	72	70	**36.9**	.470	.000	.688	**13.0***	1.5	**1.3**	.8	14.0
1988–89	Seattle	80	71	31.7	.498	.000	.743	9.6	**1.6**	1.2	.7	10.3
1989–90	Seattle	**82***	**82***	31.6	.504	–	.698	10.0	.9	1.0	.5	9.7
1990–91	Seattle	**82***	55	26.1	.506	.000	.625	6.8	1.1	1.0	.7	6.4
1991–92	Seattle	**82**	69	30.0	**.566**	.000	.620	8.9	1.1	1.2	.7	8.8
1992–93	Seattle	**82**	66	26.3	.526	.000	.469	8.0	.8	.9	.6	6.1
1993–94	Seattle	**82***	42	20.8	.548	.000	.486	5.4	.5	.9	.5	4.6
1994–95	Cleveland	**82***	21	24.9	.521	.000	.602	6.9	.7	.7	.8	5.0
1995–96	Cleveland	**82**	80	32.1	.556	.000	.543	8.9	.6	1.1	**1.0**	6.0
1996–97	Philadelphia	**82**	24	15.2	.468	.000	.463	3.9	.5	.6	.5	1.8
1997–98	New Jersey	79	17	15.2	.512	.000	.556	3.9	.4	.6	.6	1.3
1999–00	New Jersey	20	7	12.1	.500	–	**1.000**	4.1	.5	.4	.4	1.4
Career		1,140	733	26.1	.515	.000	.664	7.6	.9	.9	.6	7.3

==== Playoffs ====
Year	Team	GP	GS	MPG	FG%	3P%	FT%	RPG	APG	SPG	BPG	PPG
1989	Seattle	8	0	21.9	**.609**	.000	.409	5.8	.6	**.9**	.4	**7.1**
1991	Seattle	5	0	16.0	.429	–	.765	4.2	.4	.6	.4	5.0
1992	Seattle	9	4	21.9	.559	–	**1.000**	5.7	.4	.7	.9	4.3
1993	Seattle	**19**	2	19.9	.525	–	.389	5.8	.5	.7	.4	4.8
1994	Seattle	5	**5**	18.6	.375	–	.333	5.4	**.8**	.8	1.0	2.8
1995	Cleveland	4	0	20.3	.444	.000	.000	4.5	**.8**	.5	1.0	4.0
1996	Cleveland	3	3	**33.7**	.571	–	.600	**9.3**	.7	.7	**1.7**	6.3
Career		53	14	20.8	.523	.000	.493	5.7	.6	.7	.6	4.9

== Personal life ==
On September 17, 2014, the Oklahoma City Thunder announced Cage would be joining their broadcast team, replacing analyst Grant Long.

== See also ==
- List of NBA annual rebounding leaders
- List of NBA single-game rebounding leaders
