= Dick Williams (footballer) =

English footballer

Personal information
- Full name: Richard Williams
- Date of birth: 15 December 1905
- Place of birth: Newcastle-upon-Tyne, England
- Date of death: 27 May 1983 (aged 77)
- Position: Goalkeeper

Senior career*
Years	Team	Apps	(Gls)
1925–1926	Jarrow		
1926–1929	Stoke City	61	(0)
1930–1931	Reading	4	(0)
1931–1932	Chester	0	(0)
1932–1935	Macclesfield	138	(0)
Total		203	(0)
- * Club domestic league appearances and goals

Richard Williams (15 December 1905 – 27 May 1983) was an English footballer who played in the Football League for Reading and Stoke City.

== Career ==
Williams played for Jarrow before being spotted by scouts from Stoke City in 1926. It took him until the 1928–29 season before he could displace Bob Dixon. He played in 36 matches that season and then 24 in 1929–30 but he lost his place to Norman Lewis. He then spent a season at Reading and Chester.

== Career statistics ==
Appearances and goals by club, season and competition
Club	Season	League			FA Cup		Other		Total	
Club	Season	Division	Apps	Goals	Apps	Goals	Apps	Goals	Apps	Goals
Stoke	1926–27	Third Division North	1	0	0	0	—		1	0
Stoke	1927–28	Second Division	1	0	0	0	—		1	0
Stoke	1928–29	Second Division	35	0	1	0	—		36	0
Stoke	1929–30	Second Division	24	0	0	0	—		24	0
Stoke	Total		61	0	1	0	—		62	0
Reading	1930–31	Second Division	4	0	0	0	—		4	0
Macclesfield	1931–32	Cheshire League	15	0	0	0	3	0	18	0
Macclesfield	1932–33	Cheshire League	41	0	2	0	5	0	48	0
Macclesfield	1933–34	Cheshire League	41	0	5	0	8	0	54	0
Macclesfield	1934–35	Cheshire League	41	0	3	0	6	0	50	0
Macclesfield	Total		138	0	10	0	22	0	170	0
Career total			203	0	11	0	22	0	236	0

== Honours ==
Stoke City

- Football League Third Division North champions: 1926–27
