= Richard Williams (rugby league) =

Australian rugby league footballer

Richie Williams
Personal information
- Full name: Richard Williams
- Born: 31 May 1986 (age 40) Moruya, New South Wales, Australia

Playing information
- Height: 182 cm (6 ft 0 in)
- Weight: 92 kg (14 st 7 lb)

Rugby league
- Position: Fullback, Five-eighth
Club
Years	Team	Pld	T	G	FG	P
2007	St. George Illawarra	8	5	0	0	20
2007	Penrith Panthers	4	1	0	0	4
	Total	12	6	0	0	24

Rugby union
Representative
Years	Team	Pld	T	G	FG	P
2011	Australia 7s	9	4	0	0

Richard "Richie" Williams (born 31 May 1986) is an Indigenous Australian former professional rugby league footballer. Williams previously played as a five-eighth for the Penrith Panthers, the St. George Illawarra Dragons and the Gold Coast Titans.

== Background ==
Williams was born in Moruya, New South Wales, Australia.

== Playing career and controversies ==
In 2007, Williams was charged with assault, after an incident in the town of Narooma, New South Wales

Also in 2007, Williams created controversy after publicly sledging rival Sydney Roosters player Braith Anasta prior to a game between their respective clubs; a game in which both Williams and his club were considerably dominated by Anasta and the Roosters respectively. Williams was demoted to the premier league by coach Nathan Brown soon afterwards Williams was also involved in an altercation with controversial Bulldogs player Willie Mason over the issue.

Although Williams returned to first-grade with the Dragons, he was eventually released mid-season and signed a contract with the Panthers for the remainder of the year and 2008.

In May 2008, Williams was sacked from the Penrith Panthers following an incident, the details of which were never released.

Williams also played club rugby union in Sydney and made the Australian Sevens side.

Williams last played for the Burleigh Bears in the Queensland Cup.
