= D. J. Gay =

American basketball player

D.J. Gay
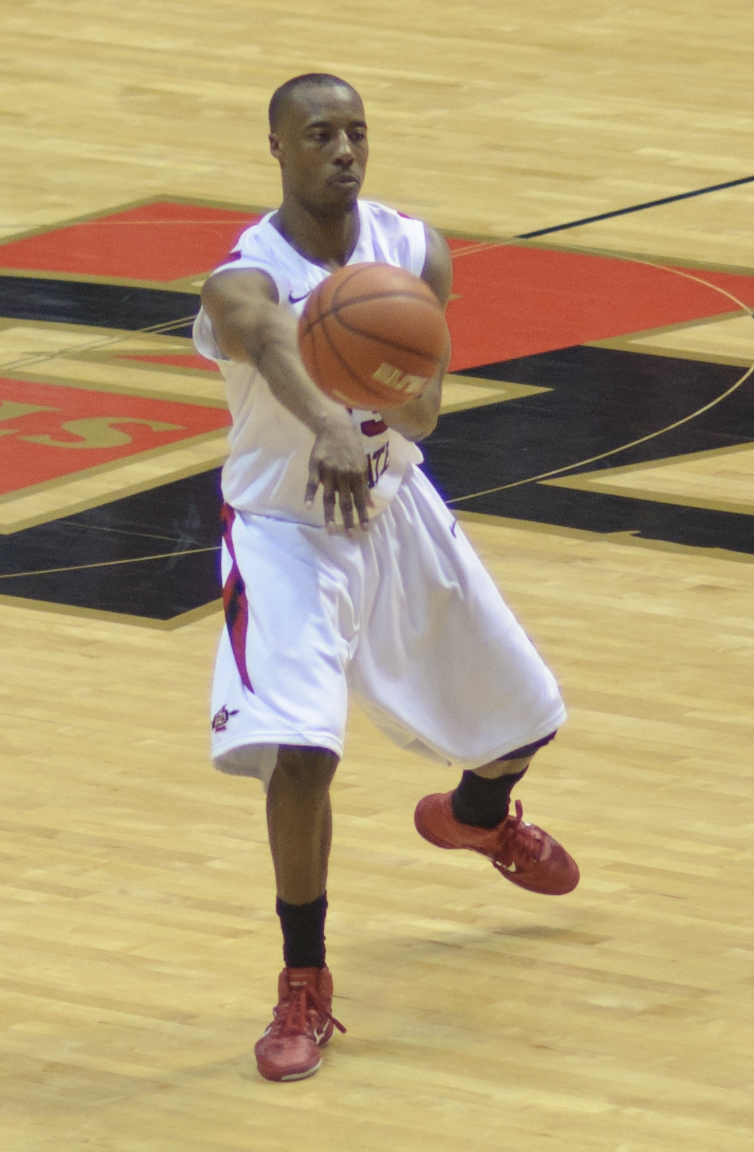
- Gay playing for San Diego State in 2011

Personal information
- Born: February 15, 1989 (age 37) Sun Valley, California, U.S.
- Listed height: 6 ft 0 in (1.83 m)
- Listed weight: 170 lb (77 kg)

Career information
- High school: John H. Francis Polytechnic (San Fernando Valley, California)
- College: San Diego State (2007–2011)
- NBA draft: 2011: undrafted
- Playing career: 2011–2013
- Position: Point guard

Career history
- 2011–2012: Helios Domžale
- 2012–2013: Andrea Costa Imola

Career highlights
- Slovenian League All-star (2011)

Darnley Earl "D.J." Gay (born February 15, 1989) is an American former professional basketball player. He is a 6 ft 0 in (183 cm) tall point guard. He attended John H. Francis Polytechnic High School and played college basketball at San Diego State.

== Pro career ==
In August 2011, he signed with Slovenian club KK Helios Domžale of the Adriatic League. In September 2012 he signed with Andrea Costa Imola in Italy. In August 2013, he signed with Politekhnika-Halychyna in Ukraine. However, he left them before appearing in a game.
