= Brandon Heath (basketball) =

American basketball player

Personal information
- Born: March 1, 1984 (age 42) Los Angeles, California, United States
- Listed height: 6 ft 4 in (1.93 m)
- Listed weight: 198 lb (90 kg)

Career information
- High school: Westchester (Los Angeles, California)
- College: San Diego State (2003–2007)
- NBA draft: 2007: undrafted
- Playing career: 2007–2016
- Position: Point guard

Career history
- 2007–2008: Orléans Loiret Basket
- 2008–2009: Los Angeles D-Fenders
- 2009: Trotamundos de Carabobo
- 2009–2010: APOEL
- 2010–2013: PBC Lukoil Academic
- 2013–2014: Reno Bighorns
- 2014–2015: Levski Sofia
- 2015: Club Sagesse
- 2015: Śląsk Wrocław
- 2016: APOEL

Career highlights
- 4× Bulgarian League champion (2011–2014); 4× Bulgarian Cup winner (2011–2014); Balkan League champion (2014); Cypriot League champion (2010); Cypriot Cup winner (2016); MWC Player of the Year (2006)
- Stats at Basketball Reference

Brandon Loyvon Heath (born March 1, 1984) is an American former professional basketball player who last played for APOEL of the Cyprus Basketball Division 1.

== College career ==
Heath played collegiately at San Diego State University for the Aztecs and left the school as the all-time leader in: scoring (2,189), field goals (749), field goals attempted (1,815), three-point field goals (281), three-point field goals attempted (798), steals (217), games played (125), games started (120), double-digit scoring games (112) and minutes played (4,275). He is also second on the Mountain West Conference all-time points leader board.

== Professional career ==
Heath went undrafted in the 2007 NBA draft. In the 2007–08 season, he played in France for Orléans Loiret Basket, where he averaged 12 points, 2.8 rebounds and 1.9 assists in 25 games.

In July 2008, he joined the Los Angeles Clippers for the 2008 NBA Summer League. On September 10, 2008, he signed with the Los Angeles Lakers. However, he was later waived by the Lakers on October 20, 2008. After not making the Lakers final roster for the 2008–09 season, he was acquired by the Los Angeles D-Fenders of the NBA Development League.

For the 2009–10 season, Heath played for the Cypriot side APOEL and helped his team to win the Cypriot League. He then played from 2010 to 2013 for PBC Lukoil Academic of Bulgaria.

On September 29, 2013, he signed with the Sacramento Kings. However, he was later waived by the Kings on October 15, 2013. In November 2013, he was acquired by the Reno Bighorns. In February 2014, he returned to Bulgaria and signed a one-and-a-half-year contract with Levski Sofia. On April 22, 2015, he left Levski and signed with Club Sagesse of the Lebanese Basketball League.

On September 16, 2015, he signed a one-year deal with Polish club Śląsk Wrocław. On December 15, 2015, he parted ways with Śląsk. On 27 December 27, 2015, he signed again with Cypriot club APOEL, returning to the club after five years. Two months later, he managed to add another trophy to his collection, after winning the Cypriot Cup with APOEL.
