= Richie Williams (basketball) =

American basketball player

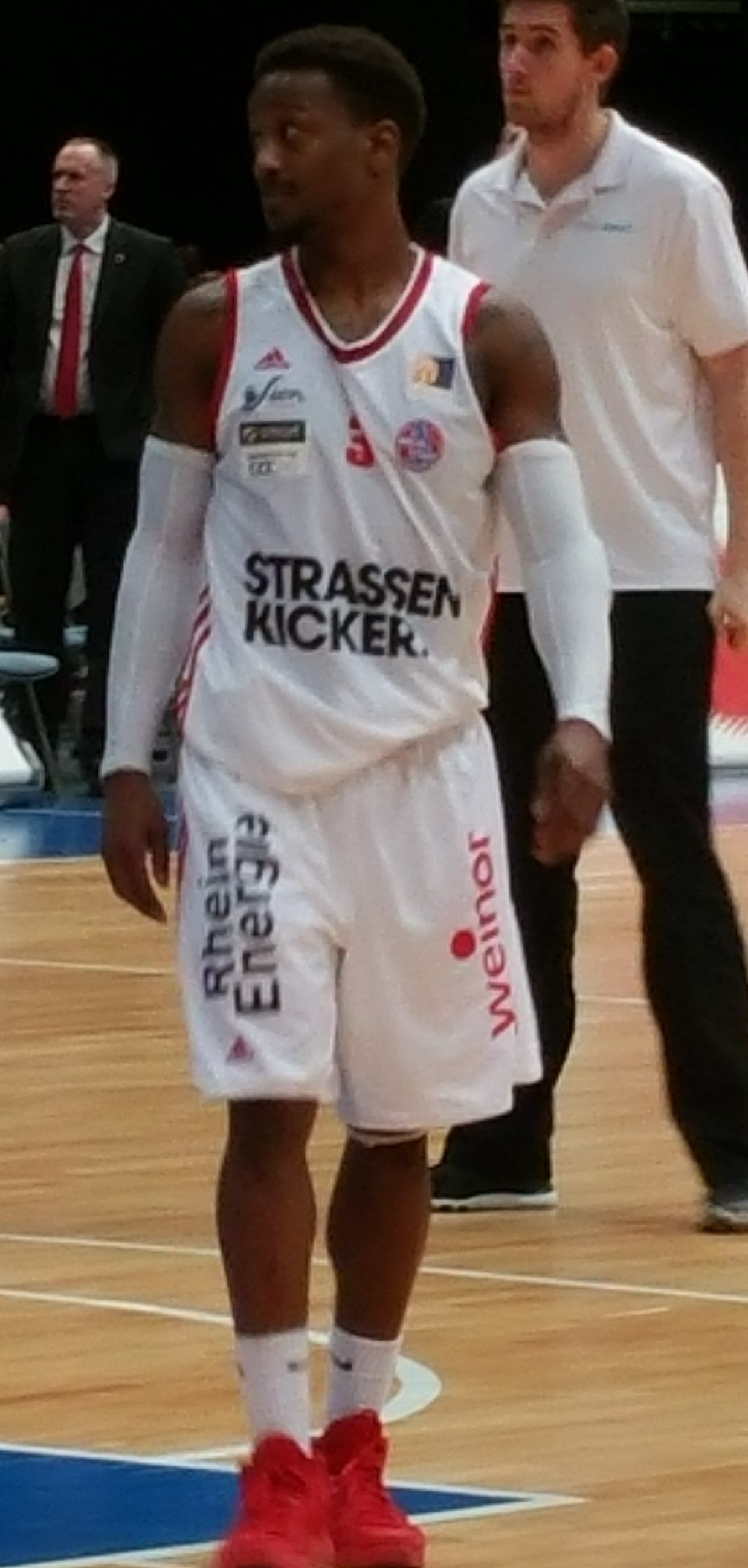
- Williams with RheinStars Köln in 2017

Personal information
- Born: August 22, 1987 (age 39) San Diego, California, U.S.
- Listed height: 1.78 m (5 ft 10 in)
- Listed weight: 73 kg (161 lb)

Career information
- High school: Steele Canyon (Spring Valley, California)
- College: San Diego State (2005–2009)
- NBA draft: 2009: undrafted
- Playing career: 2009–2020
- Position: Point guard

Career history
- 2009–2010: FSU Selfoss
- 2010–2011: San Diego Sol
- 2011–2012: Hannover Tigers
- 2012–2014: Rasta Vechta
- 2014–2015: Frankfurt Skyliners
- 2015: Rasta Vechta
- 2015–2016: Kirchheim Knights
- 2016: Phoenix Hagen
- 2016–2017: RheinStars Köln
- 2017: Zonkeys de Tijuana
- 2017–2018: PS Karlsruhe Lions
- 2018–2019: BK Pardubice
- 2019–2020: Helsinki Seagulls

Career highlights
- American Basketball Association All Star (2011); ABA All Star-Game (2011); ProA Player of the Year (2013)

Richard Lawrence Williams (born August 22, 1987) is an American former professional basketball player. He signed with the Helsinki Seagulls in June 2019.
