= List of San Diego State University people =

This is a list of notable present and former faculty, staff, and students of San Diego State University (SDSU).

== Alumni ==
=== Academia ===
- Joan Bybee, professor emerita at the University of New Mexico, linguist; M.A. Linguistics
- David Daniel, professor emeritus of psychology at James Madison University
- Chukuka S. Enwemeka, emeritus distinguished professor, University of Wisconsin—Milwaukee; president and vice chancellor of James Hope University, Lagos, Nigeria.
- Tom Garrison, distinguished professor emeritus of marine science at Orange Coast College, author, writer of Emmy Award-winning Oceanus, M.S. Marine Biology
- Jacques Gauthier, paleotonlogist and professor at Yale University and Peabody Museum of Natural History; B.S. Zoology 1973, M.S. Biological Science 1980
- Arthur Jensen, professor emeritus of educational psychology at University of California, Berkeley; M.A. Psychology 1952
- Samuel Kounaves, professor of chemistry at Tufts University
- M. Brian Maple,professor of physics at University of California, San Diego; B.S. Physics 1963
- LaVerne E. Ragster, M.S., marine biologist; 4th president of the University of the Virgin Islands 2002–2009
- Robert Titzer, professor and infant researcher; teaching certificate
- Paul J. Zak, professor and founder of the Neuroscience as a Service (NaaS) platform Immersion

=== Art ===
- John Baldessari, conceptual artist; B.A., 1953; M.A., 1957
- Dan Corson, artist; B.A. Theater, 1986
- Amy Devers, furniture designer and TV personality (Freeform Furniture, Designer People, Trading Spaces, Home Made Simple); B.A. Furniture Design, 1997
- June Edmonds, painter and public artist
- Fred Holle, fine art painter and educator
- Bridgette Meinhold, artist and author with a focus on sustainability; B.S. Mechanical Engineering 2003
- Marisa Scheinfeld, photographer; M.F.A., 2011
- Suzy Spafford, cartoonist, creator of "Suzy's Zoo"; B.F.A., 1957
- Salvador Torres, artist and muralist, father of the Chicano Park murals; M.A. Painting and Drawing, 1973
- Don Weeke, fiber and gourd artist, M.S.W, 1976

=== Crime ===
- Duncan D. Hunter, US representative, pleaded guilty to conspiracy to misuse campaign funds
- Kristin Rossum, toxicologist convicted of the murder of her husband

=== Entertainment ===
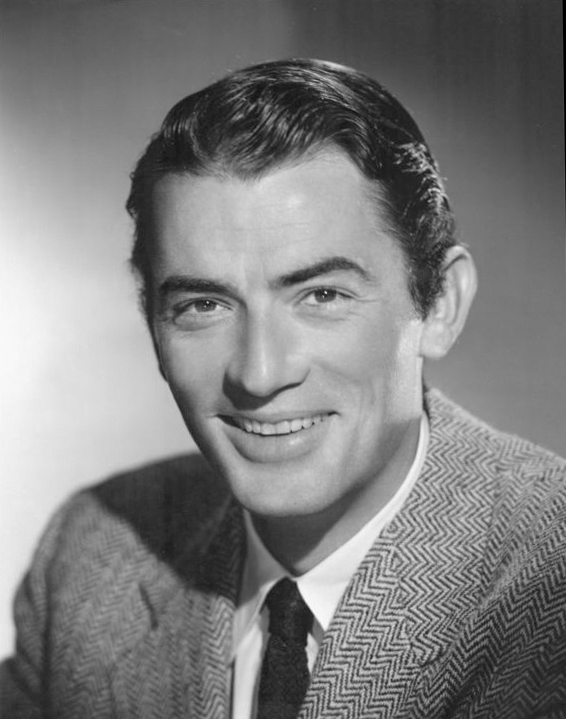
Gregory Peck

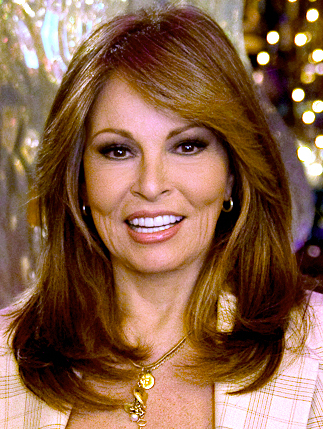
Raquel Welch

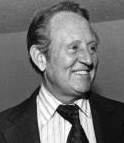
Art Linkletter

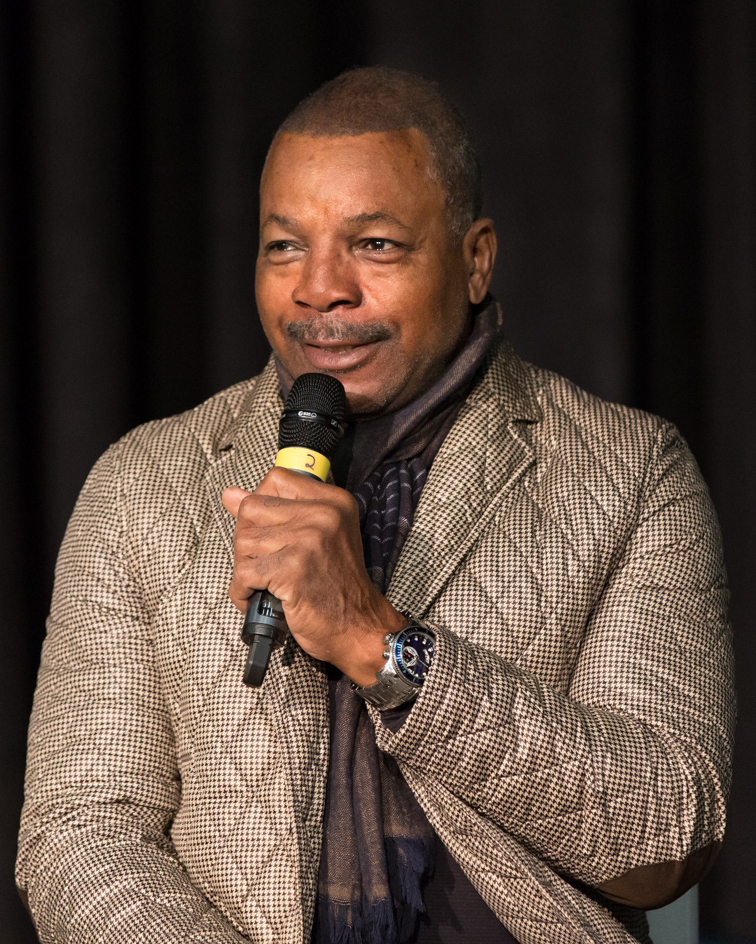
Carl Weathers

- Lloyd Bryan Molander Adams, executive producer, channel executive and director
- K.D. Aubert, fashion model, actress and Fantanas member
- Jesse Billauer, quadriplegic, motivational speaker, surfer; B.A. Communications, 2002
- Haley Bishop, actress
- Luke Brugnara, businessman, casino mogul
- Justin Burquist, filmmaker and music video director
- Brian Patrick Butler, actor and filmmaker
- Russell Carpenter, cinematographer of Titanic; B.A. English, 1972
- Destin Daniel Cretton, filmmaker
- Adam Daniel, actor
- Erika De La Cruz, television host and media personality for Fashion Week; B.A. Film and Fashion
- DJ Rectangle, DJ/turntablist and Grammy Award-nominated dance/hip hop/club record producer; B.B.A.
- Fred Dryer, actor-producer and former NFL player
- Faye Emerson, actress
- Mickey Faerch, burlesque dancer and actress
- Matt Flynn, drummer of Maroon 5 (attended briefly)
- Courtney Friel, television host; B.A. Political Science, 2002
- Steve Froehlich, actor
- Vic Fuentes, lead singer of Pierce the Veil
- Ted Giannoulas, San Diego Chicken
- Bob Goen, media personality and Entertainment Tonight anchor-correspondent; B.A. Telecommunications and Film, 1976
- Crystal Harris, model
- Benjamin Howard, filmmaker
- Brion James, actor
- Darren Kavinoky, lawyer, TV personality
- Julie Kavner, actress; voice of Marge Simpson, The Simpsons; B.A. Drama, 1971
- Kathleen Kennedy, film producer; B.A. Telecommunications and Film, 1976
- Cy Kuckenbaker, filmmaker, 1998
- Akira Lane, actress, model, and pornographic film director
- George Lewis, NBC Nightly News correspondent
- Joe Liggins, R&B musician who wrote and recorded "The Honeydripper"
- Jim Lindberg, lead singer of punk band Pennywise (attended briefly)
- Art Linkletter (1912–2010), veteran entertainer; B.A. Teaching, 1934
- Cleavon Little, actor; B.A. Drama
- Manny MUA, YouTuber; B.A., 2013
- Abby Martin, journalist, RT TV network; 9/11 conspiracy theorist; activist with mediaroots.org; B.A. Political Science, 2006
- Peter Menefee, costume- and stage-designer
- Adam Montoya, Internet celebrity, known as SeaNanners; B.A., 2006
- Kathy Najimy, actress; voice of Peggy Hill on King of the Hill
- Gregory Peck, actor
- Lisa Dergan Podsednik, model
- Zach Porter, lead singer of pop band Allstar Weekend
- Marion Ross, TV actress (Happy Days)
- Michael Matteo Rossi, filmmaker
- Saweetie, rapper; attended SDSU for two years before transferring to the University of Southern California
- Wally Schlotter, chairman of the San Diego Film Commission 1978–1996
- Whitney Shay, blues singer, 2008
- Tammie Souza, television meteorologist; B.S. Biology
- Susanna Thompson, actress; B.A. Drama, 1980
- Alison Waite, model
- Carl Weathers, actor/former professional football player, Apollo Creed in Rocky
- Kimberly Weinberger, actress
- Raquel Welch, actress
- Steve Yuhas, radio broadcaster and television personality
- Jeanne Zelasko, sports journalist, Fox Sports

=== Business ===
- Charles Brandes, founder of Brandes Investment Partners; B.A. Economics, 1965
- Norman E. Brinker, founder of Steak & Ale, former president of Jack in the Box, restaurateur innovator; B.S. Management 1957
- Adelia Coffman, founding CFO of Qualcomm Incorporated; B.S. Accounting 1976
- Vince Ferraro, senior general management and marketing executive, ExecRank's 2012 list of top 50 CMOs; B.S. Business Administration
- Van Arsdale France, '34, founding employee training manager at Disneyland, co-creator of "Disney University"
- Maruta Gardner, educator and community activist; M.S. Administration and Supervision 1976
- Rick Hamada, CEO of Avnet; B.S. Finance 1982
- Chris R. Hansen, hedge fund manager, unsuccessfully tried to lure the Sacramento Kings to Seattle in 2013
- Nik Ingersöll, entrepreneur and designer
- W. Craig Jelinek, president and chief executive officer of Costco
- Peggy Johnson, former executive vice president of Qualcomm, former executive vice president of Business Development at Microsoft, current CEO of Magic Leap; B.S. Electrical Engineering
- Doug Manchester, real estate developer, namesake of Manchester Grand Hyatt Hotel in San Diego, publisher of the San Diego Union Tribune; B.S. Finance 1965
- Sheryl Palmer, CEO of Taylor Morrison
- Robert O. Peterson, founder of Jack in the Box
- Sol Price, founder of Price Club (later merged with Costco); B.A. Philosophy 1936
- S. Donley Ritchey, former CEO and president of Lucky Stores and current director of The McClatchy Company; B.S. Accounting 1955, M.S. Management 1963
- Jim Sinegal, Costco chief executive officer, named to Time Magazine's 2006 list of the 100 most influential people; B.A. 1959
- James M. Sweeney, founder and former CEO, CareMark, Inc. (now CVS CareMark), B.S. 1969
- Russell Weiner, founder of RockStar Energy Drink; B.A. Political Science 1992
- Mike Wells, Prudential plc chief executive officer

=== Literature and journalism ===
- Greg Bear, science fiction author; B.A. English, 1973
- Darwin J. Flakoll, journalist, writer, and translater
- Sid Fleischman, author of children's books and screenplays; B.A. English
- Justin Halpern, author; B.A., 2003
- David Hasemyer, Pulitzer Prize-winning journalist; B.A. Journalism 1979
- David McKenna, writer, American History X
- Andy Rathbone, author of ...for Dummies books, technology writer; B.A. Literature, 1986
- Constance Reid, author of several biographies of mathematicians and popular books about mathematics; B.A. 1938
- J. Michael Straczynski, writer; B.A. Psychology and Sociology, 1976
- Joan D. Vinge, author; B.A., 1971

=== Military ===
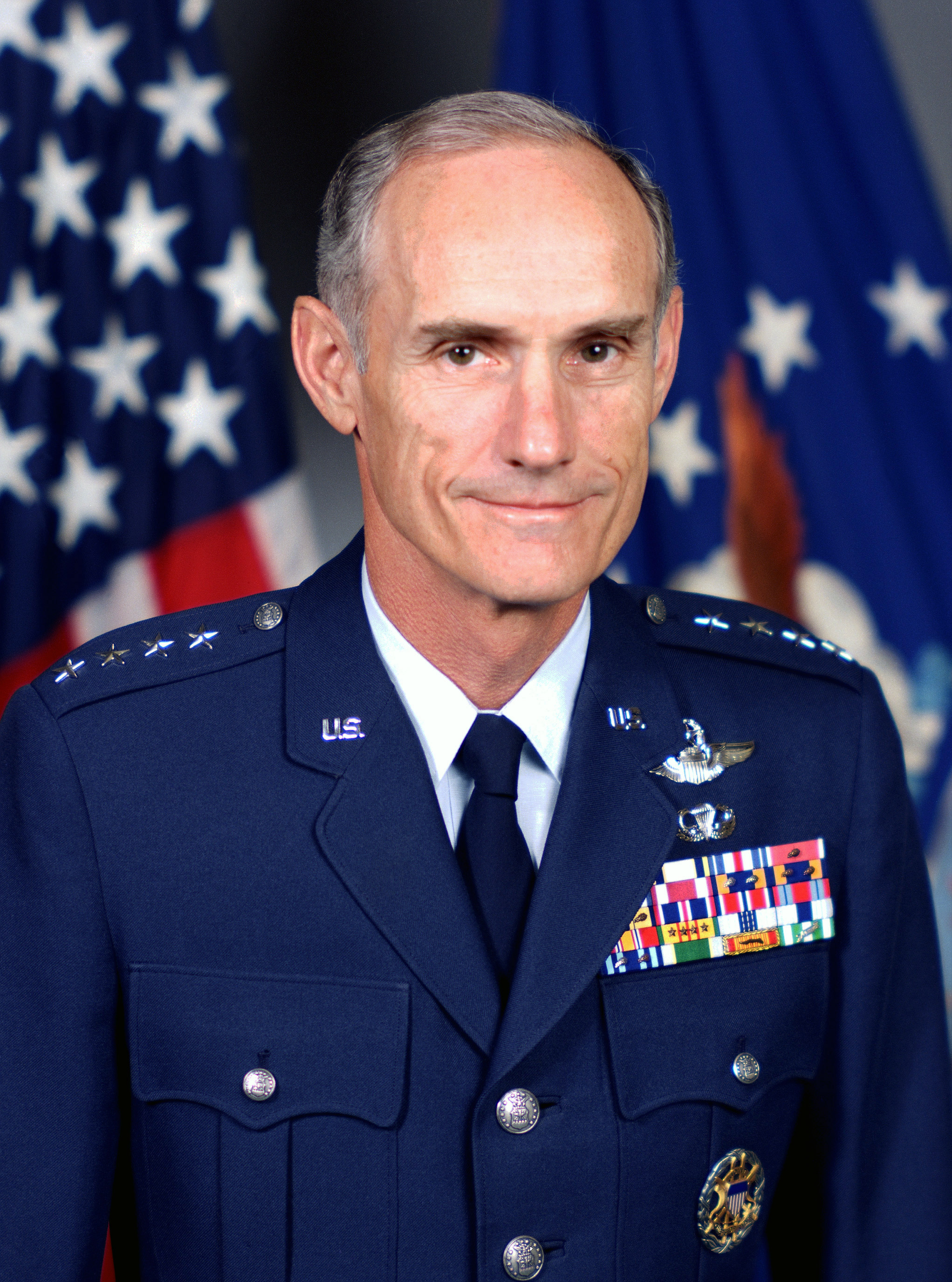
Merrill McPeak

- Robert Cardenas, retired brigadier general; B.A. 1972
- Thomas J. Haynes, Air National Guard general
- William J. Marks, USN commander, spokesman for the Defense Intelligence Agency; M.A. Mass Communication and Media Studies, 2007
- Merrill McPeak, retired Chief of Staff of the United States Air Force; B.A. Economics, 1957
- James E. McPherson, retired Navy officer, former 39th Judge Advocate General of the Navy; Bachelor of Public Administration, 1977
- Eugene P. Wilkinson, first commanding officer of the USS Nautilus (SSN-571), the world's first nuclear submarine; B.S. Chemistry, 1938
- Donald Erwin Wilson, U.S. Navy admiral; B.S. Accounting, 1954; M.S. Management, 1955
- Scott H. Swift, U.S. Navy retired admiral; B.A. 1979; served as the commander of the U.S. Pacific Fleet from May 27, 2015 to May 17, 2018

=== Politics and government ===
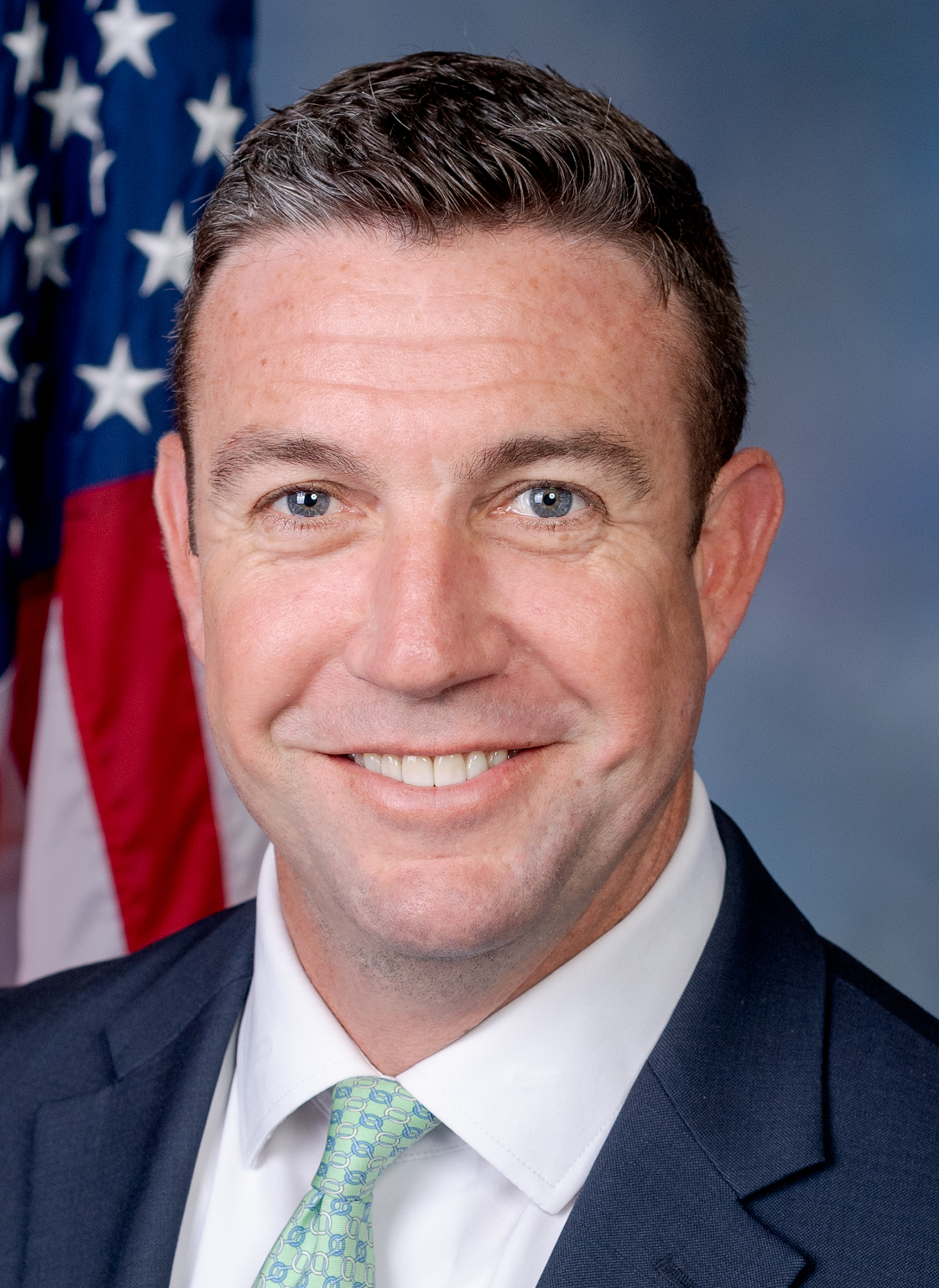
Duncan Hunter

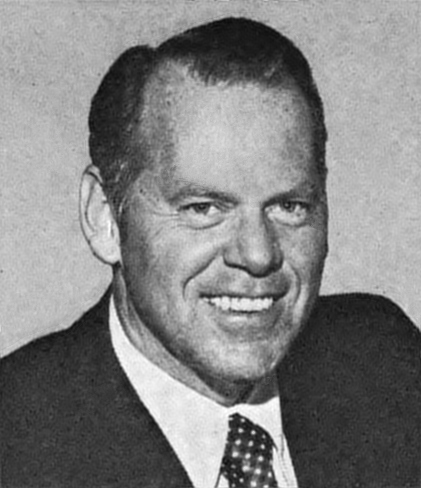
Clair Burgener

- Muhammed Al-Jasser, PhD (at UCR), Saudi Arabian economist who served as the Minister of Economy and Planning and chairman of Saudi Telecom; B.A. Economics 1979
- David Alvarez, San Diego City Council member
- Karen Bass, mayor of Los Angeles
- Roger Benitez, U.S. federal judge; B.A., 1974
- Clair Burgener, U.S. representative from California, 1973–1983
- Ken Calvert, U.S. representative from California; B.A., 1975
- Ammar Campa-Najjar, Democratic candidate
- John Duarte, U.S. representative from California; B.A. Finance, 1989
- Kevin Faulconer, mayor of San Diego; B.A. Political Science, 1990
- Dusty Foggo, former CIA official
- Georgette Gomez, San Diego City Council member
- Mike Gotch, California state assemblyman and San Diego City Council member
- Shirley Horton, assemblywoman 2002–2008
- Duncan D. Hunter, former member of Congress, California; convicted felon
- Brian Jones (born 1968), politician serving in the California State Senate
- Steven T. Kuykendall, former member of Congress, California; M.B.A., 1974
- Bill Lowery, lobbyist and former member of Congress
- Mark Meckler, political activist
- Rodney Melville, US judge
- Celeste Rodriguez, California state assemblywoman
- Robin Robinson, Bucks County Recorder of Deeds
- Mary Salas, California state assemblywoman
- Lori Saldana, California state assemblywoman
- Jerry Sanders, former mayor of San Diego, former chief of police
- Glenn E. Trowbridge (born 1943), Republican member of the Nevada Assembly
- Howard Wayne, assemblyman 1996–2002
- Leon Williams, San Diego City Council member (1969–1982), San Diego County Board of Supervisors supervisor (1982–1994), first Black member of both institutions
- Bob Wilson, former member of Congress, namesake of Bob Wilson Naval Hospital

=== Science ===
- Belle Benchley, director of San Diego Zoo
- Laurance Doyle, SETI astronomer; M.S. Astronomy
- Gordon Eugene Martin, pioneering piezoelectric materials researcher for underwater sound transducers
- Ellen Ochoa, PhD (from Stanford University), first Latina astronaut; B.S. Physics 1980
- Mark M. Phillips, PhD (from UC Santa Cruz), US astronomer and cosmologist, Gruber Prize Laureate of 2007 for the discovery of dark energy and the accelerating universe, member of the High-Z Supernova Search Team; B.S. Astronomy 1973
- Bernard Rimland, PhD, autism researcher and founder of the Autism Society of America; M.S. Psychology
- J. Michael Scott, PhD (from Oregon State University), senior scientist with the U.S. Geological Survey; M.S. Marine Biology
- Gina Simmons Schneider, PhD, psychoanalyst, writer; B.A. Psychology 1983

=== Sports ===
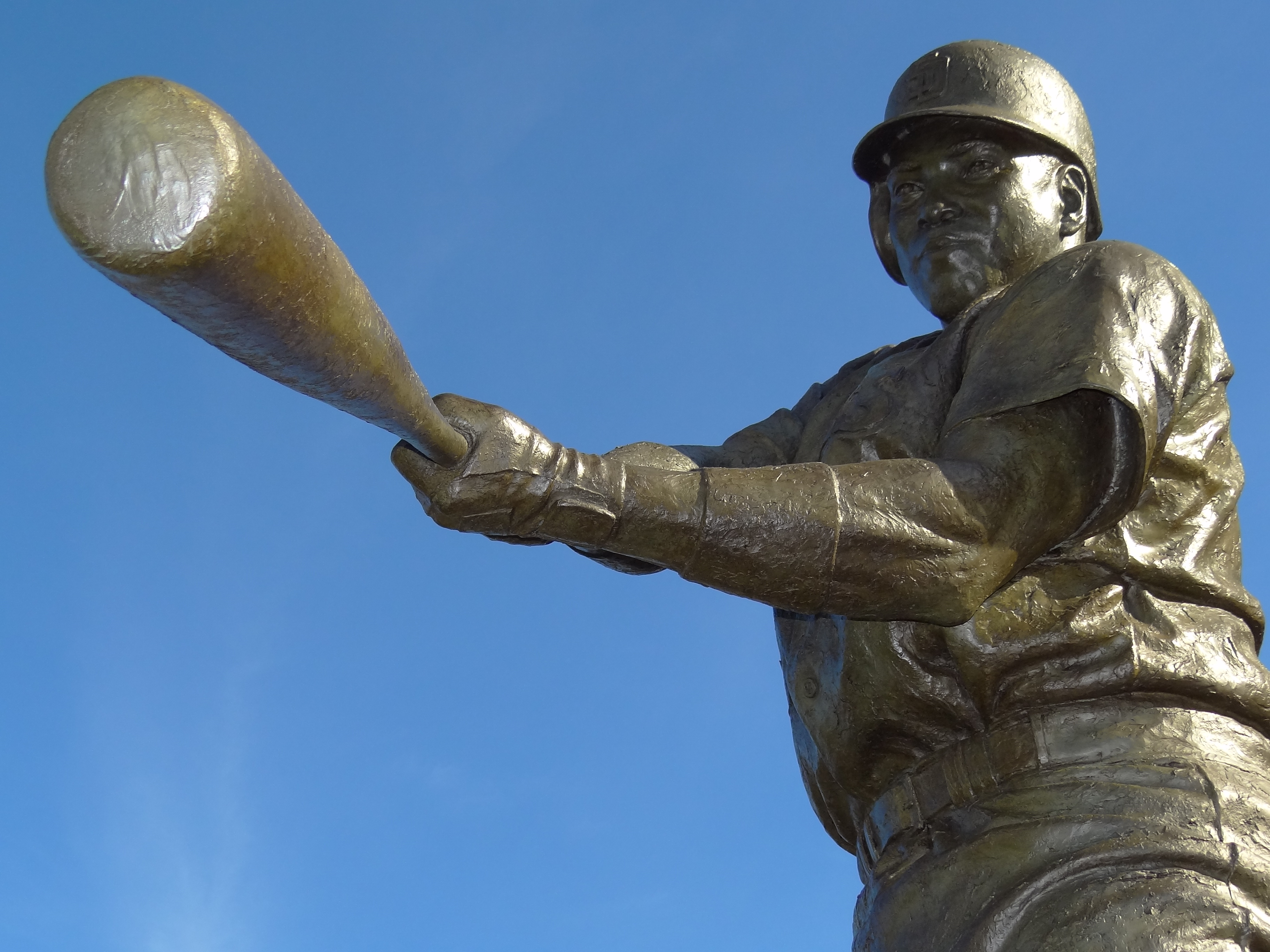
Tony Gwynn

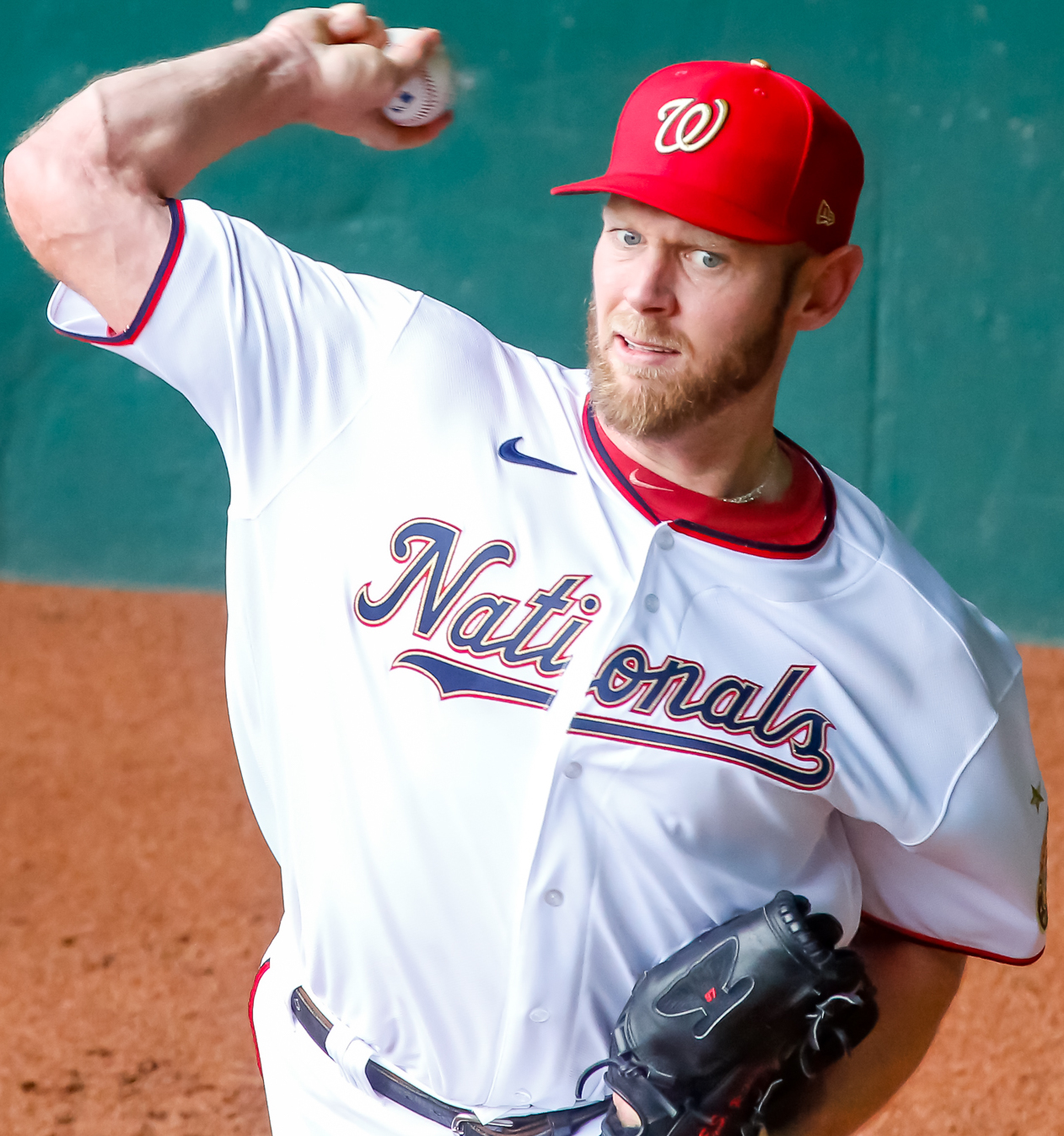
Stephen Strasburg

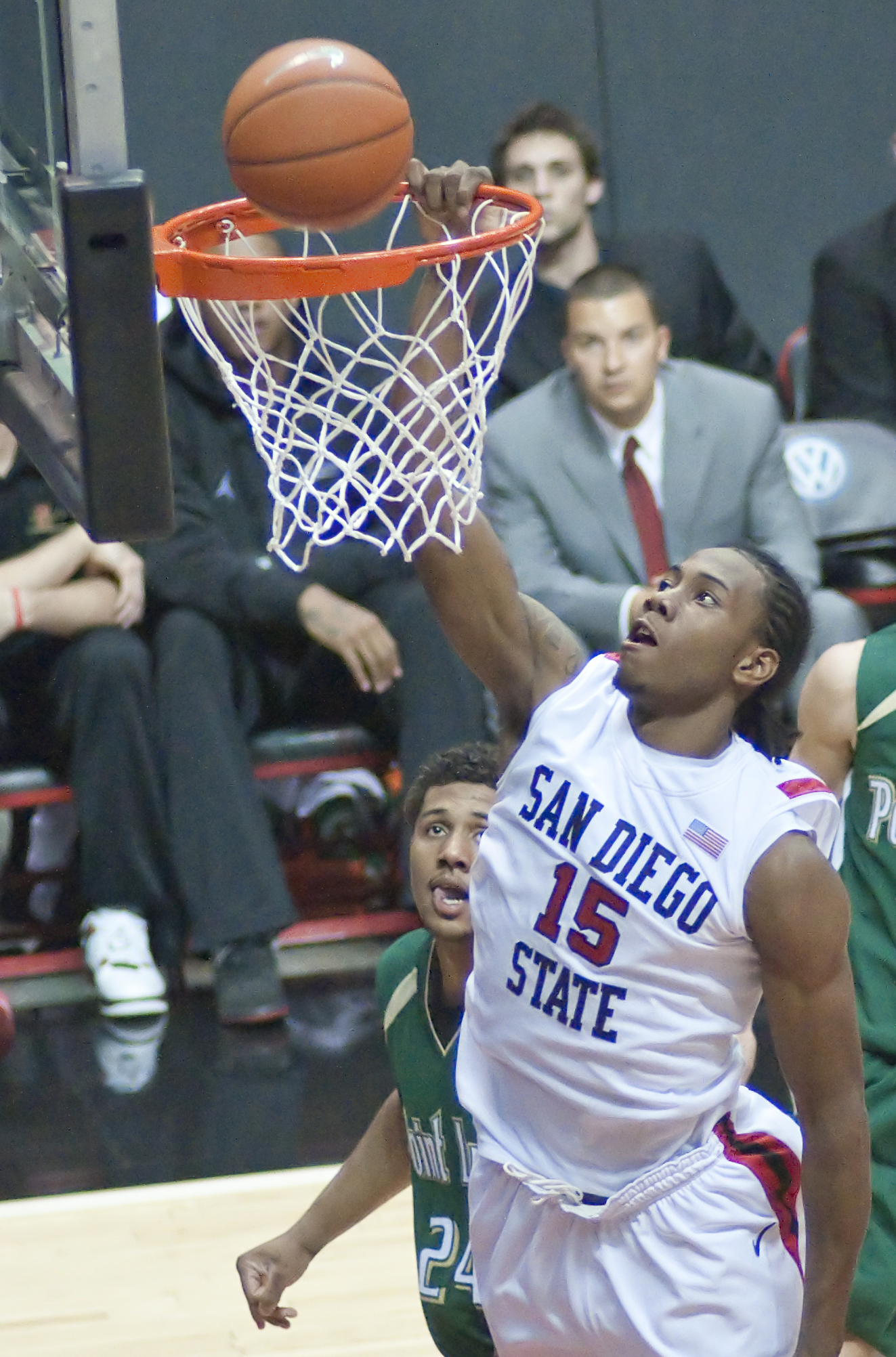
Kawhi Leonard

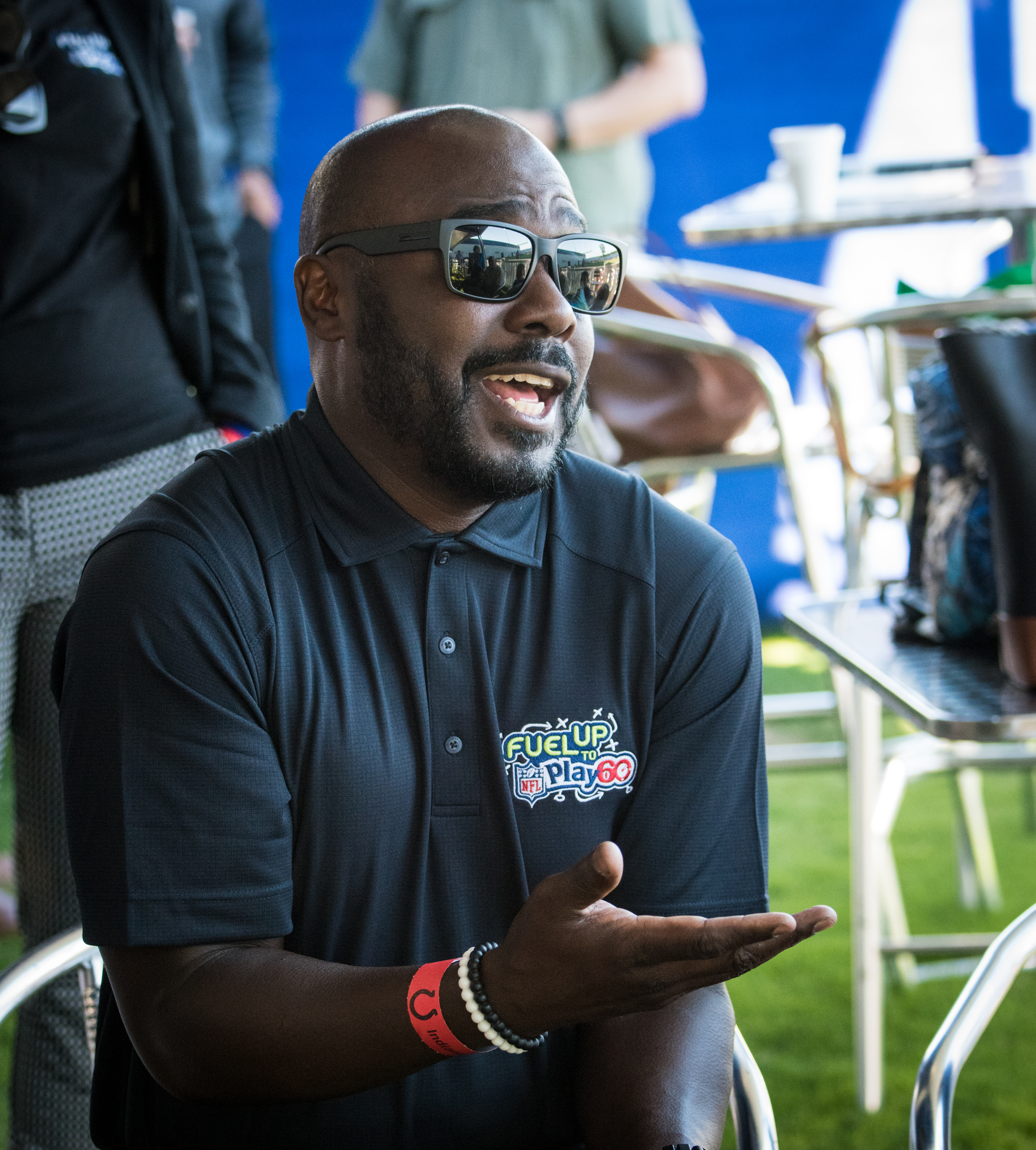
Marshall Faulk

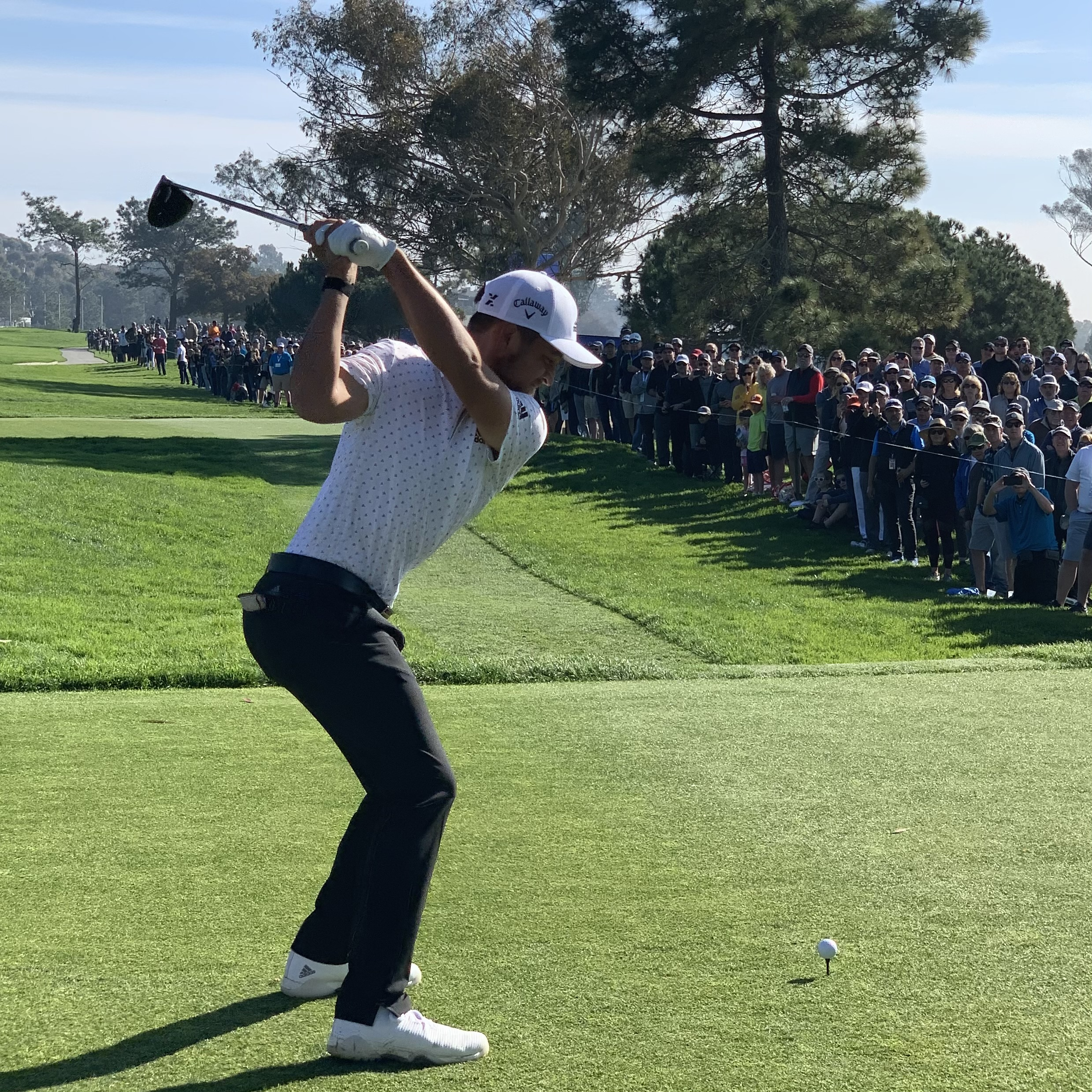
Xander Schauffele

==== Baseball ====
- Greg Allen, New York Yankees outfielder
- Bud Black, former Major League Baseball pitcher and former manager of the San Diego Padres; B.S. Management 1979
- Kerwin Danley, Major League Baseball umpire
- Jeff DaVanon, MLB baseball player
- Ty France, San Diego Padres infielder
- Mark Grace, retired Major League Baseball player and World Series Champion
- Chris Gwynn, retired Major League Baseball player
- Tony Gwynn, Baseball Hall of Famer
- Tony Gwynn Jr., Los Angeles Dodgers outfielder
- Aaron Harang, San Diego Padres pitcher
- Doug Harvey, former MLB Umpire and Baseball Hall of Fame Inductee 2010
- David Hensley, MLB infielder
- Alex Hinshaw, San Francisco Giants pitcher
- Travis Lee, former Major League Baseball player
- Justin Masterson, Cleveland Indians pitcher
- Bobby Meacham, former Major League Baseball player
- Bob Mendoza, Rugby Player of the Year 1967, former Red Sox outfielder
- Jason Phillips, former Major League Baseball catcher
- Addison Reed, relief pitcher for the Boston Red Sox
- Casey Schmitt (born 1999), infielder for the San Francisco Giants
- Dave Smith, former Major League Baseball pitcher
- Stephen Strasburg (born 1988), former Washington Nationals pitcher, 2019 World Series MVP

==== Basketball ====
- Dakarai Allen, professional basketball player
- Ryan Amoroso, former professional basketball player
- Matt Bradley, professional basketball player
- Michael Cage, former NBA player
- Brian Carlwell, former professional basketball player
- Zylan Cheatham, New Orleans Pelicans forward
- Mehdi Cheriet, former professional basketball player
- Angelo Chol, professional basketball player
- Josh Davis, former professional basketball player
- Jason Deutchman, former professional basketball player
- Malachi Flynn, Toronto Raptors guard
- Jamaal Franklin, professional basketball player
- D. J. Gay, former professional basketball player
- Kim Goetz, drafted 2nd round, 34th overall pick 1979 NBA draft
- Terrell Gomez, professional basketball player
- Morris Gross, former San Diego State Aztecs coach for Aztecs men's basketball and baseball
- Brandon Heath, former professional basketball player
- Randy Holcomb, former NBA player
- Michael Holper, former professional basketball player
- Tina Hutchinson (born 1964/1965), basketball player
- Keshad Johnson, NBA forward for Miami Heat
- Steffond Johnson, former NBA player
- Trey Kell, professional basketball player
- Joel Kramer (b. 1955), professional basketball player
- Jaedon LeDee, Minnesota Timberwolves forward
- Rock Lee, former NBA player
- Kawhi Leonard, Los Angeles Clippers forward, 2014 & 2019 NBA Finals MVP
- Steve Malovic (1956–2007), American-Israeli basketball player
- Jalen McDaniels, Washington Wizards center
- Joe McNaull, former professional basketball player
- Nathan Mensah, professional basketball player
- Matt Mitchell, professional basketball player
- J. J. O'Brien, professional basketball player
- Malik Pope, professional basketball player
- Hubert Roberts (born 1961), American-Israeli basketball player
- Aerick Sanders, Green Bay Phoenix coach and former professional basketball player
- Jordan Schakel, NBA G League player Maine Celtics
- John Sharper, former professional basketball player
- Winston Shepard, professional basketball player
- Marcus Slaughter, former NBA basketball player
- Deshawn Stephens, professional basketball player
- Chase Tapley, former professional basketball player
- Xavier Thames, drafted 2nd round, 59th overall pick of the 2014 NBA draft
- Malcolm Thomas (born 1988), professional basketball player
- Dave Velasquez, San Diego State Aztecs men's basketball assistant coach
- Lorrenzo Wade, former professional basketball player
- Anthony Watson, drafted 4th round, 87th overall pick 1986 NBA draft
- Yanni Wetzell, professional basketball player
- Billy White, professional basketball player
- Richie Williams, former professional basketball player
- Kevin Zabo, professional basketball player

==== Football ====
- Rob Awalt, former NFL tight end
- Alex Barrett, San Francisco 49ers defensive end
- Daniel Bellinger, New York Giants tight end
- Greg Boyd, former NFL defensive end
- Aaron Brewer, Arizona Cardinals long snapper
- Vincent Brown, former NFL wide receiver
- Daniel Brunskill, Tennessee Titans center
- Willie Buchanon, former NFL cornerback
- Miles Burris, former NFL linebacker
- Don Coryell, former NCAA and NFL head coach, member of the College Football Hall of Fame
- Isaac Curtis, former NFL wide receiver
- Tom Dahms, former NFL offensive tackle
- Brad Daluiso, former NFL placekicker
- Vernon Dean, former NFL cornerback
- Will Demps, former NFL safety
- Mike Douglass, former NFL linebacker
- Fred Dryer, former NFL defensive end, actor
- William Dunkle, offensive guard for the Pittsburgh Steelers
- Darius Durham, former NFL wide receiver
- Herm Edwards, former Kansas City Chiefs head coach
- Gavin Escobar, Dallas Cowboys tight end
- Brett Faryniarz, former NFL linebacker
- Marshall Faulk, former NFL running back; Pro Football Hall of Famer, Super Bowl Champion, 2000 NFL MVP
- Roman Fortin, former NFL center
- John Fox, football player
- Donte Gamble, American football player
- Gary Garrison, former NFL wide receiver
- Kabeer Gbaja-Biamila, former NFL defensive end
- Joe Gibbs, former NFL head coach of the Washington Redskins, Hall of Famer, and owner of NASCAR racing team Joe Gibbs Racing
- La'Roi Glover, former NFL defensive tackle
- Robert Griffith, former NFL safety
- Az-Zahir Hakim, former NFL wide receiver
- Darren Hall, Arizona Cardinals cornerback
- Ronnie Hillman, running back for the Denver Broncos
- Mike Houghton, former Buffalo Bills guard
- Bob Howard, former NFL cornerback
- Keith Ismael, Arizona Cardinals center
- Joe Jackson, gridiron football player
- Monte Jackson, former NFL cornerback
- Terry Jackson, former NFL cornerback
- Damontae Kazee, Pittsburgh Steelers safety
- Freddie Keiaho, current NFL linebacker for the Indianapolis Colts and Super Bowl XLI Champion
- Mike Kozlowski, former NFL safety
- Joe Lavender, former NFL cornerback
- Ryan Lindley, former NFL quarterback
- John Madden, former Oakland Raiders head coach, Monday Night Football color commentator
- Matt McCoy, current NFL linebacker for the Tampa Bay Buccaneers
- Patrick McMorris, Miami Dolphins safety
- Claudie Minor, former NFL offensive tackle
- Rich Moran, former NFL punter
- Kirk Morrison, former Oakland Raiders, Buffalo Bills, and Jacksonville Jaguars starting linebacker
- Haven Moses, NFL wide receiver
- Segun Olubi, Indianapolis Colts linebacker
- Kassim Osgood, former NFL wide receiver
- Scott Piercy, professional golfer
- Damon Pieri, NFL player
- Chester Pitts, NFL, Houston Texans
- Noel Prefontaine, Toronto Argonauts kicker
- Jimmy Raye, VP of Football Operations for the Indianapolis Colts
- Benny Ricardo, former NFL placekicker
- Patrick Rowe, NFL player
- Brian Russell, former NFL safety
- Ephraim Salaam, former NFL offensive tackle
- Mike Saxon, former NFL punter
- Chaz Schilens, NFL wide receiver, formerly with Oakland Raiders, currently with New York Jets
- Darnay Scott, former Cincinnati Bengals wide receiver
- Tyrell Shavers, Buffalo Bills wide receiver
- Brian Sipe, former Cleveland Browns quarterback
- Webster Slaughter, former wide receiver
- Jeff Staggs, former NFL linebacker
- Cameron Thomas, Kansas City Chiefs defensive end
- Zachary Thomas, New England Patriots offensive tackle
- Kyle Turley, former NFL offensive tackle
- Don Warren, former NFL tight end
- Jeff Webb, former Kansas City Chiefs wide receiver
- Ralph Wenzel, former NFL offensive guard
- Jim Wilks, former NFL defensive end
- Nate Wright, former NFL cornerback

==== Soccer ====
- Marcelo Balboa, World Cup and MLS soccer star
- Steven Beitashour, MLS All-Star Soccer, player for San Jose Earthquakes
- Joe Corona, soccer player, Club Tijuana Xoloitzcuintles de Caliente and United States men's national soccer team
- Gordon Dallas, North American Soccer League player
- Tally Hall, goalkeeper for Major League Soccer's Houston Dynamo
- Hannah Keane (born 1993), soccer player
- Dennis Sanchez, soccer coach
- Daniel Steres (born 1990), professional soccer player with the LA Galaxy
- Eric Wynalda, World Cup and MLS soccer player; Fox Sports broadcaster

==== Other sports ====
- Enrique Hernández, 1968 Olympic weightlifter
- Marty Hogan (born 1958), racquetball player
- Armen Keteyian, sports journalist, HBO Sports, Real Sports with Bryant Gumbel
- Jeanne Lenhart, senior Olympian, volleyball player, Ms. Senior San Diego 2012
- Ilima-Lei Macfarlane (Anthropology 2013), professional mixed martial artist, inaugural and current Bellator MMA Flyweight Champion
- Chris Marlowe, sportscaster, former Olympic volleyball player
- Dorian "Doc" Paskowitz (1921–2014), surfer and physician
- Charlene Rink, former professional fitness competitor
- Arnie Robinson, Olympic long jump gold medalist
- Xander Schauffele, professional golfer
- Willie Steele, 1948 Olympic long jump gold medalist

== Faculty ==
- Joanna Brooks, English professor
- Jeff Deverett, film producer and professor
- Jerry Farber, author, professor
- Martha Lauzen, film professor and researcher
- Larry McCaffery, writer, editor, post-modern literary critic, professor
- Khaleel Mohammed, PhD, professor of religious studies
- Shirley Weber, PhD, founding faculty and department chair, SDSU Department of Africana Studies

=== Retired and former faculty ===
- Nathalia Crane, poet, deceased professor of English
- Thomas B. Day, physicist, deceased president of SDSU 1978–1996
- Suzette Haden Elgin, author, retired linguistics professor
- Jerry Farber, civil rights activist and former child actor, professor emeritus of English & Comparative Literature
- Clinton Jencks, PhD, retired professor of Economics
- Lev Kirshner, soccer player and soccer coach
- Noel Loomis, deceased science fiction and mystery writer, English instructor
- Peter Neumeyer, author, retired literature professor
- John V. Pavlik, founding director of the SDSU School of Communication
- Anna Prieto Sandoval, Sycuan Band of the Kumeyaay Nation chairwoman, and teacher of the Kumeyaay language
- Jerome Sattler, retired professor of psychology
- Vernor Vinge, PhD, science fiction writer and visionary, retired professor of mathematics
- Joy Zedler, ecologist and botanist, founder of SDSU Pacific Estuarine Research Laboratory
