= Donley =

Donley may refer to:

== Surname ==
- Caragh Donley, American writer and television producer
- Charles "Red" Donley (1923–1998), long-time sports and news anchor in the Ohio Valley
- Doug Donley (born 1959), former American football wide receiver
- Elizabeth Donley (born 1970), American physicist
- Jamie Donley (born 2005), Northern Irish footballer
- Jimmy Donley (1929–1963), American singer-songwriter
- Joseph Benton Donley (1838–1917), Republican member of the U.S. House of Representatives from Pennsylvania
- Kerry J. Donley (1956–2022), Democratic member of the Alexandria, Virginia City Council
- Kevin Donley (born 1951), American football coach and former player
- Kimberly Donley (born 1965), American adult model and actress
- Michael B. Donley (born 1952), the 22nd Secretary of the United States Air Force
- Roy Donley (1885–1939), businessman, became a member of the Berkeley, California, Board of Park Commissioners
- S. Donley Ritchey, managing partner of Alpine Partners, a family investment general partnership in Danville, California
- Stockton P. Donley (1821–1871), Justice of the Supreme Court of Texas
- Willis E. Donley (1901–1985), American politician and lawyer

== Placename ==
- Donley County, Texas, county located in the U.S. state of Texas
- Donley Island, Pennsylvania, privately owned alluvial island in the Allegheny River in the U.S. state of Pennsylvania

== See also ==
- Donnelay
- Donnelly
- Downley
- Dunalley (disambiguation)
- Dunley (disambiguation)
