= Spilde =

Spilde is a surname. Notable people with the surname include:

- Arne Alsåker Spilde (1937–2024), Norwegian politician
- Katherine Spilde, American anthropologist
- Mary Spilde (born 1951), American college administrator
