= Elizabeth Donley =

American physicist

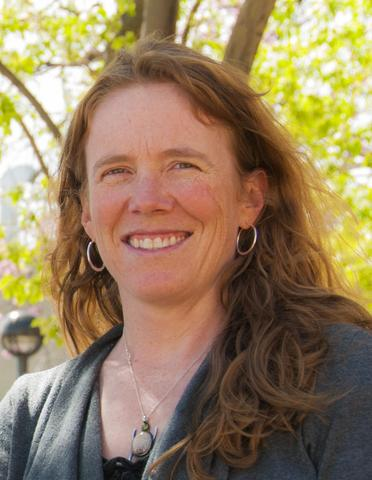
- Donley in 2015
- Born: April 5, 1970 (age 56)
- Education: University of Nevada, Las Vegas (BS); University of Colorado Boulder (MS); ETH Zurich (PhD)
- Awards: Department of Commerce Gold Medal (2004, 2014)
- Scientific career
- Fields: Physics
- Workplaces: National Institute of Standards and Technology
- Thesis: Single-molecule spectroscopy at subkelvin temperatures (2000)
- Doctoral advisor: Urs Wild
- Other academic advisors: Frédéric Merkt; David P. Shelton; Carl Wieman; Eric Allin Cornell

Elizabeth Ann Donley (born April 5, 1970) is an American physicist. For most of her career, she was a researcher in the Time and Frequency Division at the National Institute of Standards and Technology (NIST), where she served as Chief of the Time and Frequency Division from 2018 to 2025. Donley's research areas have included the operation and development of atomic fountain clocks and chip scale atomic devices and instruments. In 2025, Donley took early retirement from the U.S. Government and started work as an independent consultant. Now she helps companies develop and use atomic clocks for advanced timekeeping applications.

== Life ==
Donley was born on April 5, 1970. She completed a B.S. in physics from University of Nevada, Las Vegas in 1994. Donley earned a M.S. in physics at the University of Colorado Boulder in 1996. Donley completed her doctoral studies in Switzerland, earning a Ph.D. in natural sciences from ETH Zurich in 2000. Her thesis was titled Single-molecule spectroscopy at subkelvin temperatures. Donley's doctoral advisor was Urs Wild. Her postdoctoral research at the University of Colorado Boulder was on ultracold atomic physics with 2001 Nobel Laureates Carl Wieman and Eric Cornell.

Donley joined the National Institute of Standards and Technology in 2002 as a research physicist in the Time and Frequency Division at the Physical Measurement Laboratory; in 2018 she became its Division Chief.

She has served in a number of leadership positions for the IEEE professional society, including serving as VP of Frequency Control for the Ultrasonics, Ferroelectrics, and Frequency Control Society in 2018 and 2019 and again starting in 2026.

Donley's research areas include the operation and development of atomic fountain clocks and chip scale atomic devices and instruments, for which she has won the Department of Commerce Gold Medal in 2004 and 2014. In 2022, she won the IEEE C. B. Sawyer Memorial Award. In 2024 she won the IEEE Rabi Award.
