= Sycuan Band of the Kumeyaay Nation =

Native Kumeyaay Indians in Southern California

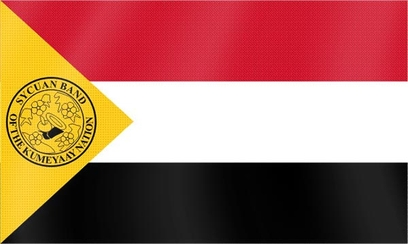
- Flag of the Sycuan Band of the Kumeyaay Nation

Total population
- 120

Regions with significant populations
- United States (California)

Languages
- Tipai, English

Religion
- Traditional tribal religion, Christianity (Roman Catholicism)

Related ethnic groups
- other Kumeyaay tribes, Cocopa, Quechan, Paipai, and Kiliwa

The Sycuan Band of the Kumeyaay Nation is a federally recognized tribe of Mission Indians from Southern California, located in an unincorporated area of San Diego County just east of El Cajon. The Sycuan band are a Kumeyaay tribe, one of the four ethnic groups indigenous to San Diego County.

== Reservation and administration ==
Location of Sycuan Reservation

The Sycuan Reservation (Kumiai: Shekwaan) is located at 32°46′57″N 116°49′59″W. The nearest outside communities are the unincorporated communities of Dehesa, Harbison Canyon and Crest.

Cody Martinez is their current tribal chairman.

The band operates two waste water treatment plants, a sequencing batch reactor used for their casino, administrative buildings, and maintenance buildings. They also operate and own a modular treatment plant in a flood plain near one of their residential areas. The tribe operates a water treatment facility which controls their nitrate levels. Additionally, the tribe operates a small medical clinic, dental office, fire department and tribal police force. In 2005, they eliminated their environmental department for political and economic reasons. In 2004, they installed a new air conditioning system, internal control systems, and a new parking lot.

=== Demographics ===
Sycuan Reservation and Off-Reservation Trust Land, California – Racial and ethnic composition Note: the US Census treats Hispanic/Latino as an ethnic category. This table excludes Latinos from the racial categories and assigns them to a separate category. Hispanics/Latinos may be of any race.
Race / Ethnicity (NH = Non-Hispanic)	Pop 2000	Pop 2010	Pop 2020	% 2000	% 2010	% 2020
White alone (NH)	5	29	24	15.15%	13.74%	11.01%
Black or African American alone (NH)	0	5	9	0.00%	2.37%	4.13%
Native American or Alaska Native alone (NH)	15	78	87	45.45%	36.97%	39.91%
Asian alone (NH)	0	3	4	0.00%	1.42%	1.83%
Native Hawaiian or Pacific Islander alone (NH)	0	0	3	0.00%	0.00%	1.38%
Other race alone (NH)	0	0	0	0.00%	0.00%	0.00%
Mixed race or Multiracial (NH)	1	25	34	3.03%	11.85%	15.60%
Hispanic or Latino (any race)	12	71	57	36.36%	33.65%	26.15%
Total	33	211	218	100.00%	100.00%	100.00%

== Economic development ==
The move toward casino gaming on the Sycuan Band reservation was spearheaded by the Sycuan Band's former chairwoman, Anna Prieto Sandoval. The Sycuan Band opened its first gambling facility, the Sycuan Bingo Palace, on their reservation in 1983. As a direct evolution from that successful venture, they now run a profitable casino, as well as an off-reservation golf course. The Sycuan band is not the only San Diego-area band to operate significant commercial enterprises off-reservation.

The Sycuan band purchased the downtown San Diego landmark U. S. Grant Hotel in 2003.

The band advertises heavily in relation to the San Diego Padres of Major League Baseball (including both television and radio commercials during game broadcasts, and posted advertising at Petco Park, the team's ballpark). In 2023, Major League Soccer announced that an expansion team was granted to San Diego to begin play in 2025, bringing the league to 30 teams. The team, named San Diego FC, is co-owned by the Sycuan band, British-Egyptian businessman Mohamed Mansour, and professional baseball player Manny Machado.

=== Hotel casino resort expansion ===
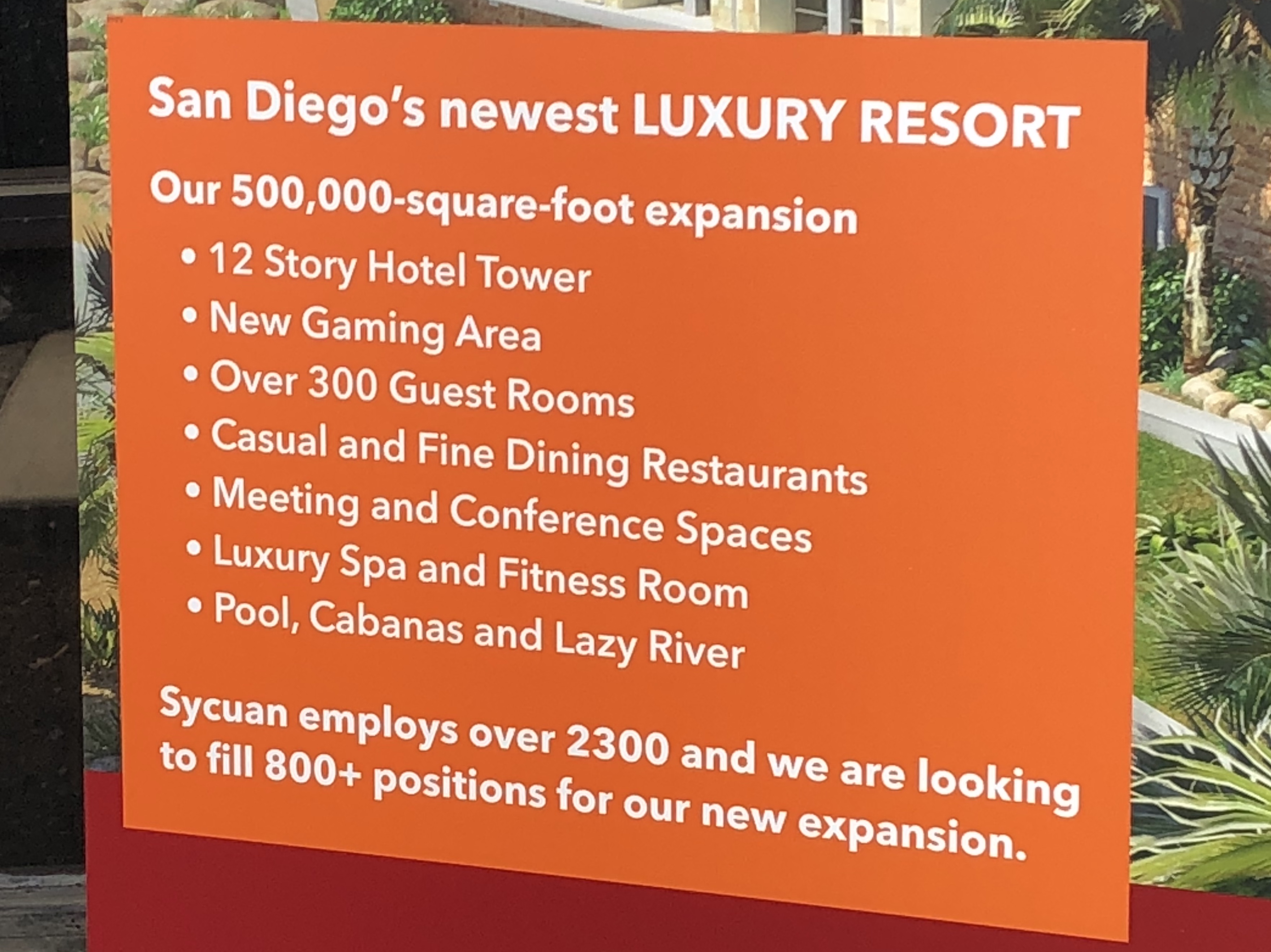
Notice board displayed by Sycuan Casino

A $226 million hotel casino expansion opened to the public on March 27, 2019. The casino has a total of 2800 slot machines and 80 gaming tables (blackjack, poker, etc).

=== Sycuan Institute on Tribal Gaming ===
The Sycuan band also provides an endowment to support the Sycuan Institute on Tribal Gaming, a research institute at San Diego State University.

== Education ==
Kumeyaay Community College was created by the Sycuan Band to serve the Kumeyaay-Diegueño Nation, and describes its mission as "to support cultural identity, sovereignty, and self-determination while meeting the needs of native and non-Native students." In addition, the reservation is served by Dehesa Elementary School District and Grossmont Union High School District.

== See also ==
- Kumeyaay
- Sycuan Institute on Tribal Gaming
- Mission Indians
