= Katherine Spilde =

American anthropologist

- Occupation: Anthropologist

Academic background
- Education: University of Hawaii at Manoa (BA); Columbian College of Arts and Sciences (MA); University of California, Riverside (PhD); University of California, Santa Cruz (MBA)
- Thesis: Acts of sovereignty, acts of identity: Negotiating interdependence through tribal government gaming on the White Earth Indian Reservation (1998)
- Doctoral advisor: Triloki Pandey
- Other advisor: Ruth Krulfeld

Academic work
- Sub-discipline: Tribal government gaming
- Institutions: Sycuan Institute on Tribal Gaming
- Website: katespilde.com

Katherine Ann Spilde is an American anthropologist. She is a professor and endowed chair of the Sycuan Institute on Tribal Gaming at San Diego State University, specializing in government-owned casino gambling models and Tribal Government Gaming.

== Early life and education ==
Spilde was raised in Mahnomen, Minnesota on White Earth Indian Reservation although she is not a tribal member. Her parents were teachers. Spilde completed a BA in anthropology at University of Hawaii at Manoa in 1991. She earned an MA in anthropology at George Washington's Columbian College of Arts and Sciences in 1993. Her master's thesis was advised by Ruth Krulfeld, and titled "I'm gonna get mines": drugs, ethics and hope on the streets of Washington, D.C. In 1998, Spilde became the third student to complete a Ph.D. in the cultural anthropology program at University of California, Santa Cruz. Her doctoral advisor was Triloki Pandey. Spidle's dissertation was titled Acts of sovereignty, acts of identity: Negotiating interdependence through tribal government gaming on the White Earth Indian Reservation. She earned an MBA in entrepreneurship from University of California, Riverside.

== Career ==
Spilde began as a policy analyst and writer for the National Gambling Impact Study Commission (NGISC). She was then appointed Director of Research for the National Indian Gaming Association (NIGA) in Washington, DC. She was a leading developer for the creation of the John F. Kennedy School of Government's National Indian Gaming Library and Resource Center.

In 2003, Spilde was hired as Executive Director for the Center of California Native Nations, and in 2008, she was named the Endowed Chair of the Sycuan Institute on Tribal Gaming at San Diego State University.
