= San Diego State University College of Professional Studies & Fine Arts =

Arts school of San Diego State University

College of Professional Studies and Fine Arts
- Type: Public
- Parent institution: San Diego State University
- Dean: Janis McKay
- Faculty: 435
- Students: 4,857
- Undergraduates: 4,537
- Postgraduates: 320
- Location: San Diego, California, U.S. 32.77445°N 117.07349°W
- Website: psfa.sdsu.edu

The College of Professional Studies and Fine Arts (PSFA) is an academic college of San Diego State University (SDSU) in San Diego, California.

== Academics ==
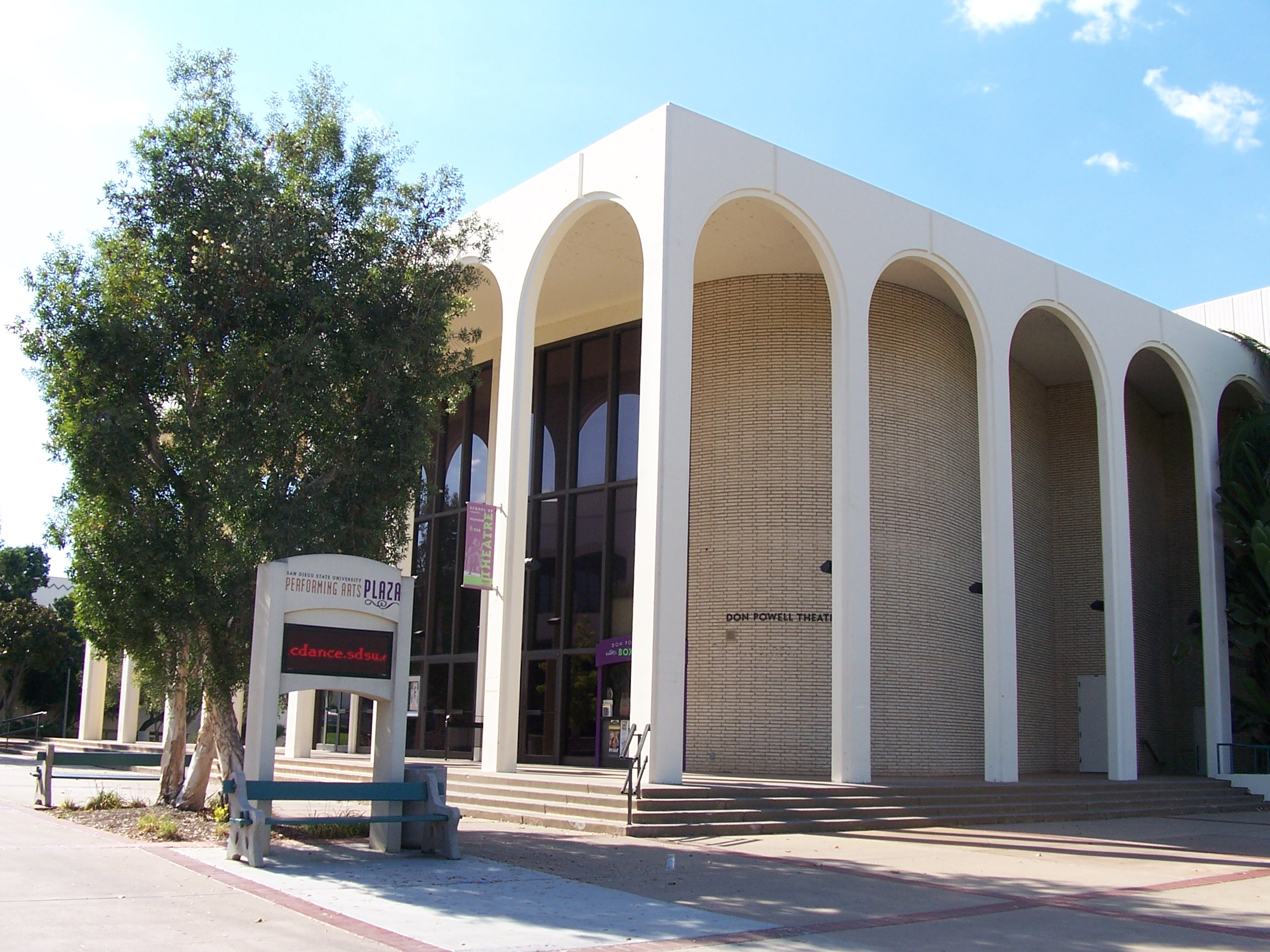
SDSU's Don Powell Theatre

=== Departments ===
The College of Professional Studies and Fine Arts includes several academic departments:

- Aerospace Studies (AFROTC)
- Art and Design
- City Planning
- Child & Family Development
- Communication
- Criminal Justice
- Exercise & Nutritional Sciences
- The L. Robert Payne School of Hospitality and Tourism Management
- International Security and Conflict Resolution
- Journalism & Media Studies (JMS)
- Military Science (ROTC)
- Music & Dance
- Naval Science (NROTC)
- Public Administration & Urban Studies
- Recreation, Parks and Tourism
- Theatre, Television and Film

=== Special programs ===
==== Institutes/Research Centers ====
- Berman Institute for Effective Communication
- Institute for Built Environment and Comparative Urban Research (BECUR)
- Center for Hospitality and Tourism Research
- International Center for Communications
- Institute for International Security and Conflict Resolution (ISCOR)
- Institute for Leisure Behavior
- Institute for Meetings and Events
- Institute of Public and Urban Affairs
- Institute for Surf Research
- Center for Visual and Performing Arts
- Center for Optimal Health and Performance
- Sycuan Institute on Tribal Gaming

==== Specialized libraries ====
- Audio / Visual Library

==== Facilities ====
- University Art Gallery
- Everett Gee Jackson Gallery
- Richard Anthony Marks Gallery
- Experimental Gallery
- Main Stage Theatre in the Performing Arts District
- Prebys Stage in the Performing Arts District
- Experimental Theatre in the Performing Arts District
- J. Dayton Smith Recital Hall in the Performing Arts District
- The Production Center for Documentary and Drama

== See also ==
- San Diego State University
