= Michel Alcan =

French politician (1810–1877)

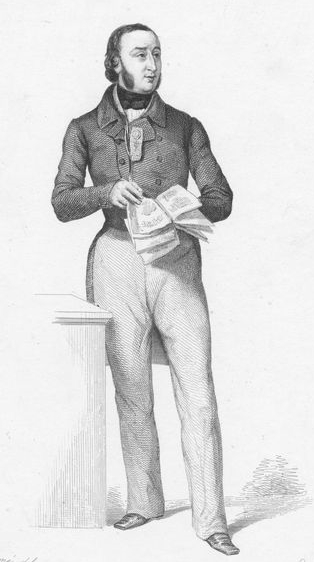
Michel Alcan at the National Assembly in 1848

Michel Alcan (21 May 1810 – 26 January 1877) was a French engineer, politician, and writer; born at Donnelay, in the department of Meurthe-et-Moselle, France, died at Paris. During his youth his merits as a mechanical engineer were recognized by the Society of the Friends of Labor, which awarded to him its silver medal. In Paris he took part in the political events connected with the revolutions of 1830 and 1848. In the latter year he was elected to the National Assembly, and voted with the advanced political party called "The Mountain." After his political career, he resumed his early studies and graduated from the École Centrale as engineer. In 1845 he was appointed professor of the arts of spinning and weaving in the Conservatoire des Arts et Métiers, which position he occupied until his death. In 1859 he was elected a member of the Jewish Consistory of Paris; in 1867, a member of the Central Consistory in place of Salomon Munk.

Among his works are: Essai sur l'Industrie des Matières Textiles, 1847; 2d ed., 1859; La Fabrication des Étoffes, Traité Complet de la Filature du Coton, 1864; Traité du Travail des Laines, 1866; Traité du Travail des Laines Peignées, 1873, etc.
