= Gordon Dallas =

South African-American soccer player

Personal information
- Date of birth: 13 February 1959 (age 67)
- Place of birth: Durban, South Africa
- Height: 6 ft 1 in (1.85 m)
- Position: Defender

Youth career
- 1977–1980: San Diego State Aztecs

Senior career*
Years	Team	Apps	(Gls)
1981–1983	San Diego Sockers	37	(1)
1981–1982	San Diego Sockers (indoor)	16	(2)
1983	Fort Lauderdale Strikers	1	(0)
- * Club domestic league appearances and goals

Gordon Dallas (born 13 February 1959 in Durban) is a retired South African-American soccer defender who played three seasons in the North American Soccer League.

Gordon, a native of South Africa, attended high school in San Diego where he played soccer and ran cross country. He played on the San Diego State University men's soccer team from 1977 to 1980. In 1981, he signed with the San Diego Sockers of the North American Soccer League. The Sockers released him at the end of the 1982 season. In March 1983, he had an unsuccessful trial with the Fort Lauderdale Strikers before rejoining the Sockers. In August 1983, the Sockers traded him to the Strikers in exchange for a draft pick.
