= John Sharper =

American basketball player

Free agent
- Position: Shooting guard

Personal information
- Born: April 23, 1984 (age 42) Oakland, California
- Listed height: 6 ft 1 in (1.85 m)
- Listed weight: 190 lb (86 kg)

Career information
- High school: Saint Mary's (Berkeley, California)
- College: San Diego State (2002–2006)
- NBA draft: 2006: undrafted
- Playing career: 2006–present

Career history
- 2006–2007: San Diego Wildcats
- 2007–2008: Budivelnyk
- 2009–2010: ENAD
- 2010: Ironi Ramat Gan
- 2010–2011: BBC Monthey
- 2011–2012: Ironi Ramat Gan
- 2012: Basket-club Boncourt
- 2012–2013: Rabotnički
- 2014: Karpoš Sokoli

John Sharper (born April 23, 1984) is a former American professional basketball player who last played for Karpoš Sokoli of the Macedonian First League.

== Professional career ==
Not being drafted by any NBA team and being unknown in Europe, Sharper signed for the 2006-07 season with the ABA club San Diego Wildcats. During his career, Sharper played in Ukraine, Cyprus, Switzerland, Israel, and Macedonia.
