= Dehesa School District =

School district in California, United States

Address
- 4612 Dehesa Road El Cajon, California, 92019; United States

District information
- Type: Public
- Grades: K–12
- Established: April 5, 1876
- Superintendent: Bradley Johnson
- Schools: 1
- NCES District ID: 0610710

Students and staff
- Students: 124 (2020–2021)
- Teachers: 7.0 (FTE)
- Staff: 9.0 (FTE)
- Student–teacher ratio: 17.71:1

Other information
- Website: www.dehesasd.net

Dehesa School District is a public school district based in the rural East County area of San Diego County, California, United States. It consists of one school serving grades kindergarten through 8th grade, including TK/EAK.

== About ==
The superintendent is Bradley Johnson. The district is governed by an elected five-member board. The principal is Hee-Jin Peterson.

The computer science curriculum for grades K-6 is divided into trimesters. The first trimester is Scratch (entry-level coding). The second trimester is robotics building and programming using Lego Mindstorm EV3 Robots. The third trimester is Minecraft coding, where students learn to program using the Java language. The curriculum for 7th and 8th graders focuses on HTML5, CSS, JavaScript, and Python using a program called Codesters. Every trimester ends in an "Epic Build" where students showcase their work to their families.

Founded on April 5, 1876, it is one of the oldest school districts in San Diego County.
