= Erika De La Cruz =

Mexican-American TV personality

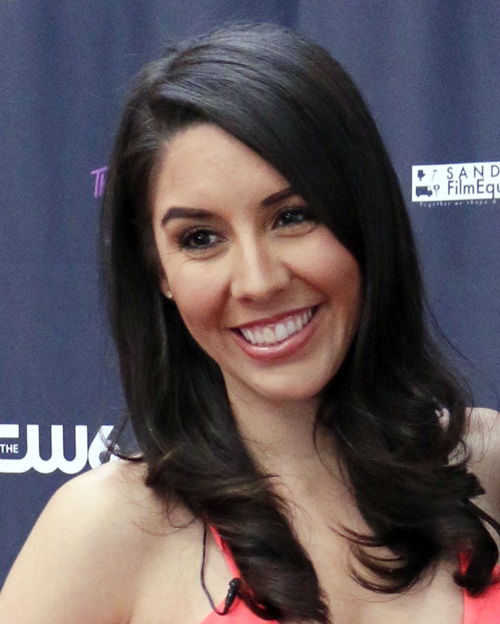
- De La Cruz at the San Diego Film Awards
- Education: San Diego State University
- Occupations: TV host; speaker
- Known for: The LA Girl; Passionistas; Fashion Week San Diego; Passion to Paycheck
- Website: erikadelacruz.com

Erika De La Cruz is a Mexican-American TV host, bestselling author and media personality best known for The LA Girl and Passionistas: Tips Tales & Tweetables from Women Pursuing their Dreams.

== Career ==
De La Cruz started her career as brand ambassador of Fashion Week San Diego and covering radio events for KIFM, easy 98.1. She founded Passion to Paycheck, which addresses mental health awareness, and is the author of the bestseller Passionistas: Tips Tales & Tweetables from Women Pursuing their Dreams. De La Cruz works with Connected Women of Influence, Susan G. Komen and is a keynote SUE Talks speaker. She was cast on Dream Life with Caitlyn Jenner.

=== The LA Girl ===
The LA Girl was founded in 2014. After five years, the original founder was pursuing other goals and asked De La Cruz if she wanted the job. In 2021, De La Cruz became editor in chief.

== Personal life ==
De La Cruz is a Mexican-American who was raised in Northern California. With a background in red carpet hosting, she graduated with a film and fashion degree from San Diego State University.
