= Dunley =

Dunley may refer to two places in England:

- Dunley, Hampshire
- Dunley, Worcestershire

== See also ==
- Dunlay, Texas
