= Sheryl Palmer =

American business executive and CEO of Taylor Morrison (since 2007)

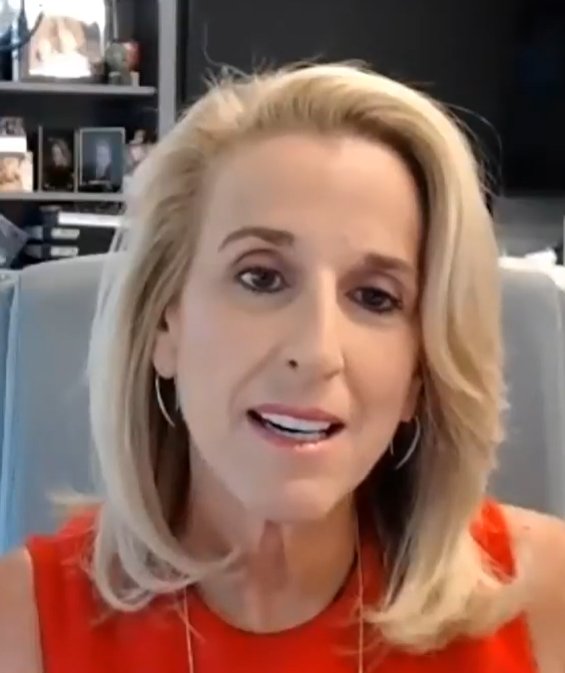
- Palmer in 2020
- Born: Los Angeles, California, US
- Education: San Diego State University
- Occupations: Marketer and business executive
- Organization(s): Chairman and CEO of Taylor Morrison (since 2007)

Sheryl Palmer is an American marketer and business executive best known for serving as the chief executive officer and chairman of homebuilder Taylor Morrison, a role she has held since 2007, when the company was formed. She is the only female CEO of a publicly traded homebuilder.

== Biography ==
Palmer was born in Los Angeles but grew up moving around due to her mother working as a fashion designer. She began working at McDonald's at 15, and by 20, while she was enrolled at San Diego State University studying special education, became the Marketing Manager for San Diego of McDonalds.

She then worked at a marketing agency with a major homebuilder client, before joining Irvine Company and then Blackwood Corp, both homebuilders. She then joined PulteGroup.

After this, she took a year off and considered retiring but was tapped by Morrison Homes to serve as their Western Region President. After they fused with Taylor Woodrow to form Taylor Morrison, she was soon tapped to serve as the company's CEO. She led the company through the subprime mortgage crisis in 2007, which occurred just as she was becoming CEO. Under her leadership, however, the company rebuilt and, after a stint in private equity starting in 2010—during which she resigned for about a day because of what she saw as a lack of trust from the owners before returning—went public in 2013, opening 20% higher than expected. She is the only female CEO of a publicly traded homebuilder. Under her leadership, the company has been in the Fortune 500.

As CEO, she has emphasized "loving the customer", a philosophy that includes getting to know each and every customer and maintaining a diverse staff to be prepared for customers with diverse needs and cultures. In particular, she has led Taylor Morrison to have 44% of its employees be women, far more than the average in homebuilders. She also announced that Taylor Morrison would provide an ownership stake to every one of the employees, not merely executives. She ran an internal video blog called "Shoes Off with Sheryl", named for her dislike of shoes.

She has led Taylor Morrison through its acquisition by Berkshire Hathaway and will remain CEO after the acquisition is finalized.

She has also interviewed individuals including George W. Bush, Steve Case, Donna Brazile, Karl Rove, and Michelle Obama. She has served as chairman of the board of HomeAid.

She was named Executive of the Year by the W. P. Carey School of Business in 2021. She was named a 2025 CNBC Changemaker. That same year, she was named to Forbes's 50 Over 50.
