= Anna Prieto Sandoval =

Sycuan Band of the Kumeyaay Nation leader

Personal details
- Born: May 14, 1934 Sycuan Band of the Kumeyaay Nation Reservation
- Died: October 28, 2010 (aged 76) Sycuan Band of the Kumeyaay Nation Reservation
- Children: Five children
- Known for: Native American gaming pioneer who improved housing and helped lift her reservation out of poverty
- Awards: Inducted into the San Diego Women's Hall Of Fame, 2010

Anna Prieto Sandoval (May 14, 1934 – October 28, 2010) was an American leader of the Sycuan Band of the Kumeyaay Nation of Southern California and a Native American gaming enterprises pioneer. She is credited with lifting the Sycuan Band reservation, which was plagued by poverty and substandard housing, to self-sufficiency by pioneering casino gambling on the reservation.

== Background ==
Sandoval was born on May 14, 1934, on the Sycuan Band of the Kumeyaay Nation reservation. She grew up speaking the Kumeyaay language as her first language. Her mother, Ada Prieto, was also born on the Sycuan reservation. Sandoval attended Dehesa Elementary and Grossmont High School in El Cajon, California.

Sandoval was married twice and raised five children. Her first marriage, which occurred in 1953, ended in divorce. She attended Grossmont College in El Cajon after raising her children. Sandoval later taught the Kumeyaay language at San Diego State University.

== Leadership ==
Sandoval became the chairwoman of the Sycuan Band of the Kumeyaay Nation in 1972. In 1972, the year she took office, none of the eighty Sycuan members who resided on the reservation had full-time employment. The housing on the reservation lacked indoor plumbing, with a small meeting hall and a deteriorating one-hundred-year-old Catholic Church. Most structures on the reservation were dilapidated.

After the state of California allowed Native American tribes to open gambling operations, Sandoval was approached by Pan American International, which operated a Seminole bingo hall in Florida at the time, with a proposal to open a bingo hall on Sycuan land. Sandoval then spearheaded the Sycuan Band's transition from poverty. She overcame initial resistance from the Sycuan tribal council regarding the idea of opening a bingo hall on reservation land. Members were concerned about potential pollution and large numbers of people swamping the small reservation.

Sandoval opened the Sycuan Bingo Palace in 1983 after several years of preparation and negotiations. The new operation quickly grossed higher revenues and profits than initially expected.

In 1987, Sandoval and the Sycuan Band broke away from Pan American International and began to run the Sycuan Bingo Palace independently. Under Sandoval, the tribe constructed a new 68,000-square-foot (6,300 m^{2}) casino, which opened to the public in 1990. The Sycuan Band used the revenues from the casino to build new facilities on the reservation, including a new fire station, church and clinic. Unemployment, which had been rampant on the reservation before gaming, became nonexistent and the Sycuan Band of the Kumeyaay Nation became one of the wealthiest tribes in the United States. The Sycuan Band also became one of the largest employers in San Diego County. Likewise, Sandoval became one of the wealthiest Native Americans in California due to the windfall from the casino.

== Controversy ==
Despite the new prosperity, Sandoval alienated some Sycuan Band members during her tenure as chairwoman. In 1991, she lost her re-election by just three votes. She later expressed regret that the increased prosperity had come at the expense of traditional Kumeyaay values and culture.

== Death and legacy ==
Anna Prieto Sandoval died of complications of diabetes at her home on the Sycuan band reservation on October 28, 2010, at the age of 76. Most of Sandoval's possessions and clothing were burned in accordance with Kumeyaay traditions.

She had three sons and two daughters.

== Honor ==
Anna Prieto Sandoval was nominated and inducted into the San Diego Women's Hall Of Fame in 2010 hosted by Women's Museum of California, Commission on the Status of Women, University of California, San Diego Women's Center, and San Diego State University Women's Studies.
