= Steve Yuhas =

American conservative radio personality (born 1973)

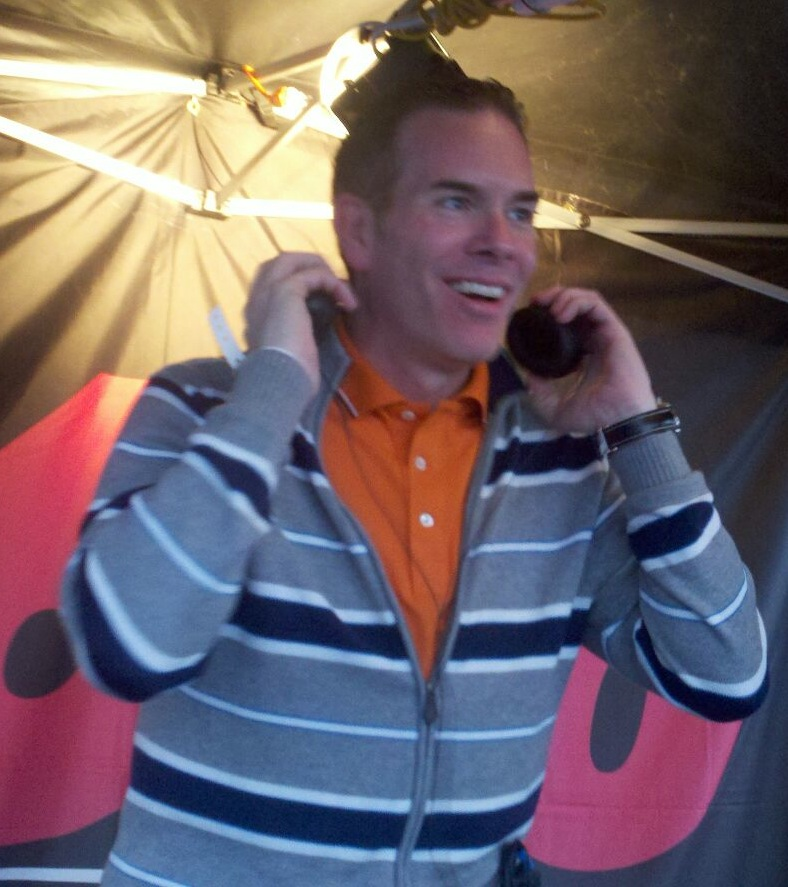
- Yuhas hosting radio event for radio station on July 4, 2014
- Born: February 4, 1973 (age 53); New York, New York, U.S.
- Education: San Diego State University; London School of Economics
- Occupations: Radio host/television host, political commentator, author
- Employer(s): Clear Channel Communications, Fox News Channel
- Known for: Political commentator
- Political party: Independent
- Website: www.steveyuhas.com

Steve Yuhas (born February 4, 1973) is a conservative radio personality in Southern California. He is a frequent guest on radio and television programs and contributes to a myriad of newspapers and magazines. The Steve Yuhas Show airs on News Radio 600 KOGO. The moniker of the program produced by Clear Channel Communications is 'Uniquely Conservative Talk Radio' and is registered with the U.S. Patent and Trademark Office.

== Biography ==
Steve Yuhas (born February 4, 1973) is from New York City, New York. He served nearly eight years in the United States Army and Marine Corps and received an honorable discharge. According to Yuhas' DD214 (as well as several DD215's - administrative corrections to the DD214) filed with Los Angeles County and examined by the Los Angeles Times celebrity reporter Denise Martin, Yuhas first served as a combat medic with the United States Army and transferred to the United States Marine Corps, serving as a legal officer. Yuhas sustained a spine injury while on active duty that ended his military career.

Biographical information from his personnel file shows he entered the military in Los Angeles and his home of record at the time of his entry and exit from active duty was in Malibu, California. His awards include the Bronze Star Medal, Meritorious Service Medal, the Army Commendation Medal with Silver Oak Leaf Cluster, the Navy and Marine Corps Commendation Medal with three Oak Leaf Clusters, two Army and one Marine Corps Good Conduct Medals, the Air Assault Badge and other awards qualification badges. Yuhas was also awarded the Combat Medical Badge and the Expert Field Medical Badge. His first duty station was in Babenhausen, Germany (returned to the German government in 2007) and his last was Marine Corps Base Camp Pendleton, a large Marine Corps installation about 50 miles north of San Diego, CA.

== Politics and radio ==
Yuhas was co-chair of Gays for Proposition 22 and supported California's Proposition 22. This was an anti-gay marriage law which passed in 2000. He appeared on several national and international television programs to discuss his support. During an appearance on Larry King Live, Yuhas said that his support for the measure was not because it was about being gay, but because it is the right of the people in a state to decide important issues such as who should be married.

Yuhas says he is a "strict constructionist" with regard to issues of law and the United States Constitution. He agrees with United States Supreme Court Justices Clarence Thomas and Antonin Scalia. Further, on his radio program and during television appearances he supported the nominations of Chief Justice John Roberts and Justice Samuel Alito (both appointed by George W. Bush). Yuhas wrote: "If gays believe that the line between gay marriage and heterosexual marriage is arbitrary and baseless, why then should there be any line at all? Either society has a right to set limits and standards on marriage or it doesn't. I think it does, and I think that the line should be drawn where it always has been: and that is to say that marriage is a heterosexual institution." Yuhas came out on July 1, 2012, after the Supreme Court handed down the decision in the Affordable Care Act and lambasted Chief Justice John Roberts and the opinion he drafted as an "end to the way America used to be." He further said that the decision "eroded the way the Founding Fathers thought the Courts of the country should operate" and that the Congress should "reign them in." His barbs were not left there as he opined in an opinion column in the San Francisco Chronicle that the House of Representatives should, "Reverse this decision because John Roberts handed the Republican members a gift by declaring this monster a tax. Taxes must start in the House of Representatives, they must be continued in the House and no Congress can bind the hands of another." He finished by telling GOP members to "kill this thing now."

In November 2008, Yuhas lent his name and financial support to anti-marriage forces and is listed as a contributor to the Yes on 8 campaign in the amount of $27,500.

Yuhas openly rejects the civil rights argument of gay and lesbian people. "If you have to go out of your way and tell people that you are gay or somebody thinks that you're feminine or whatever, well, I'm sorry, that's not the same as being a black guy who has to face the horrors of racism every day of his life in some places." He goes further by saying that LGBT individuals cannot be compared to the African American civil rights struggle because being black is "immutable," but you cannot look at a person and know they are gay. Yuhas has been berated by gay advocacy groups for saying things like that and even had to fend off a formal Federal Communications Commission (FCC) complaint for using alleged homophobic slurs over the public airwaves. The latter complaint was because Yuhas has a sometimes-segment on his program called the "Extraordinary Gay Update" where he urges gay people not to use words that "we demand others purge from their vocabulary" as we use the words about ourselves.

On his program on October 4, 2009, he was accused of being a "shill for Israel" and a blogger wrote that Yuhas' frequent guests of Israeli officials, make him unable to be objective on the issue. Yuhas responded by telling the listener that he does not pretend to be objective and has a "vested interest" in the survival of the Israeli state. Yuhas is a member of Sinai Temple, a synagogue located in the affluent Beverly Glen area of Los Angeles. Yuhas has also said, "I reject the notion of the removal of chaplains from the military, but I am positively opposed to a chaplain recruiting from a captive audience, only to have his conversions become fodder for The Baptist Press' recruiting efforts," Yuhas wrote in The Jewish Journal of Greater Los Angeles. His support for Israel and the Israel Defense Forces is often in conflict when one considers Yuhas served in the United States military, but seems to side more with Israel than the United States.

Yuhas said on his program and in the Los Angeles Jewish Journal that he voted for the "best candidate" and supported Hillary Clinton during the 2008 presidential election.

After winning the Iowa Straw Poll in 2011 Yuhas told his radio audience that he gave a political contribution to Michele Bachmann, despite her open hostility to the LGBT community and her husband's role in "curing" LGBT people through his health clinic. When pressed by a caller for his choice for the GOP nomination to oppose President Barack Obama in 2012, Yuhas said, "So long as the GOP nominates somebody that can beat President Obama, I'm good."

In June 2015, the Washington Post published an article about wealthy Californians balking at water use cuts in a wealthy neighborhood. Yuhas' quotes were featured in the title and "We're not all equal when it comes to water" became a tagline on every news outlet in America. Bill Maher ripped Yuhas on his program in talking about the ultra-wealthy and Maher baited Yuhas by calling him a racist.

== Legal controversies ==
In December 2008, Yuhas was sued by high school principal Michael J. Rood. During a broadcast, Rood alleged Yuhas defamed him and invaded his privacy by inquiring about the school district where Rood was employed. Yuhas claimed what he said was true and that his opinion that Rood worked as an associate publisher of a pornographic magazine while on duty at his school while using school resources was true and protected. Yuhas filed a Strategic Lawsuit Against Public Participation to dismiss the case as a protected speech. Yuhas was represented by high-profile First Amendment attorney Guylyn Cummins and James Chadwick.

In December 2009, San Diego Superior Court Judge Judith F. Hayes ruled in favor of Yuhas. Rood appealed on the claim that Hayes' decision was wrong on the law and the Constitution protected Rood. On June 3, 2011, a unanimous panel for the California Court of Appeals rejected Rood's argument and ruled in Yuhas' favor. Writing in the Reporters Committee for the Freedom of the Press, Aaron Mackey wrote, that the Appeals Court, "(R)ejected arguments from the former principal that the commentator’s report on the audit conducted by school officials did not qualify for a state law that protects journalists who report on government proceedings." Cummins said, "[The decision] demonstrates why privileges are important to journalists and why the anti-SLAPP statute is important to journalists." Rood appealed to the Supreme Court and ultimately filed for bankruptcy.

The decision set an important precedent for radio talk show commentators, effectively granting them the same protections to shield sources and to respond to lawsuits as a journalist working a beat—not surprisingly the rule is known as the "Yuhas exception" that excepts talk show hosts and commentators from lawsuits as the courts would any other journalist provided they are reporting news and the story is true.

== International radio and television ==
On television and radio stations, Steve Yuhas continues to be a feature guest discussing issues from security matters to social issues. His radio audience is predominantly conservative, but there are a great deal of self-identified libertarian listeners, and Yuhas frequently debates with those with whom he disagrees. Television and radio often pit Yuhas against other radio and television pundits. Yuhas had consistently high ratings, according to various rating organizations, reflecting a diversity of thought for this openly gay conservative.

Yuhas gained worldwide criticism for his harsh reporting regarding the disappearance of Alabama resident Natalee Holloway in Aruba. In the newspaper El Diario La Prensa, Yuhas wrote (translated to English - uncorrected syntax): "Beth Twitty comes across to the people of Alabama as a sympathetic character, and she is because she can’t find her daughter, but to much of America and the world she is an abrasive and rude woman whose disdain for the people of Aruba overshadows the goodwill that was initially shown to her in the opening days of this soap opera. Her following people around with television cameras in tow to confront people that she suspects had something to do with her daughters demise has become fodder for virtually everyone not within 500 miles of Mountain Brook, Alabama."

Yuhas is featured in The Unrevealed Time Lies, a documentary film by Dutch filmmaker, Renée Gielen. Many news organizations picked up Yuhas' comments and columns about Natalee Holloway, especially after the arrest and conviction of Joran van der Sloot. Yuhas wrote about the unaccountability of the search funds collected by the family and that caused some to question where the many hundreds of thousands of dollars were being spent. On Rita Cosby's program on MSNBC, Yuhas was scolded by another talk show host after he refused to endorse a boycott of Aruba.

== Being conservative and an LGBT American ==
Yuhas got his start in radio as a guest host for Roger Hedgecock after he was fired for being too conservative from a gay newspaper.

Though he is considered out of the mainstream for political gay thought, Yuhas is featured as a "queer" columnist on the website Lavender But Not Pink and other gay websites where his brand of political thinking would have been considered taboo just a few years ago. Yuhas stated in 2004 that it is "quickly becoming more and more acceptable to be a conservative thinker and gay and the Internet has allowed an explosion of conservative gay thinkers to be able to reach people" quickly. An article in The Washington Blade says that Yuhas "is one of the most well-known gay political thinkers - even if his thinking is backward."

In 2005, Yuhas began appearing on red-carpet events and awards shows. He was also photographed at many charity and political events. Although he does not talk about his giving publicly and even though some have assigned him the moniker "self-hating gay" or "homophobe", he continues to primarily report on serious issues of local and national importance.

Following the desire for a photo with his military boyfriend and himself and joining with other public figures, Yuhas testified at the California House regarding the need for celebrity protection from paparazzi. He said, "I understand there is a need for people to know what public figures are doing... but the delicate balance between people's right to know and the right of public figures to have some degree of privacy should not be too much to ask." He added, "I should not worry that somebody is hanging out in my backyard while my family is watching television" (referencing an event that led to a police report being filed in Beverly Hills after Yuhas was photographed in his home with his boyfriend).

During an appearance on Hannity on the Fox News Channel, Yuhas said he was wrong about the repeal of Don't Ask; Don't Tell. "I'm not afraid of saying I made a mistake and in this case, I was wrong. There does not seem to be a problem in the military regarding unit stability as it relates to openly gay troops." He added, "There have always been gay people in the military, we all know that, and those of us who thought lifting DADT would be disruptive were wrong."

When the United States Supreme Court issued its landmark ruling legalizing gay marriage across the United States, striking down state laws concerning gay marriage, Yuhas called it a "blasphemy on the Constitution" and a decision "pulled out of thin air by five Justices who decided they did not like the democratic process." Asked by conservative television host Rick Amato his thoughts about the Obama White House lighting the White House like a rainbow, Yuhas made clear his concern, "Where is the President and his lighting manager when men and women in uniform are killed or wounded? I've never seen the White House lit in camouflage to welcome them home... it's pandering and I hate pandering."

== Political and charity ==
Yuhas is known for charity giving and he was chronicled in the North County Times as the most prolific political contributor to the Republican Party in the media today. Since Yuhas began writing opinion columns and during his tenure on the radio, his giving to political campaigns and political parties amounted to almost $120,000 to conservative causes and candidates.

Yuhas is also in attendance at many charity events including cancer research and he has asked his listeners to donate to PanCAN - Pancreatic Cancer Action Network. It is unclear why he took up the passion for this particular cancer, but he has both written about it and talked about it publicly on his radio program on KOGO. Yuhas embraced several charitable causes on his radio program and recently began advocating for another group, Homefront San Diego, an organization to assist low ranking members of the military obtain money, cars, food and shelter in the event they cannot afford it.
