= Dunalley =

Dunalley may refer to:

- Baron Dunalley, of Kilboy in the County of Tipperary, is a title in the Peerage of Ireland
- Henry Prittie, 1st Baron Dunalley (1743–1801), Irish peer and Member of Parliament
- Henry Prittie, 2nd Baron Dunalley (1775–1854), Anglo-Irish politician
- Henry Prittie, 4th Baron Dunalley (1851–1927), Anglo-Irish peer
- Dunalley, Tasmania
