= Samuel Kounaves =

American researcher, academic and author

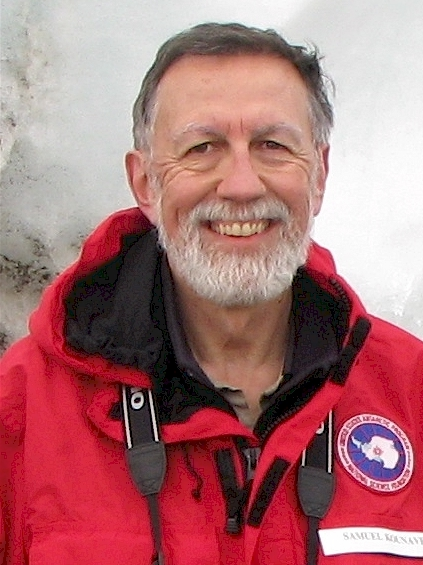
- Occupations: Scientist, academic and author

Academic background
- Education: California State University at San Diego; University of Geneva
- Doctoral advisor: Jacques Buffle

Academic work
- Institutions: Tufts University

Samuel Kounaves is an American scientist, academic and author. He is a Professor of Chemistry at Tufts University, a visiting professor at Imperial College London, and an affiliate scientist at NASA's Jet Propulsion Laboratory.

Kounaves' research efforts have been focused on the development and application of micro-electroanalytical sensors and techniques for environmental and planetary chemical analysis, and in studying the UV-driven "fragmentation" patterns of altered biogenic compounds on Mars which could then be used to identify the original biomarker and thus could provide evidence for life on Mars. Some of his research has dealt with the electrochemical analyses of the soil/ice constituents of Earth and Mars. He has written over 120 articles.

Kounaves is a fellow of the American Association for the Advancement of Science, of the Royal Society of Chemistry and of The Geological Society. In 2019, he received the ACS Kavli Foundation Award for innovations in Chemistry.

== Education ==
Kounaves received his BS in Chemistry in 1975 and his MS in Chemistry in 1978, both from California State University at San Diego. At the time, he was working as a research chemist at the U.S. Naval Ocean Systems Center. He received his PhD (DSc) from the University of Geneva in 1985 under the guidance of Jacques Buffle, while working for two years as a Scientific Associate at the European Organization for Nuclear Research (CERN). There he was part of the team led by Tim Berners-Lee that developed the hypertext PS-Sequence software for control the proton-synchrotron beam using what was to become HTML and the WWW. He subsequently did a post-doctoral fellowship at SUNY Buffalo with Janet Osteryoung in 1986, and the following two years at Harvard University School of Medicine with James Young.

== Career ==
In 1988, Kounaves joined the Department of Chemistry at Tufts University as an assistant professor, becoming associate professor in 1994 and full professor in 2012. From 1994 to 2002, he was a faculty researcher at the Center for Field Analytical Studies & Technology, and from 2008 to 2021 an adjunct professor in the Department of Earth & Ocean Sciences.

=== Research and work ===
In the 1980 and 90's, Kounaves' research efforts were focused on the development and application of micro-electroanalytical sensors and techniques for environmental analysis. He demonstrated that a microlithographcally fabricated iridium-based ultramicroelectrode (Ir-UME) array can be constructed and used in conjunction with square wave anodic stripping voltammetry (SWASV), to rapidly and accurately measure environmentally significant heavy metals in natural waters at concentrations in the ppb range. He also carried out basic scientific studies involving the analytical utility of the Ir-UME, the effects of electrode surface morphology on the electrochemical signal, and the theoretical derivation and numerical simulation of the SWASV technique at the Ir-UME.

He also demonstrated the utility of Ir-UME sensors for rapid in-situ determination in natural water of copper, lead, cadmium and zinc, selenium, nickel, arsenic, for direct determination of copper and mercury, and developed a unique solid-state reference electrode to use with in-situ measurements. In parallel with the application of these sensors, Kounaves also conducted fundamental studies to understand the effects of the fabrication materials, the effects of mercury deposition on surface degradation, the failure of Ir-UMEs in chloride media and the surface effects on electron transfer rates.

In 2003, Kounaves, as part of a team, was chosen by NASA as a Co-Investigator to lead the 2007 Phoenix Mars Scout Lander mission and as the Lead Investigator (PI) for the wet chemistry experiments. As part of the Phoenix science team, he was responsible for and led the chemical investigation and interpretation of the Mars Wet Chemistry Lab (WCL) inorganic and electrochemical analyses of the soil/ice constituents, their relationship to past/present Martian geochemistry, and the potential of the Martian environment to support microbial life. As Co-PI and Lead Scientist for WCL onboard NASA's Phoenix Mars Lander, Kounaves and his group performed the first wet chemical analysis of Martian soil. The experiments revealed an alkaline soil containing a variety of soluble minerals, but most surprising was the discovery of almost 1% perchlorate, (ClO^{−}_{4}).

After discovering ClO^{−}_{4} on Mars, Kounaves group began investigating the same possibility in Antarctica's McMurdo Dry Valleys. Their research provided the evidence of the ubiquitous natural formation of perchlorate on Earth, with accumulation in arid environments and global atmospheric production. Their discovery supports the hypothesis that the perchlorate reducing bacteria and archaea may be a remnant of a significant pre-oxygen Earth perchlorate ecosystem. In later work, Kounaves and his team confirmed the presence of ClO^{−}_{4}, ClO^{−}_{3}, and NO^{−}_{3}, in the Mars EETA79001 and Tissint meteorites, and also in lunar and chondrite meteorites.

Some of Kounaves' recent NASA funded research deals with: understanding the geochemical and environmental history of Mars as recorded by the chemistry of its surface materials; the chemistry of the UV-driven production of perchlorate; how biologically-produced molecules (biomarkers) are altered when exposed to solar UV radiation in the presence of oxychlorines and the use of their "fragmentation" patterns to identify the original biomarker and thus provide evidence for life on Mars; and the geobiochemistry in extreme environments on Earth in places such as the McMurdo and other Antarctica Dry Valleys, Death Valley, the Tindouf Basin (Morocco), and the Atacama Desert (Chile). His group has recently reported on the first growth of terrestrial bacteria in an actual martian regolith (soil) in the form of Mars meteorite EETA79001. His group has also been funded by major NASA COLDTech and ICEE2 grants to develop a chemical sensor array to study the geochemistry, subglacial ocean chemistry, and habitability of Saturn's moon Enceladus by analysis of the ejected plume material and the surface ice on Europa.

== Awards and honors ==
- 1986 - National Research Council, Research Fellowship
- 1990 - Tufts Junior Faculty Fellowship
- 2006 - Arno Heyn Memorial Award, NE Section of the American Chemical Society
- 2006 - Wood Colloquium Lecture, Aerospace Sciences, University of Colorado
- 2008 - Massachusetts Columbus Quincentennial Exploration & Discovery Award for Innovative Achievement
- 2009 - John L. "Jack" Swigert Jr., Award for Space Exploration as member of the Phoenix Mars Mission Team
- 2009 - NASA Group Achievement Award for Development and Operation of the Phoenix Spacecraft Leading to the First Landing in the Martian Arctic
- 2009 - NASA Group Achievement Award for Outstanding Performance in the Planning and Execution of the Science for the Phoenix Mars Mission
- 2013 - Fellow, American Association for the Advancement of Science
- 2015 - Fellow, Royal Society of Chemistry
- 2016 - Fellow, The Geological Society
- 2019 - NASA Exceptional Achievement Award for New Opportunities to ELSHA Team
- 2019 - ACS-Kavli Award for Innovations in Chemistry

== Selected papers ==
- Boynton, W. V., Ming, D. W., Kounaves, S. P., Young, S. M. M., Arvidson, R. E., Hecht, M. H., Morris, R. V. (2009). Evidence for Calcium Carbonate at the Mars Phoenix Landing Site. Science, 325(5936), 61–64.
- Carrier, B. L. & Kounaves, S. P. (2015) The Origins of Perchlorate in the Martian Soil. Geophysical Research Letters, 42, 3739-3745
- Catling, D. C., Claire, M. W., Zahnle, K. J., Quinn, R. C., Clark, B. C., Hecht, M. H., & Kounaves, S. (2010). Atmospheric origins of perchlorate on Mars and in the Atacama. Journal of Geophysical Research, 115.
- Feeney, R., & Kounaves, S. P. (2000). On-Site Analysis of Arsenic in Groundwater Using a Microfabricated Gold Ultramicroelectrode Array. Analytical Chemistry, 72(10), 2222–2228.
- Hecht, M. H., Kounaves, S. P., Quinn, R. C., West, S. J., Young, S. M. M., Ming, D. W., ... Smith, P. H. (2009). Detection of Perchlorate and the Soluble Chemistry of Martian Soil at the Phoenix Lander Site. Science, 325(5936), 64–67.
- Herdan, J., Feeney, R., Kounaves, S. P., Flannery, A. F., Storment, C. W., Kovacs, G. T. A., & Darling, R. B. (1998). Field Evaluation of an Electrochemical Probe for in Situ Screening of Heavy Metals in Groundwater. Environmental Science & Technology, 32(1), 131–136.
- Kounaves, S. P., Stroble, S. T., Anderson, R. M., Moore, Q., Catling, D. C., Douglas, S., ... Zent, A. P. (2010). Discovery of Natural Perchlorate in the Antarctic Dry Valleys and Its Global Implications. Environmental Science & Technology, 44(7), 2360–2364.
- Kounaves, S. P., Hecht, M. H., Kapit, J., Gospodinova, K., DeFlores, L., ... Young, S. M. (2010) The Wet Chemistry Experiments on the 2007 Phoenix Mars Scout Lander Mission: Data Analysis and Results. Journal of Geophysical Research, 115, E00E10.
- Maus, D.J., J. Heinz, J. Schirmack, J., Airo, A., Kounaves, S. P., Wagner, D., & Schulze-Makuch, D. (2020). Methanogenic Archaea Can Produce Methane in Deliquescence-Driven Mars Analog Environments, Nature Science Reports, 10(6).
- Naz, N., Harandi, B. F., Newmark, J. & Kounaves, S. P. (2023) Microbial growth in actual martian regolith in the form of Mars meteorite EETA79001, Nature Comm. Earth & Env., 4:381, doi:10.1038/s43247-023-01042-7.
- Nolan, M. A., & Kounaves, S. P. (1999). Microfabricated Array of Iridium Microdisks as a Substrate for Direct Determination of Cu2 or Hg2 Using Square-Wave Anodic Stripping Voltammetry. Analytical Chemistry, 71(16), 3567–3573.
