= Sycuan Institute on Tribal Gaming =

Coordinates: 32.7719°N 117.0727°W

- Location: San Diego, California, United States
- Campus: San Diego State University
- Website: htm.sdsu.edu/degrees/htm#tribal-gaming

The Sycuan Institute on Tribal Gaming at the San Diego State University College of Professional Studies & Fine Arts is focused on research, policy and education around tribal gaming management within the broader industry of hospitality and tourism management.

== Endowment and administration ==
The institute is managed and operated by the interdisciplinary Hospitality and Tourism Management Program at SDSU and supported by an endowment from the tribal council of the Sycuan Band of the Kumeyaay Nation. The endowment was established in 2005 with a $5 million gift from the Sycuan Band of the Kumeyaay Nation, and continual payments of $474,000 on a yearly basis.

In 2019, the Institute announced a partnership with the National Indian Gaming Commission to enhance and expand data collection and research.

== Academic curriculum ==
Under the terms of the endowment, the institute has created an academic curriculum leading to a B.S. in Hospitality and Tourism Management with an emphasis in Tribal Casino Operations Management. The courses include casino operations, casino marketing and public relations, legal and regulatory issues and an introduction to tribal gaming's social, political and cultural context, along with elective courses on responsible gaming.

== Research center ==
The Research Center funds, produces and disseminates unbiased research on tribal government gaming issues.

== See also ==
- Mission Indians
- National Indian Gaming Commission
