= Donnelay =

- Commune
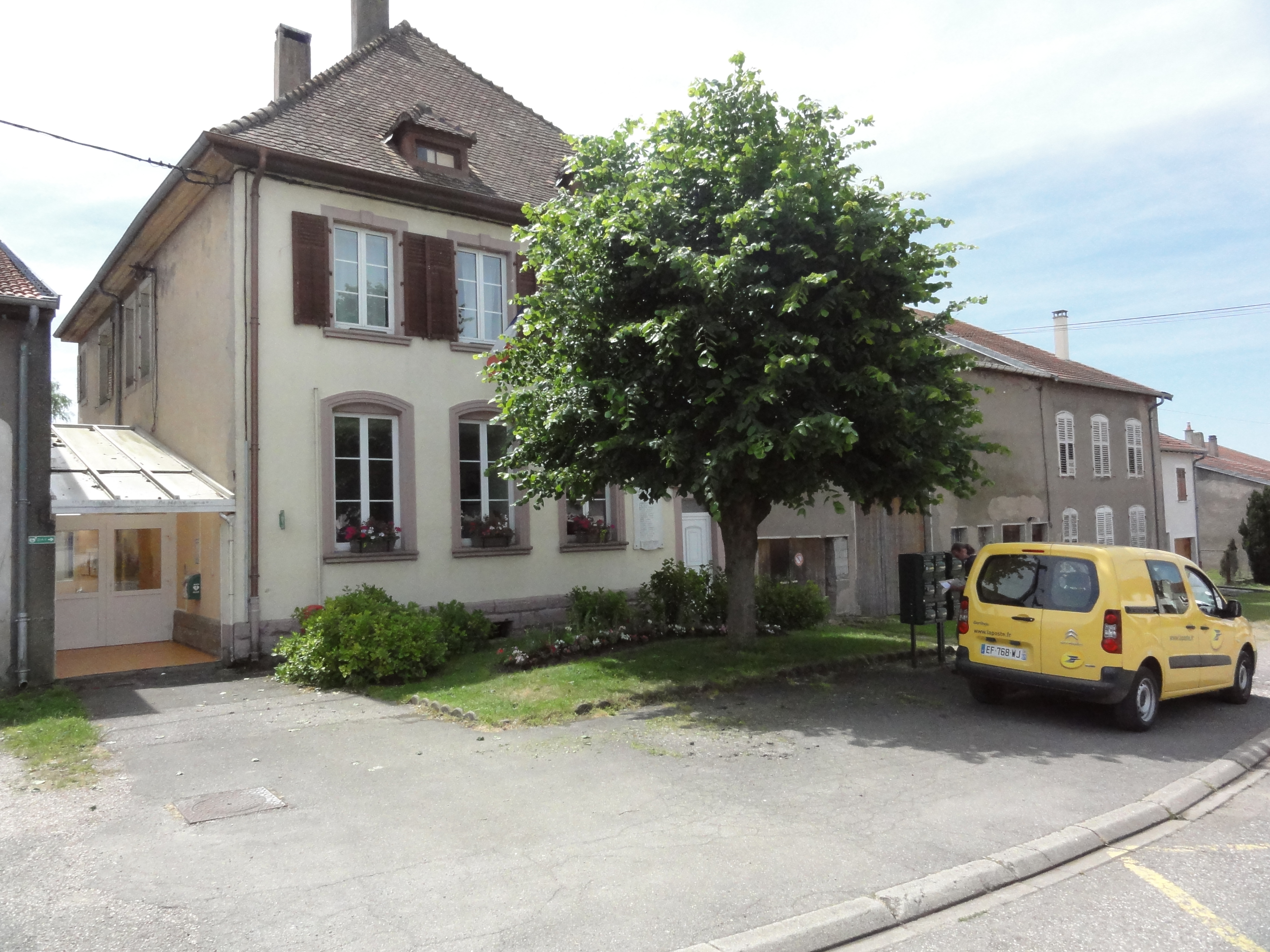
- The town hall in Donnelay

- Coat of arms
- Location of Donnelay
- Location within France Location within Grand Est
- Coordinates: 48°45′10″N 6°40′55″E
- Country: France
- Region: Grand Est
- Department: Moselle
- Arrondissement: Sarrebourg-Château-Salins
- Canton: Le Saulnois
- Intercommunality: CC du Saulnois

Government
  - Mayor (2020–2026): Christian Chamant
- Area^{1}: 13.02 km^{2} (5.03 sq mi)
- Elevation: 222 m (728 ft)
- Highest elevation: 259 m (850 ft)
- Lowest elevation: 206 m (676 ft)
- Population (2023): 193
  - Density: 14.8/km^{2} (38.4/sq mi)
- Time zone: UTC+01:00 (CET)
  - Summer (DST): UTC+02:00 (CEST)
- INSEE/Postal code: 57183 /57810
- ^{1} French Land Register data, which excludes lakes, ponds, glaciers > 1 km^{2} (0.386 sq mi or 247 acres) and river estuaries.

Donnelay (French pronunciation: [dɔnlɛ]; German: Dunningen) is a commune in the Moselle department in Grand Est in north-eastern France.

== Notable people ==
- Michel Alcan (1810–1877), French engineer, politician, and author

== See also ==
- Communes of the Moselle department
- Parc naturel régional de Lorraine
