= Akira Lane =

Japanese-Hawaiian actress

- アキラ・レイン
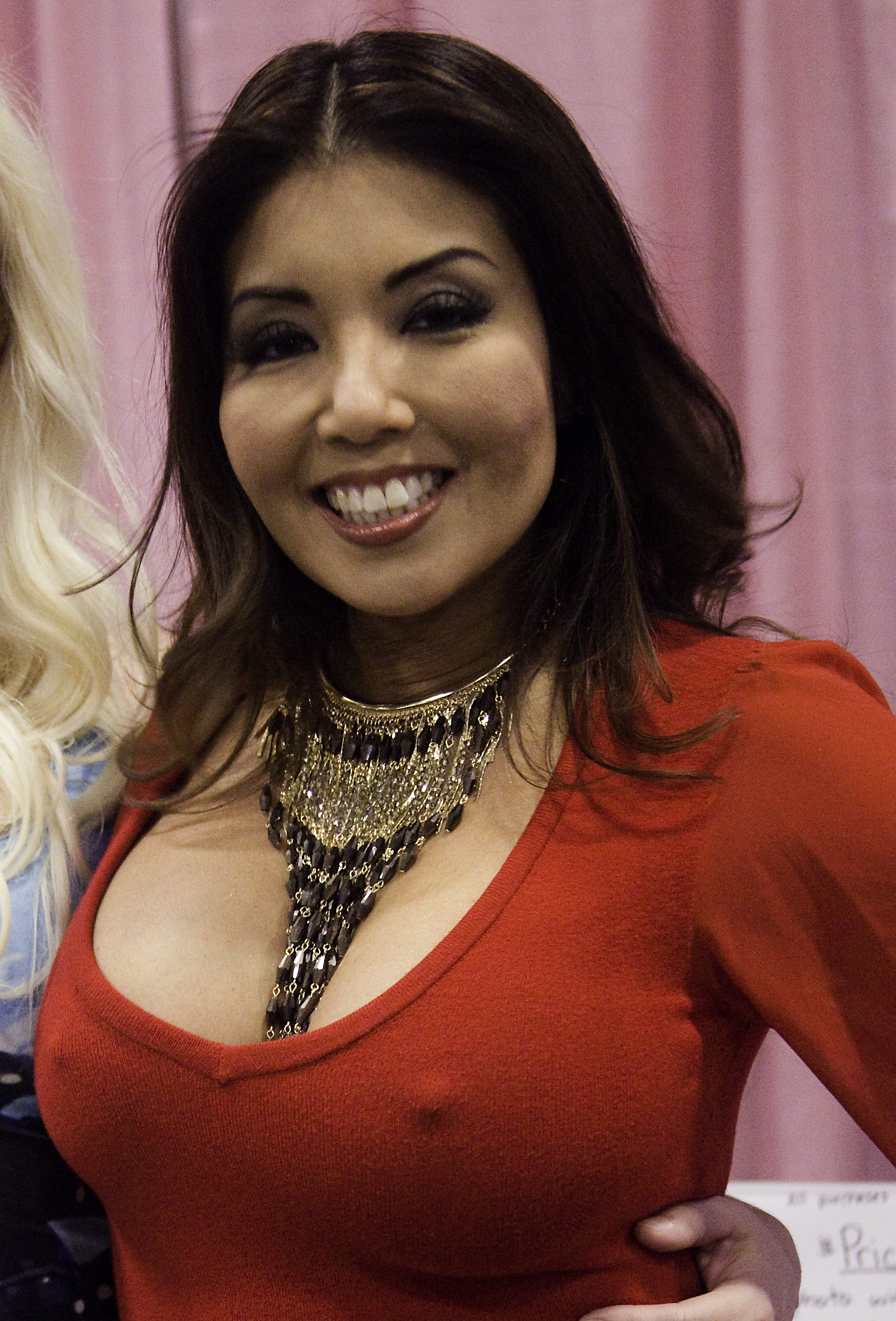
- Lane in 2015
- Born: June 9, 1981 (age 45); Naha, Okinawa Prefecture, Japan
- Occupations: Model, actress, film director
- Years active: 2001–2014
- Website: www.akiralane.com

Akira Lane (アキラ・レイン, Akira Rein; born June 9, 1981) is a Japanese-Hawaiian actress, model, and pornographic film director. Born in Japan, she has appeared in over 30 films and done many shows for Playboy TV.

== Early life and education ==
Born in Naha, Okinawa Prefecture on June 9, 1981, Lane is the only child of an American father from Hawaii and a Japanese Okinawan mother. She was taught Japanese and English, speaking both languages fluently as well as Japanglish. She transferred from a Christian school to an American school on a U.S. military base.

At age 18, she moved to Norfolk, Virginia, to attend Old Dominion University. During spring break, she traveled to San Diego County, California, where "the warm climate, the ocean breeze, and friendly people" reminded him of her hometown of Okinawa, and she fell in love with the place. She attended junior college in San Diego, working full-time for a year at a plastics distributor before transferring to San Diego State University There she graduated with a bachelor's degree in international business.

== Career ==
Lane began her career in San Diego, then moved to Orange County to pursue a career in IT. There, she worked full-time selling apps while also working as a model. While working as a software consultant for the IT company, her turning point came when she took a photo of herself drinking tequila with a friend and posted it to an online photo forum on a dare. The next day, Lane received about 20 email offers, which led to her starring in Playboy's Thrust. Although hers was a supporting role, it marked her first break in the adult film industry. Between 2001 and 2014, she appeared in 24 films, as confirmed by the Internet Adult Film Database. She has also done numerous shows for Playboy TV and Gentlemen's magazine.

Lane is known as a fetish model, having been approached by Dominic Wolfe, a rigger. However, her first job was with Phil Carson, both of whom are well-known riggers in the industry. Lane claims to have a high tolerance for discomfort, and being tied up with rope is no problem for her. She has modeled for fetishes in stockings, pantyhose, shoes (7-inch stiletto heels), and corsets. Lane has teased that her breasts are not natural.

== Personal life ==
Lane returns to Okinawa once a year. Her parents are retiring there.

She is straight and has said she likes men of all races. She told AMPED Asia in 2010 that she likes "manly men"—men who have their own place, "a job, can handle working with tools," and who have a sense of responsibility. Another important point is humor.
