= Taylor Morrison =

American building company

Taylor Morrison Home Corporation
- Type: Public
- Traded as: NYSE: TMHC (Class A)
- Industry: Home construction
- Founded: 2007; 19 years ago
- Headquarters: Scottsdale, Arizona, U.S.
- Key people: Sheryl Palmer (President and CEO)
- Revenue: ▲US$6.129 billion (2020)
- Net income: ▲US$243 million (2020)
- Number of employees: 3,000 (2025)
- Website: taylormorrison.com

Taylor Morrison Home Corporation is one of the largest home building companies in the United States. Its corporate headquarters are in Scottsdale, Arizona. The company formed when Taylor Woodrow and Morrison Homes joined forces in July 2007. Taylor Morrison operates in twelve states building entry-level to higher-end homes, both for sale and for rent. They also build resort-style communities under the Esplanade brand and build-to-rent communities, both apartments and single family homes, under the Yardly brand.

On May 31, 2026 Berkshire Hathaway announced it would be purchasing the company for $8.5 billion in cash.

== History ==
Taylor Woodrow was founded in 1921 by Frank Taylor and Jack Woodrow. They built a pair of modest semi-detached houses at 347 and 349 Central Drive, Blackpool in England. During the 1920s, Lord Taylor’s new company concentrated on providing low- cost, high quality housing in the Lancashire area. In the 1930s, Taylor Woodrow diversified into building temporary hospitals, etc., and thereby moved into general construction. In 1936 Taylor Woodrow entered the Canadian construction market through the acquisition of Monarch Development Corporation, founded in 1917, one of Canada’s oldest, largest and most diversified real estate companies. In 1953 the company purchased a controlling interest in a newly established business, Monarch Mortgage and Investments Limited, which owned land, apartment complexes, stores, and houses in the Toronto area, and in 1994, entered into the high-rise sector. Between 1945 and 2001 Taylor Woodrow's main operations were in general construction with Taylor Woodrow Homes only being a small part of the Group.

Morrison Homes was initially founded in Seattle in 1905 by C.G. Morrison and moved to northern California in 1946. The company built primarily first-time and midmarket home communities in Phoenix, Sacramento, Denver, Fort Myers, Jacksonville, Orlando, Sarasota, Tampa, Austin, and Houston. George Wimpey Plc acquired Morrison Homes in 1984 when it was based in San Francisco. George Wimpey's 2001 acquisition of Richardson Homes was later integrated under the Morrison brand.

On July 6, 2007, the United Kingdom-based parent companies of Morrison Homes Inc. and Taylor Woodrow Inc. joined. Taylor Woodrow Plc. and George Wimpey Plc. formed a new company, Taylor Wimpey Plc., becoming one of the world's largest home building companies. Morrison Homes joined with Taylor Woodrow as part of the parent company formation.

The companies continued to operate under their existing brands until 2008, when they began to operate under the new Taylor Morrison brand.

In July, 2011, Taylor Morrison became a wholly owned subsidiary of TMM Holdings Limited Partnership, which is indirectly owned by investment funds separately managed by TPG Capital, Oaktree Capital Management, as well as JH Investments.

Taylor Morrison went public on the NYSE in 2013. It sold 28.6 million shares and raised $526 million. At the time of its IPO, it was the sixth largest builder in the United States based on revenue. In 2012, it sold 4,014 homes and reported $1.44 billion in revenue.

In August 2024, Taylor Morrison made a request to the Arizona state board to have videos by CyFy Home Inspections reviewed. Their request to have CyFy Home Inspection videos of their homes be removed was denied as the videos were deemed to be accurate and truthful.

== Bibliography ==
- Jenkins, Alan (1971). On Site 1921-71. Heinemann:London. pp. 226p. ISBN 0-434-90890-8.
- Jenkins, Alan (1980). Built on Teamwork - Sequel to On Site. Heinemann:London. pp. 245p. ISBN 0-434-37289-7.
