= Urs Wild =

Swiss chemist (1936–2022)

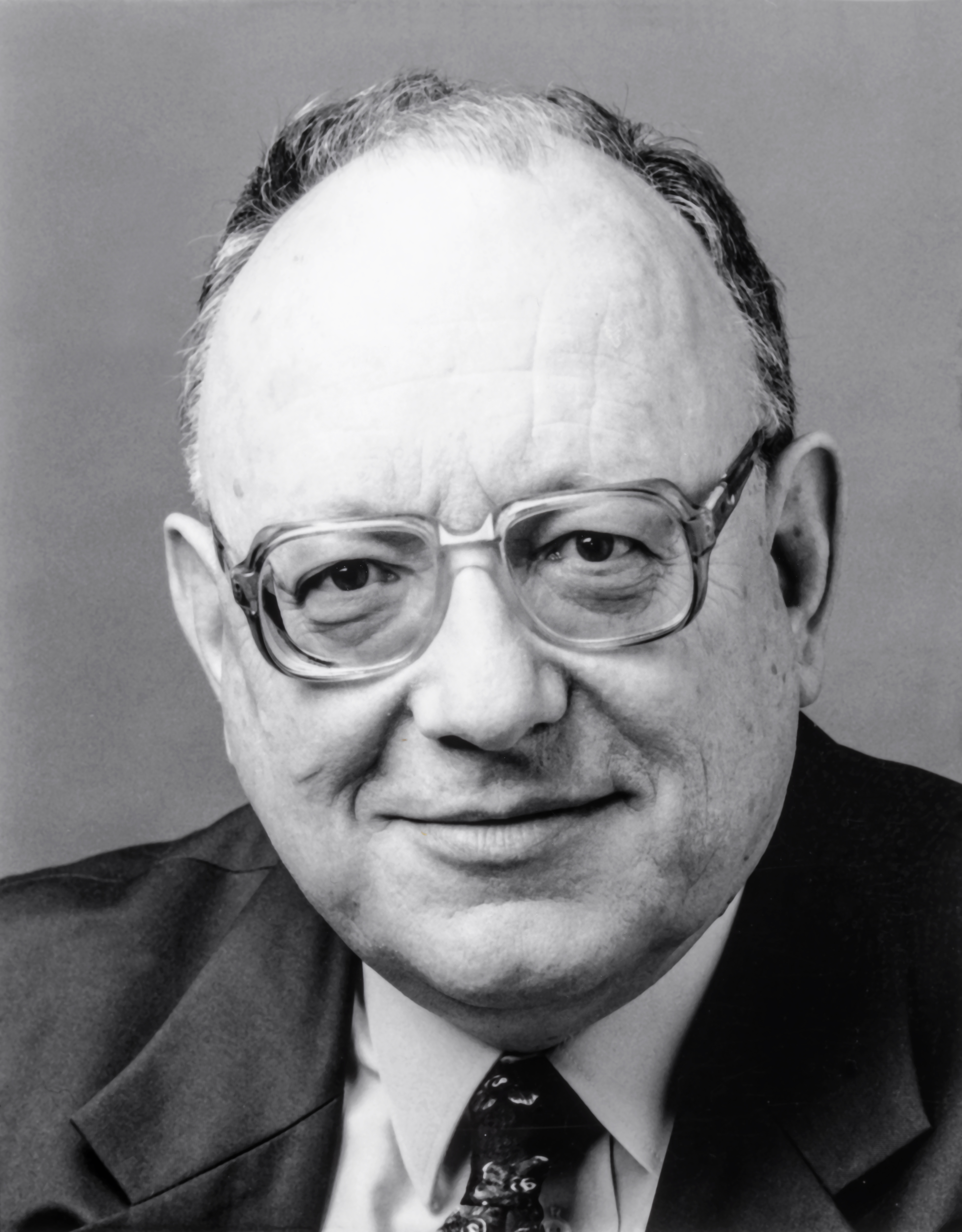
- Wild in 1997
- Born: 17 April 1936; Winterthur, Switzerland
- Died: 22 November 2022 (aged 86)
- Education: ETH Zurich (PhD)
- Scientific career
- Fields: Chemistry
- Thesis: Aufbau einer Blitzlichtapparatur mit Zündfunkenstrecke und ihre Anwendung zum Studium der Triplett-Triplett Annihilation von Anthracen in Glycerin (1965)
- Doctoral advisor: Hans H. Günthard

Urs Paul Rolf Wild (17 April 1936 – 22 November 2022) was a Swiss chemist. He became known for his pioneering works in single molecule detection.

== Biography ==
Wild studied chemistry at ETH Zurich. He received his Master Diploma in physics at the University of Kansas, Lawrence, Kansas, US, in 1962. He completed his PhD under Professor Günthard at the Laboratory of Physical Chemistry, ETH Zurich in 1965, the subject of his PhD thesis was "Aufbau einer Blitzlichtapparatur mit Zündfunkenstrecke und ihre Anwendung zum Studium der Triplett-Triplett Annihilation von Anthracen in Glycerin".

In 1972 Wild was appointed assistant professor at the Laboratory of Physical Chemistry, ETH Zurich. He was promoted to associate professor in 1977 and to full professor in 1984. He retired in October 2001.

From 2000 Wild was a member of Heidelberg Academy of Sciences and Humanities.

He worked with, among others, the Polish physical chemist Jerzy Sepioł.

William E. Moerner took an eight-month sabbatical in 1993–1994 to become a visiting guest professor in the lab of Wild at ETH Zurich, Switzerland.

=== Publications and Patents ===
- Urs P. Wild, Dietrich Döpp and Heinz Dürr, Triplet States II in Topics in Current Chemistry Volume 55, Springer, Berlin 1975, ISBN 3-540-07197-0.
- Thomas Basché, William E. Moerner, Michel Orrit, Urs P. Wild, Single‐Molecule Optical Detection, Imaging and Spectroscopy, Wiley, 1996, ISBN 978-3-527-29316-2, 978-3-527-61471-4. doi:10.1002/9783527614714.
- co-author of more than 300 papers.
