= Chukuka S. Enwemeka =

Nigerian-American scholar

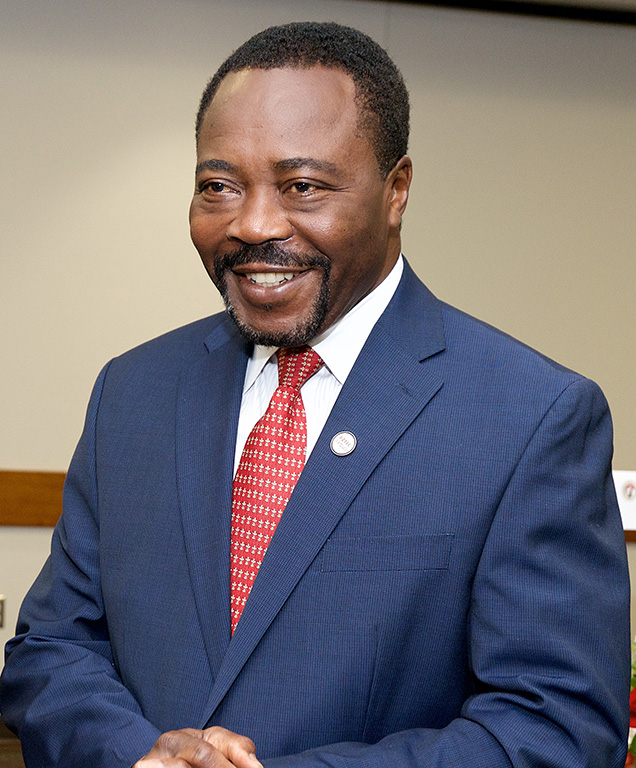
- Enwemeka in 2017
- Born: Chukuka Samuel Enwemeka; March 7, 1953 (age 73); Agbor, Delta State, Nigeria
- Education: University of Ibadan (BS); University of Southern California (MS); New York University (PhD)
- Occupations: Physical Therapist, Educator, University Administrator, Researcher
- Years active: 1978 – Present
- Known for: Physical Therapy, Photobiology, Photomodulation, Phototherapy, Photochemistry, Tissue engineering, Allied Health, Public Health
- Spouse: Roselyn Enwemeka (m. 2007)

Chukuka Samuel Enwemeka (born March 7, 1953) is an academic, Emeritus Professor, San Diego State University, Emeritus Distinguished Professor, University of Wisconsin—Milwaukee. He served as the president and vice chancellor of James Hope University, Lagos, Nigeria.

== Early life and education ==
Enwemeka was born on March 7, 1953, at Agbor, formerly in Western Region, Nigeria, currently Delta State, Nigeria. He obtained his Bachelor of Science degree from the University of Ibadan, his Master of Science degree from the University of Southern California, Los Angeles, and his Ph.D. from New York University, New York. All his academic degrees are in the field of Physical Therapy.

== Academic career ==
He began his academic career as a Graduate Assistant at the University of Port Harcourt, Port Harcourt, Rivers State, Nigeria. Following his Ph.D., he served as a Research Fellow at Rusk Institute of Rehabilitation Medicine, New York University Medical Center, New York, before joining the University of Texas Health Science Center at San Antonio as Assistant Professor of Physical Therapy, Cellular and Structural Biology and Physiology in 1986. In 1989 he was appointed Associate Professor of Orthopedics and Rehabilitation at the University of Miami School of Medicine, Miami, Florida, and in 1993 he became Professor and Chairperson of Physical Therapy and Rehabilitation Science at the University of Kansas Medical Center, Kansas City, Kansas. Enwemeka was appointed Professor and Dean, College of Health Professions, New York Institute of Technology in March 2003. His subsequent executive academic leadership positions include: Dean College of Health Sciences, University of Wisconsin—Milwaukee (July 2009 – June 2014), and Provost and Senior Vice President of San Diego State University, San Diego, California from June 2014 to May 2018.

In 2018, Enwemeka unexpectedly resigned as provost and senior vice president of San Diego State University for unknown reasons. According to The San Diego Union-Tribune, faculty had expressed concerns about an email he wrote to a professor who had requested for an early review of Enwemeka. Even though the university senate declined the early review, the president proceeded with it against the wish of the senate. In the email Enwemeka stated the professor sought to harm him and "So that instead of blessings, you are showered with unending curse and harmed, hurt and visited by evil a million fold in everything you do throughout the rest of your life," further stating that "Please note that in stating the foregoing, I am not necessarily cursing or wishing you evil. I am simply invoking the natural Law of Karma; the Law of Retributive Justice.” Enwemeka's performance review was overall positive.

He served as editor, or co-editor-in-chief of several international scientific and professional journals and is emeritus editor-in-chief of Laser Therapy Journal and emeritus co-editor-in-chief of Photomedicine and Laser Surgery, currently known as Photobiomodulation, Photomedicine, and Laser Surgery.

== Research and scholarly publications ==
Enwemeka is an author of peer-reviewed publications, books and monographs. According to ResearchGate, Enwemeka's scholarly work has been cited over 6,197 times; his Research index Score is 3,273, and H-index of 40. Google Scholar reported that Enwemeka's works have been cited 8,100 times, h-index of 43, he has an i10-index of 75.

== Board and trustee appointments ==
Enwemeka served as a Non-Executive Director of Zenith Bank from July 2010 to June 2022. He was a member and eventually chairperson of the United States National Institutes of Health's National Advisory Board on Medical Rehabilitation Research. Enwemeka served as a Trustee of California Western School of Law, San Diego, California and is a Trustee of James Hope College, Agbor, Delta State, Nigeria, and James Hope University, Lagos, Nigeria.
