= S. Donley Ritchey =

S. Donley Ritchey is managing partner of Alpine Partners, a family investment general partnership in Danville, California, and has served in this capacity since 1981. Ritchey was chairman of the Board of Lucky Stores, Inc. from 1981 until his retirement in 1986 as well as chief executive officer from 1980 to 1985. Ritchey has been a director of AT&T Inc. since April 1997. He served as a director of Pacific Telesis Group from 1984 until the company was acquired by AT&T Inc. in 1997 until his retirement in 2007. Ritchey is a director of the McClatchy Company.
