= Ora et labora =

Latin phrase and Benedictine motto and invocation

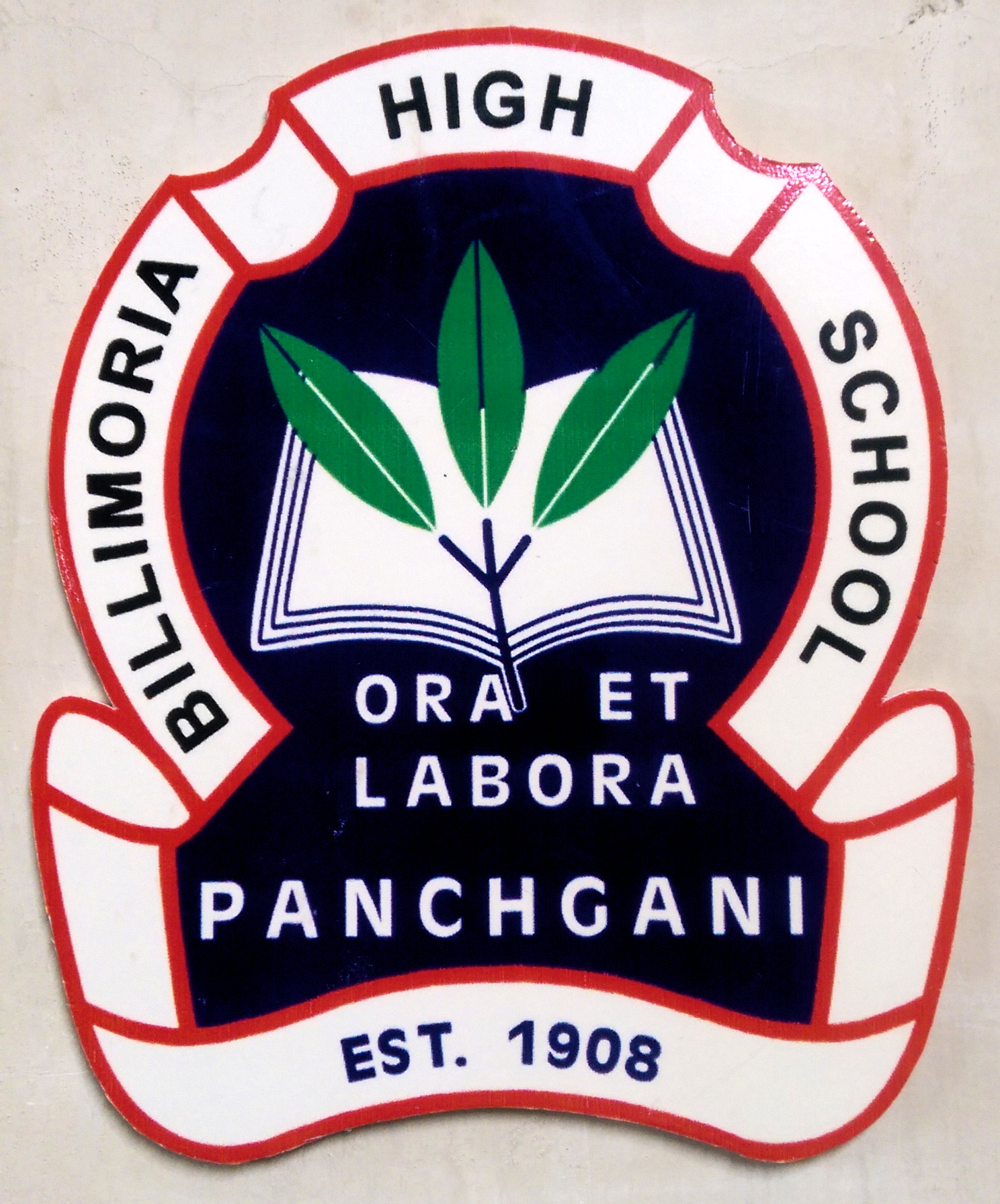
The motto ORA ET LABORA on the emblem of Billimoria High School in Panchgani, India

The phrases "pray and work" (or "pray and labor"; Latin: ora et labora) and to work is to pray (laborare est orare) refer to the monastic practice of working and praying, generally associated with its use in the Rule of Saint Benedict.

== History ==
Ora et labora is the traditional slogan of the Benedictines. This derives from Benedict's desire for his monks to have balanced lives, dominated by neither work nor prayer. St. Benedict's Rule prescribes periods of work for the monks for "Idleness is the enemy of the soul" (RB 48.1).

Some orders applied the concept directly to farm work and became an element in the movement towards land reclamation from rot and agricultural development in Western Europe. Other orders, such as the Humiliati, applied the concept to the production of woolen cloth using wheels in the period prior to the Industrial Revolution.

== Modern examples ==
The phrase expresses the need to balance prayer and work in monastic settings and has been used in many religious communities from the Middle Ages onwards.

In addition to praying the Liturgy of the Hours, the Benedictine monks of St. Andrew Abbey teach at Benedictine High School and staff a retreat house. Ora et Labora is a publication of Benedictine High School and St. Andrew Abbey.

While the monastic life of the monks of Our Lady of Dallas Cistercian Abbey is centered upon the liturgy, their primary occupation is teaching. They find this "a successful symbiosis of Cistercian life and apostolic mission".

The Anglican sisters of the Community of St. Mary in Greenwich, New York pray the Divine Office five times each day and raise Cashmere goats for wool.

=== Uses ===
An alternative rendering of the phrase, laborare est orare (literally "To work is to pray"), features prominently in Thomas Carlyle's Past and Present (1843): "Admirable was that of the old Monks, Laborare est Orare, Work is Worship."

Edward King, Bishop of Lincoln and graduate of Oxford University, referred to the motto "laborare est orare" as one he adopted to shape his daily life. In 2010 Rowan Williams Archbishop of Canterbury scheduled an episcopal visit to Lincoln Cathedral on the 100th anniversary of Bishop King's death.

Professor Murphy has published an 18-page 21st century analysis of nuances comparing "laborare est orare" versus "ora et labora."

In 1818, Dalhousie University was established in Nova Scotia, adopting the motto of Ora et Labora in 1870. This is also the motto of Clan Ramsay, of which the Earl of Dalhousie is the leader.

In 1874, Wesley College, Colombo, a high school in Sri Lanka, was founded by Methodist missionaries. It has been using "Ora Et Labora" as the motto since its inception.

Ora et labora is the motto of Melbourne Grammar School in Australia and the current motto of St. Joseph's Institution, an independent school in Singapore.

It is also carved into the entry of The King's School Chapel, Parramatta, Australia.

It is also the motto of Infant Jesus Anglo Indian High School (IJHS), Tangasseri, Kollam, Kerala, India, the motto of the Chapel of St Olav in Sandefjord in Norway, the motto of St Joseph's Institution in Singapore and the motto of the St. Michael's Secondary School in Penampang, Sabah, Malaysia.

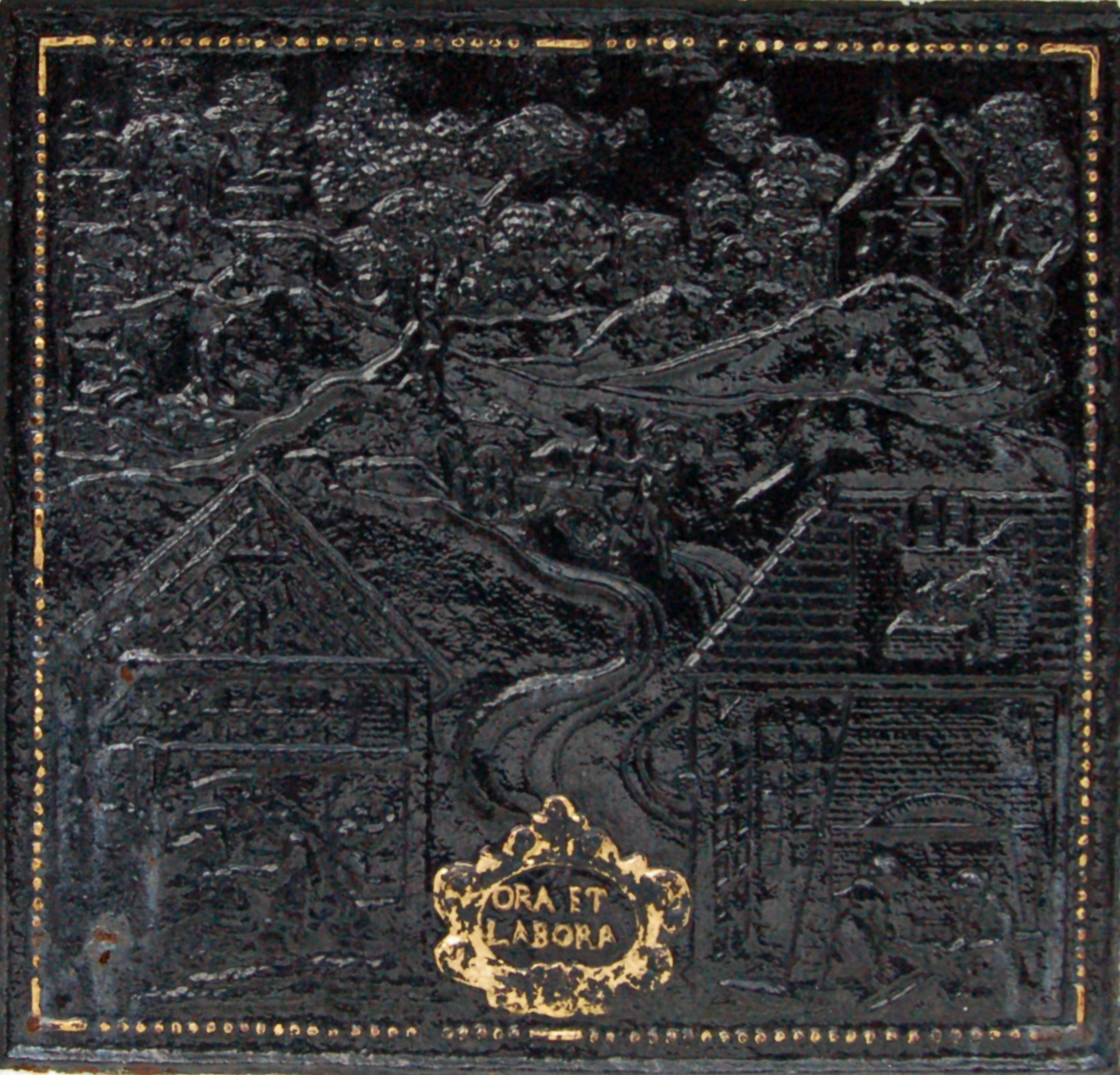
Relief with the motto ORA ET LABORA (highlighted in gold)

== See also ==
- Critique of work
- Lectio Divina
- Prayer, meditation and contemplation in Christianity
- Work ethic
- Opus Dei

== Bibliography ==
- Ora et labora: prayer and action as cooperation with God by Robert Field, University of the South, 1993
