= Fly Williams =

American basketball player

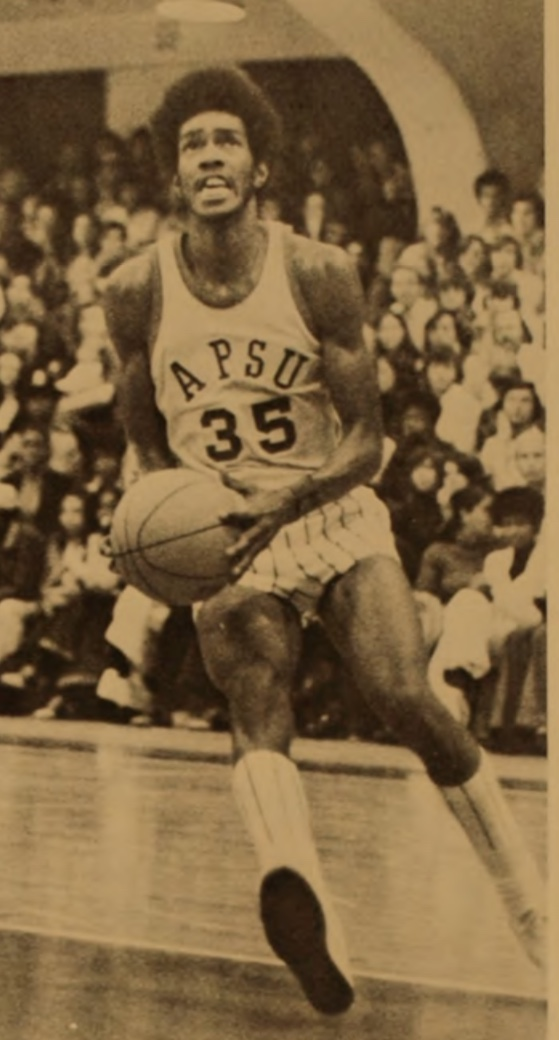
- Williams with the Austin Peay Governors during the 1973–74 season

Personal information
- Born: February 18, 1953 (age 73) Brooklyn, New York, U.S.
- Listed height: 6 ft 5 in (1.96 m)
- Listed weight: 200 lb (91 kg)

Career information
- High school: James Madison (Brooklyn, New York); Glen Springs Academy (Watkins Glen, New York)
- College: Austin Peay (1972–1974)
- NBA draft: 1976: 9th round, 152nd overall pick
- Drafted by: Philadelphia 76ers
- Playing career: 1974–1980
- Position: Shooting guard
- Number: 35

Career history
- 1974–1975: Spirits of St. Louis
- 1975–1976: Allentown Jets
- 1976–1977: Lancaster Red Roses
- 1977–1979: Jersey Shore Bullets
- 1979–1980: Rochester Zeniths

Career highlights
- Third-team All-American – UPI (1974); OVC Player of the Year (1974); 2× First-team All-OVC (1973, 1974); No. 35 retired by Austin Peay Governors
- Stats at Basketball Reference

James "Fly" Williams (born February 18, 1953) is an American former professional basketball player. He played in the American Basketball Association (ABA) for the Spirits of St. Louis and for multiple teams in the Continental Basketball Association (CBA). A street basketball player from New York, he is known for scoring 100 points in an IS8 League game in 1978.

== Early life ==
Born in Brownsville, Brooklyn, New York, Williams attended Madison High School. Initially, he was interested in being a baseball pitcher but was advised that he had become too tall to remain competitive in that sport.

Williams' popularity quickly grew due to his frequent participation in street basketball games. He played with skilled street players in New York, including World B. Free and Earl "the Goat" Manigault. When the neighborhood games eventually ended, Williams would go out in search of more opportunities to play basketball.

Williams played basketball for Madison High in the early 1970s. By his freshman year, he stood 6 feet 5 inches (1.96 m) tall, a skilled player with knowledge of backboard action and a knack for working crowds. However, due to poor attendance at Madison, Williams transferred and completed high school at Glen Springs Academy, a preparatory school in Watkins Glen, New York. The book Heaven Is a Playground discusses, among other things, the education of Fly Williams. According to sportswriter Terry Pluto, Williams assumed the nickname as an homage to singer Curtis "Super Fly" Mayfield. Williams was known for his play at Rucker Park and The Hole in Brownsville.

== College ==
After Williams completed high school, he was recruited by assistant basketball coach, Leonard Hamilton, to attend Austin Peay State University in Clarksville, Tennessee.

Williams arrived on campus in 1972. A substantial reception greeted him upon arrival, which included a sky-writing demonstration spelling out his name. His scoring record as a freshman was impressive. Williams averaged 29.4 points per game in 1973, fifth best in the nation. When the Austin Peay Governors won a bid to the National Collegiate Athletic Association (NCAA) tournament, Williams scored 26 points in a first-round win over Jacksonville University. In the second round of the tournament, Williams again scored 26, but the Governors lost in overtime to the University of Kentucky, coached by Joe B. Hall.

Williams scored 51 points twice as a freshman. In his sophomore season, Williams averaged 27.5 points per game, the third-highest average in the NCAA. Once again, the Governors basketball team won a bid for the NCAA tournament. Williams again scored 26 points, but Austin Peay lost to Notre Dame, 108–66, in the first round.

During his time at Austin Peay, Williams scored 1,541 points with a 28.5 point per game average. He left college due to hardship and pursued a professional career. In 1975, Austin Peay was able to follow up Williams' two years of scoring numbers by opening the Dunn Center, a larger gymnasium, which accommodated the increased attendance at basketball games.

== Professional career ==
The Denver Nuggets drafted Williams in the first round (second overall) of the 1974 ABA Draft. Following the draft, there were several offers to buy Williams' player contract. Eventually, his contract was sold to the Spirits of St. Louis.

The 1974–75 season was a disappointment to Williams and his team. He only managed to score 9.4 points per game for the Spirits. Williams’ scoring was erratic and he became known more for his showmanship than his scoring proficiency. His quirks were detailed in small part in Terry Pluto's ABA book Loose Balls, which included one getting into a fight at the pregame layup drill. He did not play during the following year (1975–76), after which the Spirits of St. Louis were one of two teams, along with the Kentucky Colonels, to fold as a result of the ABA-NBA merger. Williams ended up without a team despite some interest in retaining him in the league, but eventually the Philadelphia 76ers selected Williams in the ninth round (152nd overall) of the 1976 NBA draft, despite not signing him to a player contract.

Williams then played in the Continental Basketball Association and the Eastern League, but he failed to attract attention by NBA scouts. He later played for a team in Israel, eventually admitting that his temperament probably predicated his lack of serious offers after the leagues merged.

== Retirement ==
Williams's career ended when he was shot by an off-duty police officer. The shotgun wound left him with decreased lung capacity and scars on his back. In retirement, Williams spent time working with disadvantaged youth and continued to play "streetball"; Williams is listed as the number two athlete on the "50 Greatest Streetballers of All Time" by the Street Basketball Association (SBA).

While playing at Austin Peay, Williams' nickname inspired a humorous fan chant: "The Fly is open, let's go Peay!" Fans still chant "Let's Go Peay" at all basketball games. Williams' number 35 jersey was retired by Austin Peay State University on February 5, 2009.

A book on the life of Williams was written by Knoxville, Tennessee-based author Dave Link. Called The Fly 35 (citing his jersey number at Austin Peay), it was published to coincide with the jersey retirement ceremony.

In May 2017, Williams was arrested in Brooklyn, NY, and charged with being the alleged leader of a large heroin distribution ring. He pled guilty and was released on parole in January 2023.

== See also ==
- List of basketball players who have scored 100 points in a single game

== Notes ==
- "Fly on the Rebound: An update on a basketball legend". Austin Peay State University Alumni Magazine. Archived from the original on June 6, 2007.
- "Fly Williams Shot". The New York Times. February 21, 1987.
- Pluto, Terry, Loose Balls: The Short, Wild Life of the American Basketball Association, Simon & Schuster, 1991, ISBN 978-0-671-74921-7
