= University of South Carolina steroid scandal =

1988 steroid use scandal

In October 1988, Sports Illustrated published a lengthy article on alleged steroid abuse in the football program at the University of South Carolina. The article, titled "The Nightmare of Steroids" and written by University of South Carolina football player Tommy Chaikin in collaboration with Sports Illustrated's Rick Telander, alleged the widespread use of steroids in the football program at the school. Following the article, a federal grand jury indicted four University of South Carolina football coaches in connection with steroid distribution to players. Three of the coaches pleaded guilty in plea-bargain arrangements and the fourth was acquitted. The episode was listed among "some of college football's biggest scandals" by sports reporter Tom Weir of USA Today.

== "The Nightmare of Steroids" ==
"The Nightmare of Steroids" was featured in the October 24, 1988 issue of Sports Illustrated. The article begins with Tommy Chaikin, a defensive lineman on the University of South Carolina football team, vividly narrating his steroid-induced experiences the day before the annual South Carolina-Clemson football game in 1987. In his own words, Chaikin describes himself sitting in his dorm room on the USC campus with a loaded handgun pressed to his chin. The story continues in stream of consciousness fashion to describe how he had arrived at the brink of suicide, and includes other significant factors in his three-year odyssey with steroids including peer pressure, the physical and mental effects of the drugs on himself, the coaches he alleged were involved, and his eventual rescue by his father. In the article, Chaikin alleges that half the USC football team was using steroids, however this claim was never substantiated.

== Reaction ==
Shortly after the article ran in Sports Illustrated, an investigation by South Carolina's Fifth Circuit Solicitor James Anders was announced. Based on the results of this preliminary investigation, a joint state and federal probe was announced on November 11, 1988.

Joe Morrison, the Gamecocks' head coach since 1983, died on February 5, 1989.

On April 19, 1989 a federal grand jury indicted USC defensive coordinator Tom Gadd, defensive line coach Jim Washburn, tight ends coach Tom Kurucz, and strength coach Keith Kephart in connection with steroid distribution to players. A fifth person, John Landon Carter of Bethesda, Maryland, was also charged with dispensing anabolic steroids to four former Gamecock players: Tommy Chaikin, David Poinsett, Heyward Myers and George Hyder. The indictments charged that illegal acts occurred from 1984 through December 1987. Gadd, Washburn, and Kurucz were accused of conspiring to "provide money to certain players and athletic personnel of the university for the purchasing of steroids for use by athletic personnel." The indictments stated that the three monitored training programs to enhance steroid use and "would arrange to obtain sources for the purchase of unprescribed, misbranded steroids which were thereafter utilized by football players." Kephart was charged with conspiring with other members of the USC athletic community to obtain steroids illegally across state lines, and the indictments charged that he and unidentified others "would administer the steroids to each other to improve athletic performance and to enhance physical appearance." The United States Attorney, Vinton D. Lide, said he would not charge players or graduate assistants with crimes because he considered them to be victims.

== Outcome ==
Following the indictments, Washburn, Kurucz, Kephart, and Carter entered into plea-bargain agreements with the federal prosecutor. They were awaiting sentencing when Gadd, who elected to fight the charges, was acquitted by a United States District Court jury on June 21, 1989. On August 10, 1989, the remaining four were sentenced. United States District Judge G. Ross Anderson sentenced John Carter to serve three months at a community security facility. Among the coaches, Tom Kurucz received the harshest sentence: six months in a halfway house and three years probation. Jim Washburn and Keith Kephart were sentenced to three months in a halfway house and given three-year probationary terms. The University of South Carolina received no sanctions from the NCAA as a result of these events.

== See also ==
- Doping in the United States
- Doping in sport
