= John Goode (American football) =

No. 84, 87
- Position: Tight End

Personal information
- Born: November 5, 1962; Cleveland Heights, Ohio, U.S.
- Listed height: 6 ft 2 in (1.88 m)
- Listed weight: 233 lb (106 kg)

Career information
- High school: Benedictine (Cleveland, Ohio)
- College: Youngstown State (1980–1983)
- NFL draft: 1984: 5th round, 136th overall pick

Career history
- St. Louis Cardinals (1984–1985); Philadelphia Eagles (1985–1986); Detroit Lions (1986)*; New York Jets (1987)*; Cincinnati Bengals (1988)*
- * Offseason or practice squad member only

Awards and highlights
- Third-team I-AA All-American (1983); First-team All-Ohio Valley Conference (1983)

Career NFL statistics
- Games played: 30
- Games started: 1
- Receptions: 3
- Receiving yards: 23
- Receiving average: 7.7
- Stats at Pro Football Reference

John Timothy Goode (born November 5, 1962) is an American former professional football player who was a tight end for the St. Louis Cardinals, Philadelphia Eagles, Detroit Lions, New York Jets and the Cincinnati Bengals of the National Football League (NFL). He played college football for the Youngstown State Penguins.

== Early life ==
Goode was born on November 5, 1962, in Cleveland Heights, Ohio. He attended Benedictine in Cleveland and earned Class AA all-state honors his senior year. Goode signed a national letter of intent to play college football at Youngstown State University.

== College career ==
Goode played college football for the Youngstown State Penguins from 1980 to 1983. In his first season, he began as a wide receiver/ kick and punt return specialist, catching 13 passes for 174 yards and one touchdown in seven contests. The following year, Goode saw increased usage in the offense recording 22 receptions for 394 yards and three touchdowns as well as a 60-yard punt return for a touchdown.

In his junior season, he suffered an injury, causing him to miss four games but still managed to record 14 catches for 205 yards and one touchdown. Goode's final year was his best, leading the team in receptions (46) for 974 yards and 11 touchdowns in ten games. He garnered first-team All-Ohio Valley Conference and third-team All-America honors by the AP.

== Professional career ==
=== Oklahoma Outlaws ===
Goode was selected by the Oklahoma Outlaws in the fifth round, 86th overall, of the 1984 USFL draft, however, he would not sign with the team, and instead decided to wait for the NFL draft.

=== St. Louis Cardinals ===
Goode was selected by the St. Louis Cardinals in the fifth round, 136th overall, of the 1984 NFL draft. He officially signed with the team on July 19, 1984, "to a series of one-year contracts". Goode played in all 16 games and started in one, where he recorded three receptions for 23 yards. He was released by the team on September 2, 1985.

=== Philadelphia Eagles ===
On September 13, 1985, Goode signed with the Philadelphia Eagles. He played in 14 games, mostly appearing on special teams and made 12 tackles. On July 29, Goode was released by the team.

=== Detroit Lions ===
On August 1, 1986, Goode was signed by the Detroit Lions. He was released by the team on August 18.

=== New York Jets ===
On May 15, 1987, Goode was signed by the New York Jets. He was waived by the team on August 18.

=== Cincinnati Bengals ===
On April 8, 1988, Good was signed by the Cincinnati Bengals. He was released from the team on August 29.

== Personal life ==
Goode is the father of Super Bowl LII champion, Najee Goode, who played nine years in the NFL at linebacker. After retiring from football, he later worked at Ford in the production department.
