= Nigel Miguel =

Belizean-American actor and basketball player (born 1963)

- Born: Nigel Patrick Miguel; April 8, 1963 (age 63); Belize
- Citizenship: Belize; United States
- Education: UCLA
- Occupations: Actor; film producer; technical advisor; film commissioner
- Basketball career

Personal information
- Listed height: 6 ft 6 in (1.98 m)

Career information
- High school: Notre Dame (Sherman Oaks, California)
- College: UCLA (1981–1985)
- NBA draft: 1985: 3rd round, 62nd overall pick
- Drafted by: New Jersey Nets
- Playing career: 1985–1987
- Position: Point guard

Career history
- 1985–1986: La Crosse Catbirds

Career highlights
- CBA All-Rookie team (1986); First-team All-Pac-10 (1985); Pac-10 Defensive Player of the Year (1985); Third-team Parade All-American (1981); McDonald's All-American (1981)
- Stats at Basketball Reference

Nigel Patrick Miguel (born April 8, 1963) is a Belizean-American actor, film producer, and technical advisor who is the film commissioner for Belize. He is also a former professional basketball player. A native of Belize, he immigrated to the United States when he was six, and holds dual citizenship with both countries.

Miguel played college basketball for the UCLA Bruins, earning all-conference honors in the Pacific-10 (currently known as the Pac-12). He played one season professionally in the Continental Basketball Association (CBA). Using his athletic skills and basketball talents, he later landed acting and advisor roles in commercials, movies, and television. In 1994, Miguel was appointed by Belize as goodwill ambassador to the United States, and the government named him its film commissioner in 2008. Miguel has also owned production company II Jam Casting & Production since 1995.

== Early life ==
Miguel was born in British Honduras, now known as Belize, and grew up in Belize City. His formative years were spent in Southern California, after his family left Belize when he was six. They settled in Los Angeles, and moved to Pacoima when he was 13. He played basketball at Notre Dame High School in Sherman Oaks, California. As a 6-foot-6-inch (1.98 m) senior forward in 1981, he led his team to a 19–5 overall record and the Del Rey League championship. Miguel averaged 23.1 points and 10.0 rebounds and was named to the California Interscholastic Federation (CIF) 4A first-team. He also earned McDonald's All-American honors.

== Basketball career ==
=== College career ===
Miguel decided to attend college at the University of California, Los Angeles (UCLA) over the University of Southern California (USC), their crosstown rival. He was recruited to UCLA by coach Larry Brown; however, Brown left after the 1980–81 season, and Miguel played under coach Larry Farmer for his first three seasons. He became the first Belizean to play in Division I sports. His play was disappointing; in his junior year in 1983–84, he averaged only 4 points a game with a field goal percentage of just 39.8%.

Walt Hazzard became the UCLA coach in Miguel's senior year. After playing at both forward and guard under Farmer, he was moved to point guard by Hazzard. In his final season, Miguel became a defensive stopper, and defended the opponents' best scorer. His scoring also improved to an average of 12 points while shooting 48.6%. Miguel earned All-Pac-10 honors and was also named Pac-10 Defensive Player of the Year while helping lead the Bruins to the 1985 National Invitation Tournament championship. He graduated from UCLA in 1985 with a degree in political science.

=== Professional career ===
Miguel tried out for the New Jersey Nets (now known as the Brooklyn Nets) of the National Basketball Association (NBA) after they selected him in the third round of the 1985 NBA draft with the 62nd overall pick. After the guard was cut by the Nets in training camp, he joined the La Crosse Catbirds, a new team in the CBA. He played all 48 games in the regular season while shooting 48.2% and averaging 17.5 points, and earned All-CBA rookie team honors as a point guard. He finished second on the team behind former NBA player Paul Thompson in scoring, and was also runner-up behind former NBA player Michael Adams for CBA Rookie of the Year. Miguel improved in the playoffs, when he shot 50.6% and averaged 21.3 points, 4.3 rebounds, 3.9 assists and 1.5 steals. La Crosse advanced to the championship round against the Tampa Bay Thrillers, but he missed the first two games with a pulled hamstring and played the remainder of the series hurt; the Catbirds lost to the Thrillers 4–1.

After receiving invitations to training camp from multiple NBA teams in 1986–87, Miguel settled on the Nets' two-year contract offer over the Los Angeles Lakers' one-year deal. The timing seemed ideal for Miguel, as the Nets were without any of their guards from the prior season. (Note: Nets guards from 1985–86 were Otis Birdsong (unsigned), Micheal Ray Richardson (drug suspension), Kelvin Ransey (unsigned), Darwin Cook (traded), and Ray Williams (unsigned).) However, Miguel broke a bone in his left heel during the final week of camp, and he was released by New Jersey after being paid the one guaranteed year from his contract. He returned to the Nets in 1987–88, but he was slower after his injury, and again was cut. Miguel lost the desire to continue playing, and his basketball career ended.

== Entertainment career ==
While out of basketball with his foot injury, Miguel secured an agent to pursue an acting career. Using his athletic skills and basketball talents, he landed acting roles. In late 1987, Miguel had a small role in a commercial for Reebok, and others followed, including spots for Converse, Nike and Pepsi. In 1991, he won the role of Dwight the Flight in the movie White Men Can't Jump. He has appeared in numerous other Hollywood and television movies, as well as television series. Miguel also spent seven years as the body double for Michael Jordan. Additionally, he has served as a basketball technical advisor on movies including Space Jam, Elizabethtown, and Rebound: The Legend of Earl "The Goat" Manigault, as well as an adviser for Nike commercials.

Since 1995, Miguel has owned II Jam Casting & Production, a production company which places athletes and musicians in commercial and films. The company has worked with individuals such as athletes Jordan, LeBron James, and Shaquille O'Neal as well as musician Snoop Dogg and director Philip Atwell.

== Ambassador for Belize ==
The Belize government appointed Miguel as its first goodwill ambassador to the United States in 1994. He was tasked with promoting jobs for the youth of Belize, and encouraging U.S. companies to establish branch offices and franchises in Belize. In 2008, the government elevated Miguel to Film Commissioner for the Government of Belize to promote and enhance the country's film industry locally and abroad. The position had been vacant since the death of Emory King.

== Filmography ==
=== Film ===
Title	Year	Credit(s)	Ref.
Colors	1988	Actor	
Heaven Is a Playground	1991	Actor	
White Men Can't Jump	1992	Actor	
The Air Up There	1993	Actor	
Blue Chips	1994	Actor	
Forget Paris	1995	Actor	
Space Jam	1996	Technical advisor	
American History X	1998	Actor	
Elizabethtown	2005	Actor	
Elizabethtown	2005	Technical advisor	

=== Television ===
Title	Year	Credit(s)	Ref.
21 Jump Street	1990	Actor	
Equal Justice	1991	Actor	
Hangin' with Mr. Cooper	1993	Actor	
Martin	1993	Actor	
Rebound: The Legend of Earl "The Goat" Manigault	1997	Technical advisor	

== See also ==
- 1981 McDonald's All-American Boys Game
