= Joe Zelenka =

American football player (born 1976)

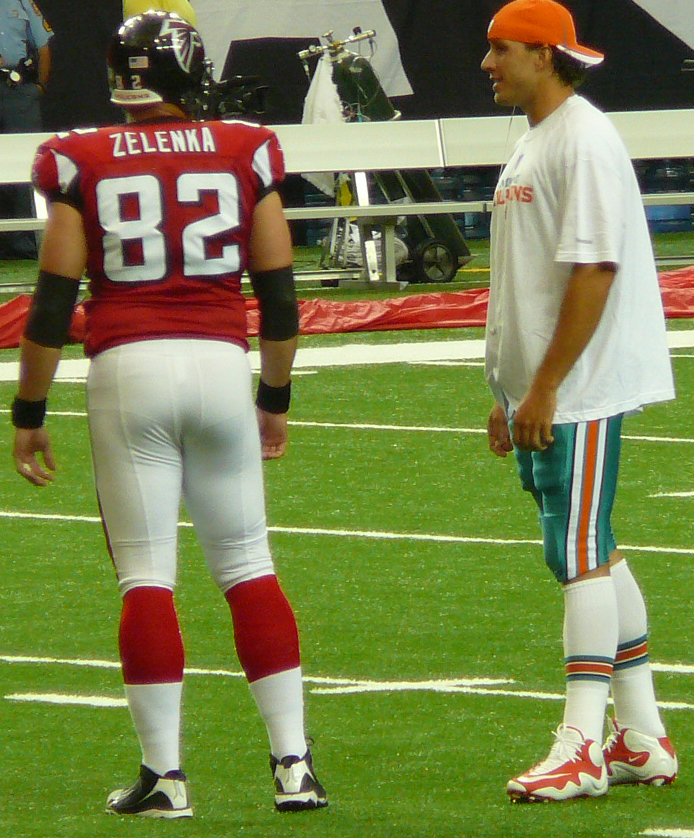
- Zelenka (left) with Dolphins' long snapper John Denney in 2011

No. 52, 85, 83, 88, 82
- Position: Long snapper / Tight end

Personal information
- Born: March 9, 1976 (age 50); Cleveland, Ohio, U.S.
- Listed height: 6 ft 3 in (1.91 m)
- Listed weight: 256 lb (116 kg)

Career information
- High school: Benedictine (Cleveland)
- College: Wake Forest
- NFL draft: 1999: undrafted

Career history
- San Francisco 49ers (1999); Washington Redskins (2000); Jacksonville Jaguars (2001–2008); Atlanta Falcons (2009–2011)

Career NFL statistics
- Games played: 194
- Total tackles: 14
- Fumble recoveries: 1
- Stats at Pro Football Reference

Joseph John Zelenka (born March 9, 1976) is an American former professional football player who was a long snapper in the National Football League (NFL). He played college football for the Wake Forest Demon Deacons and was signed by the San Francisco 49ers as an undrafted free agent in 1999.

Zelenka also played for the Washington Redskins, Jacksonville Jaguars and Atlanta Falcons.

== Early life ==
Joe started playing football at a very early age in the Catholic Youth Organization football league in northern Ohio, playing for the St. Mary's Chargers (Berea, OH).

Zelenka attended Benedictine High School (Cleveland, Ohio) and was a letterman in football. In football, as a senior, he was given the Coaches' Award and was a second-team All-State selection.

== College career ==
Zelenka attended Wake Forest University and in addition to handling longsnapping duties, he was a tight end. As a tight end, he finished his career with 25 receptions for 217 yards (8.68 yards per rec, avg.).
