= The Sportswriters on TV =

US television program

The Sports Writers on TV was a sports talk show produced by John E. Roach for the Chicago-based SportsChannel and syndicated to most of the other regional outlets across the SportsChannel America network. Bill Jauss, Bill Gleason, Ben Bentley and Rick Telander were the usual panelists discussing the topical sports issues of the day, usually Chicago-oriented, but also frequently national in scope. It began airing in 1985 on SportsVision. Joe Mooshill and Lester Munson also appeared semi-regularly, sometimes as fill-in panelists.

The show was a forerunner of sportswriter TV shows that are more common now (The Sports Reporters, Pardon the Interruption, Around the Horn, etc.), and also presaged the rapid expansion of the sports-talk radio genre in the 1980s and 1990s. The weekly program also featured occasional guest appearances by longtime baseball owner Bill Veeck and rock musician Billy Corgan of Chicago-based Smashing Pumpkins.

The show was a video adaptation of The Sportswriters, a long-running radio program on Chicago's WGN. The first airing of Sportswriters on TV was on WFLD in 1985. The set remained the same over the next 15 years of existence. The panel of three sportswriters (usually Jauss, Gleason and Telander) and moderator Bentley (a former public relations executive with the Bulls and before that a longtime boxing promoter) would sit around a poker table, littered with newspapers, and talk sports (frequently veering onto other topics as well).

Unlike most other shows of this nature, the background was usually dark while the table, and the sportswriters sitting around it, was lit. Gleason and Bentley would constantly smoke cigars, and the sportswriters would wear casual clothes (although Bentley normally wore a tie). It was not uncommon to see Jauss wearing a faded pair of blue jeans and a T-shirt with the name of an area bar.

Adding to the informal nature of the show, they would often call each other by their surnames (e.g., "Jauss," "Gleason") as guys sitting around a bar might do. Although the show was meant to evoke the banter of a sports bar, the panelists did not drink beer on camera. While Bentley was introduced as the 'moderator' of the program, and usually did introduce the first topic, individual panelists would introduce topics as part of the flow of conversation, and Bentley usually participated in the discussions, offering opinions along with the others.

The show offered generational variety: Bentley was born in 1920, Gleason 1922, Jauss 1931 and Telander in 1950. Telander often assumed the role of young iconoclast on the show.

After a year on WFLD, it moved to SportsVision, the precursor to SportsChannel Chicago. During its original production run, the show was also syndicated to other regional sports networks in the Midwest, including outlets in Indiana, Wisconsin, Minnesota and Michigan. When the Fox Sports Network purchased SportsChannel in 1997, the show continued until 2000, when Fox decided not to renew the show.
