= Loose Balls =

1990 book by Terry Pluto

Loose Balls: The Short Wild Life of the American Basketball Association
- Author: Terry Pluto
- Language: English
- Publisher: Simon & Schuster
- Publication date: 1990

Loose Balls: The Short Wild Life of the American Basketball Association is a sports book originally published in 1990 by Simon & Schuster. The book, a history of the original American Basketball Association, was written by sportswriter Terry Pluto, although much of his writing is limited to introductions and summaries of each season. Most of the dialogue is from former players, league executives, and journalists, among others.

== The Cast ==
Almost the entire book is told by former players, executives, and journalists, all of whom are listed at the beginning as the "Cast of Characters." Some of those interviewed include:

- Rick Barry
- Pat Boone
- Hubie Brown
- Larry Brown
- Mack Calvin
- Bob Costas
- Mel Daniels
- Julius Erving
- Cotton Fitzsimmons
- Dan Issel
- Slick Leonard
- Rudy Martzke
- George Mikan
- Doug Moe
- Bob Ryan
- Joe Tait
- Lenny Wilkens
- James "Fly" Williams

In the book, the writing is set so that a topic is introduced by Pluto, and then one of the "cast members'" names is highlighted, followed by their memories on the subject. The book covers the entire history of the ABA, from the league's founding in 1967 through the ABA–NBA merger in 1976.
