= Heaven Is a Playground =

1976 book by Rick Telander

- Author: Rick Telander
- Publication date: 1976

Heaven Is a Playground is a 1976 book by Rick Telander. It describes Telander's observations of the streetball culture in Brooklyn during the summer of 1974. Among the players featured in the book are Fly Williams and Albert King. The book was ranked #15 in a 2002 Sports Illustrated list of the Top 100 Sports Books of All Time.

== Critical reception ==
The New York Times wrote: "It is funny, sad, superblywritten and intensely involving without ever being sentimental. In Telander's gifted hands, the lives of a dozen park rats become suddenly important to us, and their fights, drunks, bad trips, their dreams of college stardom and their generally losing battles to escape the suffocation of the ghetto become compelling dramas." Kirkus Reviews called it "a fine projection of how a playground can be heaven to some but hell to those not able to make the leap out."

== Film ==
The 1991 film Heaven Is a Playground is loosely based on the book.
