= Benedictine High School (Ohio) =

Location
- 2900 Martin Luther King Jr. Drive; Cleveland, Ohio 44104; United States; 41.4803°N 81.6104°W

Information
- Type: Private, All-Male
- Motto: Ora et labora (Prayer and work)
- Religious affiliation: Roman Catholic
- Established: 1927
- President: Dave Schroeder '90
- Principal: Dominic Fanelli
- Grades: 9–12
- Enrollment: 343 (2017–18)
- Colors: Columbia blue and white
- Mascot: Bengals
- Accreditation: North Central Association of Colleges and Schools
- Affiliations: Roman Catholic Diocese of Cleveland
- Website: cbhs.net

Benedictine High School is a private Catholic college preparatory high school for boys in Cleveland, Ohio. The school serves grades 9–12 and is a part of the Diocese of Cleveland. The school is run by the monks of St. Andrew Abbey and its sister school is Beaumont School in Cleveland Heights.

== History ==
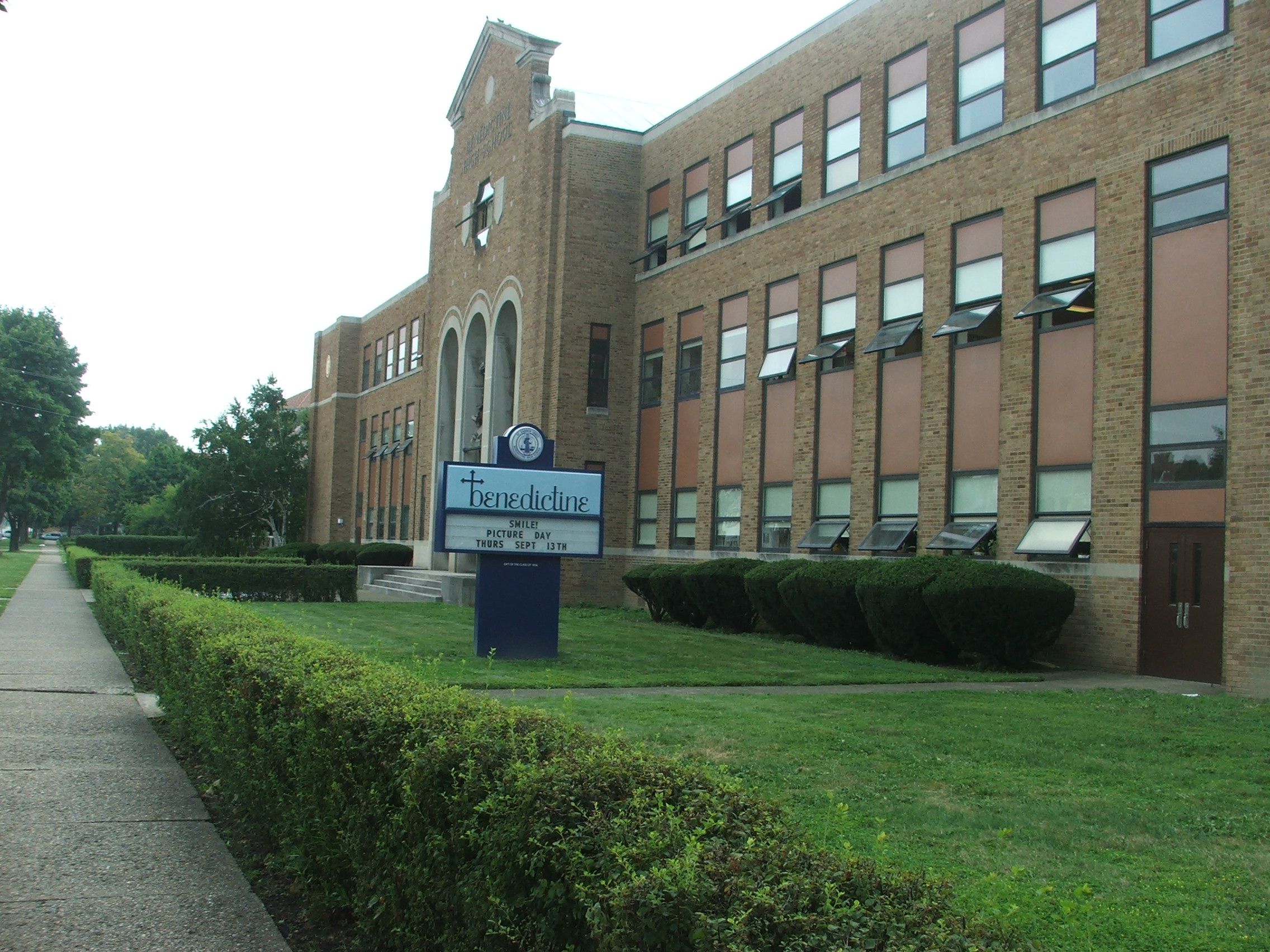
Entrance to Benedictine

Benedictine High School was founded in 1927 by the Benedictine monks of Cleveland. The first location of the school was at East 51st Street and Superior Avenue in Cleveland. The original focus of the founders was to teach the sons of Slovak immigrants. The school grew quickly and in 1929 it relocated to the site of St. Andrew Abbey at 10510 Buckeye Rd. In 1940, with even further enrollment expansion, the school moved to its current location at 2900 Martin Luther King Jr. Drive. The 1950s saw more enrollment growth for the school and increased academic recognition. In the 1960s and 1970s, as the population in Cleveland shifted and the costs of Catholic education rose, school enrollment shrunk.

The school developed a focused college preparatory program, which resulted in over 96% of students going on to college. In the 1980s, to adjust to new circumstances, the school developed an extensive bus system. The system allowed for young men from all over the Cleveland area to attend Benedictine. The 1980s also brought about a capital campaign that sparked improvements in classrooms, and the building of a new church and bell tower. In 2009, the school launched a multimillion-dollar campaign to create a multi-purpose field. The campaign was launched in order to honor three notable individuals affiliated with Benedictine, Coach Augie Bossu, Coach Joe Rufus, and Bishop (Abbot) Roger Gries O.S.B. This field hosts many sporting events, including football, lacrosse, soccer, as well as serving as host to summer sports camps and CYO events.

== Academics ==
Accreditation:

- Ohio State Board of Education
- North Central Association of Colleges and Schools
- Ohio Catholic School Accrediting Association

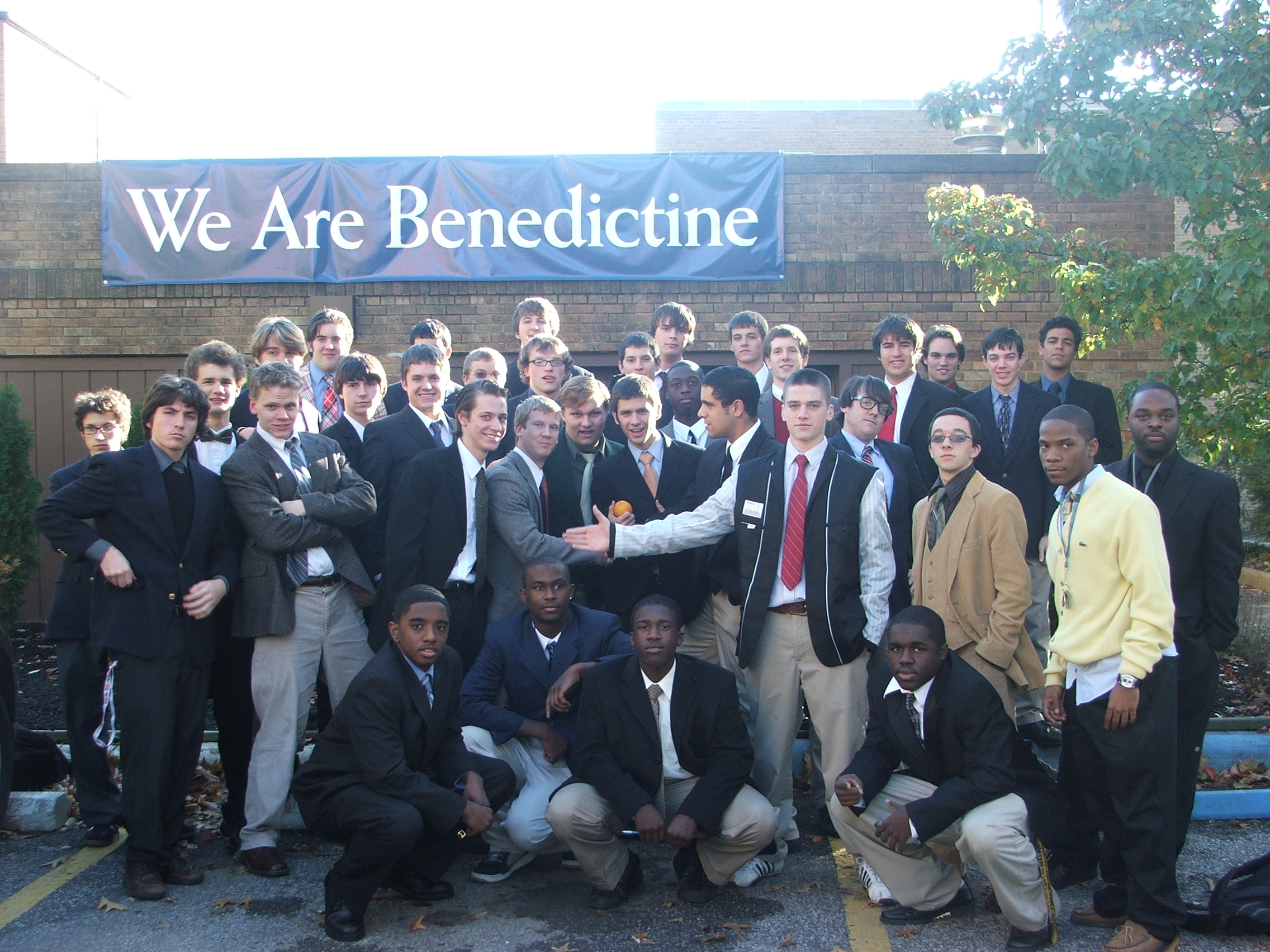
Some of the "Men of Benedictine on business day 2008

To receive a diploma, students must earn 24 credits in college preparatory classes. Because of these and other academic guidelines, over 99% of graduates qualify for college. The average class size is 18 students.

The school has an outstanding academic record, with recent graduates qualifying as National Merit semi finalists, a current Hesburgh Scholar at the University of Notre Dame, and as of 2014, the school boasted acceptance of at least one graduate into one or more of the U.S. military academies in sixteen of the last eighteen years.

The school offers a selection of Advanced Placement courses, including AP English, AP Biology, AP European History, AP US History, AP Government, AP Chemistry, and AP Calculus.

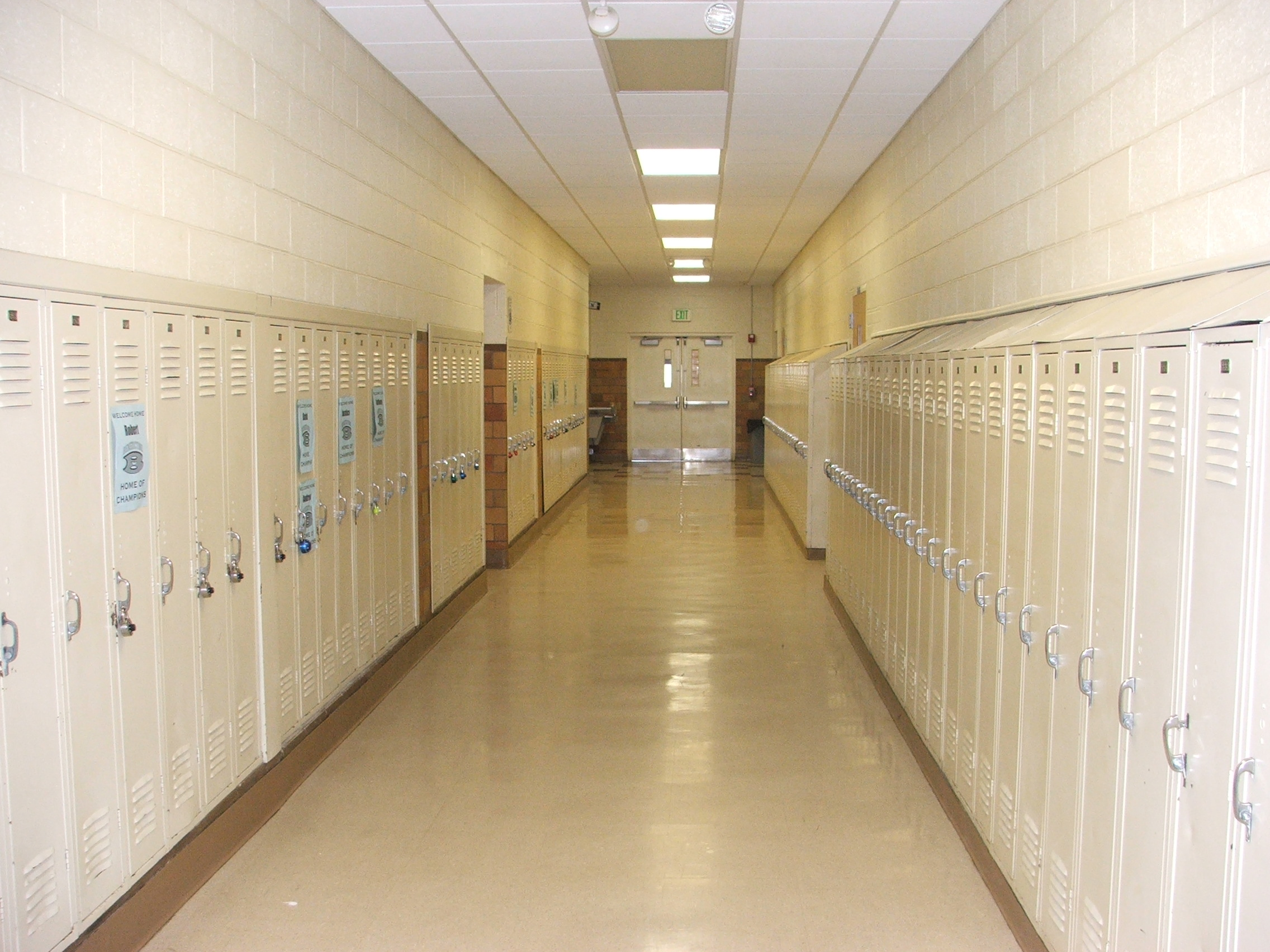
Interior of Benedictine

== Athletics ==
Benedictine, once a member of the Cleveland Senate Athletic League, was a member of the North Coast League from 2011 until the league disbanded in 2020. The school was independent until 2025 when it joined the North Coast Conference in all sports except football, for which Benedictine will join in 2027. Benedictine's athletic rivals are Hoban and Walsh Jesuit. Benedictine is the only school in Ohio to win an OHSAA State Championship in every decade since its inception. One of Benedictine's most famous coaches was Coach Auggie Bossu (Grandfather of current principal Dominic Fanelli). He coached and taught at Benedictine for over 50 years.

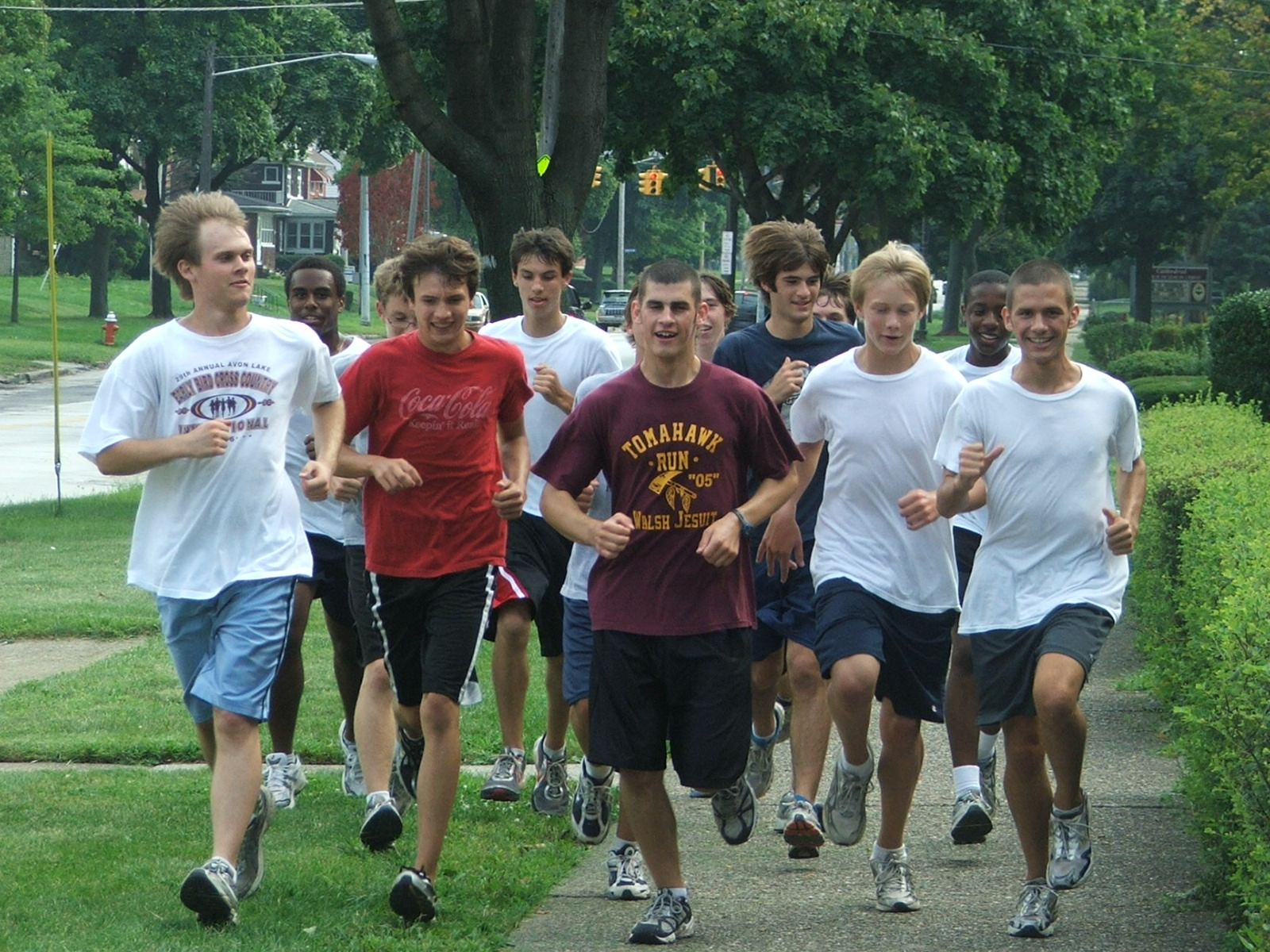
The Benedictine Cross Country team in action

Ohio state championship teams include:

- Basketball - 1997, 1998
- Track & Field - 1997, 1998, 2001
- Football - 1973, 1980, 1981, 1996, 2003, 2004, 2014

Ohio state finalists:

- Baseball - 1956, 1964, 1978
- Football - 2002

Ohio state semifinalists:

- Football - 1987, 1994, 1997
- Basketball - 1999, 2010

== Statistics and achievements ==
The students of Benedictine come from all corners of Northeast Ohio, from suburbs in Cuyahoga, Geauga, Lake, Medina and Portage counties and many neighborhoods in Cleveland. Young men come to Benedictine from nearly 140 grade schools

Benedictine has over 340 students, with an average class size of 19 and a student-to-teacher ratio of 21/1. Nearly 100% of graduates go on to college earning an average of over $5 million in scholarships, grants and financial aid overall. The Class of 2006 boasted five National Merit Scholars, $5.7 million earned and an impressive list of university selections including the University of Notre Dame, Northwestern University, Duquesne University and appointments at West Point and the Air Force Academy. The Class of 2007 also came in at nearly $6 million awarded in scholarship, grant and aid.

== Other activities ==
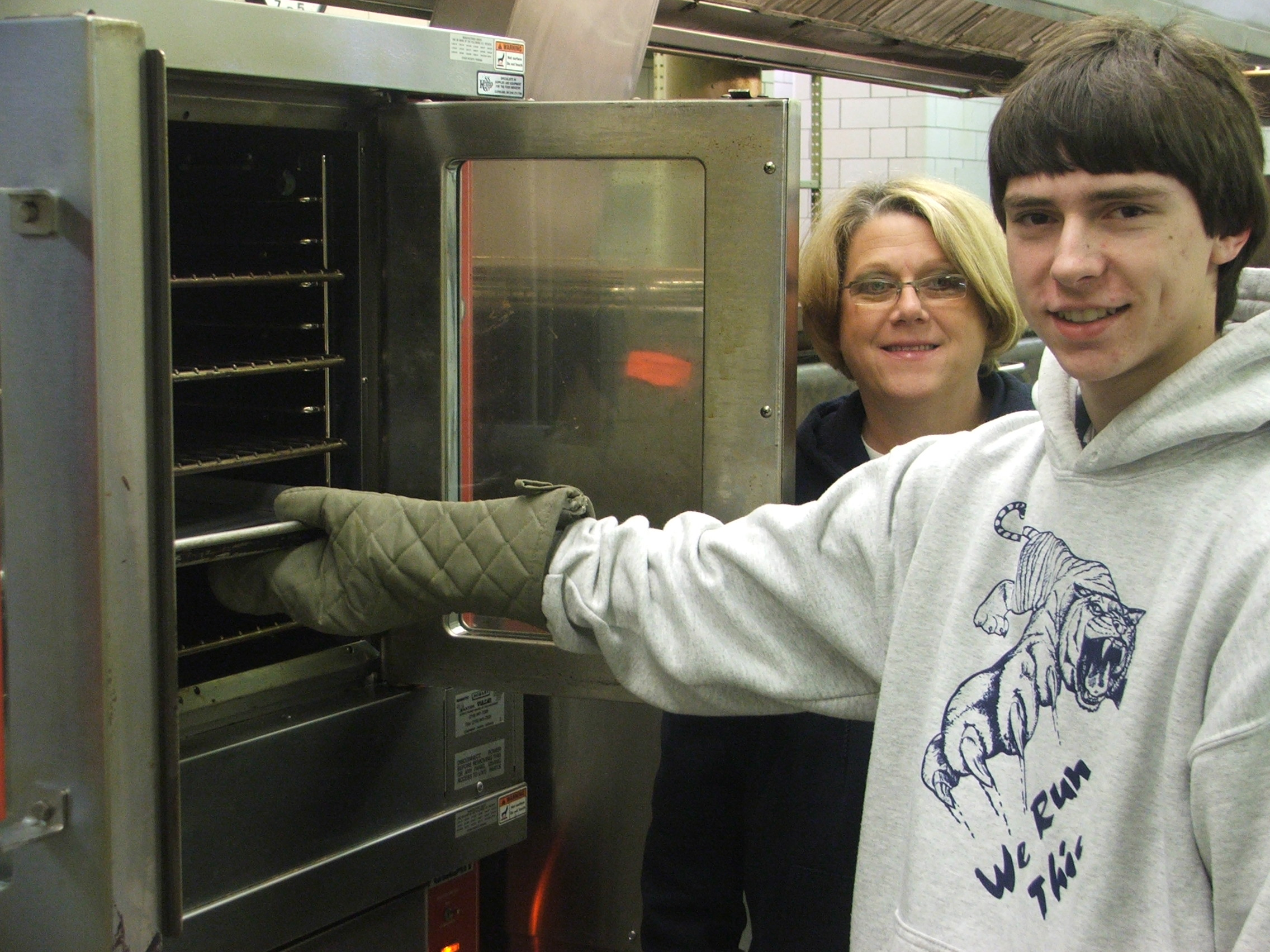
A student participating in Culinary Club

Activities for students include Academic Challenge, Art Club, Band (marching, concert, and jazz), Bennet (school newspaper), Chess Club, Computer Club, Drama Club, Film Club, German Club, Investment Club, Italian Heritage, Key Club, Knights of the Altar, Latin Club, Literary Magazine (Lit Mag), Gaming Club, Marketing Club, National Honor Society, Pro-Life Club, Slovak Association, Speech and Debate, and Yearbook.

=== Academic Challenge ===
Academic Challenge is a television game show in which high school teams answer questions to earn points and is broadcast on WEWS-TV. The team has appeared on the show each year from 2005 to 2008 and returned to the show in 2014 and 2016, each time capturing a victory on their episode. In 2005 and 2008 the school captured the Academic Challenge title and in 2016 earned a spot in the finals. They came away with third place in 2016, earning a $2,500 prize courtesy of sponsor Westfield Insurance.. Most recently, the academic challenge team made an appearance on WEWS broadcast in 2022. They came away with third place against Revere high school and Hawken academy

=== Engineering department and club ===
A new addition to the academic scene at Benedictine is the Engineering Department and Club. Initiated in the spring of 2016 with a Robotics course and its first local engineer guest-speakers and design challenges, the department and club began at roughly the same time. Expanding to include new guests (alumni and other local speakers), field trips to local companies such as Alcoa, Lincoln Electric, and NASA, and expanding the courses to include Raspberry Pi programming, Quadcopters, and Computer-Aided Design, the group of students interested in Engineering has expanded greatly. The Engineering department is housed in Benedictine's growing Makerspace, housing a carbon dioxide laser cutter/engraver as well as multiple 3D printers along with the store which sells Bengal-specific and religious items.

=== Music department ===
Benedictine has three different official bands and one choir. They are the Marching Band, Concert Band, Jazz Band and the Men's Chorus. Apart from the ensembles, Benedictine is home to a Music Technology Lab. This music lab houses 20 Workstations equipped with a Mac Computer, Midi Keyboard, Microphone and computer monitors all designed for student use of software, GarageBand, LogicPro and FruityLoops.

==== Marching band ====
The Benedictine Marching Band is smaller than most other high school bands in Northeast Ohio. The band is made up of Benedictine high schoolers and girls from Beaumont School (Ohio). The band goes to every varsity football game, and also marches in the Columbus Day Parade in Little Italy each October. At the end of each football season, the members of the marching band are expected to play in the school's Concert Band. In recent years, the marching band has grown from 19 members in 2010 to about 45 members in 2014, as of 2023 the band has over 40 members.

==== Concert (Symphonic) band ====
The Concert band plays two concerts each year; one at Christmas and one in the spring. The Concert Band also takes a trip with the remainder of the music department alternating years. Most recently the Concert Band traveled to Nashville along with the Jazz Band and Men's Chorus (2017).

==== Jazz band ====
The Benedictine Jazz Band includes all students enrolled in the "Jazz Band" class and others who join for concert occasions. It performs at concerts with the concert band, and at the annual Blue and White Gala, an annual charity event held by the school

=== Drama club ===
The Benedictine Drama Club performs several productions each school year, with help from sister schools such as Beaumont School (Ohio). Recent performances include Literally a life in Music, Chicago the Musical, “12 Angry Men”, & “The Play that Goes Wrong”. The club was moderated by Father Timothy Buyansky OSB who had directed shows at Benedictine for over 40 years. He died in February 2021 and now has a Senior Drama award named for him.

=== The Bennet (school newspaper) ===
The Bennet is published about eight times per year in four-page issues. The Bennet has won many awards for High School Newspapers.

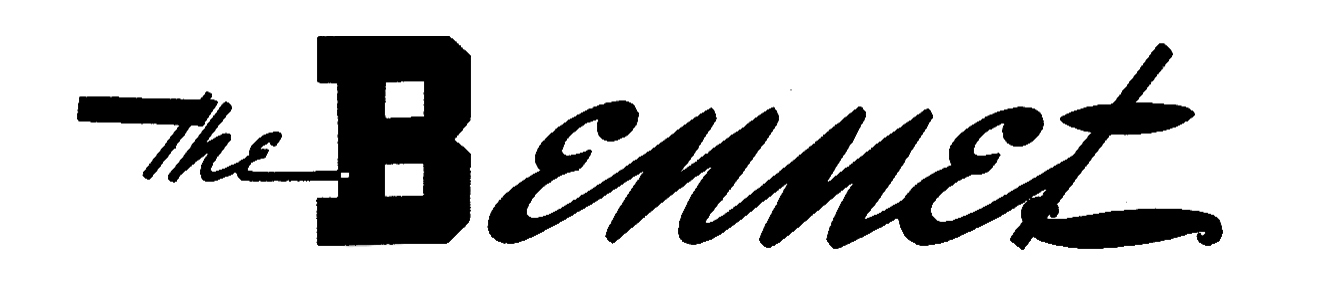
The Bennet's traditional and current banner.

== Notable alumni ==
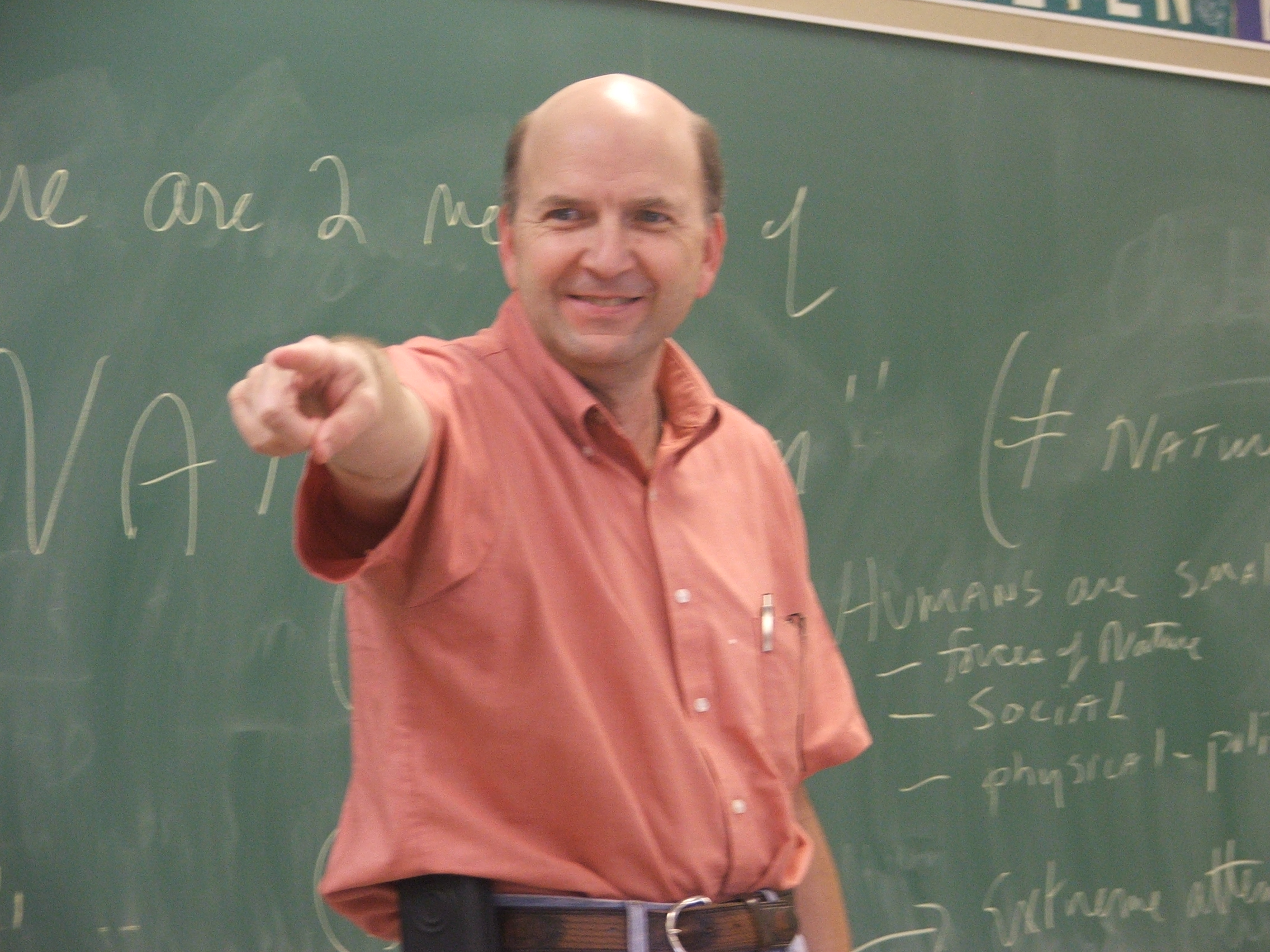
Terry Pluto '73, writer for The Plain Dealer

- Andrew Kaczynski '08 - American journalist and a political reporter, BuzzFeed, CNN
- Jerome Baker Jr. '15 - NFL Linebacker, the Ohio State University, Miami Dolphins, Seattle Seahawks, Tennessee Titans, Cleveland Browns
- Anthony O. Calabrese, Jr. '54 - Ohio state court judge
- Tim Cheatwood '97 - The Ohio State University and pro football player, Cleveland Gladiators of Arena Football League and Canadian Football League all-star
- Cautious Clay ‘11 - American R&B artist
- Mike Easler '69 - professional baseball player, 1979 World Series champion with Pittsburgh Pirates
- Najee Goode '07 - (American Football) - Former NFL Linebacker & Super Bowl Champion
- Bishop Roger Gries, OSB '54 - Auxiliary bishop, Catholic Diocese of Cleveland
- Tom Moriarty - Former professional football player, Atlanta Falcons
- Scott Mruczkowski '00 - professional football player, San Diego Chargers
- Chuck Noll '49 - head coach, Pittsburgh Steelers of National Football League, four-time Super Bowl champion, 1993 inductee in Pro Football Hall of Fame
- Rich Paul '99 - Professional Sports Agent & Founder of Klutch Sports Group
- Terry Pluto '73 - author and award-winning columnist for The Plain Dealer; previously wrote for Akron-Beacon Journal
- Michael Roberts '12 - Former NFL tight end for the Detroit Lions
- Anthony Russo '88 - Emmy winning writer, director, and producer, Avengers: Doomsday, Avengers: Endgame, Avengers: Infinity War, Captain America: Civil War, Captain America: The Winter Soldier, Everything Everywhere All at Once, You, Me and Dupree, Welcome to Collinwood, Arrested Development, Community. Co-Founder and Co-Executive Chairman of AGBO
- Joe Russo '89 - Emmy winning writer, director, and producer, working on Avengers: Doomsday, Avengers: Endgame, Avengers: Infinity War, Captain America: Civil War, Captain America: The Winter Soldier, Everything Everywhere All at Once, You, Me and Dupree, Welcome to Collinwood, Arrested Development, Community. Co-Founder and Co-Executive Chairman of AGBO
- Larry Wanke '86 - Mr. Irrelevant for 1991 NFL draft
- Tom Weiskopf '60 - professional golfer, British Open and U.S. Senior Open champion
- Elijah Whitten '70 - 2 X All America Wrestling Ashland U. & A.U. Hall of Fame 2005. 7 time Ohio Freestyle Open Champ. Coached nationally ranked teams and individuals at U. of Kentucky / Morehead St. U. and Cuyahoga Com. Col. Served as coach to Olympic, Jr. world, and national champs
- Mike Woods - professional football player, Baltimore Colts
- Tommy Zagorski ‘03 - College Football Coach, John Carroll University, Tennessee Volunteers football, Eastern Kentucky Colonels, Akron Zips football
- Joe Zelenka '94 - professional football player, Atlanta Falcons
- Gene Mruczkowski '98 - professional football player, New England Patriots, Miami Dolphins
- John Goode '80 - professional football player, St. Louis Cardinals, Philadelphia Eagles, Detroit Lions, New York Jets, Cincinnati Bengals
