= Rick Telander =

American sports journalist

- Education: Northwestern University
- Occupation: Sports columnist
- Employers: Chicago Sun-Times; Sports Illustrated
- Children: Zack Telander
- Awards: Illinois Sportswriter of the Year, 8 times; Ring Lardner Award for Excellence in Sports Journalism, 2014; Sigma Delta Chi Award and Bronze Medallion, 2018; National Sports Media Association Hall of Fame, 2021

Rick Telander is the senior sports columnist for the Chicago Sun-Times. Hired in 1995 from Sports Illustrated, where he was a Senior Writer, Telander's presence at the newspaper was expected to counter the stable of sports columnists the rival Chicago Tribune had.

== Early life ==
Telander is a native of Peoria, Illinois, and attended Richwoods High School, where he was an All-Conference quarterback. He attended Northwestern University on a football scholarship. He played for coach Alex Agase as a cornerback (and punter junior year), making All-Big Ten his senior season and two-time All-Big Ten Academic. His teammates included Mike Adamle, who is also now a member of the Chicago media. He is the father of notable youtube creator and Olympic-style weightlifting coach Zack Telander.

== Career ==
After graduating from Northwestern, Telander was drafted in the eighth round by the Kansas City Chiefs in 1971. He was cut in training camp. He wrote a book about this experience in 2004, Like a Rose, which was made into a short film by NFL Films in 2013. Soon after, he began his career as a freelance writer, becoming a Special Contributor to Sports Illustrated in 1973. It was that year he went to New York and wrote a lengthy piece entitled "They Always Come Home Again" about college basketball players who return to their city courts in the summer. The next year he moved to New York, where he played basketball on city playgrounds and wrote the book Heaven Is A Playground, which later was made into a movie starring D.B. Sweeney. In the 1980s, Telander was a Senior Writer at Sports Illustrated and was quickly recognized as a rising star.As the college football beat writer in the mid-1980s, he reported on the scandals that plagued the University of Miami, University of Oklahoma, University of South Carolina, and Southern Methodist University. He also observed what he believed to be hypocrisy by the National Collegiate Athletic Association as the college athletes would help the NCAA and the member schools make money, yet wouldn't share in the wealth.

His story about South Carolina’s Tommy Chaikin and the dangers of steroid use, "The Nightmare of Steroids", appeared in SI’s Oct. 24, 1988 issue. Telander's 1990 book The Hundred-Yard Lie addressed the problems in college football.

In December 1985, Telander was invited to be a regular panelist on The Sportswriters on TV, a debut weekly show featuring the Chicago Tribune's Bill Jauss, the Daily Southtown's Bill Gleason and former boxing promoter Ben Bentley. Telander was 25 years younger than the three other panelists. The show, the first of its kind, was nationally syndicated and developed a cult following before concluding its run in 2000 Sports Illustrated.

While with the Sun-Times, Telander continued writing for Sports Illustrated until 1998, when he signed a deal with ESPN. Telander would regularly contribute to ESPN: The Magazine and ESPN.com, appear on ESPN television shows like The Sports Reporters (which some critics viewed as a knockoff of the Sportswriters on TV), and host a radio program on ESPN radio. After the multi-year deal expired, Telander sporadically would contribute to Sports Illustrated, and host a radio show on WSCR.

Telander has won eight Illinois Sportswriter of the Year awards as voted by the National Sportscasters and Sportswriters Association. He has had his work collected in The Best American Sportswriting Anthology eight times and over two dozen other anthologies. He has won nine Peter Lisagor awards for sports journalism. He is the author of eight books, one of which, Heaven Is A Playground, was named one of the Ten Best Sports Books of All Time by Playboy Magazine, and one of the 100 Best Sports Books by Sports Illustrated.

=== 2008 Hall of Fame ballot controversy ===
In January 2008, Telander caused controversy by refusing to submit a 2008 baseball Hall of Fame ballot, citing frustration with steroid issues troubling baseball. He mentioned in his January 9, 2008 Chicago Sun-Times column how he could not trust, and therefore could not vote, for anyone on the ballot. Telander used Andre Dawson as an example of someone he does not believe ever used steroids, but could not be certain about. Of note is the fact that Telander voted for two known steroid users, José Canseco and Ken Caminiti, in the previous year's Hall of Fame ballot. He did this, as he wrote in his Sun-Times column, as a protest, arguing that the shame of steroid users and the "Steroid Era" should be preserved this way for all generations to witness.

The fury erupted very publicly after Chicago sports-talk radio show host Mike North took Telander to task while interviewing Andre Dawson on January 9, 2008. Telander eventually called Dawson personally, read his column to the former star, and the issue was laid to rest. Telander wrote an article that Barry Bonds and Roger Clemens should not get in the Hall of Fame because of their use of steroids and that they lack integrity.

=== Next Year Day ===
In 2008, Telander partnered with The Heckler and owner Brad Zibung to host the 100th Annual Next Year Day. Nearly 1,000 people attended, including famous Cubs fan Bill Murray, who sang with Telander’s band, the Del-Crustaceans. The 101st Annual Next Year Day was held Friday, April 3, 2009, at Harry Caray's Tavern in Chicago's River North neighborhood. Parties were held until the Cubs won the World Series in 2016 The Heckler.

=== Washburn apologizes ===
Former South Carolina assistant coach Jim Washburn, just hired by the Philadelphia Eagles, apologized again in 2011 for steroid scandal he helped create (and which sent him to prison), as documented in Telander’s SI story with Tommy Chaikin.

=== 2013 "Dangerous Obstructions" article ===
In April 2013, Telander wrote an article in the Chicago Sun-Times highlighting dangerous NBA court-side obstructions. Apparently unaware that the Toronto Raptors' baseline signs were images painted on the floor of the court which appear as three-dimensional images on TV, he wrote "The Toronto Raptors have a long ‘Raptors’ sign on the floor, just a foot behind each baseline. The sign sticks up in the air about three feet, like a triangular billboard. Stupid. Stop it". The article was widely mocked.

=== DUI Arrest ===
On July 25, 2021, Telander was charged July 25 with driving under the influence of alcohol, disregarding a traffic control device, speeding, improper lane usage and operating an uninsured motor vehicle after he was stopped in the 2300 block of Lake Avenue, in Wilmette, Illinois.

=== Poetry ===
In 2023, Telander published a collection of 42 poems titled Sweet Dreams: Poems and Paintings for the Child Abed.

== Awards ==
In 2014, Telander was awarded the Ring Lardner Award for Excellence in Sports Journalism by the Union League Club of Chicago. Frank Deford presented Telander with the award.

In 2016, Telander was the guest editor for The 2016 Best American Sports Writing anthology.

In June 2018, he received the Sigma Delta Chi Award and Bronze Medallion for distinguished service from the Society of Professional Journalists, in Washington, D.C.

In January 2021 it was announced that Telander was voted into the National Sports Media Association Hall of Fame in Winston-Salem, NC.

== See also ==
- University of South Carolina steroid scandal
