= St. Andrew Abbey =

Benedictine monastery in Cleveland, Ohio

Coordinates: 41°28′51″N 81°36′42″W

Saint Andrew Abbey
- Interactive map of Saint Andrew Abbey

Monastery information
- Order: Benedictine
- Established: 1922
- Mother house: St. Procopius Abbey
- Diocese: Roman Catholic Diocese of Cleveland
- Controlled churches: Church of the Assumption, Broadview Heights, OH

People
- Founders: Prior Gregory Vanischak, O.S.B.
- Abbot: Rt. Rev. Gary Hoover, O.S.B.

Site
- Location: Cleveland, Ohio, USA
- Public access: Yes
- Website: www.standrewabbey.org

St. Andrew Abbey-Cleveland is a Benedictine monastery in Cleveland, Ohio.

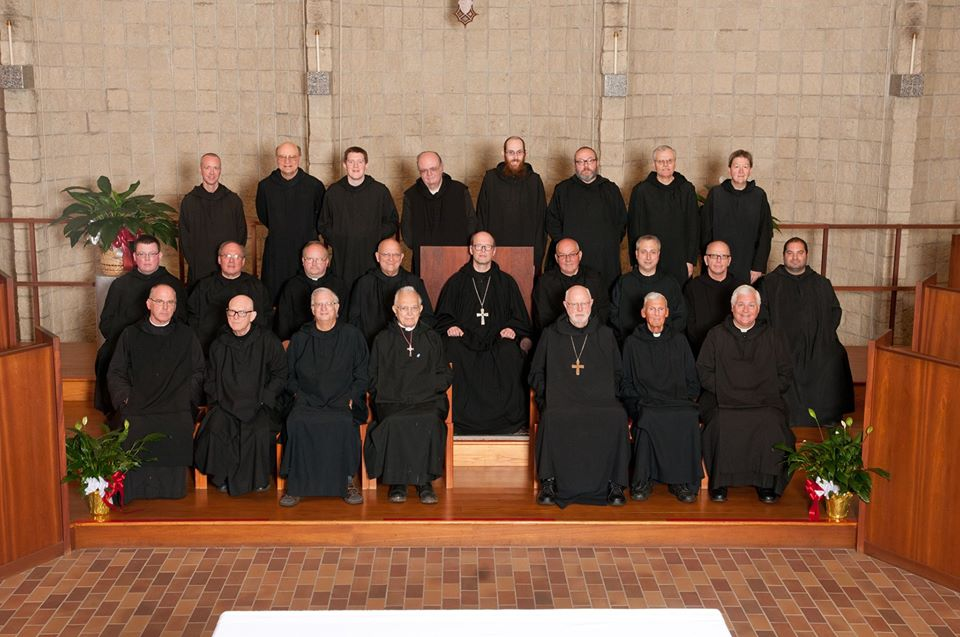
The monks of St. Andrew Abbey at the election of Abbot Gary Hoover, OSB

== Monastic community ==
The members of St. Andrew Abbey are twenty-four solemnly-professed monks, one temporary-professed, and one postulant. The members consist of one bishop, eighteen priests, and five brothers.

== Buildings and grounds ==
A little oasis of 12 acres (4.9 ha) in the heart of the city at Cleveland's highest point offers a view of Cleveland's west side and downtown during the fall and winter. The monastery consists of the abbey church and an east and west wing. The west wing is the cloister which was dedicated in 1952. The abbey church and east wing of the monastery were dedicated in 1986 largely from the generosity of Benedictine High School alumnus Jim Trueman '53. The east wing of the monastery contains a calefactory and refectory, five guest rooms, and the BHS advancement team. The former abbey chapel serves as the library.

The grounds feature a Marian grotto and a Sacred Heart and Saint Michael statues. The property also contains Benedictine High School and a practice field.

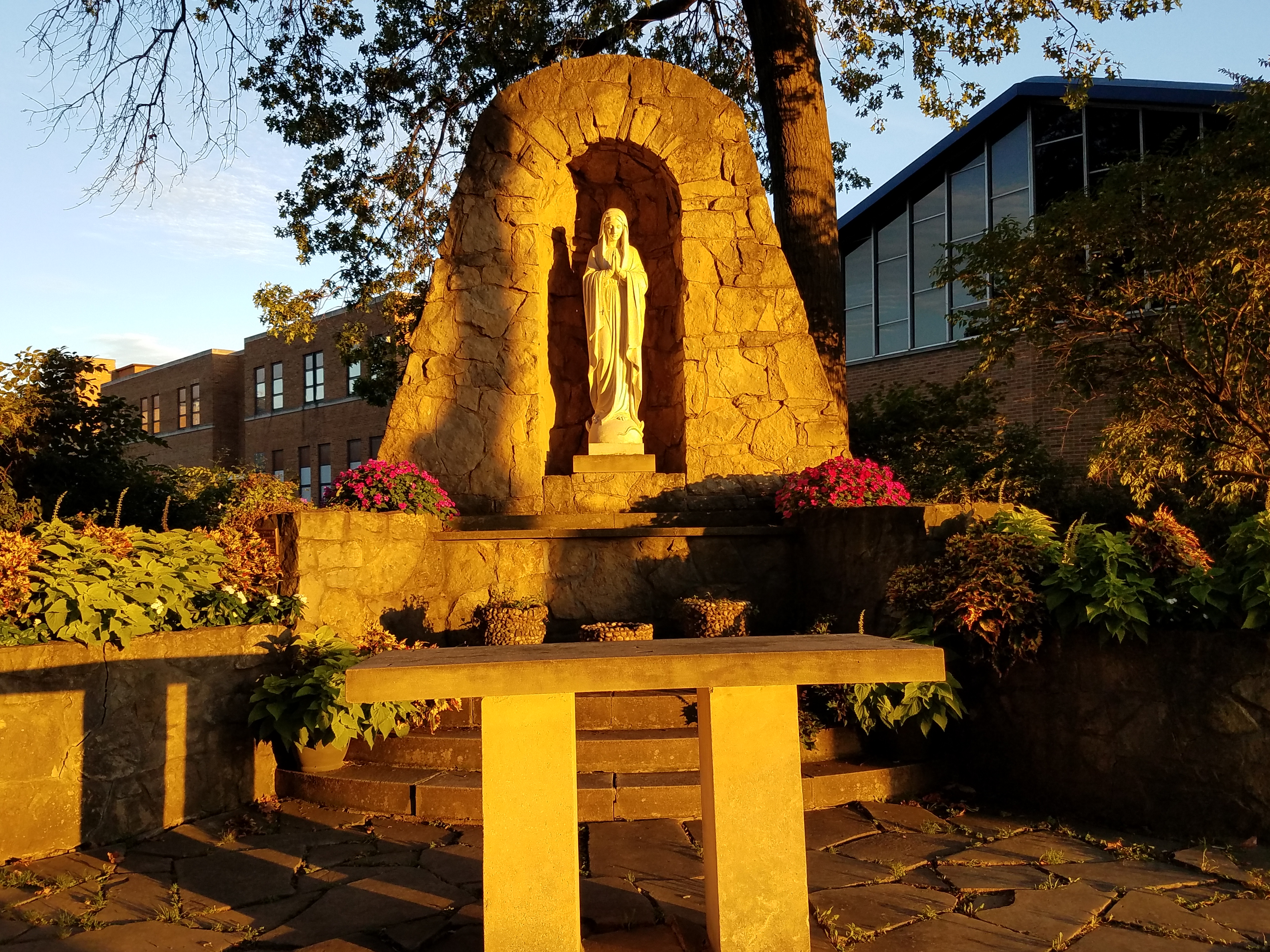
Marian grotto built by the BHS Class of 1954

== Monastic House customs ==
Silence is practiced in the monastery from the conclusion of 7:05 pm Vigils until Lauds. Breakfast is in silence on Fridays during Lent, Advent, and Ordinary Time except on solemnities and feast days. The monks fast and abstain from meat on Fridays except for feast days. The monks observe haustus on Wednesdays after Vespers except during Lent.

== Liturgy of the Hours ==
The monks pray Vigils, Lauds, Midday Prayer, and Vespers together in the abbey church. Compline is prayed privately. Lauds and Vespers are chanted and accompanied with organ. Each office includes a hymn. Mass is celebrated daily with Lauds. Lauds and Mass are celebrated at 6:10 am Monday through Friday and at 7:10 am on Saturday and Sunday. Midday Prayer is prayed at 11:45 am daily. Vespers are prayed Monday, Tuesday, Thursday, Friday and Saturday at 5:20 pm. Vespers are prayed at 5 pm on Wednesday and with Benediction on Sunday at 7:30 pm. Vigils are prayed daily at 7:05 pm, except on Wednesday and Sunday when they are prayed privately. The Divine Office is prayed according to a two-week cycle of Psalms from custom-printed office books. The office is presided by a monk-priest or transitional deacon unless designated by the abbot.

== Lectio Divina ==
Lectio Divina is part of the formation schedule of postulants and novices where it is practiced after breakfast and after work period in the afternoon. Professed monks are encouraged to keep this spiritual reading practice.

== Work ==
Apostolates of St. Andrew Abbey are the staffing of Benedictine High School, sponsorship of Loyola Retreat House, and the Slovak Institute. The monks are also active in parish ministry, chaplaincy, and health ministry. The everyday work of the monastery is done by the monks and laity which includes maintenance, health care, internet technology, and finance. Monks serve in abbatial assignments such as guest master, vocation director, oblate director, formation director, and infirmarian.

== Abbot ==
The abbot is the spiritual father of the community and is elected by the solemnly-professed members of the community. The current abbot Right Reverend is Gary Hoover, OSB, who was elected in 2014. Retired abbots include Bishop Roger William Gries, OSB.

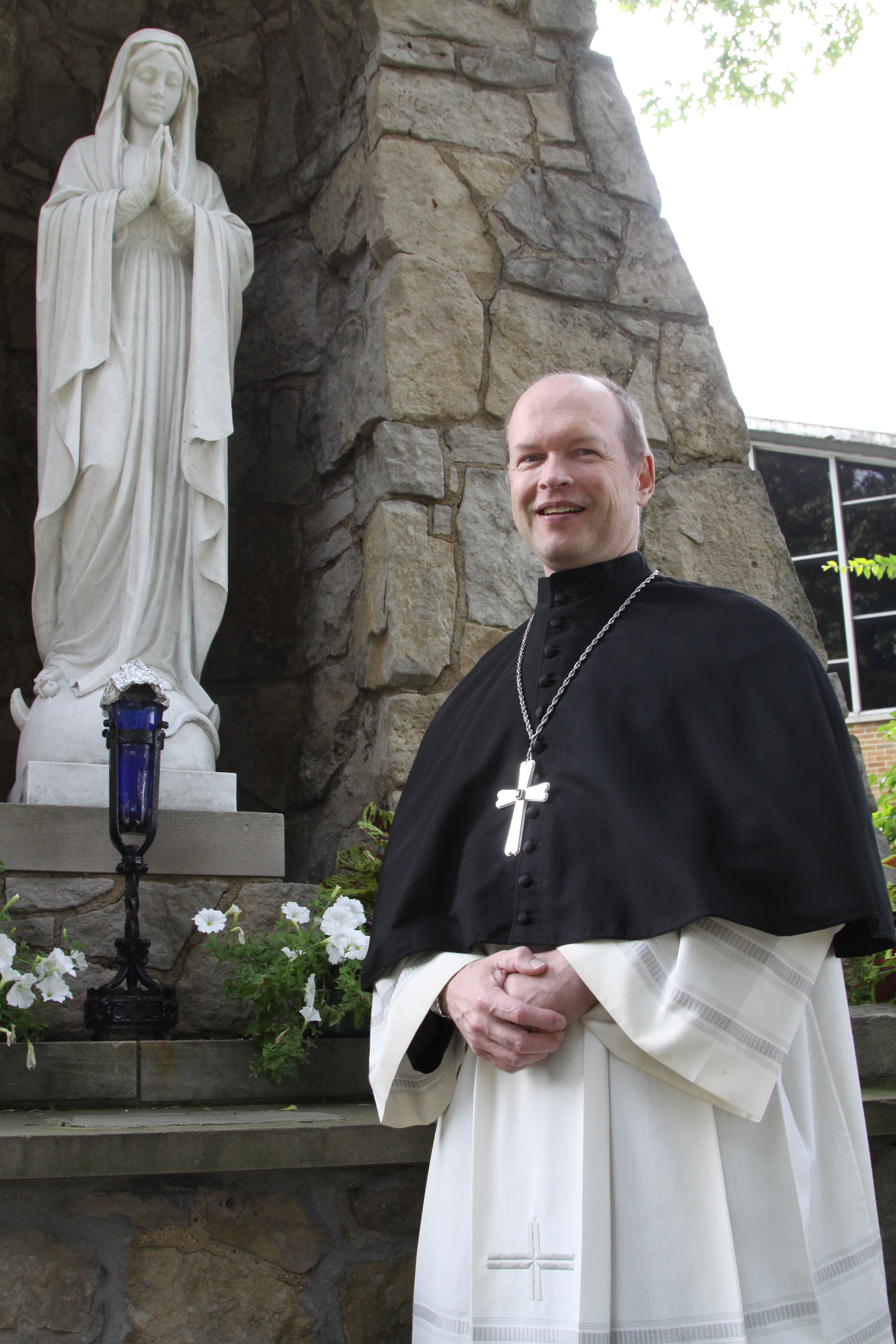
The Right Reverend Gary Hoover, OSB VII Abbot of St. Andrew Abbey

== Vocation discernment ==
Becoming a monk involves time to pray for the Holy Spirit's guidance and visit the abbey to become acquainted with the community before applying for admission. The first step of entering the monastery is a five-to-six month postulancy where the candidate follows the prayer and work schedule of the community. When the candidate is admitted as a novice, he is tonsured, receives a cassock and cincture, and a religious name from the abbot in a private ceremony at Vespers. After a one-year novitiate, the novice is eligible to profess temporary vows. After three years of vows, the junior monk is eligible to profess solemn vows. The monastic vows are conversion of life, obedience, and stability.

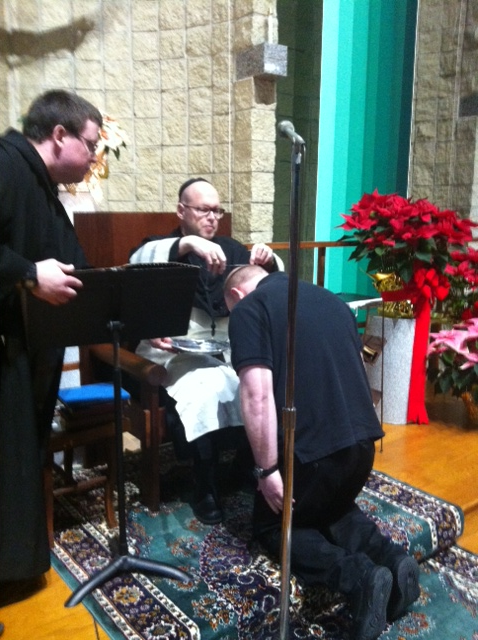
The abbot tonsuring a novice at investiture

== Charism ==
The Benedictine charism is hospitality, especially as it is extended toward guests.

== Oblates ==
Men and women may desire to apply the Rule of St. Benedict to their spiritual life as oblates. As lay members of the monastic community, oblates practice Benedictine spirituality in the quiet of their homes. Oblates of St. Andrew Abbey participate in the mission of the abbey according to their state in life. Oblate meetings are held monthly between September and May and are directed by Rev. Bede Kotlinski, OSB.

== Benedictine hallmarks ==
The Benedictine hallmarks are the key values from the Rule of St. Benedict for living a holy life. The hallmarks are lived by the monks and are taught by the Benedictine High School theology staff and to the oblates of Saint Andrew Abbey. The hallmarks are community, prayer, hospitality, stability, discipline, stewardship, humility, conversatio, obedience, and love of Christ and neighbor.
