= Terry Pluto =

American journalist (born 1955)

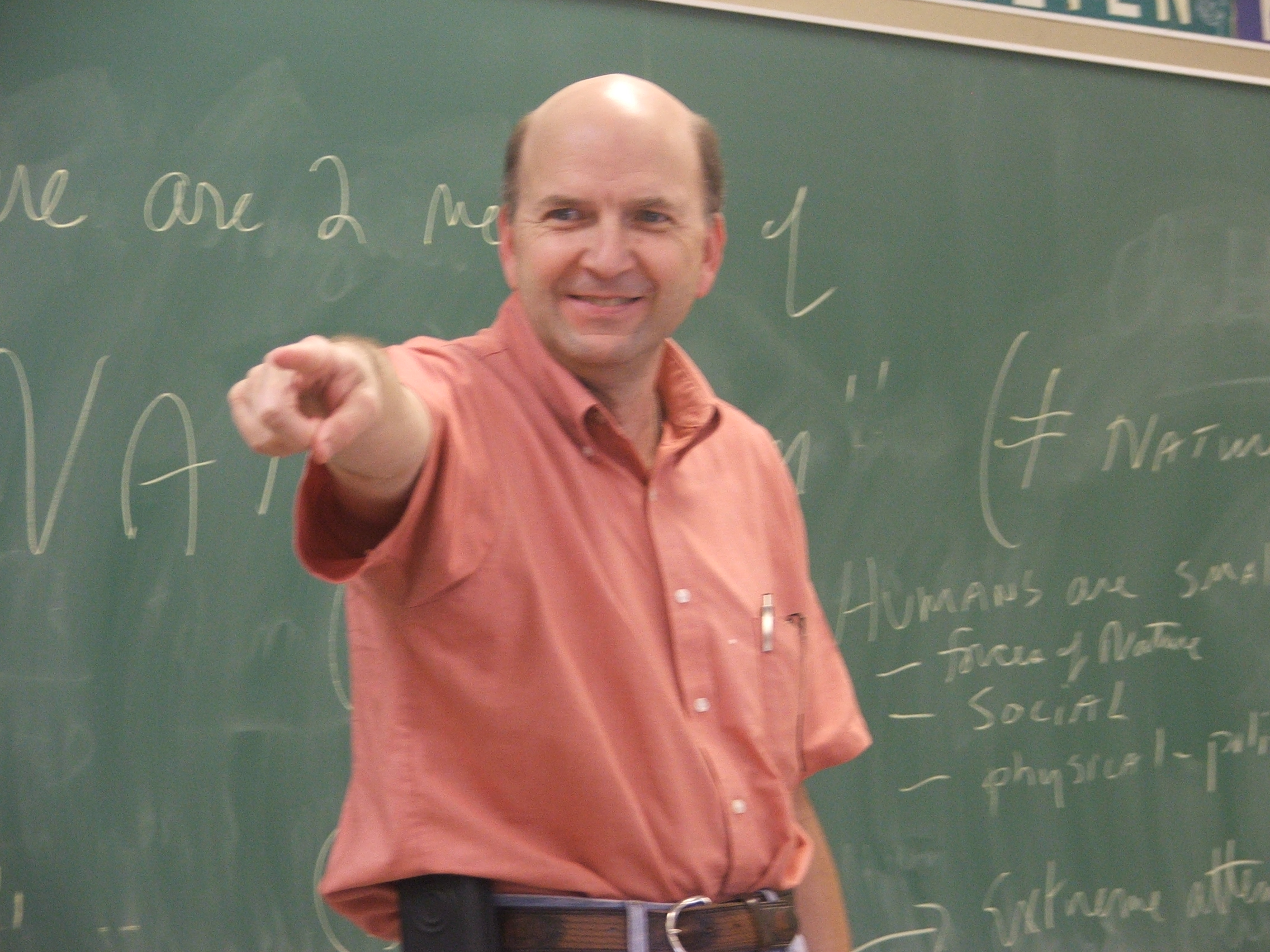
- Terry Pluto lecturing students on writing in a visit to his alma mater Benedictine High School in Cleveland
- Born: June 12, 1955 (age 71); Cleveland, Ohio, U.S.
- Education: Cleveland State University
- Occupations: Sportswriter, author
- Organization: Baseball Writers' Association of America
- Website: www.terrypluto.com

Terry Pluto (born June 12, 1955) is an American sportswriter, newspaper columnist, and author who primarily writes columns for The Plain Dealer, and formerly for the Akron Beacon Journal about Cleveland, Ohio sports and religion.

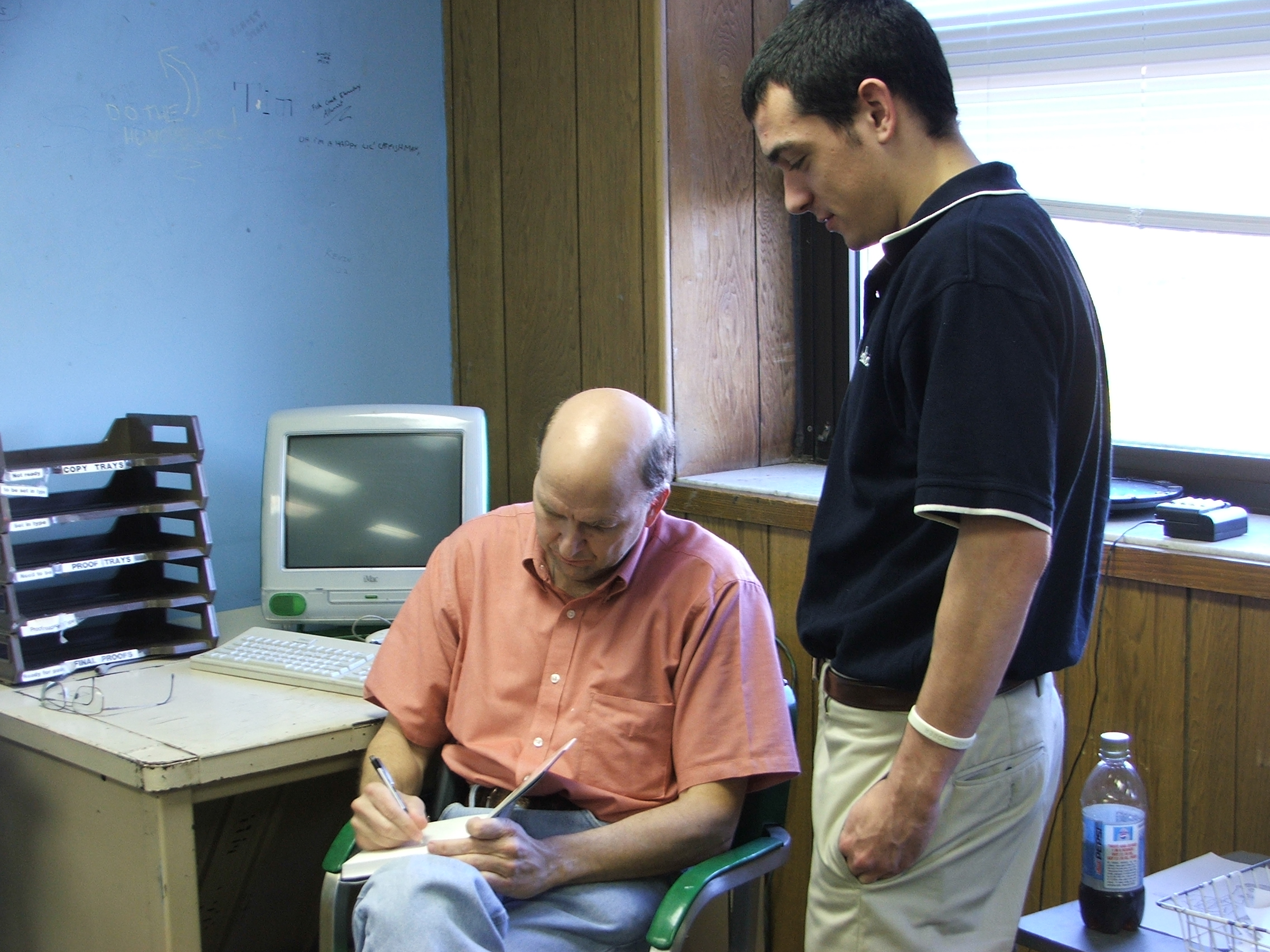
Pluto signing one of his books for a Benedictine High School student

Pluto is a graduate of Benedictine High School in Cleveland, and received a degree in secondary education from Cleveland State University, with a major in Social Studies and a minor in English.

On August 14, 2007, Pluto announced he was leaving the Beacon Journal to return to The Plain Dealer. He cited the larger circulation and ability to write for his hometown paper as reasons for leaving. Pluto began at The Plain Dealer on September 2, 2007.

Since joining The Plain Dealer, Pluto's stories and columns have contributed to the paper becoming a three-time Ohio Associated Press Award winner for Best Daily Sports Section (2007, 2010, 2011 - Division V)

== Books ==
=== Sports ===
- The Greatest Summer: The Remarkable Story of Jim Bouton's Comeback to MLB, (1979)
- Earl of Baltimore, (1982) ISBN 0-8329-0125-3
- A Baseball Winter: The Off-Season Life of the Summer Game, (Jeffrey Neuman, Editor, 1986) ISBN 0-02-597760-1
- Forty-Eight Minutes: A Night in the Life of the NBA, (Co-Written with Bob Ryan, 1989) ISBN 0-02-597770-9
- Bull Session: An Up-Close Look at Michael Jordan and Courtside Stories About the Chicago Bulls, (Co-Written with Johnny 'Red' Kerr, 1989) ISBN 0-929387-01-5
- Loose Balls: The Short, Wild Life of the American Basketball Association, (1990) ISBN 0-671-74921-8
- Tall Tales: Glory Years of the NBA..., (1992) ISBN 0-8032-8766-6
- The Curse of Rocky Colavito: A Loving Look at a Thirty-Year Slump, (reprint ed., 1995) ISBN 0-684-80415-8
- Burying the Curse: How the Indians Became the Best Team in Baseball, (1995) ISBN 0-9649902-3-7
- Falling From Grace, (1995) ISBN 0-684-80766-1
- Browns Town 1964: The Cleveland Browns and the 1964 Championship(1997)
- When All the World Was Browns Town, (1997) ISBN 0-684-82246-6
- Our Tribe : A Baseball Memoir, (1999) ISBN 0-684-84505-9
- Unguarded : My Forty Years Surviving in the NBA, (Co-Written with Lenny Wilkens, 2001) ISBN 0-684-87374-5
- The View from Pluto: Collected Sportswriting About Northeast Ohio, (2002) ISBN 1-886228-62-0
- Weaver on Strategy: Classic Work on Art of Managing a Baseball Team, (Co-Written with Earl Weaver, 2002) ISBN 1-57488-424-7
- False Start: How The New Browns Were Set Up To Fail, (2004) ISBN 1-886228-88-4
- Dealing: The Cleveland Indians' New Ballgame: Inside the Front Office and the Process of Rebuilding a Contender 2006) ISBN 1-59851-022-3
- The Franchise: Lebron James and the Remaking of the Cleveland Cavaliers, (Co-Written with Brian Windhorst, 2007) ISBN 1-59851-028-2
- LeBron James: The Making of an MVP, (Co-Written with Brian Windhorst, 2009) ISBN 978-1-59851-059-1
- Things I've Learned From Watching The Browns, 2010 ISBN 978-1-59851-065-2
- Joe Tait: It's Been a Real Ball, (Co-Written with Joe Tait), 2011 ISBN 978-1-59851-070-6
- Glory Days in Tribe Town: The Cleveland Indians and Jacobs Field 1994–1997, (Co-written with Tom Hamilton), 2014 ISBN 978-1-938441-35-6

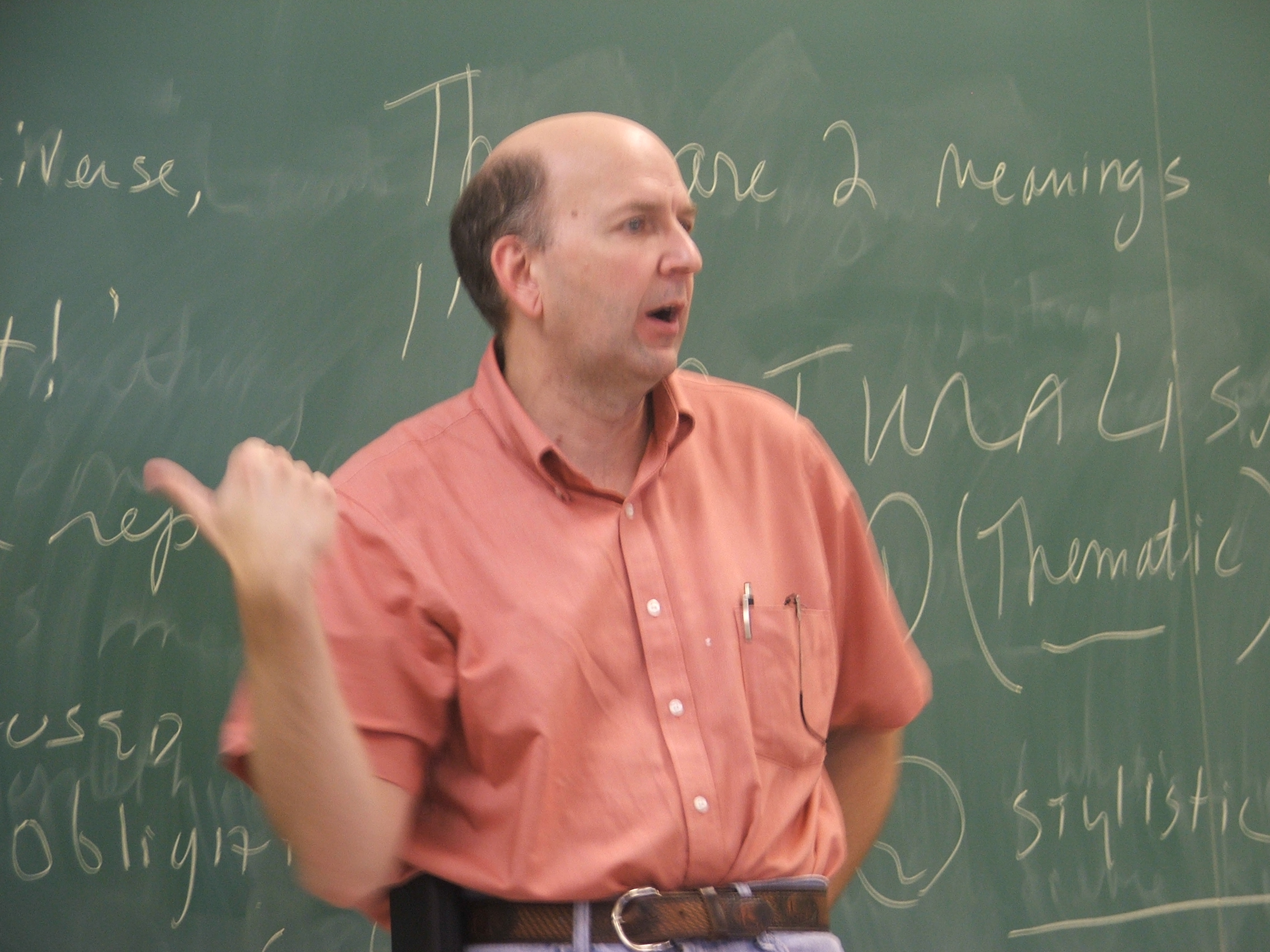
Pluto giving a speech at Benedictine

=== Religion ===
- Everyday Faith, (2004) ISBN 1-886228-81-7
- Faith And You: Making Faith Work in Everyday Life, (2005) ISBN 1-59851-015-0
- Champions for Life: The Healing Power of a Father's Blessing, (Co-written with Bill Glass, 2005) ISBN 0-7573-0250-5
- Faith And You Volume II: More Essays on Faith in Everyday Life, (2012) ISBN 978-1-938441-12-7

=== Edited by Terry Pluto ===
- Tark: College Basketball's Winningest Coach, by Jerry Tarkanian, (1988) ISBN 0-07-062802-5
- Sixty-One: The Team, the Record, the Men, by Tony Kubek, (reprint ed., 1989) ISBN 0-671-67539-7

== See also ==
- Curse of Rocky Colavito

== Awards ==
- Eight-time NSSA Ohio Sportswriter of the Year (1989, 1993, 1994, 1996, 1999, 2001, 2002, 2003, 2007)
- 2005 inductee - Cleveland Press Club Journalism Hall of Fame
- 2008 Chuck Heaton Award winner (inaugural award recipient)
- 2010 Ohio Associated Press Best Sports Writer
