= Kenny Hutchinson =

Basketball player

Personal information
- Born: December 13, 1963 (age 62) Laie, Hawaii, U.S.
- Listed height: 6 ft 3 in (1.91 m)
- Listed weight: 190 lb (86 kg)

Career information
- High school: Benjamin Franklin (Manhattan, New York); Martin Luther King (Manhattan, New York)
- College: Arkansas (1984–1987)
- Position: Point guard / shooting guard

Career highlights
- Second-team Parade All-American (1983)

Kenny Hutchinson (born December 13, 1963) is an American former basketball player. He emerged as a top college prospect while playing basketball in New York City at Benjamin Franklin High School and Martin Luther King Jr. High School. While playing at Franklin, Hutchinson was part of a star line-up alongside Richie Adams, Gary Springer and Walter Berry. He won a state championship in 1982 before the school closed down that same year. Hutchinson transferred to King for his final year, where he was named a second-team Parade All-American in 1983. During his high school years, he was an avid streetball basketball player at Rucker Park participating in the Entertainer's Basketball Classic.

Hutchinson was recruited by the defending NCAA champions NC State, but he elected to enrol at the University of Arkansas to play for the Razorbacks. Hutchinson did not originally qualify for a scholarship but eventually made the team in 1984. Though naturally a point guard, Hutchinson played as a shooting guard at Arkansas. Cocaine abuse cut down his time as a player as he tested positive for the drug twice during his time at the school. He was suspended alongside teammate William Mills for the last four games of the 1985–86 season because of drug abuse. Hutchinson and Mills checked themselves into an alcohol and drug treatment center in Fayetteville, Arkansas, for a one-month stay. They were allowed to rejoin the Razorbacks by head coach Nolan Richardson but without their scholarships and with the promise to stay clean. Hutchinson returned as a walk-on during his redshirt junior season in 1986–87. He played sparingly and chose to leave the team in 1987. Hutchinson averaged 2.6 points during his three seasons with the Razorbacks.

On April 3, 1989, Hutchinson was arrested and charged with delivery of cocaine. A police informant working undercover bought cocaine from Hutchinson at an apartment near the University of Arkansas campus. A felony warrant was issued in March and Hutchinson eventually turned himself in to detectives. He was convicted and spent 18 months in prison.

Mills was murdered in 1991 which Hutchinson credited as a turning point in his life. In a 1994 interview, he claimed that he had been off drugs since Mills' death. Hutchinson attended the City College of New York in 1994 to complete the remaining credits of his degree with the aspiration of becoming a teacher.
