= 1984–85 UNLV Runnin' Rebels basketball team =

American college basketball season

1984–85 UNLV Runnin' Rebels basketball

PCAA tournament champions PCAA Regular Season Champions

NCAA tournament, Second round
- Conference: Pacific Coast Athletic Association

Ranking
- Coaches: No. 9
- AP: No. 9
- Record: 28–4 (17–1 PCAA)
- Head coach: Jerry Tarkanian (12th season)
- Assistant coaches: Tim Grgurich; Mark Warkentien; Cleveland Edwards
- Home arena: Thomas & Mack Center

1984–85 Pacific Coast Athletic Association men's basketball standings
	Conf.				Overall
Team	W		L	PCT	W		L	PCT
No. 9 UNLV†	17	–	1	.944	28	–	4	.875
Fresno State	15	–	3	.833	23	–	9	.719
Cal State Fullerton	11	–	7	.611	17	–	13	.567
Utah State	10	–	8	.556	17	–	11	.607
San Jose State	10	–	8	.556	16	–	13	.552
UC Irvine	8	–	10	.444	12	–	16	.429
UC Santa Barbara	8	–	10	.444	12	–	16	.429
Pacific	5	–	13	.278	9	–	19	.321
New Mexico State	4	–	14	.222	7	–	20	.259
Long Beach State	2	–	16	.111	4	–	23	.148
† 1985 PCAA tournament winner

The 1984–85 UNLV Runnin' Rebels basketball team represented the University of Nevada Las Vegas in NCAA Division I men's competition in the 1984–85 season under head coach Jerry Tarkanian. The team played its home games in the Thomas & Mack Center, and was a member of the Pacific Coast Athletic Association (PCAA), now known as the Big West Conference. The Rebels won the regular season conference and PCAA Tournament titles. The team finished with a record of 28–4 (17–1 PCAA).

== Roster ==
1984–85 UNLV Runnin' Rebels men's basketball team
Players
Coaches

Pos.	#	Name	Height	Weight	Year	Hometown
G/F	11	Anthony Jones	6 ft 6 in (1.98 m)	190 lb (86 kg)	Jr	Washington, D.C.
G	13	Freddie Banks	6 ft 2 in (1.88 m)	155 lb (70 kg)	So	Las Vegas, Nevada
F	20	Ed Catchings	6 ft 7 in (2.01 m)	—	Sr
F	30	Leon Symanski	6 ft 7 in (2.01 m)	210 lb (95 kg)	So	Orange, California
C	31	Richie Adams	6 ft 9 in (2.06 m)	—	Sr	Harlem, New York
G	32	Gary Graham	6 ft 4 in (1.93 m)	185 lb (84 kg)	So	Baltimore, Maryland
G/F	33	Eldridge Hudson	6 ft 6 in (1.98 m)	215 lb (98 kg)	So	Carson, California
F/C	35	Armon Gilliam	6 ft 9 in (2.06 m)	225 lb (102 kg)	So	Pittsburgh, Pennsylvania

Head coach

- Jerry Tarkanian (Fresno State)

Assistant coach(es)

- Tim Grgurich (Pittsburgh)
- Mark Warkentien (Cal State Fullerton)
- Ralph Readout (Ohio)

Legend

- (C) Team captain
- (S) Suspended
- (I) Ineligible
- (W) Walk-on
- Injured
- Current redshirt

Roster

== Schedule and results ==
Date time, TV	Rank^{#}	Opponent^{#}	Result	Record	Site (attendance) city, state
Regular season
Nov 23, 1984*	No. 11	at Nevada	L 89–97	0–1	Lawlor Events Center; Reno, Nevada
Dec 1, 1984*	No. 20	at Colorado State	W 88–78	1–1	Moby Arena; Fort Collins, Colorado
Dec 8, 1984*	No. 20	at No. 1 Georgetown	L 46–82	1–2	Capital Centre; Washington, D.C.
Dec 18, 1984*		Nevada	W 86–77	2–2	Thomas & Mack Center; Las Vegas, Nevada
Dec 20, 1984*		SW Louisiana	W 84–55	3–2	Thomas & Mack Center; Las Vegas, Nevada
Dec 21, 1984*		McNeese State	W 84–73	4–2	Thomas & Mack Center; Las Vegas, Nevada
Dec 27, 1984*		Arkansas State	W 78–71	5–2	Thomas & Mack Center; Las Vegas, Nevada
Dec 28, 1984*		Kansas State	W 77–68	6–2	Thomas & Mack Center; Las Vegas, Nevada
Jan 2, 1985		at Utah State	W 142-140	7–2	Dee Smith Spectrum; Logan, Utah
Jan 5, 1985		at San Jose State	W 80-65	8–2	San Jose Civic Auditorium; San Jose, California
Jan 10, 1985		Pacific	W 68-57	9–2	Thomas & Mack Center; Las Vegas, Nevada
Jan 12, 1985		Fresno State	W 70-58	10–2	Thomas & Mack Center; Las Vegas, Nevada
Jan 16, 1985		at UC Santa Barbara	W 93-76	11–2	The Thunderdome; Santa Barbara, California
Jan 19, 1985*		Maryland	W 78-76	12–2	Thomas & Mack Center; Las Vegas, Nevada
Jan 21, 1985	No. 20	Cal State Fullerton	W 83-69	13–2	Thomas & Mack Center; Las Vegas, Nevada
Jan 24, 1985	No. 20	at New Mexico State	W 92-70	14–2	Pan American Center; Las Cruces, New Mexico
Jan 26, 1985	No. 20	at Long Beach State	W 75-61	15–2	Long Beach Arena; Long Beach, California
Jan 31, 1985	No. 16	San Jose State	W 70-56	16–2	Thomas & Mack Center; Las Vegas, Nevada
Feb 2, 1985	No. 16	Utah State	W 101-83	17–2	Thomas & Mack Center; Las Vegas, Nevada
Feb 7, 1985	No. 11	at Pacific	W 97-72	18–2	Alex G. Spanos Center; Stockton, California
Feb 9, 1985	No. 11	at Fresno State	L 52-63	18–3	Selland Arena; Fresno, California
Feb 16, 1985	No. 14	at UC Irvine	W 99-89	19–3	Crawford Hall; Irvine, California
Feb 18, 1985	No. 11	at Cal State Fullerton	W 78-69	20–3	Titan Gym; Fullerton, California
Feb 21, 1985	No. 11	New Mexico State	W 80-67	21-3	Thomas & Mack Center; Las Vegas, Nevada
Feb 23, 1985	No. 11	UC Santa Barbara	W 81-71	22-3	Thomas & Mack Center; Las Vegas, Nevada
Feb 27, 1985	No. 9	UC Irvine	W 97-95	23-3	Thomas & Mack Center; Las Vegas, Nevada
Mar 2, 1985	No. 9	Long Beach State	W 84-61	24-3	Thomas & Mack Center; Las Vegas, Nevada
PCAA tournament
Mar 5, 1985*	No. 11	vs. Pacific; Quarterfinals	W 89–58	25–3	The Forum; Inglewood, California
Mar 6, 1985*	No. 11	vs. San Jose State; Semifinals	W 60–59	26–3	The Forum; Inglewood, California
Mar 7, 1985*	No. 11	vs. Cal State Fullerton; Championship game	W 79–61	27–3	The Forum; Inglewood, California
NCAA tournament
Mar 14, 1985*	(4 W) No. 9	vs. (13 W) San Diego State; First round	W 85–80	28–3	Jon M. Huntsman Center; Salt Lake City, Utah
Mar 16, 1985*	(4 W) No. 9	vs. (12 W) Kentucky; Second round	L 61–64	28–4	Jon M. Huntsman Center; Salt Lake City, Utah
*Non-conference game. ^{#}Rankings from AP poll. (#) Tournament seedings in parentheses. W=West.

== Rankings ==
Ranking movements Legend: ██ Increase in ranking ██ Decrease in ranking — = Not ranked т = Tied with team above or below
	Week																
Poll	Pre	1	2	3	4	5	6	7	8	9	10	11	12	13	14	15	Final
AP	11	20	20	—	—	—	—	—	—	20	16	11	14	11	9	11	9
Coaches	Not released	16	20	—	—	—	—	—	—	19 т	13	12	16	11	10	10	9

== Awards and honors ==
- Richie Adams – PCAA Player of the Year (2x)

== See also ==
- UNLV Runnin' Rebels basketball
- 1985 NCAA Division I men's basketball tournament
