= Larry Williams (basketball) =

American basketball player

Personal information
- Nickname: Bone Collector
- Born: June 19, 1981 (age 45) Tyler, Texas, United States
- Height: 6 ft 0 in (1.83 m)
- Weight: 200 lb (91 kg)
- Website: https://bonecollector.store

Sport
- Sport: Basketball
- Event: Streetball
- College team: Chaffey Junior College
- Team: Ball Up Tour (2011–2016); Entertainers Basketball Classic MVP 5 Years Straight (2001–2006); AND1 Mixtape Tour (2007–2011)
- Turned pro: 2001
- Now coaching: San Gabriel Adventist Academy (2012 – Present)

Larry "Bone Collector" Williams (born June 19, 1981) is an American streetball basketball player who earned the name the Bone Collector for his ability to "break players' ankles". He was named in ESPN's "Elite 24: Rucker Park legends".

Williams was born in Texas and grew up in Southern California. He later played at Chaffey Junior College and later the Globe Institute of Technology in New York City. While in New York City, he became an elite player at the Rucker Park. In China, as covered by USA Today he crossed over a player out of his shoes. He challenged players including Allen Iverson to 1 on 1 games. He also challenged Kobe Bryant to a $50,000 one on one game. He was named the Most Dangerous Streetball Player in the World by SLAM magazine. He also became a personal trainer for NBA and collegiate players at various basketball clinics worldwide. He is currently the assistant coach to San Gabriel Adventist Academy Boys Varsity team in San Gabriel, CA, where he helped coach the team to California Division State Champions during the 2013 – 2014 season. He made a name for himself after he won the Entertainers Basketball Classic (EBC – Rucker Park) MVP 5 years in a row from 2001 to 2006. He was named one of Complex (magazine)'s 25 Greatest Streetball Players of All Time and one of the Street Basketball Association's 50 best players of all time. Williams made a cameo appearance in a feature film Bompton Had a Dream that was released on April 22, 2020.
