= Earl Manigault =

American street basketball player (1944–1998)

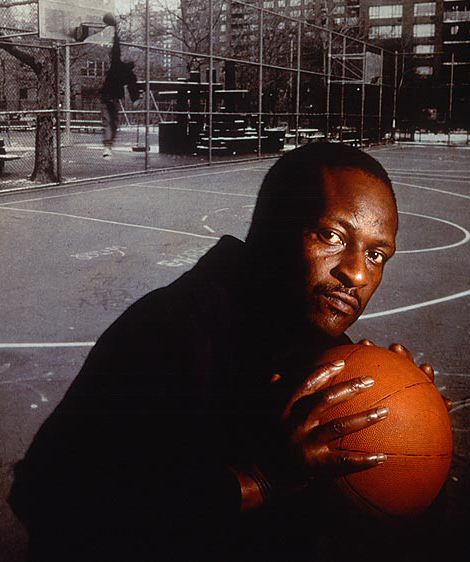
- Manigault at the Goat Park in 1989

Personal information
- Born: September 7, 1944 Charleston, South Carolina, U.S.
- Died: May 15, 1998 (aged 53) New York City, New York, U.S.
- Listed height: 6 ft 1 in (1.85 m)
- Listed weight: 175 lb (79 kg)

Career information
- High school: Benjamin Franklin (Manhattan, New York); Laurinburg Institute (Laurinburg, North Carolina)
- College: Johnson C. Smith (1964)
- Position: Guard

Earl Manigault (September 7, 1944 – May 15, 1998) was an American street basketball player who was nicknamed "the Goat" or "the Lip". He is widely regarded as one of the greatest basketball players never to have played in the National Basketball Association (NBA). He was named in ESPN's "Elite 24: Rucker Park legends".

== Early life ==
Earl Manigault was born in Charleston, South Carolina, and raised in Harlem, New York. He grew up playing basketball and practiced constantly. With per game averages of 24 points and 11 rebounds, Manigault starred at Benjamin Franklin High School, a basketball powerhouse in the Public Schools Athletic League. Manigault set the NYC junior high school record by scoring 57 points in a game in the late 1950s. While attending high school, Manigault's life took a fateful turn when he began associating with groups that would eventually lead to his expulsion. He started using drugs and skipping classes. He was the star of his high school team and seemed destined for greatness in the NBA. Manigault was expelled from school for smoking marijuana. He finished high school at a private academy, Laurinburg Institute, in North Carolina. In one year there, he averaged 31 points and 13 rebounds per game.

Manigault enrolled in Johnson C. Smith University but left after one semester due to his constant problems with school and continuous quibbles with the coach. The nickname "Goat" has several proposed origins. In an article for The New York Times, Manigault stated that he got the nickname because a junior high school teacher kept pronouncing his name Mani-Goat. Other theories state that by the time Manigault was in high school, he was known as "The Goat" because of his quiet demeanor. Another states that the nickname started by confusion over Manigault's last name; people thought Manigault referred to himself as Earl Nanny Goat, so he became "The Goat". The most popular belief is that he was called The Goat as the acronym for Greatest of All Time. Although it is unclear how the name was dubbed, Greatest of All Time is the idea that lasted. The "Happy Warrior Playground", situated on Amsterdam at West 99th Street in Manhattan, is more commonly referred to as "Goat Park" where Manigault reigned. He was mentored by Holcombe Rucker.

== Career and legends ==
Manigault was particularly famous for his leaping abilities on the basketball court. Much of his legend is unsupported playground myth, including his signature move: the double dunk. He allegedly would dunk the ball, catch it with his left hand, switch the ball to his right hand, bring it back around to the top of the basket and jam it through again, all done while still in the air on a single jump, and without hanging on the rim. This is a story repeatedly told but unconfirmed. It was refuted by Manigault himself in a CNN interview available on YouTube when he called the reports of this feat rubbish, stating not even The Goat could do that. Like other street basketballers of the day such as Jackie Jackson, Manigault was reportedly able to touch the top of the backboard to retrieve quarters and dollar bills, part of "elaborate innovations and tricks" elite street players of the era performed before games to help build their reputations.

Like the dunking myth, it is always referred to as "reportedly" without a credible source to support it. It is refuted in Todd Gallagher's book Andy Roddick Beat Me With a Frying Pan. The book dedicates an entire chapter to this myth concluding it was never done by Manigault or anyone else, including NBA stars. Gallagher writes: "Earl 'The Goat' Manigault is widely regarded as one of the greatest playground basketball players of all time. ... There are a number of tales regarding Manigault's prowess, but the central story that propelled his legend was that he had such extraordinary leaping ability he could pull dollar bills off the top of the backboard and leave change. What made this even more amazing was that Manigault was, depending on who you talk to, somewhere between 5-11 and 6-1. Considering that the top of the backboard is at thirteen feet and the average six-foot-tall man can only touch about eight feet high standing flat-footed, Manigault would have had to jump at least sixty inches to even come close." He was only 6 feet 1 inch (1.85 m), but attributed his tremendous jumping ability to having in childhood often worn ankle weights during practice. Such efficacy of ankle weights is doubtful. He once reverse dunked 36 times in a row to win a $60 bet.

To prove dunking was not his only skill, he would practice hundreds of shots each day, making him an expert long-range shooter as well. Manigault played with some of the best players of his day, such as Earl Monroe, Connie Hawkins, and Kareem Abdul-Jabbar. He is featured in the 2012 documentary film Doin' It in the Park about New York City street basketball.

== Later years ==
Manigault returned to Harlem and developed a heroin addiction. He served sixteen months in prison in 1969 and 1970 for drug possession. While incarcerated, Manigault was a subject in Pete Axthelm's book The City Game, which came to the attention of Utah Stars owner Bill Daniels.

After he was released in 1970 at age 25, he hung on the Upper West Side, in and near the projects known as the Frederick Douglass Houses, often with close friends who enjoyed his humor and friendship, such as Sleepy Thomas, L. Byrd, and many others. Later, he tried out for the Utah Stars of the American Basketball Association but did not make the team and never played professionally. After shunning an offer from the Harlem Globetrotters, Manigault started the Goat Tournament, a summer tourney that would feature NBA stars such as Bernard King and Mario Elie. His drug habit reappeared, and he served another term of two years from 1977 to 1979 for a failed robbery attempt so he could buy heroin. After this prison term in the Bronx House of Detention and Sing Sing, Manigault quit heroin and moved to Charleston with his two youngest sons, far away from New York City and the temptation of drugs. In 1980, Manigault returned to New York and brought back the Goat Tournament. Never married, he started the "Walk Away From Drugs" tournament for kids in Harlem to prevent them from making the same mistakes he had made. Much of his later years were dedicated to working with kids on the court. Manigault made a living by painting houses, mowing lawns, and working for the local recreation department. By the late 1980s, he was almost destitute, became frail, and suffered from serious heart problems. In February 1987, he had to have two heart operations. He became a counselor and coach at East Harlem's La Guardia Memorial House, working for New York's Supportive Children's Advocacy Network.

In 1989, Manigault is quoted in the New York Times article "A Fallen King Revisits His Realm" as saying: "For every Michael Jordan, there's an Earl Manigault. We all can't make it. Somebody has to fall. I was the one."

== Death ==
Manigault died from congestive heart failure in 1998 at the age of 53 at Bellevue Hospital in New York City. He twice underwent heart surgery, including surgery on two valves in 1989. Manigault entered the hospital two weeks before his death with heart complications. Doctors said for years that he needed a heart transplant; he had been rejected once because his health was so bad he was considered a poor candidate. In an interview a year prior to his death, Manigault said: "I need a heart transplant. All of my doctors are telling me that my heart is very weak, and it is all attributed to drugs."

== Legacy ==
Manigault was called the greatest player never to make it to the NBA. In a The New York Times article, Kareem Abdul-Jabbar referred to Manigault as "the best basketball player his size in the history of New York City". His domination of the players at the 98th Street courts was so total that it became known as "Goat Park". His high-flying antics were credited with changing the game, paving the way for players including Julius Erving and Michael Jordan.

Although he never played in the NBA and only briefly played in college, the legend of Manigault has spread far and wide and led to his play being glorified in magazines, books, and movies. In 1996, HBO aired a TV movie about Manigault's life entitled Rebound: The Legend of Earl "The Goat" Manigault, starring Don Cheadle in the title role.

== See also ==
- List of people from Harlem
