= Bob McCullough (basketball) =

American basketball player

Robert McCullough is a former basketball player from New York. He was widely known as a streetball player at Rucker Park. McCullough and Fred Crawford started the Rucker Pro Tournament in honor of mentor Holcombe Rucker.

== Basketball ==
McCullough attended Benedict College in South Carolina with Ernie Morris. In college, he averaged 36 points per game. This made him the second-highest scorer in the nation. He scored 2100 points in 3 years.

In the 1965 NBA draft, the Cincinnati Royals took him in the 12th round (91st overall). He was cut to make room for Oscar Robertson.

== Post-basketball career ==
McCullough later went on to earn further degrees and become a New York City guidance counselor and social worker. He studied for a Master of Science degree from Lehman College and studied additionally at New York University, Cornell University, and Hunter College. He serves as a staff member for Rucker Park. He founded a program called Each One Teach One, which was honored by Charles Rangel.
