= Rebound: The Legend of Earl "The Goat" Manigault =

- Television release poster
- Genre: Biography; Sports drama
- Written by: Alan Swyer; Larry Golin
- Directed by: Eriq La Salle
- Starring: Don Cheadle; James Earl Jones; Michael Beach; Loretta Devine; Clarence Williams III; Eriq La Salle; Forest Whitaker
- Music by: Kevin Eubanks
- Country of origin: United States
- Original language: English

Production
- Executive producers: D. J. Caruso; Mark Bakshi; Rick Singer; John Badham
- Producer: David Coatsworth
- Cinematography: Alar Kivilo
- Editor: Gary Karr
- Running time: 111 minutes
- Production companies: HBO Pictures; Way Out Pictures; The Badham Company

Original release
- Network: HBO
- Release: November 23, 1996

Rebound: The Legend of Earl "The Goat" Manigault is a 1996 American biographical sports drama television film about Earl Manigault, a legendary American street basketball player famous under his nickname of "The Goat."

The film was directed by Eriq La Salle, written by Alan Swyer and Larry Golin, and stars Don Cheadle as Manigault. James Earl Jones, Michael Beach, Loretta Devine, Clarence Williams III, La Salle, and Forest Whitaker also star. Former professional basketball player Nigel Miguel provided basketball training to the cast, and worked with La Salle to coordinate and stage the basketball scenes. The film aired on HBO on November 23, 1996.

== Cast ==
- Don Cheadle as Earl Manigault
- James Earl Jones as Dr. McDuffie
- Michael Beach as Legrand
- Clarence Williams III as Coach Pratt
- Eriq La Salle as Diego
- Forest Whitaker as Mr. Rucker
- Ronny Cox as Coach Scarpelli
- Loretta Devine as Miss Mary
- Glynn Turman as Coach Powell
- Monica Calhoun as Evonne
- Colin Cheadle as Young Earl
- Michael Ralph as Dion
- Daryl Mitchell as Dean Meminger
- Nicole Ari Parker as Wanda
- Tamara Tunie as Miss Marcus
- Kareem Abdul-Jabbar as Himself
- Chick Hearn as Himself
- Cress Williams as Kimbrough
- Kevin Garnett as Wilt Chamberlain
- Gary Maloncon as Nate Bowman
- Nigel Miguel as Sonny Johnson
- Olamide Faison as Rookie

== See also ==
- List of basketball films
