= Ken Hutchinson =

Ken Hutchinson may refer to:

== People ==
- Ken Hutchinson (actor) in The World Cup: A Captain's Tale
- Kenny Hutchinson, American basketball player

== Fictional characters ==
- Ken Hutchinson, character in Starsky & Hutch
- Ken Hutchinson, character in Revolution (TV series)

== See also ==
- Ken Hutchison, actor
- Ken Hutcherson, American football player
