= 1985 WAC men's basketball tournament =

- Classification: Division I
- Season: 1984–85
- Teams: 9
- Site: Special Events Center; El Paso, TX
- Champions: San Diego State (1st title)
- Winning coach: Smokey Gaines (1st title)
- MVP: Luster Goodwin (UTEP)
- Television: Lorimar Sports Network

1984–85 WAC men's basketball standings
	Conf.				Overall
Team	W		L	PCT	W		L	PCT
UTEP	12	–	4	.750	22	–	10	.688
San Diego State †	11	–	5	.688	23	–	8	.742
New Mexico	9	–	7	.563	19	–	13	.594
Colorado State	9	–	7	.563	18	–	12	.600
BYU	9	–	7	.563	15	–	14	.517
Utah	8	–	8	.500	15	–	16	.484
Wyoming	7	–	9	.438	15	–	14	.517
Hawaii	5	–	11	.313	10	–	18	.357
Air Force	2	–	14	.125	8	–	20	.286
† 1985 WAC tournament winner Rankings from AP Poll

The 1985 Western Athletic Conference men's basketball tournament was held March 4–7 at the Special Events Center in El Paso, Texas.

In their first season in the WAC, San Diego State defeated defending champions UTEP in the championship game, 87–81, to clinch their first WAC men's tournament championship.

The Aztecs, in turn, received an automatic bid to the 1985 NCAA tournament while top-seeded UTEP additionally received an at-large bid.

== Format ==
The top two teams from the regular season standings continued to receive a double-bye while the third-seeded team got a single-bye. The remaining six teams, in turn, competed in the first round. Seeding was based on regular season conference records.

== Bracket ==
First round Monday, March 4
4	BYU	79
9	Air Force	82
6	Utah	61
7	Wyoming	60
5	Colorado State	73
8	Hawaii	68

Quarterfinals; Tuesday, March 5
9	Air Force	64
6	Utah	66
3	New Mexico	62
5	Colorado State	56

Semifinals; Wednesday, March 6
1	UTEP	82
6	Utah	73
2	San Diego State	98
3	New Mexico	84

Championship; Thursday, March 7
1	UTEP	81
2	San Diego State	87
