= 1985 Pacific Coast Athletic Association men's basketball tournament =

- Classification: Division I
- Season: 1984–85
- Teams: 8
- Site: The Forum; Inglewood, CA
- Champions: UNLV (2nd title)
- Winning coach: Jerry Tarkanian (2nd title)
- MVP: Richie Adams (UNLV)
- Pacific Coast Athletic Association men's basketball tournaments

1984–85 Pacific Coast Athletic Association men's basketball standings
	Conf.				Overall
Team	W		L	PCT	W		L	PCT
No. 9 UNLV†	17	–	1	.944	28	–	4	.875
Fresno State	15	–	3	.833	23	–	9	.719
Cal State Fullerton	11	–	7	.611	17	–	13	.567
Utah State	10	–	8	.556	17	–	11	.607
San Jose State	10	–	8	.556	16	–	13	.552
UC Irvine	8	–	10	.444	12	–	16	.429
UC Santa Barbara	8	–	10	.444	12	–	16	.429
Pacific	5	–	13	.278	9	–	19	.321
New Mexico State	4	–	14	.222	7	–	20	.259
Long Beach State	2	–	16	.111	4	–	23	.148
† 1985 PCAA tournament winner

The 1985 Pacific Coast Athletic Association men's basketball tournament (now known as the Big West Conference men's basketball tournament) was held March 5–7 at The Forum in Inglewood, California.

Top-seeded UNLV defeated Cal State Fullerton in the final, 79–61, thus capturing their second PCAA/Big West title (and second in three seasons).

The Runnin' Rebels, in turn, received a bid to the 1985 NCAA tournament, the program's sixth overall.

== Format ==
The tournament field remained the same as 1984, with eight total teams. Again, only the top eight teams, out of ten, from the regular season standings qualified for the tournament.

All eight participating teams were placed into the first round, with teams seeded and paired based on regular-season records. After the first round, teams were re-seeded so the highest-remaining team was paired with the lowest-remaining time in one semifinal with the other two teams slotted into the other semifinal.

== Bracket ==
First round Thursday, March 5
1	11 UNLV	89
8	Pacific	58
5	San José State	92
4	Utah State	56
(Pairings are reseeded after the first round)
3	Cal State Fullerton	79
6	UC Irvine	68
7	UC Santa Barbara	50
2	Fresno State	56

Semifinals; Friday, March 6
1	11 UNLV	60
5	San José State	59
3	Cal State Fullerton	56
2	Fresno State	54

Championship; Saturday, March 7
1	11 UNLV	79
3	Cal State Fullerton	61
