= 1984–85 UTEP Miners men's basketball team =

American college basketball season

1984–85 UTEP Miners men's basketball

WAC regular season champions

NCAA tournament, Second Round
- Conference: Western Athletic Conference
- Record: 22–10 (12–4 WAC)
- Head coach: Don Haskins (24th season)
- Assistant coaches: Tim Floyd; Jim Forbes; Rus Bradburd
- Home arena: Special Events Center

1984–85 WAC men's basketball standings
| | Conf. | | | | Overall |
| Team | W | | L | PCT | W | | L | PCT |
|---|---|---|---|---|---|---|---|---|
| UTEP | 12 | – | 4 | .750 | 22 | – | 10 | .688 |
| San Diego State † | 11 | – | 5 | .688 | 23 | – | 8 | .742 |
| New Mexico | 9 | – | 7 | .563 | 19 | – | 13 | .594 |
| Colorado State | 9 | – | 7 | .563 | 18 | – | 12 | .600 |
| BYU | 9 | – | 7 | .563 | 15 | – | 14 | .517 |
| Utah | 8 | – | 8 | .500 | 15 | – | 16 | .484 |
| Wyoming | 7 | – | 9 | .438 | 15 | – | 14 | .517 |
| Hawaii | 5 | – | 11 | .313 | 10 | – | 18 | .357 |
| Air Force | 2 | – | 14 | .125 | 8 | – | 20 | .286 |
† 1985 WAC tournament winner Rankings from AP Poll

The 1984–85 UTEP Miners men's basketball team represented the University of Texas at El Paso as a member of the Western Athletic Conference during the 1984–85 college basketball season. The team was led by head coach Don Haskins. The Miners finished 22–10 (12–4 in WAC), lost in the finals of the conference tournament, and received an at-large bid to the NCAA tournament. As No. 11 seed in the West region, the Miners knocked off No. 6 seed Tulsa in the opening round before losing to NC State in the round of 32.

== Roster ==
1984–85 UTEP Miners men's basketball team
Players
Coaches

| Pos. | # | Name | Height | Weight | Year | Hometown |
|---|---|---|---|---|---|---|
| G | 10 | Luster Goodwin | 6 ft 1 in (1.85 m) | — | Sr |
| C | 33 | Dave Feitl | 6 ft 11 in (2.11 m) | 230 lb (104 kg) | Jr | Tucson, Arizona |
| G/F | | Kent Lockhart | 6 ft 4 in (1.93 m) | 190 lb (86 kg) | Sr | Palo Alto, California |

Head coach

- Don Haskins

Assistant coach(es)

Legend

- (C) Team captain
- (S) Suspended
- (I) Ineligible
- (W) Walk-on
- Injured
- Current redshirt

== Schedule and results ==
| Date time, TV | Rank^{#} | Opponent^{#} | Result | Record | Site city, state |
Non-conference Regular Season
| Nov 23, 1984* | | Fort Lewis | W 75–59 | 1–0 | Special Events Center (10,941); El Paso, Texas |
| Nov 27, 1984* | | at New Mexico State | L 63–66 | 1–1 | Pan American Center (13,027); Las Cruces, New Mexico |
| Dec 3, 1984* | | Arizona State | W 68–57 | 2–1 | Special Events Center (10,941); El Paso, Texas |
| Dec 7, 1984* | | vs. Western Illinois | W 83–49 | 3–1 | SIU Arena (2,000); Carbondale, Illinois |
| Dec 8, 1984* | | at Southern Illinois | W 77–75 | 4–1 | SIU Arena (8,000); Carbondale, Illinois |
| Dec 11, 1984* | | New Mexico State | W 83–62 | 5–1 | Special Events Center (12,222); El Paso, Texas |
| Dec 15, 1984* | | Lamar | W 69–62 | 6–1 | Special Events Center (10,822); El Paso, Texas |
| Dec 22, 1984* | | Texas Southern | L 62–63 | 6–2 | Special Events Center (9,727); El Paso, Texas |
| Dec 28, 1984* | | Wake Forest; Sun Bowl Classic | W 90–75 | 7–2 | Special Events Center (10,761); El Paso, Texas |
| Dec 29, 1984* | | Purdue; Sun Bowl Classic | L 64–74 | 7–3 | Special Events Center (11,497); El Paso, Texas |
| Dec 31, 1984* | | Southern | L 75–84 | 7–4 | Special Events Center (8,200); El Paso, Texas |
WAC Regular Season
| Jan 3, 1985 | | at BYU | L 60–62 | 7–5 (0–1) | Marriott Center (10,902); Provo, Utah |
| Jan 5, 1985 | | at Utah | W 78–67 | 8–5 (1–1) | Jon M. Huntsman Center (11,691); Salt Lake City, Utah |
| Jan 7, 1985* | | Baptist College | W 66–47 | 9–5 | Special Events Center (8,510); El Paso, Texas |
| Jan 10, 1985 | | Air Force | W 67–56 | 10–5 (2–1) | Special Events Center (10,902); El Paso, Texas |
| Jan 12, 1985* | | Wyoming | W 77–59 | 11–5 (3–1) | Special Events Center (5,327); El Paso, Texas |
| Jan 18, 1985 | | Hawaii | W 85–66 | 12–5 (4–1) | Special Events Center (11,552); El Paso, Texas |
| Jan 19, 1985 | | San Diego State | W 87–81 | 13–5 (5–1) | Special Events Center (12,222); El Paso, Texas |
| Jan 24, 1985 | | Colorado State | W 79–45 | 14–5 (6–1) | Special Events Center (11,576); El Paso, Texas |
| Jan 26, 1985 | | New Mexico | W 71–69 | 15–5 (7–1) | Special Events Center (12,222); El Paso, Texas |
| Feb 28, 1985 | | at Wyoming | L 62–65 | 15–6 (7–2) | Arena-Auditorium (7,488); Laramie, Wyoming |
| Feb 2, 1985 | | at Air Force | W 64–53 | 16–6 (8–2) | Clune Arena (2,000); Colorado Springs, Colorado |
| Feb 7, 1985 | | Utah | W 68–56 | 17–6 (9–2) | Special Events Center (12,222); El Paso, Texas |
| Feb 9, 1985 | | Brigham Young | W 97–86 | 18–6 (10–2) | Special Events Center (12,222); El Paso, Texas |
| Feb 14, 1985 | | at San Diego State | W 71–69 | 18–7 (10–3) | San Diego Sports Arena (8,843); San Diego, California |
| Feb 16, 1985 | | Hawaii | W 65–63 | 19–7 (11–3) | Neal S. Blaisdell Center (3,129); Honolulu, Hawaii |
| Feb 23, 1985 | | at New Mexico | W 79–65 | 20–7 (12–3) | University Arena (18,056); Albuquerque, New Mexico |
| Mar 2, 1985 | | at Colorado State | L 69–73 | 20–8 (12–4) | Moby Arena (7,802); Fort Collins, Colorado |
WAC tournament
| Mar 6, 1985* | (1) | (6) Utah; Semifinals | W 82–73 ^{OT} | 21–8 | Special Events Center (11,551); El Paso, Texas |
| Mar 7, 1985* | (1) | (2) San Diego State; Finals | L 81–87 | 21–9 | Special Events Center (11,728); El Paso, Texas |
NCAA tournament
| Mar 15, 1985* | (11 W) | vs. (6 W) No. 18 Tulsa; First round | W 79–75 | 22–9 | University Arena (12,256); Albuquerque, New Mexico |
| Mar 17, 1985* | (11 W) | vs. (3 W) No. 16 NC State; Second round | L 73–86 | 22–10 | University Arena (13,833); Albuquerque, New Mexico |
*Non-conference game. ^{#}Rankings from AP Poll. (#) Tournament seedings in parentheses. W=West.
