= Gary Springer =

American basketball player (born 1962)

Personal information
- Born: February 18, 1962 (age 64) New York City, New York, U.S.
- Listed height: 6 ft 7 in (2.01 m)
- Listed weight: 220 lb (100 kg)

Career information
- High school: Benjamin Franklin (Harlem, New York)
- College: Iona (1980–1984)
- NBA draft: 1984: 6th round, 137th overall pick
- Drafted by: Philadelphia 76ers
- Position: Power forward

Career history
- 1984–1985: Puerto Rico Coquis

Career highlights
- 2× First-team All-MAAC (1982, 1983); Second-team All-MAAC (1984); Haggerty Award (1981); First-team Parade All-American (1980); McDonald's All-American (1980)
- Stats at Basketball Reference

Gary Springer Sr. (born February 18, 1962) is an American former professional basketball player who is best known for his collegiate career at Iona between 1980–81 and 1983–84.

== Early life ==
Springer grew up in Harlem, New York and attended Benjamin Franklin High School (BFHS). He played on a dominant basketball team with the likes of Richie Adams, Kenny Hutchinson and Lonnie Green, all of whom were jointly credited with making BFHS the country's top-ranked team in the fall of 1979. Walter Berry then joined the team one year later, making it possibly one of the greatest New York City high school teams of all time.

== College career ==
After high school, Springer played basketball for the Iona Gaels. Springer went on to earn varsity letters all four years at the school and graduated as one of its most lauded players. He compiled 1,866 points and 1,021 rebounds in his 121-game career. Additionally, Springer was a three-time honorable mention All-American, a three-time All-Metro Atlantic Athletic Conference selection, a four-time All-Metropolitan Area choice, and as a freshman in 1980–81 he was the Haggerty Award winner. The annual award is bestowed upon the New York City metropolitan area's most outstanding men's college basketball player.

During one week in his freshman season, he recorded totals of 58 points, 23 rebounds, and made two game-winning shots. His first shot was a buzzer-beater to defeat Wagner, 82–80, followed by a 20-foot shot with six seconds remaining to defeat Holy Cross, 57–56. For his efforts, Sports Illustrated named him their national player of the week.

The Gaels also reached the postseason three out of his four seasons. They reached the first round in the 1982 NIT, the second round in the 1983 NIT, and the round of 48 in the 1984 NCAA Tournament.

== Professional career ==
After his collegiate career, Springer was drafted by the NBA's Philadelphia 76ers, but never played in the NBA due to injuries.

Springer played briefly for the Puerto Rico Coquis of the Continental Basketball Association (CBA) during the 1984–85 season.

== Personal life ==
Springer has three sons, Gary Jr., who also later starred at Iona in the mid-2000s, Jordan played at Army in the early 2010s and Jaden, his youngest son, played for Tennessee and was the 28th overall pick in the 2021 NBA Draft by the Philadelphia 76ers. His nephew is NBA player DeAndre' Bembry.
