= 1984–85 San Diego State Aztecs men's basketball team =

American college basketball season

1984–85 San Diego State Aztecs men's basketball

WAC tournament champion

NCAA tournament
- Conference: Western Athletic Conference
- Record: 23–8 (11–5 WAC)
- Head coach: Smokey Gaines (6th season)
- Home arena: San Diego Sports Arena

1984–85 WAC men's basketball standings
	Conf.				Overall
Team	W		L	PCT	W		L	PCT
UTEP	12	–	4	.750	22	–	10	.688
San Diego State †	11	–	5	.688	23	–	8	.742
New Mexico	9	–	7	.563	19	–	13	.594
Colorado State	9	–	7	.563	18	–	12	.600
BYU	9	–	7	.563	15	–	14	.517
Utah	8	–	8	.500	15	–	16	.484
Wyoming	7	–	9	.438	15	–	14	.517
Hawaii	5	–	11	.313	10	–	18	.357
Air Force	2	–	14	.125	8	–	20	.286
† 1985 WAC tournament winner Rankings from AP Poll

The 1984–85 San Diego State Aztecs men's basketball team represented San Diego State University during the 1984–85 NCAA Division I men's basketball season. The Aztecs, led by sixth-year head coach Smokey Gaines, played their home games at the San Diego Sports Arena as members in the Western Athletic Conference.

After finishing a game behind UTEP in the conference regular season standings, San Diego State won the WAC tournament to earn an automatic bid to the NCAA tournament. As No. 13 seed in the West region, the Aztecs were defeated by UNLV in the opening round, 85–80. The team finished with a record of 23–8 (11–5 WAC).

== Roster ==
1984–85 San Diego State Aztecs men's basketball team
Players
Coaches

Pos.	#	Name	Height	Weight	Year	Previous school	Hometown
G	12	Anthony Watson	6 ft 3 in (1.91 m)	170 lb (77 kg)	Jr	Cooley HS	Detroit, Michigan
C		Leonard Allen	6 ft 10 in (2.08 m)	—	Sr

Head coach

- Smokey Gaines (LeMoyne–Owen)

Assistant coach(es)

Legend

- (C) Team captain
- (S) Suspended
- (I) Ineligible
- (W) Walk-on
- Injured
- Current redshirt

Roster

== Schedule and results ==
Date time, TV	Rank^{#}	Opponent^{#}	Result	Record	Site (attendance) city, state
Regular season
Nov 29, 1984*		at UC Irvine	W 86–77	1–0	Crawford Hall; Irvine, California
Dec 1, 1984*		Morgan State	W 128–68	2–0	San Diego Sports Arena; San Diego, California
Dec 6, 1984*		San Diego	W 57–53	3–0	San Diego Sports Arena; San Diego, California
Dec 11, 1984*		UC Santa Barbara	W 84–69	4–0	San Diego Sports Arena; San Diego, California
Dec 15, 1984*		at Long Beach State	W 62–60	5–0	Long Beach Arena; Long Beach, California
Dec 20, 1984*		vs. McNeese State	W 91–85	6–0	
Dec 21, 1984*		vs. Southwestern Louisiana	W 86–73	7–0	
Dec 22, 1984*		Texas	W 71–65	8–0	San Diego Sports Arena; San Diego, California
Dec 28, 1984*		TCU; Cabrillo Classic	L 70–72	8–1	San Diego Sports Arena; San Diego, California
Dec 29, 1984*		Michigan State; Cabrillo Classic	L 61–77	8–2	San Diego Sports Arena; San Diego, California
Jan 3, 1985*		at Wyoming	W 60–57	9–2	Arena-Auditorium; Laramie, Wyoming
Jan 5, 1985		at Air Force	W 88–73	10–2 (1–0)	Clune Arena; Colorado Springs, Colorado
Jan 10, 1985		Utah	W 76–67	11–2 (2–0)	San Diego Sports Arena; San Diego, California
Jan 12, 1985		BYU	W 89–70	12–2 (3–0)	San Diego Sports Arena; San Diego, California
Jan 18, 1985		at New Mexico	L 85–94	12–3 (3–1)	University Arena; Albuquerque, New Mexico
Jan 19, 1985		at UTEP	L 81–87	12–4 (3–2)	Special Events Center; El Paso, Texas
Jan 22, 1985*		U.S. International	W 112–74	13–4	San Diego Sports Arena; San Diego, California
Jan 24, 1985		at Hawaii	W 70–66	14–4 (4–2)	Neal S. Blaisdell Center; Honolulu, Hawaii
Jan 28, 1985		Air Force	W 74–64	15–4 (5–2)	San Diego Sports Arena; San Diego, California
Feb 23, 1985		at Colorado State	L 72–78	21–7 (11–5)	Moby Arena; Fort Collins, Colorado
WAC tournament
Mar 6, 1985*	(2)	vs. (3) New Mexico; Semifinals	W 98–84	22–7	Special Events Center; El Paso, Texas
Mar 7, 1985*	(2)	at (1) UTEP; Championship game	W 87–81	23–7	Special Events Center (11,728); El Paso, Texas
NCAA tournament
Mar 14, 1985*	(13 W)	vs. (4 W) No. 9 UNLV; First round	L 80–85	23–8	Jon M. Huntsman Center; Salt Lake City, Utah
*Non-conference game. ^{#}Rankings from AP Poll. (#) Tournament seedings in parentheses. W=West. All times are in Pacific Time.
