= Smokey Gaines =

American basketball player and coach (1940–2020)

Personal information
- Born: February 27, 1940 Detroit, Michigan, U.S.
- Died: September 5, 2020 (aged 80) Memphis, Tennessee, U.S.
- Listed height: 6 ft 1 in (1.85 m)
- Listed weight: 170 lb (77 kg)

Career information
- High school: Northeastern (Detroit, Michigan)
- College: LeMoyne–Owen (1959–1963)
- NBA draft: 1963: undrafted
- Position: Shooting guard
- Number: 32

Career history

Playing
- 1967: Kentucky Colonels

Coaching
- 1973–1977: Detroit (assistant)
- 1977–1979: Detroit
- 1979–1987: San Diego State

Career highlights
- As player: No. 32 retired by LeMoyne–Owen Magicians; As coach: WAC tournament champion (1985); WAC Coach of the Year (1985)
- Stats at Basketball Reference

David "Smokey" Gaines (February 27, 1940 (Note: Sources conflict on Gaines' birth year. His obituary has 1942 but a post by his family uses 1940.) – September 5, 2020) was an American basketball player and coach.

== Playing career ==
He played professionally for three games for the Kentucky Colonels during the 1967–68 American Basketball Association season after a four-year stint with the Harlem Globetrotters. Gaines attended LeMoyne-Owen College from 1959 to 1963 where he was the first player to have his number retired.

== Coaching career ==
After his playing days Gaines became a men's college basketball coach, serving as head coach for the Detroit Mercy and San Diego State Aztecs. He replaced Dick Vitale at the former school, and coached Michael Cage and future Baseball Hall-of-Famer Tony Gwynn at the latter. He compiled a 112–117 record in eight seasons at San Diego State University (SDSU) and became the first black head coach in NCAA Division I in California. He was named the coach of the year of the Western Athletic Conference in 1984–85, when the Aztecs went 24–8 and qualified for the NCAA tournament. Gaines was named athletic director for the Memphis City Schools in 2008, after coaching and serving as the athletic director at LeMoyne-Owen.

== Death ==
Gaines died on September 5, 2020, from cancer. He had also contracted COVID-19 in the time leading up to his death.

== Career statistics ==
Legend
GP	Games played	GS	Games started	MPG	Minutes per game
FG%	Field goal percentage	3P%	3-point field goal percentage	FT%	Free throw percentage
RPG	Rebounds per game	APG	Assists per game	SPG	Steals per game
BPG	Blocks per game	PPG	Points per game	**Bold**	Career high

=== ABA ===
==== Regular season ====
Year	Team	GP	MPG	FG%	3P%	FT%	RPG	APG	PPG
1967–68	Kentucky	3	12.0	.250	1.000	.500	3.3	.0	3.3

== Head coaching record ==
Record table
Season	Team	Overall	Conference	Standing	Postseason
**Detroit Titans** (Independent) (1977–1979)
1977–78	Detroit	25–4			NIT Quarterfinals
1978–79	Detroit	22–6			NCAA Division I First Round
Detroit:		47–10 (.825)			
**San Diego State Aztecs** (Western Athletic Conference) (1979–1987)
1979–80	San Diego State	6–21	3–11	T–7th	
1980–81	San Diego State	15–12	8–8	5th	
1981–82	San Diego State	20–9	11–5	2nd	NIT First Round
1982–83	San Diego State	18–10	8–8	T–5th	
1983–84	San Diego State	15–13	6–10	T–6th	
1984–85	San Diego State	23–8	11–5	2nd	NCAA Division I First Round
1985–86	San Diego State	10–19	7–9	6th	
1986–87	San Diego State	5–25	2–14	T–8th	
San Diego State:		112–117 (.489)	56–70 (.444)		
Total:		159–127 (.556)			
National champion Postseason invitational champion Conference regular season champion Conference regular season and conference tournament champion Division regular season champion Division regular season and conference tournament champion Conference tournament champion
