= Leonard Covello =

American teacher

Leonard Covello (November 26, 1887 – August 19, 1982) was an Italian-born American educator, most known as the founder and first principal of the Benjamin Franklin High School and for his work on behalf of the children of Italian and Puerto Rican immigrants.

== Biography ==
Leonard Covello was born in 1887 at Avigliano, in the Basilicata region of southern Italy.

In 1890 his father, Pietro Covello, immigrated to the United States, leaving his wife and three children. Six years later, in 1896, the family was able to reunite in East Harlem, New York. Mary Elizabeth Brown, "Leonard Covello".

In school in America, he was called Leonard and won a Pulitzer scholarship in high school that enabled him to attend Columbia University from 1907 to 1911 and graduate.

In 1913 he was hired as a teacher of French and Spanish at DeWitt Clinton High School.

With the entrance of the United States into World War I in 1917, Covello went to France where, because of his knowledge of the French language, he was assigned to duties as an interpreter and became a member of the Corps of Intelligence Police, conducting covert intelligence operations in Spain.

In 1920 Covello returned to his former position at DeWitt Clinton High School. Here he deepened his pedagogical ideas on the integration of young Italian-Americans. Covello challenged the practices that tended to separate the children from their culture and language, including their families and their communities of origin, as a prerequisite for their success in studies. As he recollected in his autobiography: "throughout my whole elementary school career, I do not recall one mention of Italy or the Italian language or what famous Italians there were in the world, with the possible exception of Columbus…. We soon got the idea that 'Italian' meant something inferior, and a barrier was erected between children of Italian origin and their parents…. We were becoming Americans by learning how to be ashamed of our parents." In bilingualism and biculturalism Covello saw the means to facilitate the transition of children from immigrants to integrated citizens, without separating them from their communities or native culture, but on the contrary, instilling in them the pride of their roots. For this purpose he founded "Il Circolo italiano" (The Italian Circle) at DeWitt Clinton in 1914.

In 1922, he created the Department of Italian at DeWitt Clinton, which he directed until 1926, when he was promoted to First Assistant in Modern Languages, a position he held until 1934. At DeWitt Clinton, he served as a mentor to future congressman Vito Marcantonio.

In 1934, the founding of Benjamin Franklin High School fulfilled his dream of creating in the East Harlem neighborhood a school organized around his educational theories. Covello was not only the principal and leader of the school, but carried out intensive work as lecturer in order to disseminate his pedagogical theories. From 1929 to 1942 he was adjunct professor at New York University, from which he received his Ph.D. in education in 1944.

When in the 1940s the neighborhood of East Harlem became increasingly Puerto Rican, Covello fought in favor of racial integration and applied to the Puerto Rican community the same principles he had tested in the 1920s and 1930s with the children of Italian immigrants. After a Sept 29, 1945, riot between black and white students, he successfully worked to calm tensions. At the invitation of Covello, Frank Sinatra visited the school, spoke about ethnic tolerance and sang Aren't You Glad You're You? as a sign of reconciliation.

In 1956 Covello retired from his role of principal of Franklin High School and accepted an appointment as an educational consultant of the Puerto Rican Migration Division.

In 1962 he worked for the YMCA and in 1964 became director of the East Harlem Youth Career Information Conference.

Covello was a founding member of the American Italian Historical Association (1966).

In 1972, Leonard Covello went to Sicily at the invitation of educator Danilo Dolci to apply his methods of education to disadvantaged children in Sicily.

Covello died August 19, 1982, in Messina, Italy.

== Works of Leonard Covello ==
- The Social Background of the Italo-American School Child (Leiden: Brill, 1967; Totowa, NJ: Rowman and Littlefield, 1972)
- The Heart is the Teacher (New York: McGraw Hill, 1958)

== The Heart is the Teacher ==
The Heart is the Teacher is the 1958 autobiography of the Italian-American educator Leonard Covello, co-written with novelist Guido D'Agostino. The memoir details Covello's life as an Italian immigrant child and later teacher and principal in East Harlem, New York. It also offers Covello's reflections on the importance of schools and the community in the development of children in immigrant neighborhoods.

=== Purpose for Writing ===
Covello wrote The Heart is the Teacher as a reflection on his life as an Italian immigrant growing up in America and his experiences over forty-five years as a teacher of immigrant children. In the opening paragraphs of his memoir, he comments on his career in education: "I have learned much about the ways of immigrant peoples and their American-born children. I was an immigrant boy myself. I know what the American school can do to maintain family unity. I also know how the school can function as the integrating force in our democracy and in the molding of young citizens." As an educator and community leader, he was a firm believer in the power of the school in shaping neighborhoods and the lives of new immigrants to the United States.

=== Summary ===
==== Experiences as an Immigrant Child ====
In the first half of The Heart is the and the dason Teacher, Covello recounts his life as a young Italian immigrant. He comments on his life growing up in Italy, waiting with uncertainty for his father to raise the money to bring the family to America. Once in New York, he describes the poverty that was a constant burden to immigrant families as they struggled to survive in tenement apartments in East Harlem.

Covello's reflections on his teenage years draw attention to the challenges immigrant children faced embracing American culture in public while maintaining traditional Italian practices at home. He comments on his "fear of ridicule" in public over his foreign heritage and his efforts to maintain "separate watertight compartments" between his home and school lives. These tensions were most apparent in Covello's tortured relationship with the school, as he frequently considered dropping out (which he did temporarily) to support his family. But encouraged by teachers and friends, Covello applied for and won a Pulitzer scholarship to study at Columbia. Covello notes that it was in college that he began to embrace his Italian heritage. In addition, through teaching night classes in English, he began to develop his passion for teaching.

==== Career as a Teacher ====
In the second half of his memoir, Covello reflects on his career as an educator and community leader in East Harlem. After graduating from Columbia, Covello started teaching languages at DeWitt Clinton High School. As a teacher, he sought to promote the passions of his Italian students by encouraging them to embrace their cultural heritage, forming an Italian Department and an Italian-American cultural club.

When World War I broke out, Covello's teaching career was interrupted by a tour of duty, followed by a stint as an advertising agent. But his love of teaching brought him back to DeWitt Clinton, where he sought to act as both a teacher and mentor to his Italian boys. This included efforts to act as an intermediary between the separate spheres he struggled with as a teenager. As an Italian immigrant himself, he connected with his students and even made home visits to encourage traditional parents to accept their sons' educational aspirations. Outside of the classroom, he helped organize numerous community programs, including night classes in English and American citizenship, as well as an Italian Parent-Teachers Association.

When New York City named Covello the first principal of the new Benjamin Franklin High School in 1934, a position he held for 22 years, he sought to turn the school into a community center for the neighborhood. While stressing the importance of academics, Covello considered neighborhood engagement equally important as a means of encouraging children to stay off the streets while bettering their community. His memoir recounts interactions with many of his students over the years, who affectionately called him "Pop," as well as the countless afterschool and evening programs he helped develop for the community.

In the final chapters of his memoir, Covello comments briefly on his work with Puerto Ricans as the new immigrant group of New York City. He also reflects on the lessons he learned after nearly half a century as an educator. He stresses the importance of teachers and schools as shapers of rising generations of citizens, and in the end, concludes that "the battle for a better world will be won or lost in our schools."

=== Critical Reception of the Book ===
Contemporary reviews of The Heart is the Teacher were positive. A reviewer for The New York Times questioned why a man of Covello's education and experience took on a co-author, but nevertheless called the book "well worth reading." A reviewer for The Modern Language Journal was more praiseworthy, describing Covello as "an idealist with his feet firmly planted on the earth," and lauding the book as "readable, written in a candid, engaging, and moving style."

In 1998, Harvard professor in the School of Education Vito Perrone wrote Teacher with a Heart: Reflections on Leonard Covello and Community as part of the Teachers College Press Series "Between Teacher and Text." In the book, Perrone comments on the legacy Covello left as an educator, and reflects on ways that current teachers can learn from Covello's experiences as a teacher in an immigrant community. The second half of the book offers select passages from The Heart is the Teacher.

In 2013, the autobiography was reprinted in its entirety as part of the John D. Calandra Italian American Institute's "Studies in Italian Americana" series. But he died in 1982 at 98 years old

=== Significance ===
The Heart is the Teacher offers an insightful look into the experiences of Italian immigrants in the first half of the twentieth century. Covello describes in great detail the challenges Italian immigrant families faced. These challenges began in Italy, as wives and children struggled to survive while husbands and fathers traveled to America to earn money to support and transport their families; they continued in America for families who lived in cramped tenements and faced uncertainty in finding enough work to support themselves.

Covello's autobiography is especially valuable for its insights on children. He shares stories not only from his own childhood, but also from those of his students to demonstrate the challenges immigrant children or first generation Americans faced in balancing public and private lives. Like many of his students, Covello had to cope with feelings of being trapped by the views of his traditional Italian parents, whose culture centered on loyalty to the home and working to support the family. Covello's notions of separate spheres, evident not only in his experiences but those of his students, is an important concept for thinking about how immigrant and ethnic children coped with difficulties of embracing American culture without feeling that they were betraying their parents.

The book also reflects Covello's belief that a school should function as a center for community development. He comments in great detail on the centrality of ethnic culture to an immigrant's response to American life, which became the subject of his doctoral work. As an educator he embraced his ethnic heritage and became a firm believer that cultural and community pride could be used to tap into student potential, engaging them in educational and outreach programs to better their community. He also recognizes the importance of bridging the generational gap which he had struggled with as a child by bringing parents into the community and making them an integral part of their children's educations.

The Heart is the Teacher is a valuable resource for thinking about both immigration and education in the United States during the first half of the twentieth century. Covello offers detailed reflections and personal stories about the challenges new waves of immigrants faced coming to the United States in the twentieth century, including supporting families financially and balancing new American cultures with old world traditions. In addition, Covello's stories from his time as a student and teacher demonstrate that while school and community could increase tensions in immigrant families, they could also serve as centers of assimilation.

== Footnotes ==
=== Sources ===
- Michael C. Johanek, Leonard Covello and the Making of Benjamin Franklin High School: Education As If Citizenship Mattered (Temple University Press, 2006).
- Mary Elizabeth Brown, "Leonard Covello". In The Italian American Experience: An Encyclopedia, ed. Salvatore J. LaGumina, et al. (New York: Garland Pub., 2000), pp. 149–50
- Leonard Covello and Guido D'Agostino, The Heart is the Teacher (1958; repr., New York: John D. Calandra Italian American Institute, 2013)
- Meyer Berger, "A Lifetime's Experience," The New York Times, October 19, 1958, p. BR3.
- Hymen Alpern, "Review," The Modern Language Journal, 43.6 (Oct., 1959), p. 303-304.
- Vito Perrone, Teacher with a Heart: Reflections on Leonard Covello and Community (New York: Teachers College Press, 1998)
