= Richie Parker =

American basketball player

Richie Parker is a basketball player from New York City. He began his sport career at Manhattan Center high school in East Harlem and became considered one of the top 50 senior basketball players in the nation. During his time there he committed a sexual assault on a minor and lost scholarship offers from Seton Hall and the University of Utah.

In January 1994, Parker and a schoolmate, Leslie Francis, while attending Manhattan Center, committed a sexual assault on a 16-year-old freshman girl. Parker and Francis were arrested at the scene, and convicted of first-degree sexual abuse in January 1995.

Subsequently, Parker spent one year at a junior college in Arizona, then moved to Long Island University where he graduated in May 2000. He played briefly for the Atlantic City Seagulls and appeared in television commercials. From 2002 Parker worked with the Stay Strong Foundation, which offers mentoring for troubled young people in New York City.
