= Jumpin Jackie Jackson =

American basketball player (1940–2019)

"Jumpin" Jackie Jackson (January 25, 1940 – May 4, 2019) was an American professional basketball player. Jackson was one of the first streetball legends in the Rucker Playground Basketball Tournaments in New York City in the early 1960s. He went on to a 20-year career with the Harlem Globetrotters, earning his nickname by allegedly snatching a quarter from the top of a basketball backboard on a bet. He was named in ESPN's "Elite 24: Rucker Park legends".

== Early life ==
Jackson was born in New Bern, North Carolina, and his family relocated to Brooklyn, New York when he was a child. He played for the Boys High School basketball team alongside baseball player Tommy Davis and future Basketball Hall of Famers Lenny Wilkens and Connie Hawkins.

It was while playing for the Virginia Union University basketball team, however, that Jackson's leaping ability took off. He averaged over 20 rebounds per game and was known for jumping over the defender's head on fast breaks. He was the CIAA freshman of the year in 1958.

During the summertime, he played on the Brooklyn All Star team in the Rucker Park Tournaments, along with his childhood friend Connie Hawkins and New York Knick Walt Bellamy. He built his playground status by dunking over Wilt Chamberlain and also blocking his finger roll in the same game.

== Professional career ==
Jackson was selected number 41 in the 1962 NBA draft, but was personally recruited by Abe Saperstein, owner of the Harlem Globetrotters, to play for his team. He played with the Globetrotters for 20 years with Marques Haynes, Meadowlark Lemon, and Fred "Curly" Neal.

== Recognition ==
Jackson was a member of Boys High Hall of Fame, Virginia Union Hall of Fame, CIAA Hall of Fame, Rucker Tournament Hall of Fame, and Harlem Globetrotters Hall of Fame. Virginia Union also retired his number.

== Sources ==
- Batchelor, Bob. Basketball in America: from the playgrounds to Jordan's game and beyond. NY Halworth. 2005
- Mallozzi, Vincent. Asphalt Gods An Oral History of the Rucker Tournament. USA Doubleday. 2003
- The Original Harlem Globetrotters. Jackie Jackson. 2010
- Virginia Union Panthers Official Athletic Website. Hall of Fame Jackie Jackson Class of 1961. December 19, 2010
- Wolf, David. Foul The Connie Hawkins Story. NY. Holt, Rinehart and Winston. 1972
