= Richie Adams =

American basketball player

Personal information
- Born: March 15, 1963 (age 63)
- Died: February 19th 2026 New York, New York, U.S.
- Listed height: 6 ft 9 in (2.06 m)

Career information
- High school: Benjamin Franklin (Harlem, New York)
- College: UNLV (1981–1985)
- NBA draft: 1985: 4th round, 81st overall pick
- Drafted by: Washington Bullets
- Position: Center

Career highlights
- 2× PCAA Player of the Year (1984, 1985); 2× First-team All-PCAA (1984, 1985)
- Stats at Basketball Reference

Richie Adams (March 15, 1963 - February 19, 2026) was an American former basketball player known for his college basketball career at the University of Nevada, Las Vegas (UNLV) as well as for his manslaughter conviction of a 15-year-old girl later in his life.

== Early life ==
Adams grew up in the Andrew Jackson Housing Projects in the Bronx, New York. At age 13 he discovered his love for basketball after flying to Hawaii to play in a tournament. He enrolled at Benjamin Franklin High School (BFHS) in East Harlem where he would play with future National Basketball Association (NBA) player Walter Berry as well as Gary Springer, Kenny Hutchinson and Lonnie Green, all of whom were jointly credited with making BFHS the country's top-ranked team in the fall of 1979. He played at the Entertainer's Basketball Classic at Rucker Park.

== College career ==
After earning his GED from a Massachusetts junior college, Adams enrolled at UNLV to play for the Jerry Tarkanian-coached Runnin' Rebels basketball team. A 6 ft 9 in (2.06 m) center, he was known as an athletic player with great leaping ability who rose to prominence out of seemingly nowhere. Other than taking one season off during school to deal with family issues back in New York, Adams starred at UNLV. During his career he scored 1,168 points and grabbed 623 rebounds (his rebound total was a school-record at the time). In one game against Utah State, Adams scored 37 points and grabbed 18 rebounds, and it was speculated that during Adams' prime he could out-rebound Dennis Rodman. The 1983–84 and 1984–85 seasons, his junior and senior seasons, respectively, Adams was named the back-to-back Pacific Coast Athletic Association Player of the Year. He averaged 12.7 points and 6.7 rebounds his junior year and 16.1 and 7.9 as a senior.

== Professional career ==
After his collegiate career ended, the Washington Bullets selected him in the fourth round (81st overall) in the 1985 NBA draft. Adams never made the final roster, getting cut in training camp, and his professional career consisted of a short stint in the United States Basketball League as well as a select few games in South America. Adams also had a short stint in the Continental Basketball Association, splitting the 1985–86 season between the Bay State Bombardiers and Baltimore Lightning.

== Legal troubles and murder conviction ==
Adams was never able to escape the street mentality in which he grew up. He was on a self-destructive path throughout college and that continued even after he was drafted by an NBA team; one day after Adams was chosen by the Bullets, he was arrested for car theft in the Bronx. He was charged with holding up a woman in Manhattan, for purse-snatching, and again for another car theft. Adams used drugs heavily (specifically cocaine) and spent most of his earned basketball money on them.

In 1996, Adams was arrested for manslaughter after Norma Rodriguez, a 15-year-old high school girl, was found dead from a violent stomping on October 15 of the same year. Authorities traced Adams to the crime, and two years later he was convicted of manslaughter and given a 25-year jail sentence. He began originally serving his sentence in Rikers Island Prison before getting moved to upstate New York. His sentence was not completed until 2023.
