= 1984–85 UC Irvine Anteaters men's basketball team =

American college basketball season

1984–85 UC Irvine Anteaters men's basketball
- Conference: Pacific Coast Athletic Association
- Record: 13–17 (8–10 PCAA)
- Head coach: Bill Mulligan (5th season)
- Assistant coaches: Mike Bokosky; Mike Scarano
- Home arena: Crawford Hall

1984–85 Pacific Coast Athletic Association men's basketball standings
	Conf.				Overall
Team	W		L	PCT	W		L	PCT
No. 9 UNLV†	17	–	1	.944	28	–	4	.875
Fresno State	15	–	3	.833	23	–	9	.719
Cal State Fullerton	11	–	7	.611	17	–	13	.567
Utah State	10	–	8	.556	17	–	11	.607
San Jose State	10	–	8	.556	16	–	13	.552
UC Irvine	8	–	10	.444	12	–	16	.429
UC Santa Barbara	8	–	10	.444	12	–	16	.429
Pacific	5	–	13	.278	9	–	19	.321
New Mexico State	4	–	14	.222	7	–	20	.259
Long Beach State	2	–	16	.111	4	–	23	.148
† 1985 PCAA tournament winner

The 1984–85 UC Irvine Anteaters men's basketball team represented the University of California, Irvine during the 1984–85 NCAA Division I men's basketball season. The Anteaters were led by fifth year head coach Bill Mulligan and played their home games at the Crawford Hall. They were members of the Pacific Coast Athletic Association. They finished the season 13–17 and 8–10 in PCAA play.

== Previous season ==
The 1983–84 UC Irvine Anteaters men's basketball team returned finished with a record of 19–10 and 14–4 in PCAA play. Senior Forward Ben McDonald received AP Honorable Mention All-American Honors.

== Roster ==
1984–85 UC Irvine Anteaters men's basketball team
Players
Coaches

Pos.	#	Name	Height	Weight	Year	Hometown
F		Anthony Burgess	6 ft 5 in (1.96 m)	—	Fr
F	24	Troy Carmon	6 ft 6 in (1.98 m)	—	Sr	Long Beach, CA
C	35	Rick Ciaccio	6 ft 10 in (2.08 m)	210 lb (95 kg)	Jr	Newport Beach, CA
F	30	Wayne Engelstad	6 ft 8 in (2.03 m)	245 lb (111 kg)	Fr	Rosemead, CA
G		Boris King	6 ft 2 in (1.88 m)	—	Fr
G		Jerome Lee	6 ft 1 in (1.85 m)	—	Sr
F		Dexter Magee	6 ft 7 in (2.01 m)	—	Fr
C	43	Tod Murphy	6 ft 9 in (2.06 m)	220 lb (100 kg)	Jr	Long Beach, CA
F	32	Johnny Rogers	6 ft 10 in (2.08 m)	225 lb (102 kg)	Jr	Fullerton, CA
G		Rodney Scott	6 ft 2 in (1.88 m)	—	Fr
F		Tom Tolbert	6 ft 7 in (2.01 m)	235 lb (107 kg)	Sr	Long Beach, CA
G	11	Brian Williams	5 ft 10 in (1.78 m)	165 lb (75 kg)	So	Los Angeles, CA

Head coach

Bill Mulligan

Assistant coach(es)

- Mike Bokosky
- Mike Scarano

Legend

- (C) Team captain
- (S) Suspended
- (I) Ineligible
- (W) Walk-on
- Injured
- Current redshirt

Roster
Last update: September 15, 2017

== Schedule ==
Date time, TV	Rank^{#}	Opponent^{#}	Result	Record	Site (attendance) city, state
Non-Conference Season
November 26, 1984*		at Colorado	L 73–80	0–1	CU Events/Conference Center (4,772); Boulder, CO
November 29, 1984*		San Diego State	L 77–86	0–2	Anaheim Convention Center (2,094); Anaheim, CA
December 1, 1984*		Loyola Marymount	L 66–76	0–3	Crawford Hall (1,373); Irvine, CA
December 6, 1984*		at Hawaii Pacific	W 83–75	1–3	McKinley Gym (704); Honolulu, HI
December 8, 1984*		at Hawaii	W 87–82	2–3	Neal S. Blaisdell Center (4,000); Honolulu, HI
December 15, 1984*		at Montana	L 68–83	2–4	Dahlberg Arena (5,886); Missoula, MT
December 15, 1984*		at Portland	L 69–86	2–5	Chiles Center (2,353); Portland, OR
December 19, 1984*		Southern Utah	W 95–59	3–5	Crawford Hall (889); Irvine, CA
December 20, 1984*		Pepperdine	W 95–59	4–5	Crawford Hall (953); Irvine, CA
December 28, 1984*		vs. Nebraska; Cable Car Classic	L 67–73	4–6	Toso Pavilion (2,335); Santa Clara, CA
December 29, 1984*		vs. Cincinnati; Cable Car Classic	W 99–81	5–6	Toso Pavilion (3,674); Santa Clara, CA
Conference Season
January 3, 1985		at San Jose State	L 71–93	5–7 (0–1)	San Jose Civic Auditorium (1,496); San Jose, CA
January 5, 1985		at Utah State	W 83–73	6–7 (1–1)	Smith Spectrum (8,005); Logan, UT
January 9, 1985		Fresno State	L 66–72	6–8 (1–2)	Crawford Hall (1,496); Irvine, CA
January 12, 1985		Pacific	W 69–64	7–8 (2–2)	Crawford Hall (1,004); Irvine, CA
January 14, 1985		New Mexico State	L 89–91	7–9 (2–3)	Crawford Hall (1,096); Irvine, CA
January 17, 1985		Cal State Fullerton	L 80–89	7–10 (2–4)	Crawford Hall (1,496); Irvine, CA
January 19, 1985		at UC Santa Barbara	L 67–70 ^{OT}	7–11 (2–5)	UC Santa Barbara Events Center (2,119); Santa Barbara, CA
January 24, 1985		at Long Beach State	W 99–84	8–11 (3–5)	Long Beach Arena (1,556); Long Beach, CA
January 26, 1985		at New Mexico State	W 78–75	9–11 (4–5)	Pan American Center (7,831); Las Cruces, NM
January 31, 1985		Utah State	L 84–87	9–12 (4–6)	Crawford Hall (1,263); Irvine, CA
February 2, 1985		San Jose State	W 78–77	10–12 (5–6)	Crawford Hall (1,385); Irvine, CA
February 9, 1985		at Pacific	W 70–65	11–12 (6–6)	Alex G. Spanos Center (3,820); Stockton, CA
February 11, 1985		at Fresno State	L 40–52	11–13 (6–7)	Selland Arena (10,114); Fresno, CA
February 16, 1985		No. 14 UNLV	L 89–99	11–14 (6–8)	Crawford Hall (1,496); Irvine, CA
February 20, 1985		Long Beach State	W 75–67	12–14 (7–8)	Crawford Hall (927); Irvine, CA
February 25, 1985		UC Santa Barbara	W 84–76	13–14 (8–8)	Crawford Hall (1,257); Irvine, CA
February 27, 1985		at No. 9 UNLV	L 95–97	13–15 (8–9)	Thomas & Mack Center (11,692); Paradise, NV
March 2, 1985		at Cal State Fullerton	L 74–84	13–16 (8–10)	Titan Gym (3,145); Fullerton, CA
PCAA tournament
March 7, 1985		vs. Cal State Fullerton; Quarterfinals	L 68–79	13–17	The Forum (10,147); Inglewood, CA
*Non-conference game. ^{#}Rankings from AP Poll. (#) Tournament seedings in parentheses. All times are in Pacific Time.

== Awards and honors ==
- Tod Murphy
  - AP Honorable Mention All-American
  - PCAA First Team All-Conference
- Johnny Rogers
  - PCAA Second Team All-Conference
- Wayne Engelstad
  - PCAA All-Freshman Team
