= Manhattan Center for Science and Mathematics =

Public school in New York City

Coordinates: 40°47′39″N 73°55′59″W

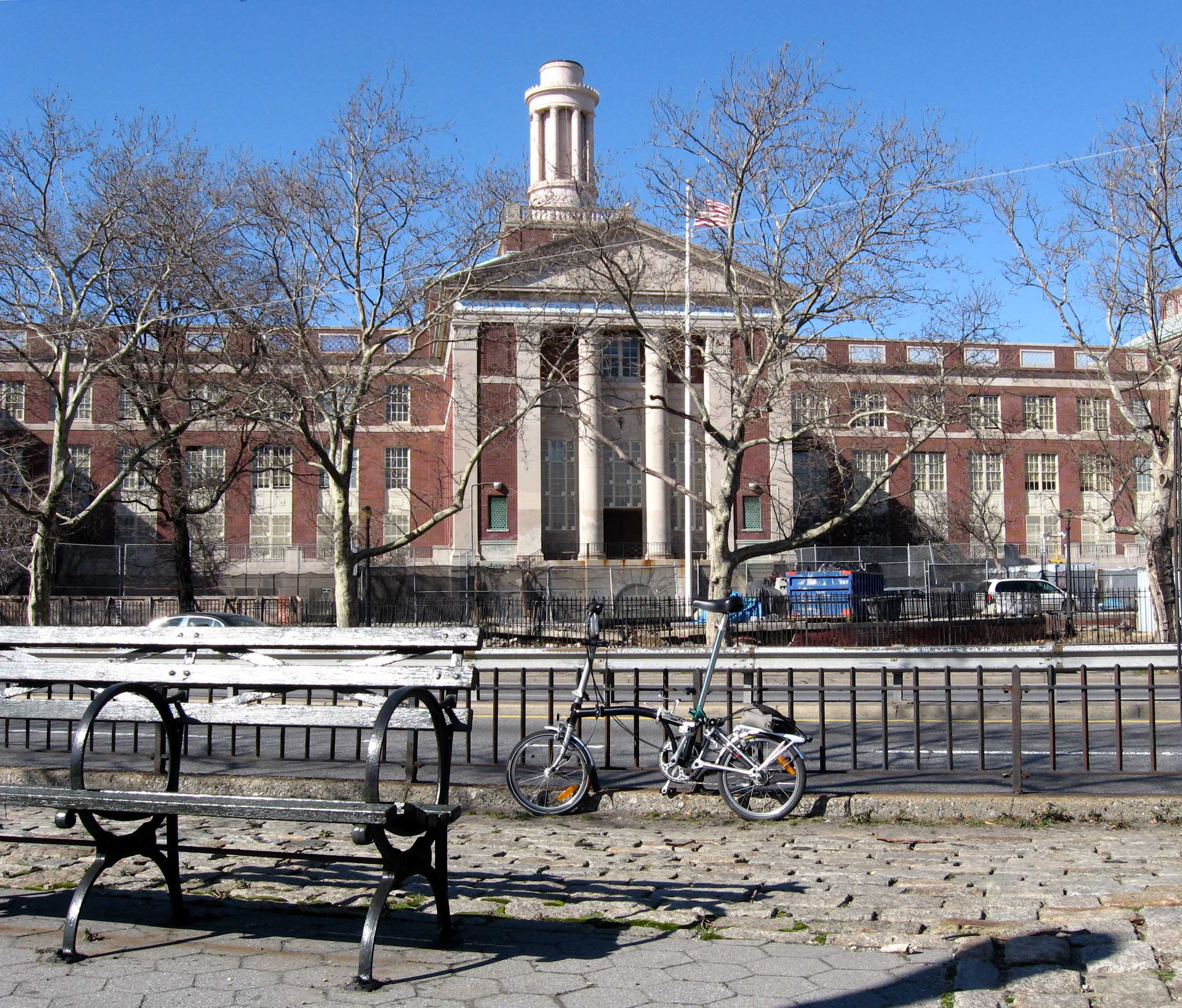
- Eastern side

Location
- 280 Pleasant Avenue; New York, NY 10029; United States

Information
- Type: Public, Secondary
- Established: 1982
- School district: 4
- Oversight: NYC DOE
- Principal: James Nicotri
- Grades: 9-12
- Enrollment: 1656
- Colors: Blue and White
- Mascot: Ram
- Website: http://www.mcsm.net

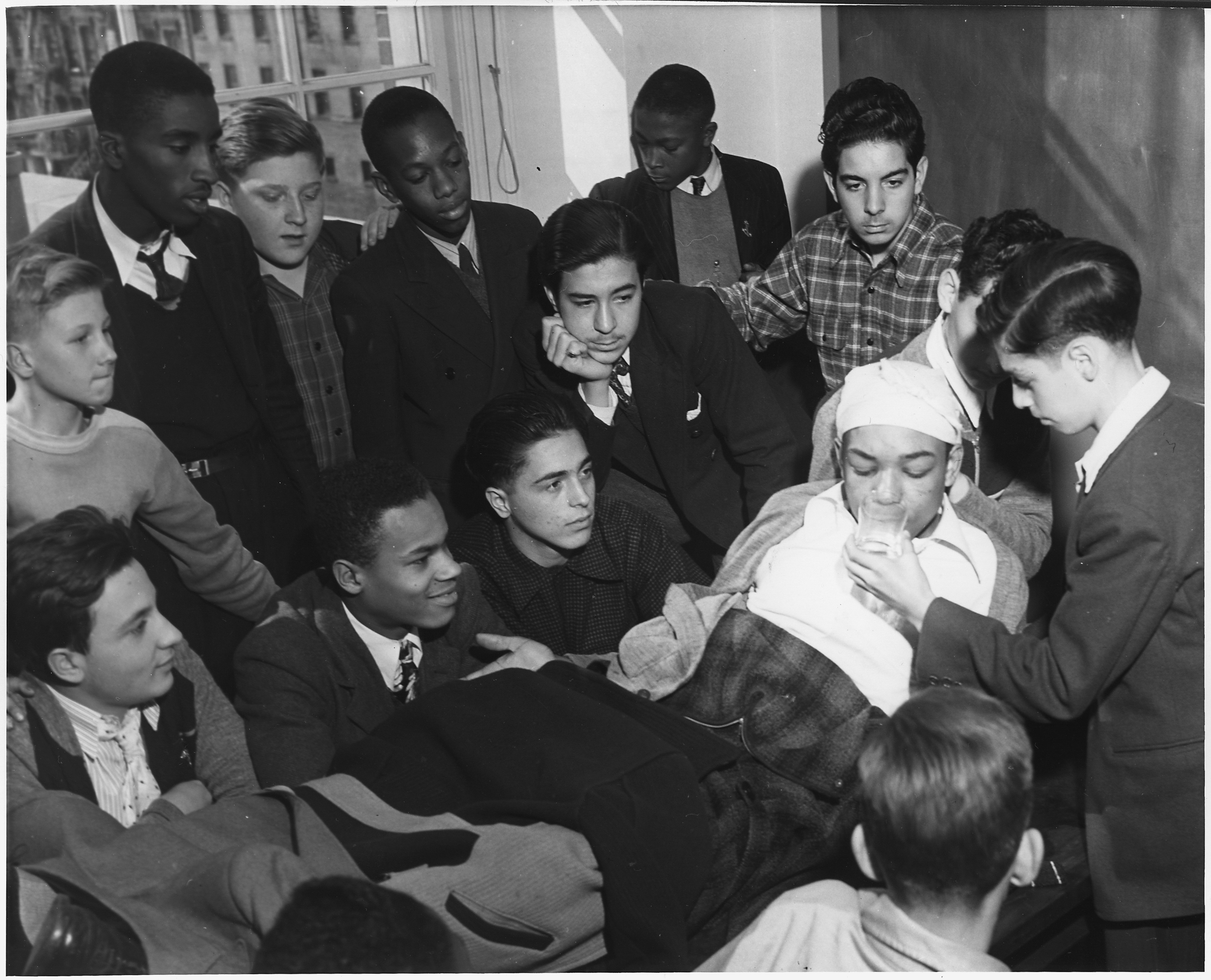
Wartime first aid class, when this was Benjamin Franklin High

Manhattan Center for Science and Mathematics (abbreviated as MCSM) is a public high school at East 116th Street between Pleasant Avenue and FDR Drive in East Harlem, within Upper Manhattan, New York City.

The school building, which was formerly Benjamin Franklin High School, was designated a New York City landmark by the New York City Landmarks Preservation Commission on May 29, 2018.

== History ==
The precursor of MCSM in the same building, Benjamin Franklin High School opened in 1934 and was sited at 200 Pleasant Avenue, between 114th Street and 116th Street. A long-time principal there was pioneering educational theorist Leonard Covello, the city's first Italian-American principal.

The New York City Board of Education shuttered the school in June 1982 for performance issues and converted the building into a four-year high school, the Manhattan Center for Science and Mathematics, and a grade 6-8 middle school, the Isaac Newton Middle School for Math and Science, effective September 1982. A CNN news clip can be seen highlighting the effective changes made during the transition from Benjamin Franklin High School to MCSM. It contrasts the school's transformation with the socioeconomic conditions of the surrounding area, illustrating the impact these changes had on students' perspectives and education.

== Description ==
Like all New York City high schools, admission is by application. Admissions for Manhattan Center for Science and Mathematics uses academic screening through the NYCPS high school admissions process.

The academic performance of this school is extremely high, as measured by New York State Regents Examinations scores, scholarship rates and a 95% graduation rate. MCSM is consistently one of the highest performing schools in the State of New York. In 2007, David Jimenez became the Principal. In 2009, MCSM graduated 97% of its students. Students graduating from Manhattan Center have attended top-notch colleges, including Ivy League colleges.

The curriculum includes Advanced Placement courses and special programs, and research and internship opportunities. The school offers AP World History, AP Art History, AP Macroeconomics, AP US Government, AP US History, AP English Language and Composition, AP English Literature and Composition, AP Precalculus, AP Calculus AB, AP Calculus BC, AP Physics C, AP Biology, AP Chemistry, AP Statistics, AP Computer Science Principles, AP Spanish Language and Culture, AP Psychology and AP Spanish Literature and Culture. There are several honors and accelerated courses.

=== Extra curricular activities ===
Manhattan Center specifically partners with many organizations including UAlbany which hosts ASR or (Advanced Science Research).

Manhattan Center partners with institutions of higher education, such as New York University, Columbia University, Cornell and CUNY, to offer courses in science, mathematics and humanities. Through these partnerships and Mount Sinai Hospital, Metropolitan Hospital Center, General Electric, Sponsors for Educational Opportunity, American Globe Theatre, and Manhattan Theatre Club there is a wide range of opportunities for one-on-one mentoring, internship experiences, academic enrichment and summer programs. They also provide support services, and a variety of sports, clubs and leadership activities for students.

== Notable alumni ==
Franklin High

- Richie Adams (1980)
- Walter Berry (1982)
- John Carro (1945)
- Pedro Espada, Jr. (1971)
- Elmo Hope (late 1930s)
- Floyd Layne
- Daniel Patrick Moynihan (1944)
- Johnny Rivera
- Sonny Rollins (1948)
- Edward V. Sparer
- Gary Springer (1980)
- Isaac Walthour (1949)

MCSM

- Cam'ron
- Richie Parker (1994)
- Damon Dash
- Sanaa Lathan
- Mase
- Mekhi Phifer
- Hisham Tawfiq
- Emerita Torres, NY State Assemblyperson for the 85th District (Bronx)
- Zainab Johnson
