= Holcombe Rucker =

American activist (1926–65)

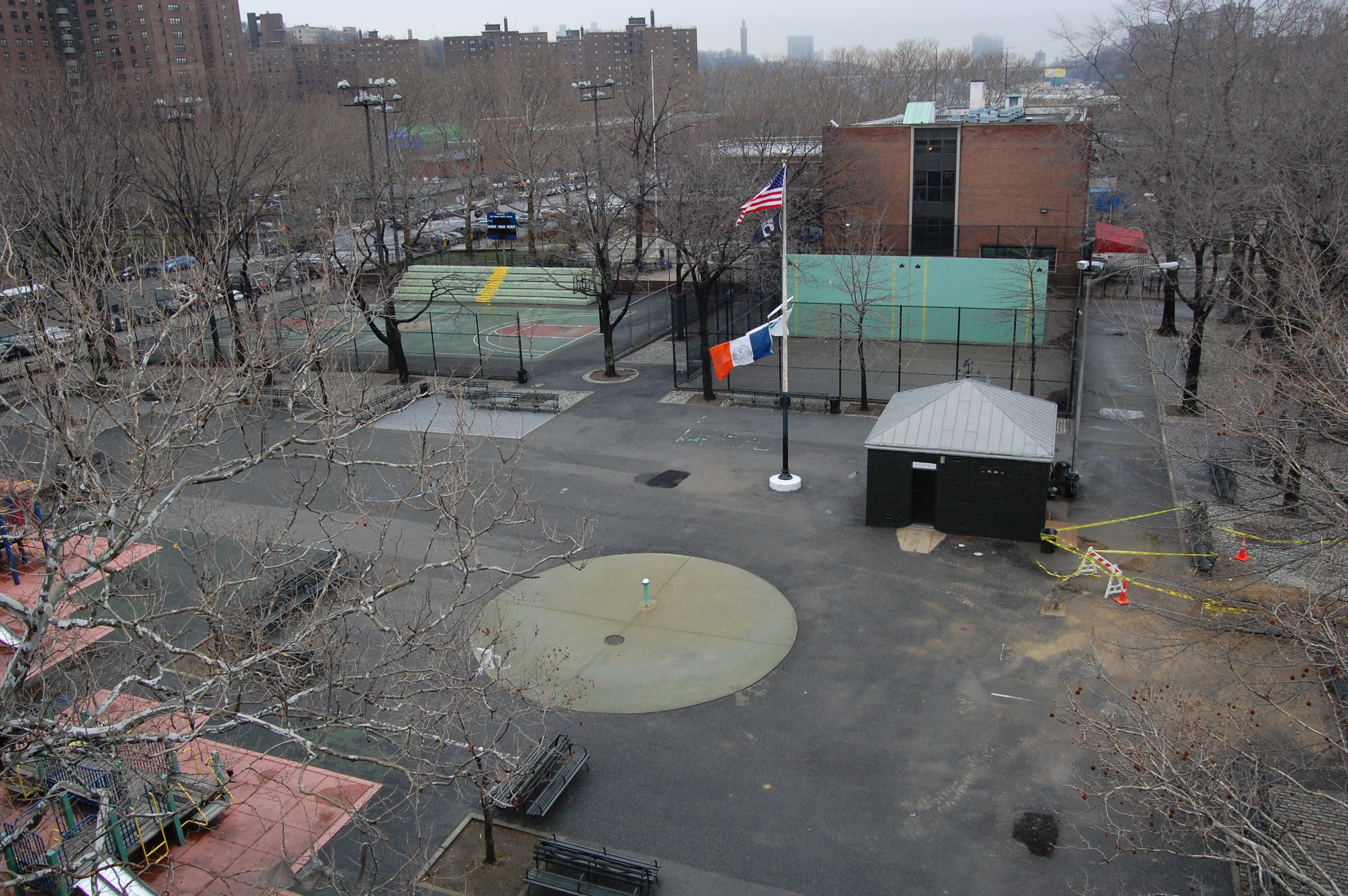
Photograph of Rucker Park

Holcombe Rucker (March 2, 1926 – March 20, 1965) was a playground director in Harlem for the New York City Department of Parks & Recreation from 1948 to 1964. He founded the New York City pro-am basketball tournament, that still bears his name and is the namesake of a world-famous basketball court in Harlem.

Rucker, who grew up in Manhattan, started the tournament in 1950 at a playground on 7th Avenue between 128th and 129th streets. He insisted that education be a fundamental part of the Rucker League, in keeping with its motto — "Each one, teach one." Through his efforts, over 700 individuals were able to obtain basketball scholarships to help finance their education. He mentored many people including streetball legend, Earl Manigault

The tournament grew into the stuff of legend in the 1960s, when many NBA stars such as Wilt Chamberlain participated.

Rucker attended City College of New York and graduated in 1962 with a degree in Education. He went on to teach English at J.H.S. 139 before he died of cancer in 1965 at age 39.

In 1974 the city renamed P.S. 156 Playground, located at 155th Street and Frederick Douglass Boulevard, as Holcombe Rucker Playground in dedication to his community efforts. Rucker's basketball tournament had moved there in 1965, and Holcombe Rucker Basketball Court — now arguably the most famous street court in the world — remains a proving ground for the region's most talented players.

== See also ==
Holcombe L Rucker School of Community Research
