= Entertainer's Basketball Classic =

American basketball tournament

Entertainer's Basketball Classic is a basketball tournament held at Rucker Park in New York City. It was founded by Greg Marius in 1982. In 1986, the original Rucker Park Tournament became the Entertainers Basketball Classic. Participants in the tournament have included NBA professionals such as Allen Iverson, Stephon Marbury, Wilt Chamberlain, Kobe Bryant, Julius Erving, and Kyrie Irving, as well NCAA elite players from schools like Syracuse University.

Additionally, entertainers who have attended the event include musician Cam'ron, Jay-Z, Fat Joe Denzel Washington, Bill Clinton, Snoop Dogg, Bill Cosby, and David Stern. The event is often sponsored by companies like Reebok, MTV, and And1. The MSG, ESPN, and the NBA often broadcast games on their channels.
