= Rucker Park =

Basketball court in Manhattan, New York

Holcombe Rucker Park National Commemorative Site
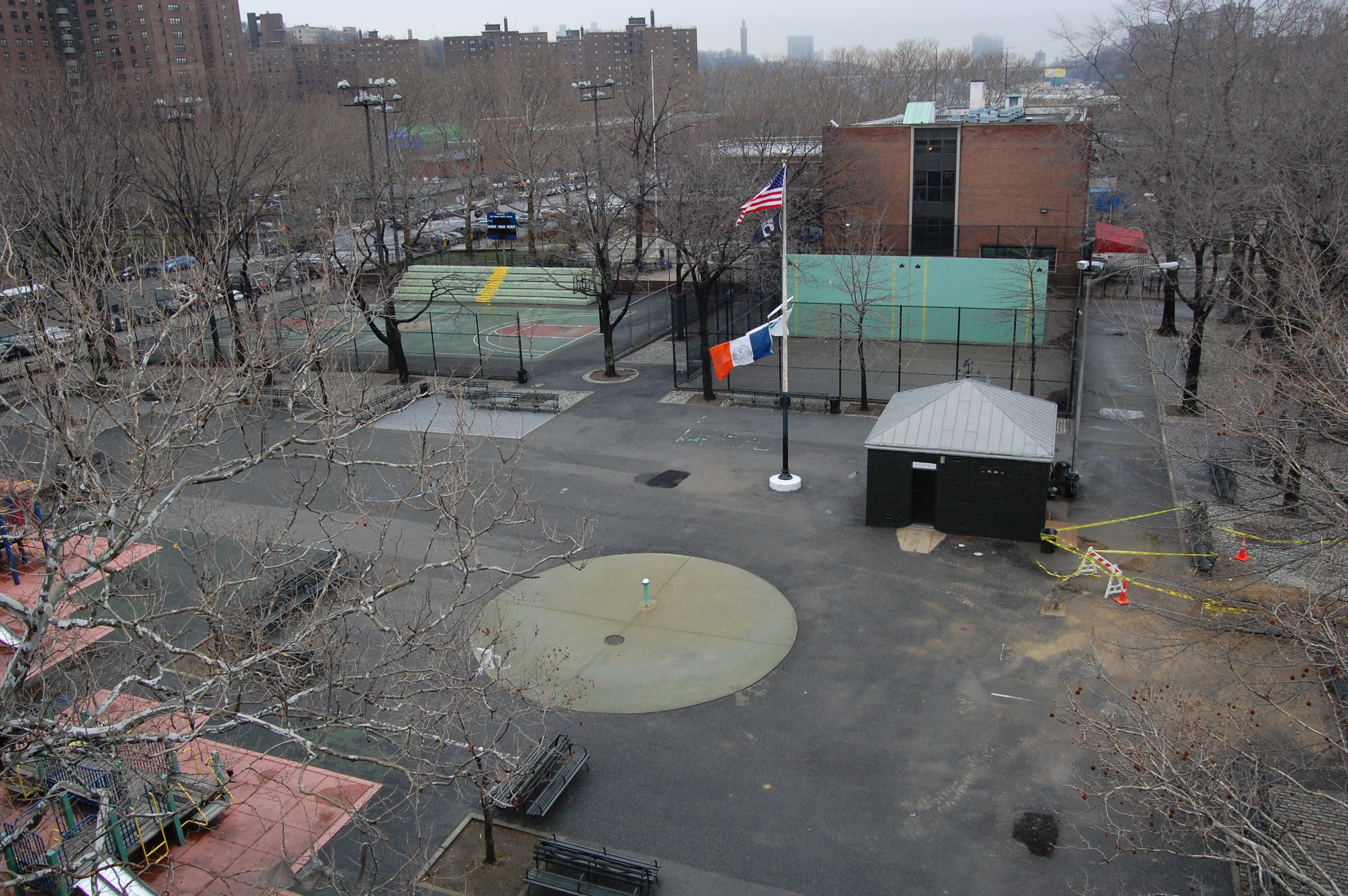
- Rucker Park in 2008, with Frederick Douglass Boulevard at left
- Interactive map of Holcombe Rucker Park; National Commemorative Site
- Location: Manhattan, New York City
- Coordinates: 40.829564°N 73.936465°W
- Area: 3.05 acres (1.23 ha)
- Owner: NYC Parks
- Website: www.nycgovparks.org/parks/holcombe-rucker-park

Greg Marius Court at Holcombe Rucker Park is a basketball court at the border of Harlem and the Coogan's Bluff section of Washington Heights neighborhoods of Manhattan, at 155th Street and Frederick Douglass Boulevard.

Rucker Park, founded in 1956 as P.S. 156 Playground, has been a cornerstone of basketball history, hosting Harlem's popular summer Rucker Tournament for decades. The events made the court a legendary proving ground for both amateur and professional talent, shaping the game’s culture and style worldwide.

Many who competed in the Rucker Tournament, later named the Entertainer’s Basketball Classic, rose to fame, whether as streetball legends, rising stars using it as a launchpad, or NBA players returning to test their skills in its electrifying atmosphere.

== History ==
=== Holcombe Rucker and summer tournaments ===
In 1950, Holcombe Rucker, a local teacher and a playground director for the New York City Department of Parks and Recreation, founded what is believed to be New York City's first annual summer basketball tournament in an effort to help less fortunate kids stay off the streets. Initially, the tournament consisted of kids in junior high and younger, but in 1953, it was expanded to include high school and college-aged players as many of the original participants advanced to high school and older players expressed interest in joining. This change led to a significant rise in popularity, attracting large crowds of players and spectators from across the city, eager to catch a glimpse of what was considered the best basketball the city had to offer. The early years of the tournament were not held at Rucker, but eventually the event moved to the historic Harlem park.

Deeply committed to the education of his participants, Rucker began reaching out to college scouts and coaches, hoping to secure athletic scholarships for his players. His efforts resulted in increased recognition for the tournament and awarded more than 700 scholarships to his players. As the level of talent grew, so did public interest, making "The Rucker" a house hold name across New York City and recognized across the country.

==== Professional league ====
In 1954, Rucker founded a professional summer league in an attempt to capitalize on the admiration and popularity his tournaments had built over the years. With no formal professional summer leagues or training camps at the time, pro talent from across the country began traveling to Rucker Park during their summer off-seasons to compete against the top amateur stars from other Rucker divisions. This established a certain mystique that became Rucker Park’s signature—a legacy that continues to this day.

=== P.S. 156 Playground founded ===
P.S. 156 Playground was opened in 1956 next to the PS 156 public school, just east of the former Polo Grounds site. It is geographically at the base of a large cliff named Coogan's Bluff, near the border of Harlem and the Washington Heights neighborhoods of Manhattan, at 155th Street and Frederick Douglass Boulevard.. The land that the park is on was once the site of the 8th Avenue Railroad Company.

Notably, Wilt Chamberlain first played at the park in 1957, becoming one of the first professional stars to take part. Players in the Rucker Tournament featured slam dunks, crossover dribbles, and bravado that excited the crowd, a playing style then foreign to the National Basketball Association (NBA).

=== Golden era and the Rucker Pro League: 1960s–1970s ===
In the late 1960s and early 1970s, many of the biggest stars in basketball came to play in the Rucker summer league. Kareem Abdul-Jabbar, Julius Erving, and Nate "Tiny" Archibald are notable professional players who faced off against Rucker amateurs at a time when they were the faces of professional basketball. Erving in particular gained early recognition at Rucker Park, dazzling crowds with his athleticism. He is often credited with bringing the streetball style to the NBA, and Rucker Park is frequently cited as the place where he developed his signature moves.

After Rucker's death in 1965, his protégés Bob McCullough and Freddie Crawford founded the Rucker Pro League. In 1974, the park was renamed for Rucker himself.

=== Decline and revival: The Entertainers Basketball Classic (EBC) ===
After quieter years in the 1970s, when the tournament was forced indoors and professional players grew increasingly cautious of injury, Rucker Park saw a revival with the founding of the Entertainers Basketball Classic (EBC) in 1982 by Greg Marius. Marius used strategic promotions and corporate sponsorships to attract talent, and turned storied mystique of pro-versus-playground matchups into a powerful branding tool.

The EBC brought Rucker Park back into the mainstream and further cemented its deep connection to hip-hop culture. By the late 1990s and early 2000s, Rucker Park had become a prominent fixture in both hip-hop and pop culture. Rappers Fat Joe and Jay-Z each had teams in the EBC, blending NBA superstars, rising talent, and legendary streetball players into one of the most electrifying basketball scenes of the era.

=== Modern developments and recognition ===
In June 2017, New York City mayor Bill de Blasio renamed the court after Marius. The park underwent $520,000 in renovations between August and October 2021, funded in part by the National Basketball Players Association and New York City Department of Parks and Recreation. In addition to the basketball court, the park has a baseball field, handball courts, children's playground, bathrooms, and a spray shower.

In 2025, the park was named a National Commemorative Site in an effort to recognize the park’s importance in the development of basketball and honor the legacy of Holcombe Rucker.

== Notable players ==
Although many professional basketball players have played at the court after gaining prominence, many others developed their basketball skills at Rucker prior to becoming notable in the sport. Notable players who have played at Rucker Park include but are not limited to:

- Kareem Abdul-Jabbar
- Miles Aiken
- Rafer "Skip 2 My Lou" Alston
- Kenny Anderson
- Nate "Tiny" Archibald
- Metta Sandiford-Artest
- Sylvester Blye
- Kobe Bryant
- Wilt Chamberlain
- Kevin Durant
- Julius "Dr. J" Erving
- Ray Felix
- Cooper Flagg
- Connie "the Hawk" Hawkins
- "Jumpin" Jackie Jackson
- Barry Leibowitz
- Nancy Lieberman
- Stephon Marbury
- Jamal Mashburn
- Earl Monroe
- Chris Mullin
- Aulcie Perry
- Satch Sanders
- Paul Silas
- Brian Taylor
- Sebastian Telfair
- Jamaal Tinsley
- Kemba Walker
- Harthorne Wingo

Other amateur players who made a name for themselves at Rucker but never played in the ABA or NBA included Earl Manigault, Joe Hammond, and Pee Wee Kirkland.

== In media and popular culture ==
Rucker Park was featured in the TNT television film On Hallowed Ground: Streetball Champions of Rucker Park, which aired in May 2000 and won a Sports Emmy Award. It was also featured in the 2018 film Uncle Drew starring Kyrie Irving.

In 2022, Rucker Park became the first outdoor venue for The Basketball Tournament, a single-elimination winner-take-all tournament with a $1 million prize, acting as one of eight regional venues of the competition.
