= List of University of Detroit Mercy people =

List of people associated with the University of Detroit Mercy

The following is a list of notable people associated with the University of Detroit Mercy, located in Detroit, Michigan.

== Notable alumni ==
=== Academics ===
- Andreas Blass, mathematician and professor at University of Michigan
- Kevin Boyle, winner of 2004 National Book Award for Arc of Justice: A Saga of Race, Civil Rights, and Murder in the Jazz Age; Professor of History at Ohio State University
- Thomas Budzynski, psychologist and a pioneer in the field of biofeedback
- John A. DiBiaggio, former president of University of Connecticut, Michigan State University and Tufts University
- David J. Jackson, political scientist at Bowling Green State University
- Dudley Randall, poet, librarian, poet-in-residence

=== Acting, theater, film and television ===
- Anita Barone, actress
- Phil Cousineau, author, lecturer, independent scholar, screenwriter, and documentary filmmaker
- Pamela Anne Eldred, Miss America 1970
- David Patrick Kelly, actor
- Keegan-Michael Key, actor
- Connie Kreski (Kornacki), actress, 1969 Playboy Playmate of the Year
- Allison Payne, news anchor
- Ted Raimi, actor, best known for his roles on seaQuest DSV and Xena: Warrior Princess
- Amy Yasbeck, actress

=== Business ===
- Marilyn Fisher Lundy, president and CEO of the League of Catholic Women
- A. C. Muthiah, chairman-emeritus of Southern Petrochemical Industries Limited; chairman of Sri Venkateswara College of Engineering
- Thomas Thewes, co-founder of Compuware Corporation

=== Engineering and architecture ===
- J. Thomas McCarthy, internationally recognized authority in the field of trademarks
- Otmar Szafnauer, Former Team Principal Alpine F1 Team; former COO of Sahara Force India Formula 1 Team; former programs manager at Ford

=== Journalism and writing ===
- Bill Bonds, former longtime anchor of WXYZ-TV news
- Ron Fournier, Associated Press, chief of Washington bureau
- Elmore Leonard, author, several of whose books have been made into movies, such as Get Shorty, Be Cool, and The Big Bounce
- J. P. McCarthy, former radio host on Detroit station WJR
- George Noory, syndicated radio talk show host (Coast to Coast AM)
- Allison Payne, former anchorwoman with WGN-TV, Chicago

=== Government and politics ===
- Richard Arrington, Jr., first African-American mayor of Birmingham, Alabama
- Donald W. Banner, former United States commissioner of Patents and Trademarks
- Kyra Harris Bolden, justice of the Michigan Supreme Court
- Thomas E. Brennan, justice of the Michigan Supreme Court (1967–1973); served as chief justice 1969–1970; founded the Thomas M. Cooley Law School
- Vincent M. Brennan, Michigan politician
- James H. Brickley, 54th and 56th lieutenant governor of Michigan and a justice of the Michigan Supreme Court 1982–1999
- Vern Buchanan, Republican congressman representing Florida's 16th congressional district
- Tim Burns, Michigan politician
- Pamela Carter, 38th Indiana attorney general (1993–1997)
- Jerome Cavanagh, mayor of Detroit, 1962–1970
- Michael F. Cavanagh, justice of the Michigan Supreme Court, 1982–2014 (served as chief justice 1991–1995)
- Bob Constan, Michigan State House of Representatives
- Maura D. Corrigan, director, Michigan Department of Human Services; former justice of the Michigan Supreme Court, 1998–2011 (served as chief justice 2001–2004)
- George Cushingberry, Jr., Michigan House of Representatives
- James Dinkins, executive associate director of Homeland Security Investigations 2010–2014
- Robert A. Ficano, county executive of Wayne County, Michigan, 2013–2015
- Roman S. Gribbs, mayor of Detroit, 1970–1974, judge of the Michigan Court of Appeals
- Frank J. Kelley, longest-serving attorney general in Michigan history (1961–1998)
- Theodore Levin, U.S. District Court judge (1946–1970); father of Charles and Joseph Levin; uncle of Senator Carl Levin and Representative Sander Levin
- Greg Mathis, retired Michigan 36th District Court judge and syndicated television show judge
- E. Michael McCann, former Milwaukee County district attorney
- Thaddeus McCotter, former member of the U.S. House of Representatives from Michigan's 11th congressional district (2003–2012)
- Zenaida Moya, mayor of Belize City, Belize, 2006–2012
- L. Brooks Patterson, lawyer and politician, formerly the county executive of Oakland County, Michigan
- Gary Peters, United States senator from Michigan, former member of the U.S. House of Representatives from Michigan's 9th congressional district
- Haider Abbas Rizvi, former member of the National Assembly of Pakistan; a senior leader of the Muttahida Qaumi Movement (MQM) party
- James L. Ryan, retired justice of the Michigan Supreme Court, 1975–1985; judge of the U.S. Court of Appeals, 6th Circuit, 1985–present
- Thomas Patrick Thornton, United States federal judge

=== Military and space ===
- Richard F. Abel, former United States Air Force brig. general
- Paul Bikle, former director of the NASA Flight Research Center
- Robert J. Elder, Jr, former United States Air Force lt. general
- Glynn Lunney, NASA flight director

=== Religion ===
- Joseph M. Breitenbeck, eighth bishop of Grand Rapids, 1969–1989
- Joseph Cassidy, Anglican priest
- Gary Habermas, PhD, philosophical theologian and apologist; defender of Christ's historical Resurrection
- Dario Hunter, first Muslim-born person to be ordained a rabbi
- Dale Joseph Melczek, third bishop of Gary, since 1996
- Robert A. Mitchell, 1st chancellor of University of Detroit Mercy (1990–1992)
- Steven J. Raica, fifth bishop of Gaylord, since 2014
- Francis R. Reiss, auxiliary bishop of Detroit, since 2003
- Jane Dewar Schaberg (1977–2012), professor of Religious Studies and Women's Studies

=== Sports ===
- Grady Alderman, offensive lineman for 1969 NFL champion Minnesota Vikings and General Manager of Denver Broncos
- John Barrett (1899–1966), professional football player
- Dan Boisture (1925–2007), coach of Eastern Michigan (1967–73) and Detroit Wheels (1974) football teams
- Lloyd Brazil (1906–1965), U of D coach and athletic director
- Frank Bucher (1900–1970), professional football player
- Wes Carlson, professional football player
- Walt Cassidy (1899–1944), professional football player
- Gus Cifelli (1926–2009), football player for Notre Dame and 1952 NFL champion Detroit Lions
- Earl Cureton, NBA player for Philadelphia 76ers, Houston Rockets, Detroit Pistons, 2-time NBA champion
- Dave DeBusschere (1940–2003), NBA Hall of Fame, played basketball for Detroit Pistons and New York Knicks, coach of Pistons; also played baseball for Chicago White Sox
- Terry Duerod, former NBA player, Detroit Pistons, Boston Celtics
- Bill Ebben, former NBA player
- Andrew "Anvil Andy" Farkas (1916–2001), player for 1942 NFL champion Washington Redskins
- Tom Finnin, former NFL player for Baltimore Colts
- Willie Green, basketball player for NBA's Orlando Magic, assistant coach Golden State Warriors, head coach New Orleans Pelicans.
- Jody Handley, soccer player for England women's national football team
- Spencer Haywood, U of D basketball player, Olympic gold medalist, 4-time NBA All-Star, Basketball Hall of Fame
- Dave Hill (1937–2011), PGA Tour golfer with 13 tour wins
- Lee Knorek (1921–2003), NBA player for New York Knicks
- Joe Kopicki, professional basketball player
- Dutch Lauer (1898–1978), professional football player
- John Long, professional basketball player, member of 1989 NBA champion Detroit Pistons
- Bruce Maher, former NFL player for Detroit Lions
- Ted Marchibroda (1931–2016), twice head coach of NFL's Baltimore Colts/Indianapolis Colts, offensive co-ordinator for Buffalo Bills Super Bowl teams
- Ray McCallum, Jr., NBA player for San Antonio Spurs
- Bob Miller (1926–2020), former MLB player (1949–58) and U-D baseball coach (1965–2000); career Titans coaching record of 896-780-2; named to Titans Hall of Fame 1979
- Guy Murray, Detroit Titans cross country/track and field head coach
- Dorie Murrey, NBA player for Detroit Pistons, Seattle SuperSonics
- A. C. Muthiah, president of Board of Control for Cricket in India 1999–2001
- Tip O'Neill (1898–1984), professional football player
- Andrew Ornoch, Mississauga Eagles FC
- Chase Simon (born 1989), basketball player for Maccabi Ashdod of the Israeli Basketball Premier League
- Jimmy Simpson (1897–1979), professional football player
- Gino Sovran (1924–2016), professional basketball player
- Guy Sparrow, former NBA player for New York Knicks
- Art Stolkey (1920–2013), professional basketball player
- Terry Thomas (1953–1998), former NBA player
- Terry Tyler, NBA player for Detroit Pistons, Sacramento Kings
- Owen Wells (1950–1993), professional basketball player

== Notable faculty ==
- Richard Buckminster "Bucky" Fuller, visiting professor in the School of Architecture at University of Detroit, 1970
- Robert S. Johnston (1901–1902), classics, English, and mathematics teacher; later president of Saint Louis University
- Isaiah McKinnon
- John P. McNichols, S.J., Jesuit priest and 11th president of University of Detroit 1921–1932; established the McNichols Campus; namesake of McNichols Road in Detroit
- Frank Murphy, law instructor; Michigan jurist; Mayor of Detroit; Governor of Michigan; the last Governor-General of the Philippines; and the first High Commissioner of the Philippines, United States Attorney General, and United States Supreme Court Associate Justice
- Joyce Carol Oates, taught at the University of Detroit; published her first novel, With Shuddering Fall, when she was 26 years old; her novel them received the National Book Award in 1970; has taught at Princeton University since 1978
- Dick Vitale, basketball coach and broadcaster, head coach of Detroit Titans men's basketball 1973–1977
