= Detroit Mercy Titans men's basketball statistical leaders =

The Detroit Mercy Titans basketball statistical leaders are individual statistical leaders of the Detroit Mercy Titans men's basketball program in various categories, including points, rebounds, assists, steals, and blocks. Within those areas, the lists identify single-game, single-season, and career leaders. The Titans represent the University of Detroit Mercy (UDM) in the NCAA Division I Horizon League.

UDM was established in its current form in 1990, when the University of Detroit (UD) merged with the nearby Mercy College of Detroit. With the merger, UDM inherited the UD athletic program, along with all of its records. The history of UDM men's basketball thus dates to UD's first season of basketball competition in 1905, when the school was known as Detroit College. However, the school's record book does not generally list records from before the 1950s, as records from before this period are often incomplete and inconsistent. Since scoring was much lower in this era, and teams played much fewer games during a typical season, it is likely that few or no players from this era would appear on these lists anyway.

Official NCAA basketball records date only to the 1937–38 season, the first of what it calls the "modern era" of men's basketball, following the abolition of the center jump after each made basket. Official statistical rankings in scoring began in 1947–48. Individual rebounds and assists were first officially recorded in the 1950–51 season; while rebounds have been recorded in each subsequent season, the NCAA stopped recording individual assists after the 1951–52 season, not resuming that practice until 1983–84. Individual blocks and steals were first officially recorded in 1985–86. UDM nonetheless includes player statistics from all men's basketball seasons in its record books, regardless of whether the NCAA officially recorded those statistics in the relevant seasons.

These lists are updated through UDM's win over Purdue Fort Wayne in the first round of the 2023 Horizon League tournament. Currently active players are indicated in bold.

== Scoring ==
Career
Rk	Player	Points	Seasons
1	**Antoine Davis**	3,664	2018–19 2019–20 2020–21 2021–22 2022–23
2	Rashad Phillips	2319	1997–98 1998–99 1999–00 2000–01
3	John Long	2167	1974–75 1975–76 1976–77 1977–78
4	Dave DeBusschere	1985	1959–60 1960–61 1961–62
5	Willie Green	1779	1999–00 2000–01 2001–02 2002–03
6	Archie Tullos	1731	1984–85 1985–86 1986–87 1987–88
7	Terry Duerod	1690	1975–76 1976–77 1977–78 1978–79
8	Terry Tyler	1649	1974–75 1975–76 1976–77 1977–78
9	Ray McCallum	1618	2010–11 2011–12 2012–13
10	Guy Sparrow	1608	1952–53 1953–54 1954–55
	Dwayne Kelley	1608	1989–90 1990–91 1991–92 1992–93

Season
Rk	Player	Points	Season
1	**Antoine Davis**	930	2022–23
2	Rashad Phillips	785	2000–01
3	**Antoine Davis**	784	2018–19
4	Spencer Haywood	771	1968–69
5	Archie Tullos	752	1987–88
6	Rashad Phillips	735	1999–00
7	**Antoine Davis**	729	2019–20
8	Bill Ebben	724	1956–57
9	Dave DeBusschere	696	1961–62
10	**Antoine Davis**	694	2021–22

Single game
Rk	Player	Points	Season	Opponent
1	Archie Tullos	49	1987–88	Bradley

== Rebounds ==
Career
Rk	Player	Rebounds	Seasons
1	Dave DeBusschere	1552	1959–60 1960–61 1961–62
2	Dick Dzik	1158	1961–62 1962–63 1963–64
3	Terry Tyler	1151	1974–75 1975–76 1976–77 1977–78
4	Dorie Murrey	1140	1963–64 1964–65 1965–66
5	Don Haase	931	1955–56 1956–57 1957–58
6	Bruce Rodwan	907	1965–66 1966–67 1967–68
7	Terrell Riggs	865	1999–00 2000–01 2001–02 2002–03
8	Guy Sparrow	829	1952–53 1953–54 1954–55
9	John Long	815	1974–75 1975–76 1976–77 1977–78
10	Joe Kopicki	771	1978–79 1979–80 1980–81 1981–82

Season
Rk	Player	Rebounds	Season
1	Dave DeBusschere	540	1959–60
2	Spencer Haywood	530	1968–69
3	Dick Dzik	521	1963–64
4	Dave DeBusschere	514	1960–61
5	Dave DeBusschere	498	1961–62
6	Guy Sparrow	489	1954–55
7	Dorie Murrey	418	1965–66
8	Dick Dzik	385	1962–63
9	Don Haase	375	1957–58
10	Dorie Murrey	366	1964–65

Single game
Rk	Player	Rebounds	Season	Opponent
1	Dave DeBusschere	39	1959–60	CMU

== Assists ==
Career
Rk	Player	Assists	Seasons
1	Kevin McAdoo	615	1982–83 1983–84 1984–85 1985–86
2	Wilbert McCormick	611	1976–77 1977–78 1978–79 1979–80
3	**Antoine Davis**	593	2018–19 2019–20 2020–21 2021–22 2022–23
4	Dennis Boyd	563	1973–74 1974–75 1975–76 1976–77
5	Rashad Phillips	548	1997–98 1998–99 1999–00 2000–01
6	Jermaine Jackson	509	1995–96 1996–97 1997–98 1998–99
7	Bill Wood	474	1986–87 1987–88 1988–89 1989–90
8	Ray McCallum	451	2010–11 2011–12 2012–13
9	Michael Jackson	422	1991–92 1992–93 1993–94 1994–95
10	Ramsey Nichols	412	1989–90 1990–91 1991–92 1992–93

Season
Rk	Player	Assists	Season
1	Wilbert McCormick	220	1977–78
2	Dennis Boyd	219	1976–77
3	Kevin McAdoo	215	1985–86
4	Wilbert McCormick	184	1978–79
5	Rashad Phillips	169	1999–00
6	Ray McCallum	161	2010–11
7	Bill Wood	158	1988–89
8	Kevin McAdoo	157	1983–84
9	Jermaine Jackson	149	1997–98
10	Kevin McAdoo	147	1984–85
	Ray McCallum	147	2012–13

Single game
Rk	Player	Assists	Season	Opponent
1	Wilbert McCormick	19	1977–78	Canisius

== Steals ==
Career
Rk	Player	Steals	Seasons
1	Josh McFolley	201	2015–16 2016–17 2017–18 2018–19
2	Jerry Davis	195	1978–79 1979–80 1980–81 1981–82
3	Woody Payne	192	2006–07 2007–08 2008–09 2009–10
4	Rashad Phillips	190	1997–98 1998–99 1999–00 2000–01
5	**Antoine Davis**	181	2018–19 2019–20 2020–21 2021–22 2022–23
6	Ray McCallum	175	2010–11 2011–12 2012–13
7	John Long	154	1974–75 1975–76 1976–77 1977–78
	Terry Tyler	154	1974–75 1975–76 1976–77 1977–78
9	Roy Simms	152	1979–80 1980–81 1981–82 1982–83
10	Bill Wood	147	1986–87 1987–88 1988–89 1989–90

Season
Rk	Player	Steals	Season
1	Roy Simms	80	1982–83
2	Woody Payne	76	2009–10
3	Woody Payne	66	2008–09
4	Ray McCallum	64	2012–13
5	Terry Tyler	63	1976–77
6	Josh McFolley	62	2016–17
7	Jerry Davis	59	1978–79
	James Thues	59	2004–05
9	Jerry Davis	58	1980–81
	Archie Tullos	58	1987–88

Single game
Rk	Player	Steals	Season	Opponent
1	Jerry Davis	10	1980–81	John Carroll

== Blocks ==
Career
Rk	Player	Blocks	Seasons
1	Terry Tyler	359	1974–75 1975–76 1976–77 1977–78
2	Eli Holman	163	2009–10 2010–11 2011–12
3	LaMarcus Lower	157	2010–11 2011–12
4	Brian Humes	154	1983–84 1984–85 1985–86 1986–87
5	Greg Grant	131	1990–91 1991–92 1992–93 1993–94
6	Ryvon Covile	123	2002–03 2003–04 2004–05 2006–07
7	Brian Alexander	114	1995–96 1996–97 1997–98
8	Stacy Johnson	107	1987–88 1988–89
9	Alan Renner-Thomas	88	1992–93 1993–94 1994–95
10	Jerry Davis	87	1978–79 1979–80 1980–81 1981–82

Season
Rk	Player	Blocks	Season
1	Terry Tyler	172	1977–78
2	Terry Tyler	107	1975–76
3	Terry Tyler	86	1976–77
4	Eli Holman	77	2009–10
5	Greg Grant	65	1991–92
6	Stacy Johnson	63	1987–88
	Brian Humes	63	1985–86
8	Keith Jackson	61	1978–79
9	Alan Renner-Thomas	56	1993–94
	Brian Alexander	56	1997–98

Single game
Rk	Player	Blocks	Season	Opponent
1	Terry Tyler	13	1977–78	WMU
