= 1976–77 Detroit Titans men's basketball team =

American college basketball season

1976–77 Detroit Titans men's basketball
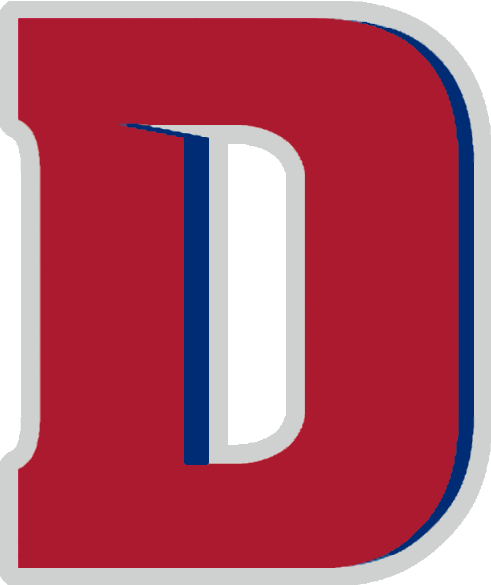

NCAA Tournament, Sweet Sixteen
- Conference: Independent

Ranking
- Coaches: No. 19
- AP: No. 12
- Record: 25–4
- Head coach: Dick Vitale (4th season)
- Assistant coach: Smokey Gaines (4th season)
- Home arena: Calihan Hall

1976–77 NCAA Division I men's basketball independents standings
	Conf.				Overall
Team	W		L	PCT	W		L	PCT
No. 4 UNLV		–		–	29	–	3	.906
Indiana State		–		–	25	–	3	.893
No. 6 Syracuse		–		–	26	–	4	.867
No. 12 Detroit		–		–	25	–	4	.862
Old Dominion		–		–	25	–	4	.862
Providence		–		–	24	–	5	.828
Holy Cross		–		–	23	–	6	.793
St. Bonaventure		–		–	23	–	6	.793
No. 7 Marquette		–		–	25	–	7	.781
North Texas State		–		–	21	–	6	.778
Illinois State		–		–	22	–	7	.759
No. 10 Notre Dame		–		–	22	–	7	.759
Creighton		–		–	21	–	7	.750
Oral Roberts		–		–	21	–	7	.750
Army		–		–	20	–	8	.714
St. John's		–		–	22	–	9	.710
Milwaukee		–		–	19	–	8	.704
Georgetown		–		–	19	–	9	.679
Virginia Tech		–		–	19	–	10	.655
James Madison		–		–	17	–	9	.654
Northwestern State		–		–	17	–	9	.654
Texas–Pan American		–		–	17	–	9	.654
Connecticut		–		–	17	–	10	.630
Seton Hall		–		–	18	–	11	.621
UNC Wilmington		–		–	16	–	10	.615
Portland State		–		–	16	–	10	.615
Iona		–		–	15	–	10	.600
Dayton		–		–	16	–	11	.593
Fairfield		–		–	16	–	11	.593
Georgia Southern		–		–	16	–	11	.593
Richmond		–		–	15	–	11	.577
Saint Francis (PA)		–		–	15	–	11	.577
DePaul		–		–	15	–	12	.556
Northeast Louisiana		–		–	15	–	12	.556
Stetson		–		–	15	–	12	.556
Utah State		–		–	15	–	12	.556
Colgate		–		–	13	–	11	.542
Navy		–		–	13	–	11	.542
Oklahoma City		–		–	14	–	12	.538
South Carolina		–		–	14	–	12	.538
Valparaiso		–		–	13	–	12	.520
Catholic		–		–	13	–	13	.500
Fairleigh Dickinson		–		–	13	–	13	.500
Loyola (IL)		–		–	13	–	13	.500
Maine		–		–	13	–	13	.500
Niagara		–		–	13	–	13	.500
Rhode Island		–		–	13	–	13	.500
Saint Peter's		–		–	13	–	13	.500
VCU		–		–	13	–	13	.500
Butler		–		–	13	–	14	.481
Manhattan		–		–	13	–	14	.481
New Hampshire		–		–	12	–	14	.462
Northeastern		–		–	12	–	14	.462
St. Francis (NY)		–		–	12	–	14	.462
Air Force		–		–	12	–	15	.444
Denver		–		–	12	–	15	.444
Southern Mississippi		–		–	11	–	16	.407
Siena		–		–	9	–	15	.375
Cleveland State		–		–	10	–	17	.370
Xavier		–		–	10	–	17	.370
Centenary (LA)		–		–	11	–	19	.367
Long Island		–		–	9	–	16	.360
Hawaii		–		–	9	–	18	.333
Western Carolina		–		–	8	–	16	.333
Vermont		–		–	8	–	17	.320
Boston College		–		–	8	–	18	.308
Baptist		–		–	8	–	19	.296
Marshall		–		–	8	–	19	.296
Boston University		–		–	7	–	19	.269
Robert Morris		–		–	7	–	19	.269
Samford		–		–	7	–	19	.269
Mercer		–		–	6	–	19	.240
Hardin–Simmons		–		–	6	–	21	.222
Houston Baptist		–		–	6	–	23	.207
Buffalo		–		–	5	–	21	.192
Fordham		–		–	5	–	21	.192
Wagner		–		–	3	–	21	.125
Canisius		–		–	3	–	22	.120
Rankings from AP Poll

The 1976–77 Detroit Titans men's basketball team represented the University of Detroit in the 1976–77 NCAA Division I men's basketball season. The team played at Calihan Hall in Detroit.

The Titans were led by head coach Dick Vitale, a former assistant coach at Rutgers University, who came to Detroit in 1973. He had quick success at UD, finishing 25-4 in his first season (1973–74), and began to recruit talent to his rising program, bringing guard Dennis Boyd, guard John Long, forward Terry Tyler and guard Terry Duerod to the Titans program, all of whom would eventually play in the NBA.

The 1976-77 team featured a 21-game Titans winning streak, starting on December 6, 1976, with a 113–45 win over Oakland University, and the streak featured a win over #8 Arizona 70–68, winning on a Boyd shot as time expired, a road victory, 99–94 over Michigan State in East Lansing, and entered the rankings at No. 19, winning over St. Bonaventure 78–62 on February 9, 1977. Gaining national attention, the highlight of the season came on February 16, 1977, as #15 Detroit went on the road to then No. 6 and eventual national champion Marquette. Boyd again performed the last second heroics, as he took the jump shot with two seconds remaining, scoring and giving Detroit a historic 64–63 victory.

The Titans would finish the regular season 24-3 and received a bid to the 1977 NCAA Division I Basketball Tournament. Detroit defeated Middle Tennessee in the opening round, with a double-double of 29 points and 15 rebounds from Terry Tyler, and would then lose to the Michigan Wolverines 86–81 in the regional semi-finals. The Titans finished with a stellar record of 25–4 and a final # 12 ranking on the season. (A December 1976 loss against Minnesota was subsequently turned into a win, when Minnesota forfeited the game, thus the official record is 26–3 and not 25–4). On the season, Tyler averaged a double-double of 17.4 ppg, 11.0 rpg, Long paced the team's scoring with 20.3 ppg, Duerod contributed 11.3 ppg, Boyd, 10.3 ppg, and forward Ron Bostick added 7.1 ppg.

Vitale would be promoted to athletic director at the university after the season and would leave to coach the Detroit Pistons in the NBA in 1978. Smokey Gaines replaced him as head coach for 1977–78 season and led Detroit to a stellar 25–4 record and a #18 ranking with Tyler, Duerod, and Long leading the team, but were denied an NCAA bid and played in the 1978 NIT. The Titans would return to the 1979 NCAA Division I Basketball Tournament, with Duerod and future NBA center Earl Cureton leading the Titans. Detroit lost to Lamar 95–87 in the first round. Detroit finished ranked No. 20 on the season.

With the Pistons, Vitale drafted Long and Tyler in the 1978 NBA draft, Duerod in the 1979 NBA draft and would add Boyd as a free agent in 1978 after he was drafted by the New Orleans Jazz in the 1977 NBA draft. Tyler and Long had extensive careers in the NBA and Duerod won a championship playing for the 1980-81 Boston Celtics. Vitale would be fired by the Pistons and become a prominent college basketball announcer. At a team reunion, Vitale said, ""The stories get bigger and better. If you had an opportunity to see these guys play, you were in for an incredible thrill. They were special," adding "We had the Motor City in the palm of our hand. They were rocking and rolling. I'm so proud to say I had the golden opportunity to be your coach."

Vitale was inducted in the University of Detroit Athletics Hall of Fame in 1993 alongside Terry Duerod. Terry Tyler and John Long were honored together in 2001.

== Roster ==
1976–77 Detroit Titans men's basketball team
Players
Coaches

Pos.	#	Name	Height	Weight	Year	Hometown
F		John Long	6 ft 5 in (1.96 m)	—	Jr
C		Terry Tyler	6 ft 7 in (2.01 m)	—	Jr
G		Terry Duerod	6 ft 1 in (1.85 m)	—	So	Royal Oak, Michigan
G		Dennis Boyd	6 ft 1 in (1.85 m)	—	Sr
F		Ron Bostick	6 ft 9 in (2.06 m)	—	Sr
F		Jeff Whitlow	6 ft 6 in (1.98 m)	—	So
G		Turono Anderson	6 ft 3 in (1.91 m)	—	Jr
G		Wilbert McCormick	6 ft 0 in (1.83 m)	—	Fr
G		Dave Niles	6 ft 5 in (1.96 m)	—	Fr
C		Keith Jackson	6 ft 9 in (2.06 m)	—	Jr
F		Wilbur Ross	6 ft 5 in (1.96 m)	—	Sr
F		Kevin Kaseta	6 ft 9 in (2.06 m)	—	Jr
G		Mike Robinson	6 ft 5 in (1.96 m)	—
F		Rich McDermott	6 ft 2 in (1.88 m)	—

Head coach

- Dick Vitale (Seton Hall)

Assistant coach(es)

Legend

- (C) Team captain
- (S) Suspended
- (I) Ineligible
- (W) Walk-on
- Injured
- Current redshirt

Roster
