= Milo Quaife =

American historian (1880–1959)

Milo Milton Quaife (1880–1959) was an American writer who was a historian of Michigan and the Great Lakes region.

== Early life and education ==
Quaife was born in Nashua, Iowa. He received his education at Grinnell College (Grinnell, Iowa), the University of Missouri (Columbia, Missouri) and the University of Chicago.

== Career ==
He was head of the Wisconsin Historical Society and later secretary-editor at the Detroit Public Library's Burton Collection. Quaife was also a lecturer in Detroit at Wayne State University and the University of Detroit (now a part of the University of Detroit Mercy). He served as editor of the Lakeside Classics historical series from 1916 to 1957.

== See also ==
- List of Grinnell College alumni
- List of historians
- List of people from Detroit
- List of people from Iowa
- List of people from Wisconsin
- List of University of Detroit Mercy people
- List of University of Chicago people
- List of University of Missouri alumni
- List of Wayne State University people
