= Dinkins =

Dinkins is a comparatively rare surname. There are varying accounts as to the origin and early history of the Dinkins family. Leading researchers disagree as to whether the family is a variant of the Irish name "Duncan" from the Gaelic "Ó Duinnchinn". This particular theory seems unlikely as Irish settlers were most often Catholic while the early Dinkins family were staunchly Protestant. The more commonly accepted history of the name explains it as descending from "Dene", the Old English root word for the English name "Dean", which means "small valley, a home site". This theory holds that the family originated in Wales circa 1500 and moved into the lowlands of Scotland and then on to Londonderry in the north of Ireland. The ending "-kins" on a name would indicate "son of" and would make the name "Denekin". Dinkins would then be the Americanized form of the name.

== Early history ==
The earliest members of the Dinkins family to appear in British America in public records lived in the south of Virginia in the late 17th century, long before the immigration of the fabled Dinkins brothers and cousins to Charleston, South Carolina in 1717.

Civil War veteran and Ku Klux Klan member James Dinkins, who served in both the 18th Mississippi Infantry and the 18th Mississippi Cavalry, authored several articles and novels on his wartime experiences, to include his book 1861 to 1865: Personal Recollections & Experiences in the Confederate Army, which was published in 1897. He also authored Geneological: The Dinkins and Spring Families [sic], published in New Orleans in 1908, which prominently features the symbol and motto of the KKK on its cover page. In his writings he states that the Dinkins family came to America circa 1717 from Ireland. The original settlers included three brothers, James, John and Samuel and two cousins, Thomas and Joshua who landed in Charleston, South Carolina. Tradition holds that these three brothers of welsh descent joined with the Armstrong family in Ireland in rebellion against the King. The men were known as the "Devil's in the Bush" being outlaws fighting because of discontentment over the crowns restrictions on their hunting privileges making it difficult to sustain their families. Along with members of the Armstrong family, the brothers fled Ireland in favor of America where the families intermarried.

== List ==
People with this name include:

- Brittanny Dinkins (born 1994), American basketball player
- Byron Dinkins (born 1967), American basketball player
- Carol E. Dinkins (born 1945), American attorney
- Chris Dinkins, American politician
- Darnell Dinkins (born 1977), American football player who played tight end
- David Dinkins (1927–2020), American politician; former mayor of New York City
- Dudley H. Dinkins (1921–2010), American businessman and entrepreneur
- Grace-Ann Dinkins (born 1966), American athlete who represented Liberia at the 1984, 1996 and 2000 Summer Olympics
- Joyce Dinkins (1930–2020), first lady of New York City, wife of David Dinkins
- Howard Dinkins (born 1969), NFL football player who played linebacker
- Jackie Dinkins (1950–1983), NBA basketball player
- James Dinkins (1845–1939) American Civil War veteran
- James Dinkins (born 1966), American law enforcement officer and business executive
- Khalil Dinkins (born 2002), American football player who plays as a tight end
- Pauline E. Dinkins (1891–1961), American physician
- Stephanie Dinkins (born 1964), American artist

== See also ==
- Dinkins, Texas
