= UDCA =

UDCA may refer to

- The University District Community Association of University District, Detroit
- Union de Defense Commercants et Artisans, a French political organization
- Ursodeoxycholic acid
- Upside Down Count and Attitude, a signaling convention in the card game bridge
