= Trafeli =

Trafeli is an Italian surname.

== Geographical distribution ==
As of 2014, 94.7% of all known bearers of the surname Trafeli were residents of Italy (frequency 1:179,808) and 4.5% of the United States (1:22,578,205).

In Italy, the frequency of the surname was higher than national average (1:179,808) only in one region: Tuscany (1:11,688).

== People ==
- Mario Trafeli (1928–2022), American speed skater
