= Dennis Boyd =

Dennis Boyd may refer to:

- Dennis Boyd (American football) (born 1955), NFL player from 1977 to 1982
- Dennis Boyd (basketball) (born 1954), American basketball player
- Dennis Boyd (rugby league), British rugby league footballer in 1978 Kangaroo tour of Great Britain and France
- Oil Can Boyd (Dennis Ray Boyd, born 1959), Major League Baseball pitcher

== See also ==
- Denis Boyd (1891–1965), Royal Navy officer
