= John McNichols =

John McNichols may refer to:

- John P. McNichols, president of University of Detroit
- John J. McNichols, member of the Illinois House of Representatives
