= Detroit Collaborative Design Center =

Coordinates: 42°25′0.98″N 83°8′23.54″W

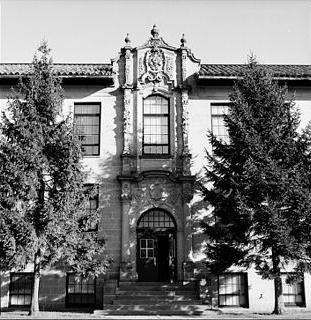
- Warren Loranger Architecture Building; University of Detroit Mercy
- Abbreviation: DCDC
- Established: 1994; 32 years ago
- Type: Non-profit; fee & grant support
- Purpose: Metro Detroit renewal
- Headquarters: University of Detroit Mercy
- Location(s): 4001 W. McNichols Rd. Detroit, Michigan, USA
- First director: Terrence Curry
- Director: Christina Heximer (since 2019)
- Affiliations: Jesuits, Sisters of Mercy
- Staff: Six and one to three interns
- Awards: Focus Hope, 2015; NCARB Prize, 2009
- Website: DCDC-UDM

Detroit Collaborative Design Center is an outreach of University of Detroit Mercy School of Architecture in response to the decline of Detroit, Michigan, with changes in the auto industry. It uses participatory community design to enhance the appearance and functionality of residential, business, and recreational areas as well as community centers, schools, and streetscapes.

== History ==
In 1993, Stephen Vogel envisioned Neighborhood Design Studio within the Detroit Mercy School of Architecture, of which he was dean, to enhance the abilities of local leaders to produce quality design through broad-based community participation. He enlisted Terrence Curry from the faculty to establish the studio. Students assisted in bringing together stakeholders and expertise for planning: housing, mixed-use, retail, streetscapes, emergency shelters. Over time, the studio evolved into the Detroit Collaborative Design Center.

In 2017, the Institute won the American Institute of Architects Whitney M. Young Jr. Award.
