= Tim Burns (Michigan politician) =

American politician (born 1973)

Timothy J. Burns (born 1973) is a former Democratic Oakland County Commissioner for the 19th District, which covers parts of Clawson and Troy.

== Biography ==
Burns is a graduate of Bradley University and the University of Detroit Law School. He is married to his wife, Barbara, and resides in Clawson, where he has been very involved in his community. He is the President of the Troy Community Coalition for the Prevention of Alcohol & Drug Abuse, and also is a member of the Board of Directors for the Clawson Chamber of Commerce and the Clawson Community Credit Union. Burns is also a member of the Troy Jaycees and the Vice President of the Clawson-Troy Optimist Club.

== County Commissioner ==
In 2006, Burns was elected to the County Commission, defeating Republican former Troy Mayor Matt Pryor. This was considered an upset victory, as this is traditionally a Republican seat. Burns, however, benefited from a large ground campaign and the endorsement of former Troy Mayor Jeanne Stine, a Republican.

In the County Commission, Burns's principal issues include preventing urban sprawl, limiting government bureaucracy, and providing county services without raising taxes.

In 2008, Burns was unopposed and won the Democratic primary, and defeated Republican opponent Mike Bosnic, president of the Clawson School Board, for reelection on November 4, 2008.

In 2010 Burns lost his seat on the Oakland County Commission to Republican Mike Bosnic.
