= Pat Heenan =

American football player (1938–2018)

No. 80
- Position: Cornerback

Personal information
- Born: March 1, 1938; Detroit, Michigan, U.S.
- Died: April 19, 2018 (aged 80); Lenoir City, Tennessee, U.S.
- Listed height: 6 ft 2 in (1.88 m)
- Listed weight: 191 lb (87 kg)

Career information
- High school: University of Detroit Jesuit (MI)
- College: Notre Dame

Career history
- Washington Redskins (1960)

Career statistics
- Games played: 12
- Stats at Pro Football Reference

Patrick Dennis Heenan (March 1, 1938 – April 19, 2018) was an American football cornerback in the National Football League for the Washington Redskins and the Baltimore Colts. He played college football at the University of Notre Dame. He became one of the only players to begin their collegiate career in the "interhall" league, that is the intramural tackle football league at the University of Notre Dame, and end their career in the NFL.
