= Whiterosemoxie =

American musical artist (born 2002)

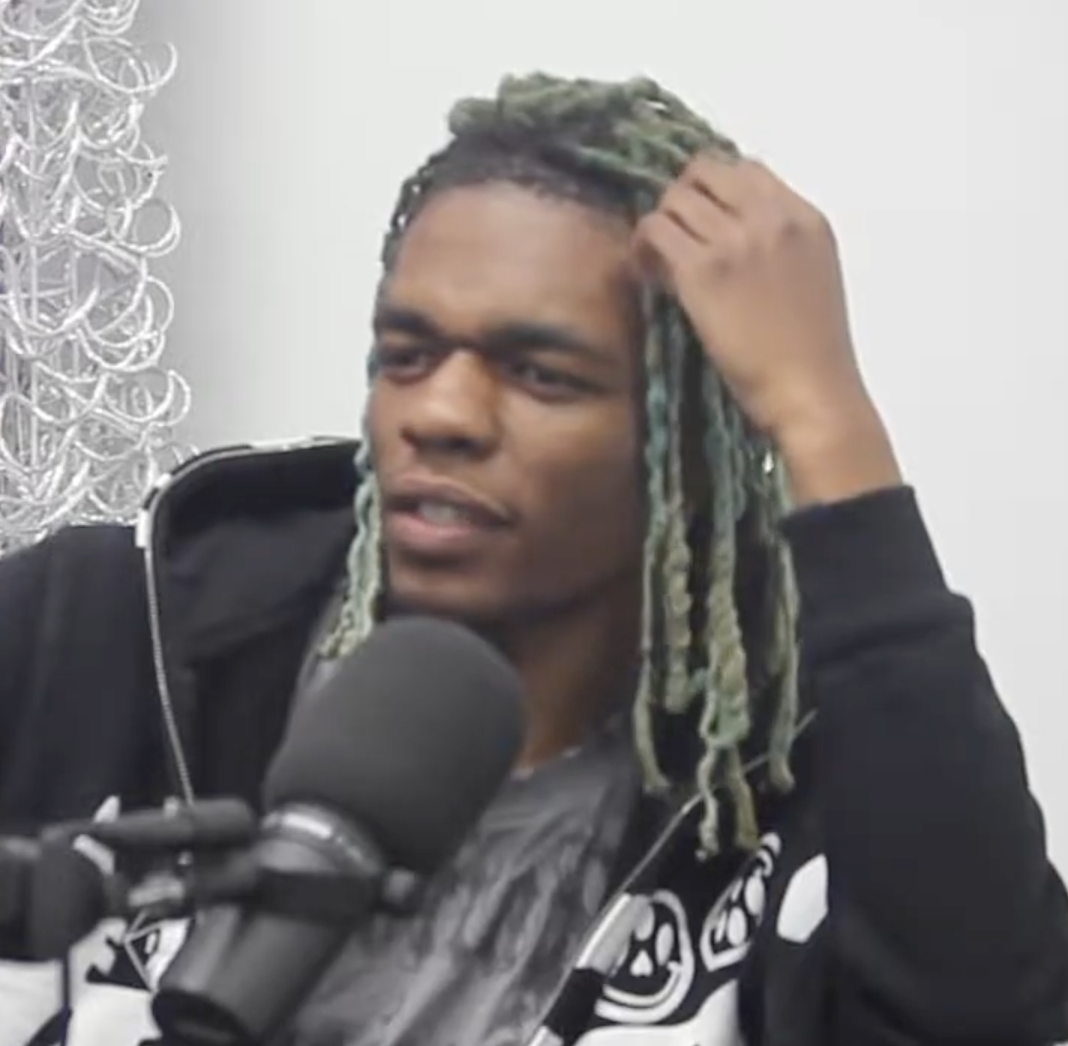
- Whiterosemoxie in 2022

Background information
- Also known as: Moxie; RJ Hardamon
- Born: Roderick Akelo Hardamon; March 29, 2002 (age 24); Brooklyn, New York, U.S.
- Genres: Hip-hop; rage; pop rap
- Occupations: Rapper; singer; songwriter
- Years active: 2019–present
- Labels: 300 Entertainment; Assemble Sound; Good to See You Records; Seragodda LLC; Maykausegnawsea

Roderick Akelo Hardamon (born March 29, 2002), known professionally as Whiterosemoxie, is an American rapper, singer, and songwriter from Brooklyn, New York. He first rose to fame with his single "Whitegold", and later released his debut album, White Ceilings.

== Personal life ==
Hardamon was born on March 29, 2002, to a religious family in Brooklyn, New York, and later relocated to Detroit, Michigan, where he spent most of his childhood. At the age of eight, he suffered an asthma attack, which left him in a coma for several days. Hardamon attended University of Detroit Jesuit High School.

== Career ==
Hardamon's career first began at the age of eight, following his asthma attack. But he wouldn't begin to release his music until he was in high school, when he would record off YouTube beats in his basement. In his senior year of high school, he signed his first deal with the record label Assemble Sound. During this time, Hardamon released his debut song, titled "Whitegold", which has served as one of his most-streamed singles as of yet. After graduating high school, Hardamon moved out of his parents' house and began to record music full-time.

On March 11, 2020, Hardamon was scheduled to perform at the Mo Pop Festival, though it was cancelled due to the COVID-19 pandemic. On March 27, he released his debut studio album, titled White Ceilings. In November of the same year, he released his second album, titled Grae Ceilings. In 2021, Hardamon released the album Trojan with features from Kato on The Track, Tom The Mail Man, and Midwxst. In 2022, he released the album Habits, which featured BigBabyGucci and Daboat. In 2023, he released the album Fatal Romantic. Entering 2024, he released the album All My Sins and its deluxe edition in July of that year. In 2025, he released the album Butterflies. Entering 2026, he released the deluxe edition of his previous album, titled Butterflies (Liddell); both were released as a collaboration album with Jareix.

== Musical style ==
Hardamon cites his influences as Juice Wrld, Travis Scott, and Kanye West. Growing up, Hardamon listened to artists such as Panic! At the Disco, Bon Iver, Fun., Queen, Paramore, and Tame Impala, among others. Musically, he helped contribute to the "New Detroit Wave" sound, a niche genre which incorporates established Detroit hip-hop styles with a rage and electronic bent. Hardamon also specializes in making melodic music. Hardamon enjoys listening to rock music and music from the Chicago scene.

== Discography ==
=== Albums ===
| Title | Album details |
|---|---|
| White Ceilings | Released: March 7, 2020; Label: Assemble Sound, 300 Entertainment; Format: Digital download, streaming |
| Grae Ceilings | Released: September 25, 2020; Label: Assemble Sound, 300 Entertainment; Format: Digital download, streaming |
| Trojan | Released: September 17, 2021; Label: Assemble Sound, 300 Entertainment; Format: Digital download, streaming |
| Habits | Released: October 7, 2022; Label: Assemble Sound, 300 Entertainment; Format: Digital download, streaming |
| Fatal Romantic | Released: November 22, 2023; Label: Seragodda; Format: Digital download, streaming |
| All My Sins | Released: June 7, 2024; Label: Self-released; Format: Digital download, streaming |
| All My Sins (Extended) | Released: July 11, 2024; Label: Self-released; Format: Digital download, streaming |
| Butterflies | Released: November 14, 2025; Label: Self-released; Format: Digital download, streaming |
| Butterflies (Liddell) | Released: January 30, 2026; Label: Self-released; Format: Digital download, streaming |

=== EPs ===
| Title | EP details |
|---|---|
| Two Tone | Released: May 17, 2019; Label: 300 Entertainment; Format: Digital download, streaming |
