= Allison Payne =

American journalist (1964–2021)

- Born: February 12, 1964; Richmond, Virginia, U.S.
- Died: September 1, 2021 (aged 57); Detroit, Michigan, U.S.
- Education: University of Detroit Mercy (BA); Bowling Green State University
- Occupation: News anchor at WGN-TV
- Years active: 1988–2021

Allison Payne (February 12, 1964 – September 1, 2021) was a nine-time Emmy Award winner, a 21-year anchorwoman with WGN-TV, a veteran international journalist, a popular public speaker, and an actively involved community builder. She was a longtime anchor and reporter at CW affiliate and cable superstation WGN-TV in Chicago, Illinois. Payne served as co-anchor of the WGN Midday News from 11 a.m.-1 p.m.

Payne also launched Payne Productions, Incorporated, a television production company which served to help students interested in the broadcasting business. Payne remained active in broadcasting via freelance work until her death.

== Background ==
Payne was born in Richmond, Virginia, to Dana and Kathryn Payne. When she was five, her parents moved north to Detroit, Michigan, where Payne attended St. Rita's Catholic grade school. She was a graduate of Renaissance High School in Detroit and held a B.A. in Liberal Arts from the University of Detroit Mercy. Payne attended Bowling Green State University in Ohio for her master's degree in radio/TV/film. Payne was a member of Delta Sigma Theta sorority.

== Career ==
=== WGN anchor ===
Payne began in television news as an intern at ABC affiliate WNWO (channel 24, now an NBC affiliate) in Toledo, Ohio, within months was promoted to main anchor of the station's late evening newscast. Payne later moved to NBC affiliate WNEM-TV (channel 5, now a CBS affiliate) in Saginaw, Michigan, as the co-anchor of the 6 and 11 p.m. newscast.

She moved to Chicago in 1990 to anchor the station's primetime 9 p.m. newscast, which she anchored until 2009. From 1993 to 2008 in the evening and since 2009 at midday, Payne was paired alongside Steve Sanders at the anchor desk.

Payne traveled to Kenya to trace Barack Obama's roots, and to the Middle East to cover the Reverend Jesse Jackson's peace negotiations between Israel and Lebanon.

During her tenure with WGN, Payne has won numerous awards including nine Emmys for reporting, including:

- Outstanding Achievement within a Regularly Scheduled News Program – Specialty Report/Series — Politics/Government: Jackson & Jackson: Allison Payne, Reporter; Pam Grimes, Producer. WGN
- Outstanding Achievement for Individual Excellence On Camera: Programming – Program — Host/Moderator/Contributor: Allison Payne – People to People. WGN
- Outstanding Achievement within a Regularly Scheduled News Program – Specialty Report: — Religion: Blue Eyes, Black Soul: Allison Payne, Reporter; Pam Grimes, Michael D’Angelo, Producers. WGN
- Outstanding Achievement for Informational Programs – Public Affairs/Current Affairs: People to People: Gloria Brown, Producer; Allison Payne, Steve Sanders, Hosts. WGN
- Outstanding Achievement for Individual Excellence On Camera: News – Reporter: Allison Payne – Composite. WGN

On August 2, 2011, Payne and WGN-TV station management agreed to a buyout of Payne's current contract, ending her 21-year relationship with the station; she left WGN-TV in September 2011.

Regarding her future after WGN, The Chicago Sun-Times reported: "I hope to continue working in broadcasting in some capacity and will consider other professional opportunities," Payne said. "I also fully intend to continue my work in the community here." On her blog on August 4, 2011, Payne added: "Down the road, I plan to begin producing my own documentaries. I also plan to produce occasional reports which I will share with you on this website. I am not ruling out a return to the anchor desk, but for now I need new intellectual challenges. I’m open to applying my communication skills to the business world as well."

=== Health issues and death ===
In January and August 2008, Payne went on medical leave after suffering from a series of mini-strokes. In November 2008 WGN-TV announced that Payne would take an indefinite leave of absence because of ongoing health issues. Payne admitted in an interview with Chicago Tribune media columnist Phil Rosenthal that she sought treatment for depression during her absence months earlier.

In January 2010, Payne publicly acknowledged that she was a recovering alcoholic, after having previously battled alcoholism for 20 years. “Substance abuse can become a problem," she said at the time. "I wanted to make sure that nothing in my life got out of hand.”

In late December 2010, Payne took a leave of absence from WGN-TV to rest her vocal cords. Greg Caputo, news director at WGN-TV, told TimeOut Chicago columnist Robert Feder in an interview that “she was diagnosed a few months ago and tried to tough it out . . . (but) her doctor wants her to stay off the air till they can fix the problem.”

Payne died on September 1, 2021, in Detroit at the age of 57.
