= Matt Pryor (politician) =

American politician (1960–2023)

Matthew "Matt" Pryor (March 17, 1960 - June 25, 2023) was an American Republican Party politician. He was the mayor of the city of Troy in the U.S. state of Michigan from 2001 to 2004.

== Biography ==
Pryor grew up in Troy, graduating from Troy High School in 1978. In 1982 he received his B.S. in psychology from the University of Michigan. Upon graduation from college, Pryor began operating a landscape and construction company in Troy and the surrounding area. Pryor married Patti Turri on August 13, 2011.

Pryor also has been a noted co-host on Deepertruth Radio with Donald Hartley, known as the "Catholic Defender".

Pryor died on June 25, 2023.

== Political career ==
=== City council ===
In 1993, Pryor was elected to the Troy City Council. He served on the council until 1999, including two years as Mayor pro-tem.

=== Mayor of Troy ===
In 2001, he was elected Mayor of Troy.

In his 2004 re-election bid he was defeated by former councilmember Louise Schilling.

=== County commissioner ===
In 2006 Pryor won the Republican primary for an Oakland County Commissioner representing a large portion of Troy and Clawson. He lost in a surprise defeat to Democrat Tim Burns in the November election. This portion of Oakland county traditionally votes Republican.

=== State representative ===
Pryor is running for State Representative, with the Republican Primary on August 7, 2012.
