= Richard F. Abel =

United States Air Force general (1933–2022)

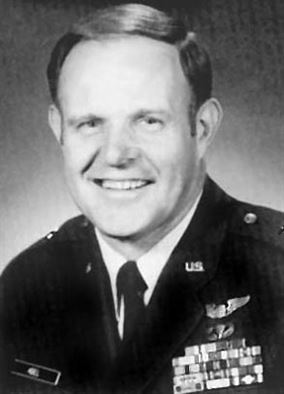
- Born: 1933
- Died: August 31, 2022 (aged 88–89)
- Burial place: Arlington National Cemetery
- Military career
- Allegiance: United States
- Branch: United States Air Force
- Service years: 1956–1985
- Rank: Brigadier General
- Unit: Seventh Air Force
- Awards: Defense Superior Service Medal, Bronze Star Medal, Meritorious Service Medal with oak leaf cluster, Joint Service Commendation Medal
- Other work: Christian Missionary

Richard F. Abel (1933 – August 31, 2022) was a brigadier general in the United States Air Force.

== Biography ==
Abel was born in Akron, Ohio, in 1933. He graduated from Saint Ignatius High School in Cleveland, Ohio, in 1951. In 1956, Abel graduated from the University of Detroit and later attended Boston University.

Abel has served as Vice Chairman of the national board of directors of the Fellowship of Christian Athletes and was a member of the Order of Daedalians.

== Career ==
Abel received his commission in 1956. The following year, he obtained his pilot wings at Laredo Air Force Base and was assigned to Lackland Air Force Base. While there, he served as a training officer, academic instructor and aide-de-camp to Robert M. Stillman. In 1962, he completed Squadron Officer School and was assigned to Williams Air Force Base.

From 1963 to 1968, Abel was stationed at the United States Air Force Academy. He served in multiple positions in public affairs and communications. During this time, he was also an assistant coach with the Air Force Falcons football team.

In 1968, Abel was assigned to the Seventh Air Force, leading the combat news division during the Vietnam War. The following year, he became a public affairs officer for the commander in chief of the United States Pacific Command. In 1972, he returned to the Air Force Academy to serve as director of the Admissions Liaisons Office.

Abel was sent to assist with Operation Homecoming in 1973. He served as a public affairs officer escorting prisoners back to the United States after being released from prison camps. From 1975 to 1978, Abel was again assigned to the United States Pacific Command, this time as director of public affairs. Afterwards, he served as special assistant to the Chairman of the Joint Chiefs of Staff. In 1980, Abel became director of public affairs of the Office of the United States Secretary of the Air Force. He retired in 1985.

Awards he received during his career include the Defense Superior Service Medal, the Bronze Star Medal, the Defense Meritorious Service Medal, the Meritorious Service Medal with oak leaf cluster, the Joint Service Commendation Medal with oak leaf cluster and the Air Force Commendation Medal.

After he retired from the United States Air Force, Abel was a Christian missionary. He died on August 31, 2022.
