= University District, Detroit =

Neighborhood in Detroit, Michigan, United States

Coordinates: 42.424°N 83.137°W

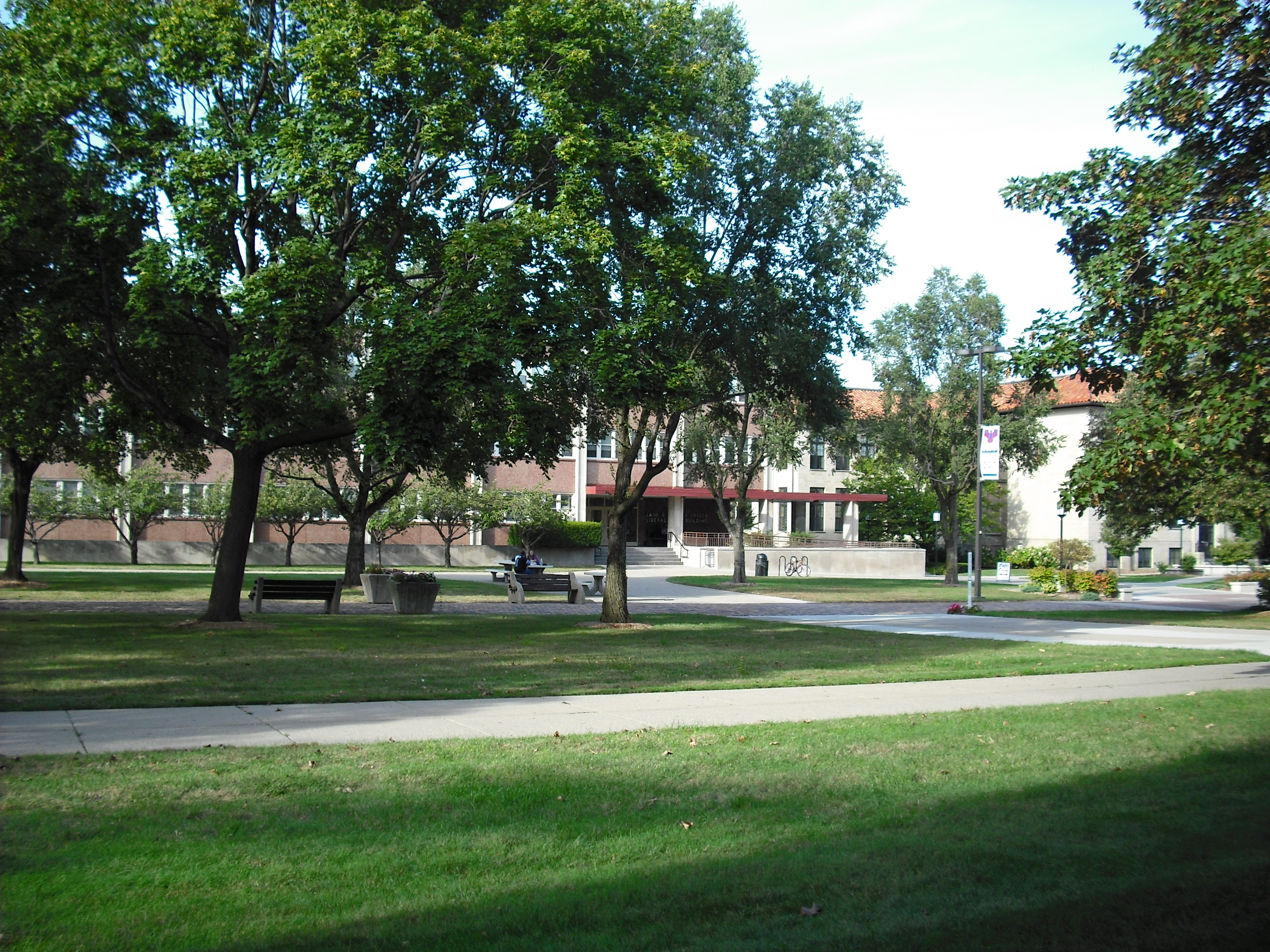
University of Detroit Mercy campus.

University District is a neighborhood in Detroit, Michigan, United States. Located one mile west of Woodward Avenue, the University District is named for its neighbor to the south, the University of Detroit Mercy (UDM). The neighborhood is bounded on the north by residential Seven Mile Road, on the south by McNichols Road and the UDM campus, and on the east by the Detroit Golf Club and Golf Club Estates. The western boundary is Livernois Avenue: once known to Detroiters as "the Avenue of Fashion", this commercial boulevard of small shops is becoming “Gallery Row,” home to a growing collection of art galleries and art-related businesses.

University District is also seeing a surge in the number of LGBTQ families moving into the neighborhood, which engulfs and relives the history of the district. The University District was the first organized neighborhood in the City of Detroit to recognize, embrace, and support Gay and Lesbian persons, dating back to the 1950s. A number of Gay and Lesbian themed bars and nightclubs were only minutes from the District. During the white flight, LGBTQ residents relocated to nearby Ferndale, MI.

== Architecture ==
The University District's 1,200 single family homes were built mainly during the "golden age of housing" from 1925-1930 and 1937-1941, when construction technology was highly developed, building costs were low, and old world craftsmen were in plentiful supply. The homes reflect a wide variety of styles: English Tudor, Romanesque, Italianate, Spanish Mission, French Provincial, Queen Anne, Georgian, Federalist, Art Moderne, and contemporary. The predominant Tudor style, consistent setbacks, rear-of-lot garages, and mature shade trees provide a coherent design aesthetic that gives the University District its distinctive visual identity. Interior features include intricate plasterwork, leaded or stained glass windows, oak paneled libraries, hand-pegged hardwood floors, one or more fireplaces, Pewabic Pottery tile, and crystal chandeliers. Most homes offer four to six bedrooms, a minimum of three bathrooms, two-car garages, and a fully finished basement that includes a furnace room, laundry room, fitness room and a large family room with wet bar and fireplace. Many of these family rooms have now been converted to home theaters.

The District also includes two small apartment buildings and 80 duplex homes, many of which are occupied by University faculty and graduate students.

Detroit's only Frank Lloyd Wright home, the Dorothy H. Turkel House, sits just outside the District on Seven Mile Road.

== Amenities and cultural resources ==
Amenities in the University District include the Belden Tot Lot and Gesu Community Green and Garden. Nearby are the running track at UDM, Northwest Activities Center, the venerable Detroit Golf Club, and Palmer Park's playing fields, tennis courts, and public golf course. Cultural resources include the UDM Theatre Company in performance at Marygrove College, the Detroit Repertory Theater, and world-renowned Baker's Keyboard Lounge, as well as Sherwood Forest, Lincoln and Parkman Branch Libraries.

== Community organization ==
The University District Community Association consists of 15 elected Board members. UDCA functions include publishing a quarterly newsletter, maintaining a website, sponsoring a volunteer radio patrol and walking tours of the neighborhood, planning social events, snowplowing non-emergency streets, and organizing support for neighborhood schools, community-wide yard sales, and biennial Home and Garden Tours.

Surrounding communities include the Golf Club Estates, Palmer Woods, Green Acres, Sherwood Forest, Bagley Community, and Martin Park. All are part of the 12th Precinct Coalition and University Commons, umbrella organizations that address issues of area-wide interest.

The University District is a Detroit Neighborhood Enterprise Zone (NEZ), entitling home buyers to reduced property taxes for up to 15 years.

== History ==
The area now called the University District was originally farmland in the survey township of Greenfield, Michigan, organized by its residents in 1833 and named for its prosperous farms. A typical title abstract in the neighborhood shows a first sale by the "United States of America, Martin Van Buren, President", on April 1, 1837. The University District was annexed to the City of Detroit in the election of November 7, 1916. In November 1920, John P. McNichols, S.J., the newly appointed president of the University of Detroit, traveled with armed companions from the campus on Jefferson Avenue in downtown Detroit to Six Mile Road (then known as Palmer Boulevard, now called McNichols Road). He carried a satchel supposedly containing $120,000 in cash (it contained sliced newspaper—the cash was in his overcoat) to purchase the farm that is now the Main Campus of the University of Detroit Mercy. Four months later, 33 building lots along Livernois north of Palmer were sold in a three-day period. Gesu Catholic Church was soon established despite proximity to the Seven Mile and Livernois area. For several decades, the southwest quadrant of the University District was home to large Catholic families, including that of Detroit Mayor Jerome Cavanagh.

In the 1920s and 1930s, the first homeowners were primarily realtors, senior partners in law firms and insurance agencies, or the owners and managers of prosperous Detroit businesses. Notable residents have included business owners such as Stanley Winkleman of the Detroit department store chain bearing his name, and musicians from the Detroit Symphony Orchestra. Concertmaster Mischa Mischakoff entertained visiting conductors and soloists at his University District home. The visiting musicians autographed the wallpaper in the foyer, which remained until 2015. The paper began to deteriorate and was professionally removed and preserved. Half of the paper was donated to the DSO archives and the other half was donated to the Burton Historical Collection at the Detroit Public Library.

Fairfield Street was often called Orchestra Row. A number of symphony musicians lived in the homes between Clarita and Margarita and their repair and maintenance staff lived nearby as well.

African-American families began moving into the University District in the 1960s, depicted on stage in Palmer Park, a play by Joanna Glass, who lived in the neighborhood during that time.

== Education ==
University District is within the Detroit Public Schools district. Residents are zoned to Palmer Park Preparatory Academy for K-8, while residents are zoned to Mumford High School for high school.

== See also ==
- University–Cultural Center Multiple Resource Area
- Woodward Avenue
