= Guy Sparrow (basketball) =

American basketball player (born 1932)

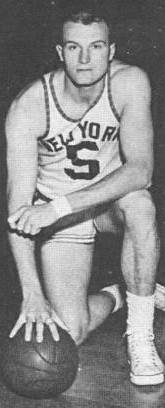

Personal information
- Born: November 2, 1932 (age 94) Pontiac, Michigan, U.S.
- Listed height: 6 ft 6 in (1.98 m)
- Listed weight: 218 lb (99 kg)

Career information
- High school: Pontiac (Pontiac, Michigan)
- College: Detroit Mercy (1951–1955)
- NBA draft: 1955: 3rd round, 19th overall pick
- Drafted by: New York Knicks
- Playing career: 1957–1961
- Position: Power forward / small forward
- Number: 5, 16

Career history
- 1957–1959: New York Knicks
- 1959–1960: Philadelphia Warriors
- 1960: Scranton Miners

Career highlights
- All-EPBL Second Team (1960); 2× First-team All-MVC (1954, 1955)

Career NBA statistics
- Points: 1,167 (7.8 ppg)
- Rebounds: 728 (4.9 rpg)
- Assists: 142 (0.9 apg)
- Stats at NBA.com
- Stats at Basketball Reference

Guy Paul Joseph Sparrow (born November 2, 1932), nicknamed "The Bird", is a former American National Basketball Association player. He was drafted in 1955 with the fifth pick in the third round by the New York Knicks. In his first season with the Knicks, Guy averaged 11.1 points and 6.4 rebounds per game. During his second NBA season, Guy was traded to the Philadelphia Warriors for Jack George. In his second season, Guy averaged 5.0 points and 3.6 rebounds per game. In Guy's final NBA season, he averaged 2.7 points per game and 2.1 rebounds a game for the Warriors.

Sparrow played for the Scranton Miners of the Eastern Professional Basketball League (EPBL) during the 1959–60 season and was selected to the All-EPBL Second Team.

== Early life ==
Due to a rheumatic ailment at around age 13, Sparrow's legs were disabled. His parents had to carry him to and from school. He walked on braces when he entered Pontiac High School in Pontiac, Michigan. He was able to recover and play for the basketball team. He later played on the basketball team of the University of Detroit.

== Career statistics ==
Legend
GP	Games played	GS	Games started	MPG	Minutes per game
FG%	Field goal percentage	3P%	3-point field goal percentage	FT%	Free throw percentage
RPG	Rebounds per game	APG	Assists per game	SPG	Steals per game
BPG	Blocks per game	PPG	Points per game	**Bold**	Career high
*	Led the league

=== NBA ===
==== Regular season ====
Year	Team	GP	MPG	FG%	FT%	RPG	APG	PPG
1957–58	New York	**72***	**23.1**	**.379**	**.642**	**6.4**	**1.0**	**11.1**
1958–59	New York	44	13.8	.312	.582	4.3	**1.0**	5.7
1958–59	Philadelphia	23	10.2	.337	.525	2.5	**1.0**	3.8
1959–60	Philadelphia	11	7.3	.311	.250	2.1	.5	2.7
Career		150	17.2	.358	.608	4.9	.9	7.8
