= Bill Ebben =

American basketball player (born 1935)

Personal information
- Born: October 7, 1935 (age 91)
- Listed height: 6 ft 4 in (1.93 m)
- Listed weight: 190 lb (86 kg)

Career information
- High school: Fenwick (Oak Park, Illinois)
- College: Detroit Mercy (1954–1957)
- NBA draft: 1957: 3rd round, 18th overall pick
- Drafted by: Detroit Pistons
- Position: Guard
- Number: 6

Career history
- 1957–1958: Detroit Pistons

Career highlights
- Third team All-American – AP (1957); 2× First-team All-MVC (1956, 1957)
- Stats at NBA.com
- Stats at Basketball Reference

William Edward Ebben (born October 7, 1935) is an American former professional basketball player. Ebben was selected in the 1957 NBA draft (third round, 18th overall) by the Detroit Pistons after a collegiate career at the University of Detroit Mercy. He appeared in eight NBA games in his career and averaged 1.9 points, 1.0 rebounds and 0.5 assists per game. He is the grandfather of swimmer Jack Alexy.

== Career statistics ==
Legend
GP	Games played	GS	Games started	MPG	Minutes per game
FG%	Field goal percentage	3P%	3-point field goal percentage	FT%	Free throw percentage
RPG	Rebounds per game	APG	Assists per game	SPG	Steals per game
BPG	Blocks per game	PPG	Points per game	**Bold**	Career high

=== NBA ===
==== Regular season ====
Year	Team	GP	MPG	FG%	FT%	RPG	APG	PPG
1957–58	Detroit	8	6.3	.214	.750	1.0	.5	1.9

== See also ==
- List of NCAA Division I men's basketball players with 30 or more rebounds in a game
