= James Dinkins =

American law enforcement officer (born 1966)

James A. Dinkins
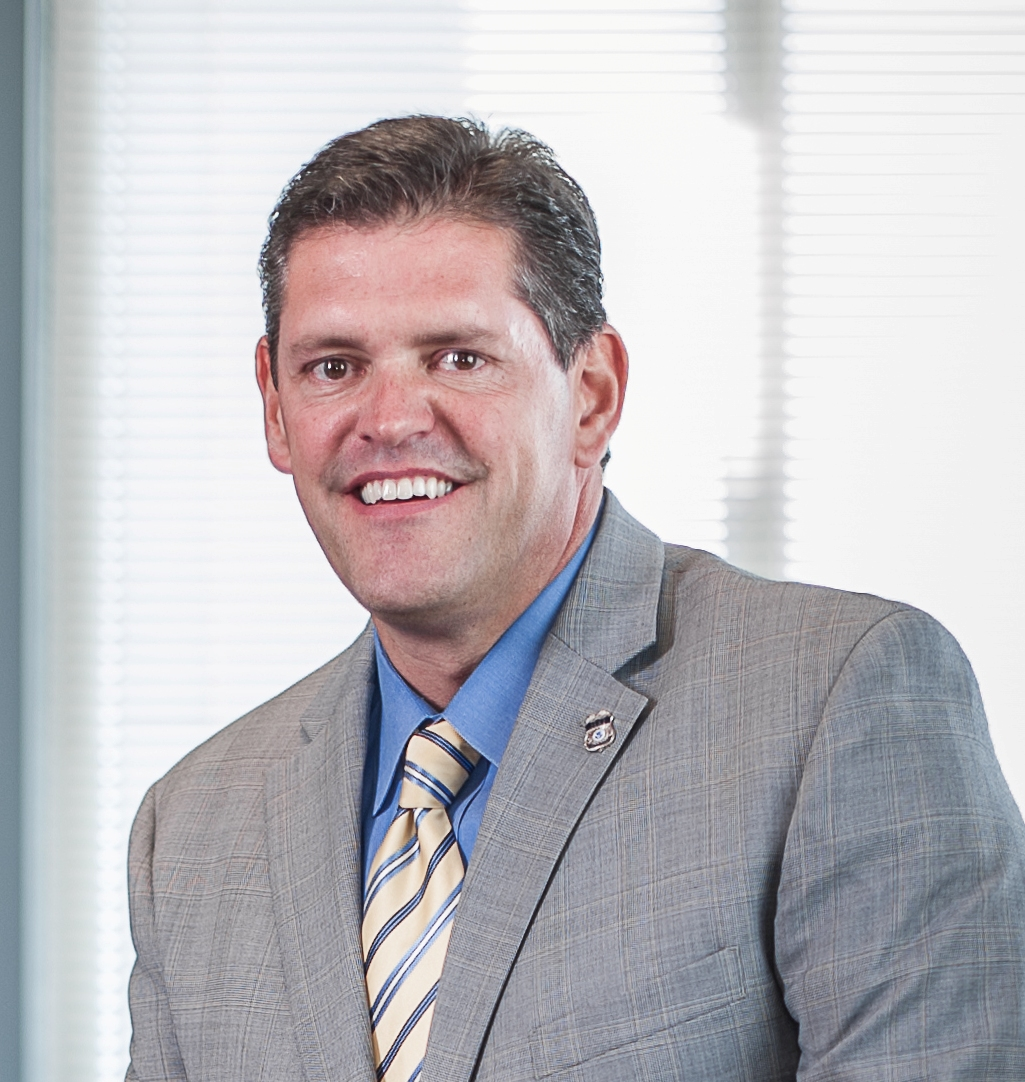

Executive Associate Director of Homeland Security Investigations
- In office June 2010 – April 2014
- President: Barack Obama
- Succeeded by: Peter T. Edge

Personal details
- Born: 1966 (age 59–60) Pontiac, Michigan, U.S.
- Education: University of Detroit (BA)

James A. "Jim" Dinkins (born 1966) is an American law enforcement officer and business executive who served as the first head of Homeland Security Investigations for U.S. Immigration and Customs Enforcement from 2010 to 2014. He is a senior vice president and director of operations of Enterprise Financial Crimes Compliance for U.S. Bancorp.

== Early life and education ==
Dinkins was born in Pontiac, Michigan. He graduated with a bachelor's degree in criminal justice from the University of Detroit in 1988.

== Career ==
=== U.S. Customs and Homeland Security (1986–2010) ===
Dinkins began his career with the federal government in 1986, interning with the US Customs Service as a co-operative education program student. In 1989, he became a special agent at the US Customs San Francisco office responsible for investigating money laundering, drug and weapons smuggling, and cyber crimes. In 1996, he transferred to the Office of the Special Agent in Charge in Detroit, Michigan, where he was promoted to Assistant Special Agent in Charge.

Following the 2002 establishment of the Department of Homeland Security and Immigration and Customs Enforcement (ICE), in 2004, Dinkins was promoted to chief of Cornerstone and Financial Investigation Programs at ICE headquarters, developing initiatives to fight financial crimes in the US. He is one of the creators of the program, which was launched in 2004 as a way for law enforcement to reach out to the financial industry to share strategic information related to financial crimes and money laundering trends. In 2006, he became Special Agent in Charge of the Baltimore field office, and became Special Agent in Charge of the Washington, DC field office in 2008.

=== Head of HSI (2010–2014) ===
In January 2010, Dinkins was promoted to the ICE Director of Investigations, where he established and served as the first executive associate director of Homeland Security Investigations (HSI) when the unit was formed in June 2010 as a new division of the Department of Homeland Security's Immigration and Customs Enforcement. HSI was formed by merging the intelligence, domestic and international investigative divisions of ICE, and is primarily devoted to investigating illegal acts including human, arms and drug trafficking; possession of weapons of mass destruction; money laundering; and cyber crimes. As head of HSI, Dinkins supervised a 9,000+ employee organization with 200 US offices and 72 overseas locations in 47 countries, working under the Obama administration. From 2010 through 2012, HSI achieved a record number of criminal ICE arrests, with successful investigations of commercial fraud, child exploitation, human trafficking and financial crimes.

In 2012, while still serving as head of HSI, Dinkins was selected to chair the World Customs Organization's enforcement committee, which works to represent 179 Customs administrations around the world.

Dinkins served as head of HSI until his retirement from federal law enforcement in April 2014.

=== Later career (2014–present) ===
After nearly three decades with the US federal government, in 2014, Dinkins joined Thomson Reuters Special Services business unit as vice president and general manager, developing tools for government and large businesses to access and analyze information including financial, legal and scientific data.

Beginning in 2015, he served on the American Gaming Association's new Illegal Gambling Advisory Board in Washington, DC, to provide advice on illegal gambling enforcement efforts.

In 2015, Dinkins was named senior vice president and director of operations for Enterprise Financial Crimes Compliance for US Bank. The anti-money laundering division uses data science, investigators, analysts and other experts and technology to monitor, identify and report suspicious money laundering and terrorist financing activity, to help prevent the flow of money to criminal organizations around the world.
