= Terry Tyler =

American basketball player (born 1956)

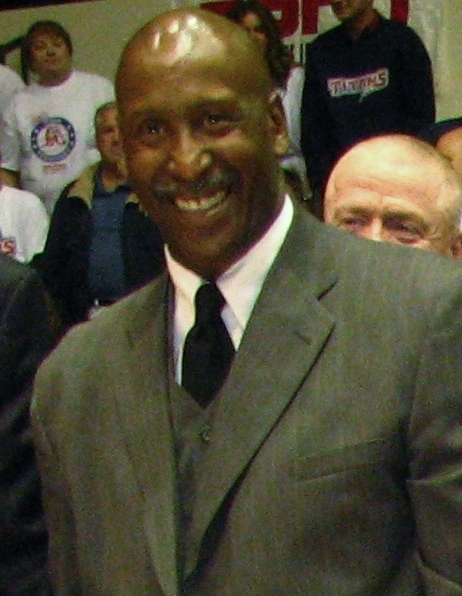
- Tyler in 2011 at the University of Detroit Mercy's 2011 dedication of Dick Vitale Court in Calihan Hall.

Personal information
- Born: October 30, 1956 (age 70) Detroit, Michigan, U.S.
- Listed height: 6 ft 7 in (2.01 m)
- Listed weight: 215 lb (98 kg)

Career information
- High school: Northwestern (Detroit, Michigan)
- College: Detroit Mercy (1974–1978)
- NBA draft: 1978: 2nd round, 23rd overall pick
- Drafted by: Detroit Pistons
- Playing career: 1978–1992
- Position: Small forward
- Number: 41, 40

Career history

Playing
- 1978–1985: Detroit Pistons
- 1985–1988: Sacramento Kings
- 1988–1989: Dallas Mavericks
- 1989–1990: Stefanel Trieste
- 1990–1991: Corona Cremona
- 1991–1992: Rex Udine

Coaching
- 1998–2000: Eastern New Mexico

Career highlights
- NBA All-Rookie First Team (1979); No. 44 retired by Detroit Mercy Titans

Career NBA statistics
- Points: 8,868 (10.2 ppg)
- Rebounds: 4,675 (5.4 rpg)
- Blocks: 1,342 (1.5 bpg)
- Stats at NBA.com
- Stats at Basketball Reference

Terry Christopher Tyler (born October 30, 1956) is an American former professional basketball player.

== Amateur career ==
A 6'7" forward from Northwestern High School, Tyler signed to play for Dick Vitale at the University of Detroit. Tyler averaged a double-double by his sophomore year (17.2 ppg, 11.0 rpg), and the team would produce an unprecedented run during his time with the Titans (1974–1978). Vitale added future NBA players such as Terry Duerod, John Long and Dennis Boyd and built a dominating independent program at the Jesuit university. Tyler played forward for the team, averaged 16.4 ppg and 12.6 rpg as a senior.

UD advanced to the 1977 NCAA Division I Basketball Tournament in his junior year, defeating Middle Tennessee in the first round before losing to Michigan in the Sweet 16 86–81 to end a stellar season, finishing #12 in the polls.

The team was left out of the NCAA in Tyler's senior year, 1977–78, playing in the 1978 NIT, despite a 25–4 record and a #18 ranking. In four seasons at Detroit, Tyler scored 1,649 points, set a school record with 359 blocked shots and was inducted into the Detroit Mercy Titans Hall of Fame in 2001.

== Professional career ==
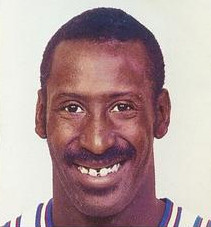
Tyler in 1986

After his college career came to a close, the forward was selected by the Detroit Pistons in the second round of the 1978 NBA draft. The move was largely influenced by Pistons Head Coach Dick Vitale, who coached Tyler at UD before going to the Pistons in 1978. He played seven seasons for the Pistons, and averaged a career-high 13.4 ppg points per game in 1980–81. During his time with the Pistons, Tyler would play alongside University of Detroit teammates Duerod, Boyd and Long. A free agent in 1985, Tyler elected to sign with the Sacramento Kings, spending three seasons with the Kings. Leaving the hometown team was tough and Tyler said, "There were some tough years in Detroit, but I just wanted to make a difference. I wasn't fortunate enough to get a ring but doggone it at least we got it going in the right direction. I wanted the fans to know that when they saw me, I was going to give 110%."

Tyler then finished his NBA career with the Dallas Mavericks for the 1988-89 NBA season. Tyler played 11 seasons (1978–1989) in the NBA in total, averaged 10.2 points and 5.4 rebounds in his NBA career and earned NBA All-Rookie Team honors in 1979. He also participated in the 1986 NBA Slam Dunk Contest, where he finished 8th. Tyler would complete his playing career overseas, playing three seasons in the Lega Basket A in Italy.

== Career statistics ==
Legend
| GP | Games played | GS | Games started | MPG | Minutes per game |
| FG% | Field goal percentage | 3P% | 3-point field goal percentage | FT% | Free throw percentage |
| RPG | Rebounds per game | APG | Assists per game | SPG | Steals per game |
| BPG | Blocks per game | PPG | Points per game | **Bold** | Career high |
| * | Led the league |

=== Regular season ===
| Year | Team | GP | GS | MPG | FG% | 3P% | FT% | RPG | APG | SPG | BPG | PPG |
|---|---|---|---|---|---|---|---|---|---|---|---|---|
| 1978–79 | Detroit | **82*** | — | 31.2 | .482 | — | .658 | **7.9** | 1.1 | 1.3 | 2.5 | 12.9 |
| 1979–80 | Detroit | 82 | — | **32.6** | .465 | .167 | **.765** | 7.6 | 1.6 | 1.3 | **2.7** | 12.3 |
| 1980–81 | Detroit | 82 | — | 31.1 | **.532** | .000 | .592 | 6.9 | 1.7 | **1.4** | 2.2 | **13.4** |
| 1981–82 | Detroit | 82 | 0 | 24.3 | .523 | .250 | .740 | 6.0 | 1.5 | .9 | 2.0 | 9.9 |
| 1982–83 | Detroit | 82 | **56** | 31.0 | .478 | .133 | .745 | 6.6 | **1.9** | 1.3 | 2.0 | 12.1 |
| 1983–84 | Detroit | **82*** | 7 | 19.5 | .453 | .154 | .712 | 3.5 | .9 | .8 | .7 | 8.8 |
| 1984–85 | Detroit | **82*** | 53 | 24.4 | .494 | .000 | .716 | 5.2 | .8 | .6 | 1.1 | 11.6 |
| 1985–86 | Sacramento | 71 | 52 | 23.3 | .455 | .000 | .750 | 4.4 | 1.3 | .9 | 1.5 | 9.5 |
| 1986–87 | Sacramento | **82*** | 48 | 23.5 | .495 | **.333** | .721 | 4.0 | .9 | .7 | 1.0 | 9.3 |
| 1987–88 | Sacramento | 74 | 28 | 16.0 | .452 | .143 | .641 | 3.3 | .8 | .6 | .6 | 5.5 |
| 1988–89 | Dallas | 70 | 11 | 15.1 | .469 | .111 | .758 | 3.0 | .6 | .3 | .6 | 5.5 |
| Career | | 871 | 255 | 25.0 | .484 | .122 | .703 | 5.4 | 1.2 | .9 | 1.5 | 10.2 |

=== Playoffs ===
| Year | Team | GP | GS | MPG | FG% | 3P% | FT% | RPG | APG | SPG | BPG | PPG |
|---|---|---|---|---|---|---|---|---|---|---|---|---|
| 1984 | Detroit | 5 | — | 8.4 | .370 | — | .556 | 1.4 | .2 | .0 | .6 | 5.0 |
| 1985 | Detroit | **9** | 0 | **19.9** | **.490** | .000 | .815 | **4.4** | .3 | .7 | .4 | **13.3** |
| 1986 | Sacramento | 3 | 2 | 17.0 | .200 | — | **1.000** | 2.7 | **1.3** | **.7** | **1.0** | 2.7 |
| Career | | 17 | 2 | 16.0 | .455 | .000 | .775 | 3.2 | .5 | .5 | .6 | 9.0 |

== See also ==
- List of National Basketball Association career blocks leaders
