= Detroit Mercy Titans men's basketball =

Men's college basketball team

2026–27 Detroit Mercy Titans men's basketball team
- University: University of Detroit Mercy
- Head coach: Mark Montgomery (3rd season)
- Location: Detroit, Michigan
- Arena: Calihan Hall (capacity: 8,295)
- Conference: Horizon League
- Nickname: Titans
- Colors: Red, white, and blue

NCAA Division I tournament Sweet Sixteen
- 1977

NCAA Division I tournament appearances
- 1962, 1977, 1979, 1998, 1999, 2012

Conference tournament champions
- 1994, 1999, 2012

Conference regular-season champions
- 1998, 1999

Uniforms
Home	Away

The Detroit Mercy Titans men's basketball team is the college basketball team which represents University of Detroit Mercy in Detroit and competes in NCAA Division I men's basketball as a member of the Horizon League. Traditionally, the Titans have been a fair "mid-major" program, advancing to the Sweet Sixteen in 1977 and to the Round of 32 in 1998 and 1999. The Titans have appeared in the NCAA Tournament six times, most recently in 2012. The Titans are coached by Mark Montgomery, who was hired on April 3, 2024. They play their home games at Calihan Hall on the school's McNichols Campus.

== Season-by-season records ==
- NOTE: The Titans did not field a basketball team in 1907–08 and 1908–09.

Season	Team	Overall record	Pct.	Conf. record	Postseason
Independent
1905–06	Detroit	3–1	.750		
1906–07	Detroit	1–3	.250		
1909–10	Detroit	2–3	.400		
1910–11	Detroit	6–0	1.000		
1911–12	Detroit	6–5	.545		
1912–13	Detroit	13–0	1.000		
1913–14	Detroit	6–3	.667		
1914–15	Detroit	3–5	.375		
1915–16	Detroit	7–3	.700		
1916–17	Detroit	5–4	.556		
1917–18	Detroit	13–5	.722		
1918–19	Detroit	4–5	.444		
1919–20	Detroit	12–7	.632		
1920–21	Detroit	10–8	.556		
1921–22	Detroit	2–13	.133		
1922–23	Detroit	9–7	.563		
1923–24	Detroit	9–8	.529		
1924–25	Detroit	6–6	.500		
1925–26	Detroit	13–6	.684		
1926–27	Detroit	8–9	.471		
1927–28	Detroit	11–4	.733		
1928–29	Detroit	4–11	.267		
1929–30	Detroit	10–9	.526		
1930–31	Detroit	10–9	.526		
1931–32	Detroit	8–8	.500		
1932–33	Detroit	12–5	.706		
1933–34	Detroit	7–8	.467		
1934–35	Detroit	4–10	.286		
1935–36	Detroit	12–5	.706		
1936–37	Detroit	11–5	.688		
1937–38	Detroit	16–4	.800		
1938–39	Detroit	15–5	.750		
1939–40	Detroit	14–9	.609		
1940–41	Detroit	11–10	.524		
1941–42	Detroit	13–8	.619		
1942–43	Detroit	15–5	.750		
1943–44	Detroit	13–7	.650		
1944–45	Detroit	8–12	.400		
1945–46	Detroit	15–8	.652		
1946–47	Detroit	12–13	.480		
1947–48	Detroit	7–15	.318		
1948–49	Detroit	12–10	.545		
Missouri Valley Conference
1949–50	Detroit	20–6	.769	7–5	
1950–51	Detroit	17–14	.548	7–7	
1951–52	Detroit	14–12	.538	4–6	
1952–53	Detroit	12–14	.462	4–6	
1953–54	Detroit	11–17	.393	1–9	
1954–55	Detroit	15–11	.577	2–8	
1955–56	Detroit	13–12	.520	3–9	
1956–57	Detroit	11–15	.423	5–9	
Independent
1957–58	Detroit	13–12	.520		
1958–59	Detroit	11–14	.440		
1959–60	Detroit	20–7	.741		NIT 1st Round
1960–61	Detroit	18–9	.667		NIT 1st Round
1961–62	Detroit	15–12	.556		NCAA 1st Round
1962–63	Detroit	14–12	.538		
1963–64	Detroit	14–11	.560		
1964–65	Detroit	20–8	.714		NIT Quarterfinals
1965–66	Detroit	17–8	.680		
1966–67	Detroit	10–15	.400		
1967–68	Detroit	13–12	.520		
1968–69	Detroit	16–10	.615		
1969–70	Detroit	7–18	.280		
1970–71	Detroit	14–12	.538		
1971–72	Detroit	18–6	.750		
1972–73	Detroit	16–9	.640		
1973–74	Detroit	17–9	.654		
1974–75	Detroit	17–9	.654		
1975–76	Detroit	19–8	.704		
1976–77	Detroit	26–3	.897		NCAA Sweet Sixteen
1977-78	Detroit	25–4	.862		NIT Quarterfinals
1978-79	Detroit	22–6	.786		NCAA 1st Round
1979–80	Detroit	14–13	.519		
Midwestern City Conference
1980–81	Detroit	9–18	.333	1–5	
1981–82	Detroit	10–17	.370	6–6	
1982–83	Detroit	12–17	.414	6–8	
1983–84	Detroit	8–20	.286	4–10	
Midwestern Collegiate Conference
1984–85	Detroit	16–12	.571	8–6	
1985–86	Detroit	14–15	.483	7–5	
1986–87	Detroit	7–21	.250	2–10	
1987–88	Detroit	7–23	.233	2–8	
1988–89	Detroit	7–21	.250	4–8	
1989–90	Detroit	10–18	.357	3–11	
1990–91	Detroit	9–19	.321	2–12	
1991–92	Detroit	12–17	.414	1–9	
1992–93	Detroit	15–12	.556	7–7	
1993–94	Detroit	16–13	.552	5–5	
1994–95	Detroit	13–15	.464	9–5	
1995–96	Detroit	18–11	.621	8–8	
1996–97	Detroit	16–13	.552	11–5	
1997–98	Detroit	25–6	.802	12–2	NCAA 2nd Round
1998–99	Detroit	25–6	.802	12–2	NCAA 2nd Round
1999–2000	Detroit	20–12	.625	8–6	
2000–01	Detroit	25–12	.676	10–4	NIT 4th place
Horizon League
2001–02	Detroit	18–13	.581	11–5	NIT Opening Round
2002–03	Detroit	18–12	.600	9–7	
2003–04	Detroit	19–11	.633	10–6	
2004–05	Detroit	14–16	.467	9–7	
2005–06	Detroit	16–16	.500	8–8	
2006–07	Detroit	11–19	.367	6–10	
2007–08	Detroit	7–23	.233	3–15	
2008–09	Detroit	7–23	.233	2–16	
2009–10	Detroit	20–14	.588	9–9	
2010–11	Detroit	17–16	.515	10–8	
2011–12	Detroit	22–13	.629	11–7	NCAA 1st Round
2012–13	Detroit	20–13	.606	12–4	NIT 1st Round
2013–14	Detroit	13–19	.406	6–10	
2014–15	Detroit	15–18	.455	7–9	
2015–16	Detroit	16–15	.516	9–9	
2016–17	Detroit	8–23	.258	5–12	
2017–18	Detroit	8–24	.250	4–14	
2018–19	Detroit	11–20	.355	8–10	
2019–20	Detroit	8–23	.258	6–12	
2020–21	Detroit	12–10	.545	10–6	
2021–22	Detroit	14–16	.467	10–7	TBC 1st Round
2022–23	Detroit	14–19	.424	9–11	
2023–24	Detroit	1–31	.031	1–19	
2024–25	Detroit	8–24	.250	4–16	
2025–26	Detroit	17–15	.531	12–8	
Totals		1,465–1,286	.533		

== Postseason ==
=== NCAA tournament results ===
The Titans have appeared in six NCAA Tournaments. Their combined record is 3–6.

Year	Seed	Round	Opponent	Result
1962	–	First Round	Western Kentucky	L 81–90
1977	–	First Round; Sweet Sixteen	Middle Tennessee State; Michigan	W 93–76; L 81–86
1979	#7	First Round	#10 Lamar	L 87–95
1998	#10	First Round; Second Round	#7 St. John's #2 Purdue	W 66–64; L 65–80
1999	#12	First Round; Second Round	#5 UCLA #4 Ohio State	W 56–53; L 44–75
2012	#15	First Round	#2 Kansas	L 50–65

=== NIT Results ===
The Titans have appeared in seven National Invitation Tournaments and their combined record is 5–8.

Year	Round	Opponent	Result
1960	First Round	Villanova	L 86–88
1961	First Round	Holy Cross	L 82–86
1965	First Round; Quarterfinals	La Salle; NYU	W 93–86; L 76–87
1978	First Round; Quarterfinals	VCU; North Carolina State	W 94–86; L 77–84
2001	First Round; Second Round; Quarterfinals; Semifinals; 3rd Place Game	Bradley; Connecticut; Dayton; Alabama; Memphis	W 68–49; W 67–61; W 59–42; L 63–74; L 71–86
2002	Opening Round	Dayton	L 69–80
2013	First Round	Arizona State	L 68–83

=== The Basketball Classic results ===
The Titans have appeared in The Basketball Classic one time. Their record is 0–1.

Year	Round	Opponent	Result
2022	First Round	Florida Gulf Coast	L 79–95

== Players ==
=== Retired numbers ===
Detroit Mercy has retired 11 jerseys in program history.

Detroit Mercy Titans retired jerseys
No.	Player	Career	Ref.
0	Antoine Davis	2018–2023	
3	Rashad Phillips	1997–2001	
17	Bob Calihan	1937–1940	
22	Dave DeBusschere	1959–1962	
24	Earl Cureton	1978–1980	
32	Eli Holman	2009–2012	
34	Willie Green	1999–2003	
42	Terry Duerod	1975–1979	
44	Terry Tyler	1974–1978	
45	Spencer Haywood	1968–1969	
50	John Long	1974–1978	

=== Titans in the NBA ===
23 Detroit alumni have gone on to play in the NBA including:

- Paris Bass
- Dennis Boyd
- Earl Cureton
- Dave DeBusschere
- Terry Duerod
- Bill Ebben
- Desmond Ferguson
- Willie Green
- Spencer Haywood
- Jermaine Jackson
- Lee Knorek
- Joe Kopicki
- John Long
- Ray McCallum, Jr.
- Dorie Murrey
- Gino Sovran
- Guy Sparrow
- Art Stolkey
- Norm Swanson
- Terry Tyler
- Owen Wells
- Frank Russell
- Terry Thomas

In the late seventies, Coach Dick Vitale led the Titans to two NCAA tournament appearances before coaching the Detroit Pistons and later embarking on a broadcasting career leading to him being put in the Basketball Hall of Fame.

Alumni who played in the NBA G League are:

- Rashad Phillips
- Marc Mazur
