= University of Detroit Jesuit High School and Academy =

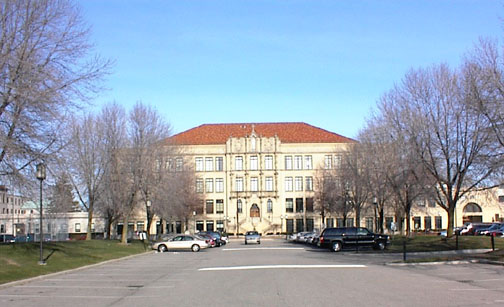

Location
- 8400 South Cambridge Avenue; Detroit, Michigan 48221; United States; 42°25′58″N 83°9′18″W

Information
- Type: Private, catholic, college preparatory
- Motto: Ad Majorem Dei Gloriam ("For the Greater Glory of God")
- Religious affiliation: Roman Catholic
- Patron saints: St. Ignatius Loyola; North American Martyrs
- Established: 1877; 149 years ago
- Status: Open
- President: Daniel J. Dixon, S.J.
- Principal: Malcolm Teasdale, Ed.D.
- Grades: 7–12
- Gender: Boys
- Enrollment: 674 (2025)
- Campus type: Urban
- Colors: Maroon and white
- Slogan: Men for Others
- Athletics conference: Catholic High School League
- Mascot: Cub
- Nickname: Cubs
- Accreditation: AdvancED
- Publication: Inscape (literary magazine)
- Newspaper: Cub News
- Yearbook: Cub Annual
- Tuition: Grades 7–8: $14,000; Grades 9–12: $18,300 (2025-26)
- Website: www.uofdjesuit.org

The University of Detroit Jesuit High School and Academy was founded in 1877, and is one of two Jesuit high schools in the city of Detroit, Michigan, the other being Loyola High School. Located in the Roman Catholic Archdiocese of Detroit, the school is rooted in the Ignatian tradition. It is an all-boys school with an academy for grades seven and eight. The school's mascot is a tiger cub and its teams are dubbed the Cubs. Its colors are maroon and white.

== History ==
In the winter of 1876–77, Thomas O'Neill, Jesuit provincial superior in St. Louis, sent John Baptiste Miege to found the school and serve as its first president. Caspar Henry Borgess, who had come to Detroit from Cincinnati on May 8, 1870, was cofounder of the school.

Originally located at the Trowbridge Mansion on Jefferson Avenue, in 1890 the school moved across the street to Dowling Hall to accommodate a growing student body. In 1923 news began circulating that the school would move to what was then the city's edge. Then in the late 1920s construction of the new building began at 8400 S. Cambridge near Seven Mile Road, under John P. McNichols, president of the University of Detroit. This new building was designed by Malcomson and Higginbotham. Classes at the new campus were scheduled for September 9, 1931, but a polio epidemic kept schools in the Detroit area closed until September 23.

In 1950 U of D Jesuit acquired a new gym. In 1992 under president Malcolm Carron a science center was built, with labs and departmental office space.

In 2001 the school completed its $25 million fund-raising campaign under Timothy Shannon. Funds raised paid for restoration of the original chapel (which had become a library in 1968 after Vatican II) and the addition of several classrooms, an art room, and two new gymnasiums. The faculty endowment, student financial aid, and scholarships also benefited from the campaign.

In 2005, after the closing of several Metro Detroit Catholic schools, University of Detroit Jesuit waived its transfer rules for juniors coming from the closed schools and accepted students with 3.0 or higher grade point averages.

On April 6, 2006, U of D Jesuit began the public phase of a $22 million endowment campaign designed to support tuition assistance, faculty salaries, and other means of strengthening the school's finances.

In 2017 the school proposed to buy a shuttered recreational facility and school that the city had placed up for sale. The president of U of D Jesuit tried to reassure neighbors that some sports facilities would be available to the public in the renovated complex.

== Athletics ==
The Cubs are a member of the Michigan High School Athletic Association (MHSAA) and compete in the Detroit Catholic High School League.

U of D Jesuit fields teams in fifteen sports: football, basketball, baseball, cross country, track and field, wrestling, tennis, golf, hockey, lacrosse, skiing, soccer, swimming, sailing, and bowling.

In its history, U of D Jesuit has won seven state championships:

- The swim and dive team won the MHSAA Division 2 state championship in 2025.
- The track and field team won the MHSAA Division 1 state championship in 2022.
- The basketball team won the MHSAA Class A state championship in 2016.
- The bowling team won the MHSAA Division 1 State championship in 2014.
- The soccer team won the MHSAA Class A state championship in 2001.
- The track team won the MHSAA Class A state championship in 1993.
- The golf team won the MHSAA Open Class state championship in 1927, the school's first state title.

== Extracurricular activities ==
The St. Joseph of Arimathea Club was founded in 2015, placing students as pallbearers for those in need.

== Notable alumni ==
- Connor Barwin: NFL executive and former defensive end
- Ned Blackhawk: historian
- Otis Brawley: Chief Medical and Scientific Officer, American Cancer Society
- Joe Casey: singer
- Michael Cavanagh: Michigan Supreme Court Justice
- Elijah Collins (born 2000): NFL running back
- Guy Consolmagno: Vatican astronomer
- Ian Conyers: Michigan State Senator
- Mark Crilley: Manga creator
- James Curran: dean at the School of Public Health, Emory University
- Rob Edwards (born 1997): NBA player
- Robert J. Elder, Jr. USAF: Command pilot and Air Force Commander
- Keith Ellison: Minnesota Attorney General
- Andy Farkas: NFL running back
- Daniel Fields (born 1991): professional baseball player
- Robert Fisher: bishop for the Archdiocese of Detroit
- David Grewe: Michigan State head baseball coach
- Pat Heenan: NFL cornerback
- Stephen Henderson: journalist, Pulitzer Prize winner
- Tupac Hunter: state senator - Michigan
- Melvin Hollowell: chair of the Michigan Democratic Party
- Bert Johnson: state senator - Michigan
- Gus Johnson: sportscaster
- Lawrence Joseph: poet
- Thomas Kavanagh: Michigan Supreme Court Chief Justice
- Bob King: President, United Auto Workers
- William Kovacic: Former member of the Federal Trade Commission
- Frank Lauterbur: football coach, University of Toledo and University of Iowa
- Elmore Leonard: novelist
- James MacKillop: author
- Bruce Maher: NFL safety
- John McCabe: author
- Greg Russell TV movie critic NBC
- Bill McConico: Judge of the 36th District Court in Michigan
- Jordan Morgan (born 1991): professional basketball player
- Michael Moriarty: actor
- Jamie Morin: Department of Defense official
- Manuel Moroun: transportation magnate
- George D. O'Brien: U.S. Congressman
- Bill O'Brien: NFL player, and coach for Southern Illinois
- James G. O'Hara: congressman from Detroit
- Michael Parks: Pulitzer Prize winner
- L. Brooks Patterson: Oakland County, Michigan executive
- Scott Perry: NBA General Manager
- Jim Pietrzak: NFL offensive lineman
- Geoff Pope: NFL cornerback
- Louis C. Rabaut: U.S. Congressman
- Ron Rice: NFL safety
- Sam Richardson: actor
- Jay Sebring (Thomas Kummer): hair stylist, murdered by Manson Family in 1969
- Richard Tarnas: author
- Mario Trafeli: speed skater
- George Winn: NFL running back
- Cassius Winston (born 1998): basketball player for Hapoel Jerusalem of the Israeli Basketball Premier League; former NBA player for the Washington Wizards, former player for the Michigan State Spartans, 2019 Big Ten Player Conference Men's Basketball Player of the Year
- Tillie Voss: NFL tackle
- Whiterosemoxie: rapper

== See also ==
- List of Jesuit sites
