= Dennis Boyd (basketball) =

American basketball player

Personal information
- Born: May 21, 1954 (age 72) Portsmouth, Virginia, U.S.
- Listed height: 6 ft 1 in (1.85 m)
- Listed weight: 175 lb (79 kg)

Career information
- High school: Theodore Roosevelt (New York City, New York)
- College: Detroit Mercy (1973–1977)
- NBA draft: 1977: 4th round, 72nd overall pick
- Drafted by: New Orleans Jazz
- Playing career: 1978–1979
- Position: Guard
- Number: 11

Career history
- 1978: Detroit Pistons
- Stats at NBA.com
- Stats at Basketball Reference

Dennis Boyd (born May 21, 1954) is an American former professional basketball player.

== Amateur career ==
Out of New York City and public high school Theodore Roosevelt in the Bronx where he averaged 27 ppg as a senior, Boyd signed to play college basketball for the University of Detroit with new Head Coach Dick Vitale beginning with the 1973–74 academic year.

Boyd established himself quickly with a Detroit program that would produce a .722 winning percentage during his time with the Titans (1973–1977). Vitale added future NBA players such as John Long, Terry Tyler and Terry Duerod and built a dominating independent program at the Jesuit university. Boyd played point guard for the team, averaged 10.3 ppg and 7.6 apg as a senior, and was noted for game-winning shots, including wins in his 1967-77 senior season over then #8 Arizona and a historic road win as the #15 Titans defeated #1 and eventual national champions Marquette with Boyd hitting a game-winning jumper with 4 seconds to go to secure the 64–63 win. UD advanced to the 1977 NCAA Division I Basketball Tournament Sweet Sixteen, defeating Middle Tennessee in the first round before losing to Michigan 86–81 to end a stellar season.

== Professional career ==
Boyd was selected by the New Orleans Jazz in the 4th round (72nd pick overall) of the 1977 NBA draft but was cut in the preseason. Vitale took the head coaching position for the Detroit Pistons of the NBA in 1978 and signed Boyd as a free agent for an 8-day stretch in 1978, with Boyd averaging 5.4 ppg in 5 games of NBA action, playing alongside former UD teammates Long and Tyler. He was released by the Pistons on December 28, 1978, bringing his brief professional career to a close.

== Career statistics ==
Legend
GP	Games played	GS	Games started	MPG	Minutes per game
FG%	Field goal percentage	3P%	3-point field goal percentage	FT%	Free throw percentage
RPG	Rebounds per game	APG	Assists per game	SPG	Steals per game
BPG	Blocks per game	PPG	Points per game	**Bold**	Career high

=== NBA ===
==== Regular season ====
Year	Team	GP	MPG	FG%	FT%	RPG	APG	SPG	BPG	PPG
1978–79	Detroit	5	8.0	.250	–	.4	1.4	.0	.0	1.2
