= Mario Trafeli =

Italian-American speed skater (1928–2022)

Mario Trafeli, Jr. (June 6, 1928 – January 21, 2022) was an American speed skater from Detroit, Michigan, United States. He began skating at age 14 and was nationally ranked by 15. By the age of 18 he became the youngest winner of the North American Outdoor Speedskating Championship.

== Biography ==
Raised in Detroit, Trafeli attended University of Detroit Jesuit High School and Academy. He began speedskating at 14 and was nationally ranked within a year of starting on the track. In January 1947, he became the youngest winner of the North American Outdoor Speedskating Championship, winning at the age of 18 a race covering 5 miles (8.0 km) held at Belle Isle Park in Detroit against top American and Canadian competitors. Of the seven events held at the championship, Trafeli won two events (the one-mile and five-mile races) and came in third in three, earning 90 points to win the title ahead of former Olympian Ray Blum, who would have won the title if he had finished in second place (or better) in the final race. Trafeli won the International Race of Champions, a 2-mile (3.2 km) distance race at Madison Square Garden, in both 1952 and 1954. During his career, he set five United States records at various distances and won the Michigan Indoor Short Track Champion on six occasions. While serving as a dentist with the United States Navy Dental Corps with the rank of lieutenant (junior grade) in 1955, Trafeli won the Chicago Silver Skates championship at the two-mile distance.

His accomplishments during his skating career earned him induction into the Michigan Amateur Sports Hall of Fame in 1982, and the National Speedskating Hall of Fame, the National Italian American Sports Hall of Fame (where he was the first speedskater to be inducted) and the Michigan Speedskating Association Hall of Fame, all in 2010.

Trafeli graduated from the University of Detroit Jesuit High School and Academy in 1945. He attended Wayne State University as part of the class of 1951, where he continued skating competitively while playing quarterback for the Wayne State Warriors football team, despite standing 5 feet 7 inches (170 cm) and weighing 155 pounds (70 kg). He served as a dentist in the United States Navy after earning a D.D.S. degree from the University of Detroit Mercy School of Dentistry in 1954.

A resident of Bloomfield Hills, Michigan, Trafeli was married to the former Marjorie Busch, whom he met while in dental school. They have six children. He maintained a dental practice in Bloomfield Hills.

After taking up the sport of tennis at the age of 48, Trafeli earned a spot as the top ranked singles tennis player in the state by the age of 55, a status he maintained for 15 years. At the age of 70 he was ranked first in the Midwestern United States. He won the Southeast Michigan Men's 80 and over doubles championship together with partner Dave Mitchell and has been ranked as half of the top doubles team in the Midwest for those aged 80 and over.

Trafeli died on January 21, 2022, at the age of 93.
