= John Long (basketball player) =

American basketball player (born 1956)

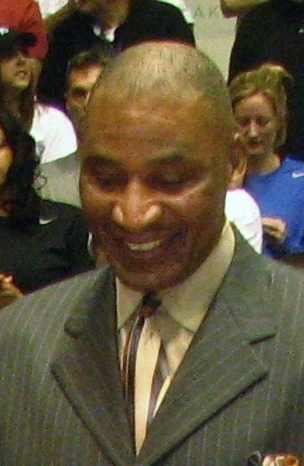
- Long at the dedication of Dick Vitale Court at the University of Detroit Mercy's Calihan Hall in 2011.

Personal information
- Born: August 28, 1956 (age 70) Romulus, Michigan, U.S.
- Listed height: 6 ft 5 in (1.96 m)
- Listed weight: 195 lb (88 kg)

Career information
- High school: Romulus (Romulus, Michigan)
- College: Detroit Mercy (1974–1978)
- NBA draft: 1978: 2nd round, 29th overall pick
- Drafted by: Detroit Pistons
- Playing career: 1978–1997
- Position: Shooting guard / small forward
- Number: 25, 34

Career history
- 1978–1986: Detroit Pistons
- 1986–1989: Indiana Pacers
- 1989: Detroit Pistons
- 1990: Atlanta Hawks
- 1990–1991: Tours Joué Basket
- 1991: Detroit Pistons
- 1994: Sioux Falls Skyforce
- 1996–1997: Toronto Raptors

Career highlights
- NBA champion (1989); No. 50 retired by Detroit Mercy Titans

Career NBA statistics
- Points: 12,131 (13.6 ppg)
- Rebounds: 2,492 (2.8 rpg)
- Steals: 912 (1.0 spg)
- Stats at NBA.com
- Stats at Basketball Reference

John Eddie Long (born August 28, 1956) is an American former professional basketball player.

== Amateur career ==
Long played high school basketball at Romulus High School, and signed to play for Dick Vitale at the University of Detroit. Long established himself quickly with a Detroit program that would produce an unprecedented run during his time with the Titans (1974–1978). Vitale added future NBA players such as Terry Duerod, Terry Tyler and Dennis Boyd and built a dominating independent program at the Jesuit university. Long played shooting guard for the team, averaging 23.3 ppg on a .525 shooting percentage as a senior.

UD advanced to the 1977 NCAA Division I Basketball Tournament in his junior year, defeating Middle Tennessee in the first round before losing to Michigan in the Sweet 16 86–81 to end a stellar season, finishing #12 in the polls.

The team was left out of the NCAA in Longs's senior year, 1977–78, playing in the 1978 NIT, despite a 25–4 record and a #18 ranking. In four seasons at Detroit, Long scored 2,167 points, the first Titan to score more than 2000 points, and was inducted into the Detroit Mercy Titans Hall of Fame in 1993.

== Professional career ==
After starring at the University of Detroit, the shooting guard was selected by the Detroit Pistons in the second round of the 1978 NBA draft. The move was largely influenced by Pistons Head Coach Dick Vitale, who coached Long at UD before going to the Pistons in 1978. He played eight seasons for the Pistons, and averaged a career-high 21.9 points per game in 1981–82. Long was the original backcourt partner to point guard Isiah Thomas before Joe Dumars was drafted. During his time with the Pistons, Long would also play alongside University of Detroit teammates Duerod, Boyd and Tyler. On December 13, 1983, Long scored 41 points, recorded eight assists, and grabbed six rebounds during a 186–184 triple overtime win over the Denver Nuggets.

Long left Detroit to play for the Indiana Pacers in 1986, where he paired with Reggie Miller, and then returned to the Pistons in the 1988–89 Detroit Pistons season, helping the team win the NBA championship. He spent the next season with the Atlanta Hawks and then returned to Detroit in 1990-91, played in France, the Continental Basketball Association, and even played with a touring team for Magic Johnson. Not done, Long signed with the Toronto Raptors in 1996, played with the Raptors for one season, and then retired in 1997 with 12,131 career points. At the time, the 41-year-old Long was the second oldest player in the NBA behind Robert Parish, who was 43.

== Personal life ==
Two of John Long's nephews, Terry Mills and Grant Long, also played in the NBA. The nephews were teammates in Detroit during the 1996–1997 season. All three men played two seasons or more for the Detroit Pistons. Long has worked as a radio analyst for the Pistons.

Long was inducted into the Michigan Sports Hall of Fame in 2016.

== NBA career statistics ==
Legend
GP	Games played	GS	Games started	MPG	Minutes per game
FG%	Field goal percentage	3P%	3-point field goal percentage	FT%	Free throw percentage
RPG	Rebounds per game	APG	Assists per game	SPG	Steals per game
BPG	Blocks per game	PPG	Points per game	**Bold**	Career high
†	Won an NBA championship

=== Regular season ===
Year	Team	GP	GS	MPG	FG%	3P%	FT%	RPG	APG	SPG	BPG	PPG
1978–79	Detroit	**82**	–	30.5	.469	–	.826	3.2	1.5	1.2	0.2	16.1
1979–80	Detroit	69	–	**34.3**	**.505**	.083	.825	**4.9**	**3.0**	**1.9**	**0.4**	19.4
1980–81	Detroit	59	–	29.7	.461	.182	.870	3.3	1.8	1.6	**0.4**	17.7
1981–82	Detroit	69	66	32.0	.492	.133	.865	3.7	2.1	0.9	**0.4**	**21.9**
1982–83	Detroit	70	30	21.2	.451	.286	.760	2.6	1.5	0.6	0.2	10.5
1983–84	Detroit	**82**	**82**	30.7	.472	.200	.884	3.5	2.5	1.1	0.2	16.3
1984–85	Detroit	66	55	27.6	.487	.333	.862	2.9	2.0	1.1	0.2	14.7
1985–86	Detroit	62	30	19.0	.482	.188	.856	1.6	1.3	0.7	0.2	10.0
1986–87	Indiana	80	68	28.3	.419	.284	.890	2.7	3.2	1.2	0.1	15.2
1987–88	Indiana	81	81	25.0	.474	**.442**	.907	2.8	2.1	1.0	0.1	12.8
1988–89†	Indiana	44	1	17.4	.401	.400	.937	1.5	1.5	0.7	0.0	7.3
1988–89†	Detroit	24	0	6.3	.475	–	.846	0.5	0.6	0.0	0.1	2.0
1989–90	Atlanta	48	19	21.5	.453	.345	.836	1.7	1.8	0.9	0.1	8.4
1990–91	Detroit	25	0	10.2	.412	.333	**.960**	1.3	0.7	0.4	0.1	3.8
1996–97	Toronto	32	0	11.6	.393	.353	.893	1.3	0.7	0.3	0.1	4.0
Career		893	432	25.4	.467	.322	.862	2.8	1.9	1.0	0.2	13.6

=== Playoffs ===
Year	Team	GP	GS	MPG	FG%	3P%	FT%	RPG	APG	SPG	BPG	PPG
1984	Detroit	5	–	**29.8**	.364	.000	**1.000**	**2.2**	0.4	1.4	0.0	11.0
1985	Detroit	**9**	**9**	28.3	.457	**.250**	**1.000**	1.9	1.4	**1.6**	**0.2**	**12.4**
1986	Detroit	1	0	13.0	.400	–	**1.000**	1.0	0.0	1.0	0.0	7.0
1987	Indiana	4	4	27.3	.308	.167	.846	1.5	**2.3**	1.5	0.0	11.0
1989†	Detroit	4	0	2.0	**1.000**	–	**1.000**	0.0	0.0	0.0	0.0	1.3
Career		23	13	23.2	.399	.182	.959	1.5	1.0	1.2	0.1	9.7

== See also ==
- List of National Basketball Association career free throw percentage leaders
