= John P. McNichols =

Michigan academic

John P. McNichols, S.J. (February 24, 1875 - April 26, 1932) was an American Jesuit priest who served as the president of University of Detroit from 1921 until his death in 1932.

McNichols organized and oversaw the move of the university from its downtown campus on Jefferson Avenue to its current location at Livernois and Six Mile Road (renamed McNichols Road after his death). McNichols bought the 42 acres that would become the current campus in 1921 for $120,000. He also moved the University of Detroit Jesuit High School from Jefferson Avenue to Seven Mile Road., and founded the Jesuit parish of Gesu just north of the campus in 1922.

== See also ==
- University District, Detroit
