= Terry Duerod =

American basketball player (1956–2020)

Personal information
- Born: July 29, 1956 Royal Oak, Michigan, U.S.
- Died: November 13, 2020 (aged 64) Westland, Michigan, U.S.
- Listed height: 6 ft 2 in (1.88 m)
- Listed weight: 180 lb (82 kg)

Career information
- High school: Highland Park (Highland Park, Michigan)
- College: Detroit Mercy (1975–1979)
- NBA draft: 1979: 3rd round, 48th overall pick
- Drafted by: Detroit Pistons
- Playing career: 1979–1984
- Position: Shooting guard
- Number: 42, 40

Career history
- 1979–1980: Detroit Pistons
- 1980: Dallas Mavericks
- 1980–1982: Boston Celtics
- 1982: Golden State Warriors
- 1982–1983: Detroit Spirits
- 1983–1984: Scavolini Pesaro
- 1986: Ginebra San Miguel

Career highlights
- NBA champion (1981); CBA champion (1983); No. 42 retired by Detroit Mercy Titans
- Stats at NBA.com
- Stats at Basketball Reference

Terry Duerod (July 29, 1956 – November 13, 2020) was an American professional basketball player who played in the National Basketball Association, most notably with the Boston Celtics, where he won a championship in 1981.

== Amateur career ==
A 6'2" guard out of Highland Park Community High School in the Detroit area, Duerod played college basketball under Dick Vitale at the University of Detroit (UD).

Boyd established himself quickly with a Detroit program that would produce an unprecedented run during his time with the Titans (1975–1979). Vitale added future NBA players such as John Long, Terry Tyler and Dennis Boyd and built a dominating independent program at the Jesuit university. Duerod played shooting guard for the team, averaged 23.3 ppg on a .525 shooting percentage as a senior. UD advanced to the 1977 NCAA Division I basketball tournament defeating Middle Tennessee in the first round before losing to Michigan in the Sweet 16 86–81 to end a stellar season, finishing #12 in the polls.

The team was left out of the NCAA in Duerod's junior year, 1977–78, playing in the 1978 NIT, despite a 25–4 record and a #18 ranking, but would return to the 1979 NCAA Division I basketball tournament, with Duerod and future NBA center Earl Cureton leading the Titans. Detroit lost to Lamar 95–87 in the first round. Detroit finished ranked #20 on the season. In four seasons at Detroit, Duerod scored 1,690 points, sixth in school history, and was inducted into the Detroit Mercy Titans Hall of Fame in 1993.

== Professional career ==
When Vitale accepted the coaching job with the NBA's Detroit Pistons in 1979, the Pistons selected Duerod in the third round of the 1979 NBA draft. Duerod averaged 9.3 points per game during his rookie season in the NBA, shooting 47 percent from the field. After the Pistons replaced Vitale with Richie Adubato, however, Duerod was left unprotected in the 1980 NBA expansion draft, in which he was selected by the Dallas Mavericks. During his time with the Pistons, Terry would play alongside University of Detroit teammates Terry Tyler and John Long.

Duerod played only eighteen games for Dallas before being waived. He was then signed by the Boston Celtics, with whom he would become a fan favorite as the team's twelfth man. Celtics fans often chanted "Doooo!" whenever Duerod entered games, and he became a frequent subject of discussion among the Celtics' television and radio announcers. Duerod earned a championship ring when the Celtics won the 1981 NBA Finals over the Houston Rockets. On the Celtics' fans, Duerod said "Best fans in the world. Period. They treat the players great, and support the team no matter what the record is. It was a super experience for me to play in front of them!"

Duerod played part of one more season with the Celtics, then played five games for the Golden State Warriors during the 1982–83 season. In his NBA career, he averaged 6.7 points per game. He was inducted into the University of Detroit Mercy Titans Hall of Fame in 1993.

Duerod won a CBA championship while playing for the Detroit Spirits of the Continental Basketball Association (CBA) during the 1982–83 season.

In 1986, he suited up as an “import” for the popular Ginebra San Miguel team in the Philippine Basketball Association Reinforced Conference, and led the team to the playoffs.

== Later life ==
Duerod served as a Detroit firefighter for 27 years. The majority of his career was spent as an FEO (Fire Engine Operator). Duerod also played on the fire department's basketball team. He retired because of the department's mandatory retirement policy. Duerod died on November 13, 2020, in Westland, Michigan, after suffering from leukemia. He was 64 years old. Former teammate Earl Cureton said, "He did so many things in his life, made so many great transitions. Not just in basketball, but being a husband, being a friend, being a firefighter and everything he did, he excelled at. That is the only way I can sum him up, he was a one-of-a-kind guy." Duerod was survived by his wife Rosemary.

== Career statistics ==
Legend
GP	Games played	GS	Games started	MPG	Minutes per game
FG%	Field goal percentage	3P%	3-point field goal percentage	FT%	Free throw percentage
RPG	Rebounds per game	APG	Assists per game	SPG	Steals per game
BPG	Blocks per game	PPG	Points per game	**Bold**	Career high
†	Won an NBA championship

=== NBA ===
==== Regular season ====
Year	Team	GP	GS	MPG	FG%	3P%	FT%	RPG	APG	SPG	BPG	PPG
1979–80	Detroit	**67**		**19.9**	.472	.283	.682	1.5	**1.7**	.6	**.2**	**9.3**
1980–81	Dallas	18		18.7	.460	.333	.667	**2.2**	**1.7**	**.7**	**.2**	**9.3**
1980–81†	Boston	32	0	3.6	.411	**.600**	**.929**	.2	.2	.2	.0	2.5
1981–82	Boston	21	0	7.0	.442	.000	.333	.7	.6	.1	.0	3.4
1982–83	Golden State	5	0	9.8	**.474**	–	–	.6	1.0	.4	**.2**	3.6
Career		143	0	13.8	.462	.329	.672	1.1	1.2	.4	.0	6.7

==== Playoffs ====
Year	Team	GP	MPG	FG%	3P%	FT%	RPG	APG	SPG	BPG	PPG
1981†	Boston	10	1.2	.400	.000	–	.0	.0	.1	.0	.8
