= Dick Vitale =

American basketball coach and announcer (born 1939)

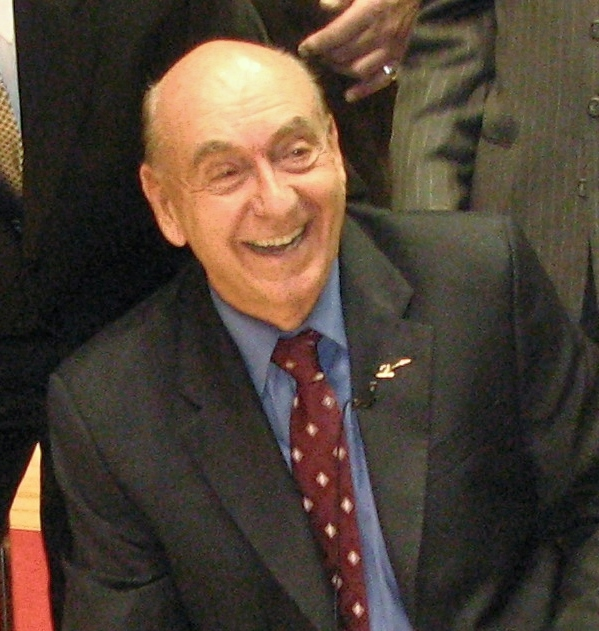
- Vitale in 2011

Personal information
- Born: June 9, 1939 (age 87) Passaic, New Jersey, U.S.

Career information
- High school: East Rutherford (East Rutherford, New Jersey)
- College: Seton Hall
- Coaching career: 1963–1979

Career coaching record
- NCAA: 79–29 (.731)
- NBA: 34–60 (.362)
- Record at Basketball Reference
- Basketball Hall of Fame
- Collegiate Basketball Hall of Fame

Richard John Vitale (/vaɪˈtæl/; born June 9, 1939), also known as "Dickie V", is an American basketball sportscaster and former head basketball coach. He is well known for his tenure since 1979 as a college basketball broadcaster for ESPN. He is known for catchphrases such as "This is awesome, baby!" and "diaper dandy" (outstanding freshman player), as well as his enthusiastic and colorful remarks during games. He has also written fourteen books and appeared in several films.

== Early life and education ==
Vitale was born in Passaic, New Jersey, and grew up in Garfield, New Jersey. He moved to East Paterson (now Elmwood Park) in his freshman year of high school. His father, John, was a piecework clothing press operator and had a second job as a security guard. His mother, Mae, worked in a factory as a seamstress and sewed coats until she suffered a stroke.

Vitale graduated from East Rutherford High School in 1958. He attended Seton Hall University and graduated with a degree in business administration in 1962. He later earned a master's degree in education from William Paterson University, formerly known as Paterson State College.

== Coaching ==
=== High school coaching ===
Vitale took his first job as a coach at an elementary school in Garfield, New Jersey in 1958. Eventually he moved up to the high school level to become head coach at Garfield High School for one season, and then at East Rutherford High School (his alma mater), where he had a record of 131–47 from 1964 to 1971 and led his teams to two New Jersey state championships.

=== College coaching ===
In 1971, Vitale moved to Rutgers University as an assistant coach under head coach Dick Lloyd. After two years, he was then named head coach at the University of Detroit (now Detroit Mercy) on March 31, 1973. He made an immediate impact in Detroit, leading his first Titans team to a 17-9 (.654) record.

After two more successful seasons, Vitale took the 25-4 (.862) 1976-77 Titans to the 32-team NCAA tournament in 1977. The team featured a 21-game Titans winning streak, and the highlight of the season came on February 16, 1977, as #15 Detroit went on the road to then No. 6 and eventual national champion Marquette. Detroit would lose in the second-round of the NCAA tournament to the Michigan Wolverines men's basketball, finishing with a #12 national ranking. Following the season, his fourth as Detroit head coach, Vitale stepped down as coach and was named the university's athletic director.

=== NBA coaching ===
Vitale left the Titans to become head coach of the Detroit Pistons on May 1, 1978, succeeding Bob Kauffman who had served as an interim following the dismissal of Herb Brown 4 1/2 months prior on December 15, 1977. He signed a 3‐year contract with a $100,000 annual salary and a new Cadillac. The Pistons finished with a 30–52 (.366) record in 1978–79. Vitale was hospitalized with stress related stomach issues during his first season on the bench in Detroit as the team struggled. In his second year, on November 8, 1979, Pistons owner Bill Davidson came to Vitale's house and told him that the Pistons were making a coaching change. It was twelve games into the 1979–80 Detroit Pistons season, and with the Pistons off to a 4–8 start, Vitale was fired on November 8, 1979, with assistant coach Richie Adubato promoted to replace him on an interim basis.

A significant reason for Vitale's downfall with the Pistons was the maneuver that brought Bob McAdoo to Detroit. M.L. Carr's decision to sign with Boston as a free agent in 1979 spawned a transaction in which the Pistons, with Vitale in charge of player personnel, entitled to compensation for Carr, demanded McAdoo, whom the Celtics were looking to unload due to injuries. The Pistons sent two 1980 first-round draft picks (in addition to Carr) to the Celtics in exchange for McAdoo in a combination free agent signing/trade. The Pistons would have the worst season in franchise history in 1979–80, and their pick would become the first overall pick in the 1980 draft. Boston then traded the two picks to the Warriors (who selected Joe Barry Carroll with the number 1 pick and Rickey Brown with the number 13 pick) in exchange for Robert Parish and the number 3 pick (Kevin McHale).

== Head coaching record ==
=== College ===
Record table
Season	Team	Overall	Conference	Standing	Postseason
Detroit Titans (NCAA Division I independent) (1973–1977)
1973–74	Detroit	17–9			
1974–75	Detroit	17–9			
1975–76	Detroit	19–8			
1976–77	Detroit	26–3			NCAA Division I Sweet 16
Detroit:		79–29 (.731)			
Total:		79–29 (.731)			

=== NBA ===
Legend
Regular season	G	Games coached	W	Games won	L	Games lost	W–L %	Win–loss %
Playoffs	PG	Playoff games	PW	Playoff wins	PL	Playoff losses	PW–L %	Playoff win–loss %

Team	Year	G	W	L	W–L%	Finish	PG	PW	PL	PW–L%	Result
Detroit	1978–79	82	30	52	.366	4th in Central	—	—	—	—	Missed playoffs
Detroit	1979–80	12	4	8	.333	(fired)	—	—	—	—	—
Career		94	34	60	.362		—	—	—	—	

== Broadcasting ==
Following his departure as coach of the Detroit Pistons, Scotty Connal gave Vitale his first TV opportunity at ESPN cable network. His first reaction to the job of broadcaster was "Absolutely no way. I know nothing about TV. I want to get back to where I belong and my spirit belongs." He was reluctant to accept the position but his wife Lorraine told him to "go on TV and have some fun", so Vitale accepted on a temporary basis until another coaching job became available. He called ESPN's first college basketball game on December 5, 1979, when DePaul defeated Wisconsin 90–77. His first play-by-play partner was Joe Boyle.

Vitale was not a natural at first for broadcasting. He missed his first-ever production meeting when he was walking the streets of Chicago. Also, he would talk while the producers were talking to him through his earpiece, during commercials, and while the play-by-play man was talking. Vitale himself was not sure if broadcasting would fit him. Connal, who had hired him, told him, "You have a quality we can't teach." Vitale did not understand this until many people wanted his autograph at the 1983 Final Four. He credits a lot of his success to working with Jim Simpson at the beginning of his career.

In 1985, after the American Broadcasting Company acquired ESPN, Vitale also began doing broadcasts on the ABC network.

In 1999, Vitale was featured in a series of thirty-second promo shorts for "Hoops Malone". The shorts, which aired in heavy rotation on ESPN, were presented as a sitcom featuring Vitale, George Gervin and others, including a puppet called "O'Hoolix". ESPN promoted "Hoops" with banners and other marketing premiums, with the idea of generating buzz about the show, but no actual episodes were ever produced. Though this led to an offer for Vitale to do an actual sitcom, he turned down the opportunity.

In December 2002, Vitale called a St. Vincent – St. Mary's–Oak Hill Academy prep game, featuring then high school phenom LeBron James. He announced the game with Dan Shulman and NBA great Bill Walton.

By the 2004–05 season, Vitale was doing approximately 40 games a year.

Vitale is signed with ESPN through the 2023–24 college basketball season.

In February 2015, ESPN removed Vitale from covering Duke-UNC basketball. He had covered every Duke-UNC game televised by ESPN since 1979.

Vitale is a voter on the AP Top 25 men's basketball polls, the annual Naismith Award and the John Wooden Award.

Vitale called his first NBA game on television since the 1984 NBA playoffs, along with Dan Shulman, on January 7, 2009, when the Miami Heat played the Denver Nuggets as ESPN swapped its NBA and NCAA crews. During ESPN's first incarnation covering the NBA, he regularly covered games.

In January 2022, Vitale announced that he would take the remainder of the season off to rest his voice before undergoing planned vocal surgery and would not commentate any more college basketball games that season. He returned to broadcasting in November to provide coverage for the 2022 Champions Classic game between Kentucky and Michigan State.

On May 5, 2025, ESPN announced they had signed Vitale to a two-year contract extension through the 2027–28 season.

On March 17, 2026, Vitale called his first NCAA Tournament game, joining TNT Sports broadcasters Brian Anderson and Charles Barkley, for a First Four game in Dayton, Ohio.

=== Broadcasting partners ===
As of 2009, Vitale had called close to a thousand games. Vitale, a color commentator, is primarily paired with play-by-play announcers Mike Patrick, primarily those in the ACC games; and Dan Shulman for Saturday Primetime and other non-ACC games. During the postseason, he appears as an in-studio analyst with host Rece Davis and fellow analysts Jay Bilas, Digger Phelps, Hubert Davis, and Bob Knight. Previously, he has been paired with Keith Jackson, Roger Twibell, and Brent Musburger for ABC as well as Jim Simpson, Tim Brando, Mike Tirico, Dave O'Brien, Sean McDonough and Brad Nessler. He worked in the studio with Bob Ley, John Saunders, Tirico, and Chris Fowler as well as Jim Valvano.

== Awards and honors ==
Basketball

- University of Detroit named their basketball court "Dick Vitale Court" in his honor (2011).

Broadcasting

- 2019 Sports Emmy Award – Lifetime Achievement

ESPY Awards

- 2022 Jimmy V Award

Halls of Fame

- Naismith Memorial Basketball Hall of Fame inductee (class of 2008)
- College Basketball Hall of Fame inductee (class of 2008)
- Little League Museum Hall of Excellence inductee (class of 2012)
- NSMA Hall of Fame (class of 2013)
- New Jersey Hall of Fame inductee (class of 2016)
- Italian American Sports Hall of Fame (class of 2020)

== Appearances in other media ==
=== Video games ===
Dick Vitale lent his name, voice and likeness to the 1994 Sega Genesis college basketball video game Dick Vitale's "Awesome, Baby!" College Hoops, developed and sold by Time Warner Interactive and only released in the United States. Later, Vitale and Brad Nessler provided the commentator voices for EA Sports' NCAA Basketball (formerly NCAA March Madness) video game series until its 2010 discontinuation.

=== Books ===
In 2004, Vitale released a descriptive autobiography co-written with Dick Weiss, entitled Living a Dream. The book has several thoughts and comments on his days with the Pistons and ESPN, and memories of former NC State basketball Coach Jim Valvano.

=== Product endorsements ===
Vitale has appeared in commercials for DiGiorno pizza, Oberto beef jerky, the Airborne Athletics basketball training device Dr. Dish, GEICO and Hooters restaurants. Appearing in early 1990s Taco Bell TV ads promoting the 7-layer burrito, Vitale exclaimed, "It's 'Sevendipity,' baby !!

=== Films and television ===
In 1988, Vitale had a cameo appearance as a baseball color commentator, sharing the crowded broadcast booth with Curt Gowdy, Jim Palmer, Dick Enberg, Mel Allen, Tim McCarver and Joyce Brothers in The Naked Gun: From the Files of Police Squad!. He guest starred on The Cosby Show along with friend Jim Valvano as furniture movers in the eighth-season episode The Getaway. Other film appearances have generally been Vitale playing himself and commentating the fictional games occurring in those films.

==== Film roles ====
- The Naked Gun: From the Files of Police Squad! (1988) – Baseball Announcer #1
- Blue Chips (1994) – Himself
- Jury Duty (1995) – Hal Gibson
- The Sixth Man (1997) – Himself
- He Got Game (1998) – Himself
- Love & Basketball (2000) – Himself
- Complete Guide to Guys (2005) – Himself
- Home of the Giants (2007) – Himself
- Kick Buttowski: Suburban Daredevil (2012) – Viking Mayor

== Personal life ==
Vitale married Lorraine McGrath in 1971. The couple have two daughters, Terri and Sherri, and five grandchildren. He has lived in Lakewood Ranch, Florida, in the greater Tampa Bay area since the 1990s and has become a well-known fan of the Tampa Bay Buccaneers, Lightning, and Rays. He is a Catholic.

In August 2021, Vitale announced that he was undergoing treatment to remove melanoma that had been discovered by doctors. In October of the same year, Vitale also announced that his doctors had diagnosed him with lymphoma which he would seek treatment to combat. In December 2021, he was diagnosed with pre-cancerous dysplasia and ulcerous lesions on his vocal cords, and lost his voice for four months after undergoing surgeries. In August 2022, Vitale announced that his doctors had officially declared him "cancer free". In July 2023, he announced that he had been diagnosed with laryngeal cancer and would undergo six weeks of radiation therapy. In December 2023, Vitale once again announced that he was cancer free and held a clean bill of health. On June 28, 2024, Vitale announced he had been diagnosed with lymph node cancer and would undergo surgery. On December 13, Vitale announced he was again cancer free. On April 13, 2026, Vitale announced that he had been diagnosed with melanoma.

== Publications ==
Vitale has authored fourteen books, including:

- Dickie V's ABCs and 1-2-3s, Ascend Books (October 2010)
- Living a Dream: Reflections on 25 Years Sitting in the Best Seat, Champaign, IL Sports Publishing LLC (January 1, 2003)
- Dick Vitale's Fabulous 50 Players and Moments in College Basketball: From the Best Seat in the House During My 30 Years at ESPN, Ascend Books (October 6, 2008)
- Time Out Baby!, Berkley (December 1, 1992)
- Vitale, Simon and Schuster; 1st Edition (1988)
- Dickie V's Top 40 All-Everything Teams, Masters Press (June 1994)
- Tourney Time: It's Awesome Baby!, Masters Press (December 1993)
- Holding Court: Reflections on the Game I Love, Masters Press (November 1995)
- Campus Chaos: Why the Game I Love Is Breaking My Heart, Sideline Sports Publishing (December 1999)
- Getting a W in the Game of Life: Using My T.E.A.M. Model to Motivate, Elevate, and Be Great (Oct. 2012)
- Dick Vitale's Mount Rushmores of College Basketball; Nico 11 Publishing (2018)
- The Lost Season: A Look at What the Journey to the 2020 National Championship Could Have Been (June 2020)
