= University of Detroit Mercy =

Catholic university in Detroit, Michigan, US

Coordinates: 42°24′51″N 83°08′17″W

- Former names: Detroit College (1877–1911); University of Detroit (1911–1990); Mercy College of Detroit (1941–1990)
- Motto: Ad maiorem Dei gloriam (Latin); Maria, Sedes Sapientiae (Latin)
- Motto in English: For the greater glory of God; Mary, Seat of Wisdom
- Type: Private university
- Established: 1877; 149 years ago
- Religious affiliation: Catholic (Jesuit / Sisters of Mercy)
- Academic affiliations: AJCU, ACCU, NAICU
- Endowment: $128.8 million (2025)
- President: Donald B. Taylor
- Faculty: 212 full-time, 99 professional level
- Students: 5,587 (fall 2024)
- Undergraduates: 3,422 (fall 2024)
- Postgraduates: 2,165 (fall 2024)
- Location: Detroit, Michigan, United States
- Campus: Urban, 91 acres (36.8 ha)
- Colors: Blue, red, white
- Nickname: Titans
- Sporting affiliations: NCAA Division I: Horizon League, NEC, MAC, Central Collegiate Fencing Conference
- Mascot: Tommy Titan
- Website: udmercy.edu

The University of Detroit Mercy is a private Catholic university in Detroit, Michigan, United States. It is sponsored by both the Society of Jesus (Jesuits) and the Sisters of Mercy. The university was founded in 1877 and is the largest Catholic university in Michigan. It has four campuses where it offers more than 100 academic degree programs. In athletics, the university sponsors 17 NCAA Division I sports for men and women. It is a member of the Horizon League.

== History ==
University of Detroit Mercy's origin dates back to 1877 with the founding of Detroit College near downtown Detroit by the Society of Jesus, under the leadership of John Baptist Miège. The college became the University of Detroit in 1911, and in 1927 John P. McNichols, the then-president, established a second campus. In 1941, the Sisters of Mercy opened Mercy College of Detroit.

In 1990, these two institutions consolidated to become University of Detroit Mercy. The school appointed Donald Taylor as its 26th president in July 2022.

== Colleges and campuses ==
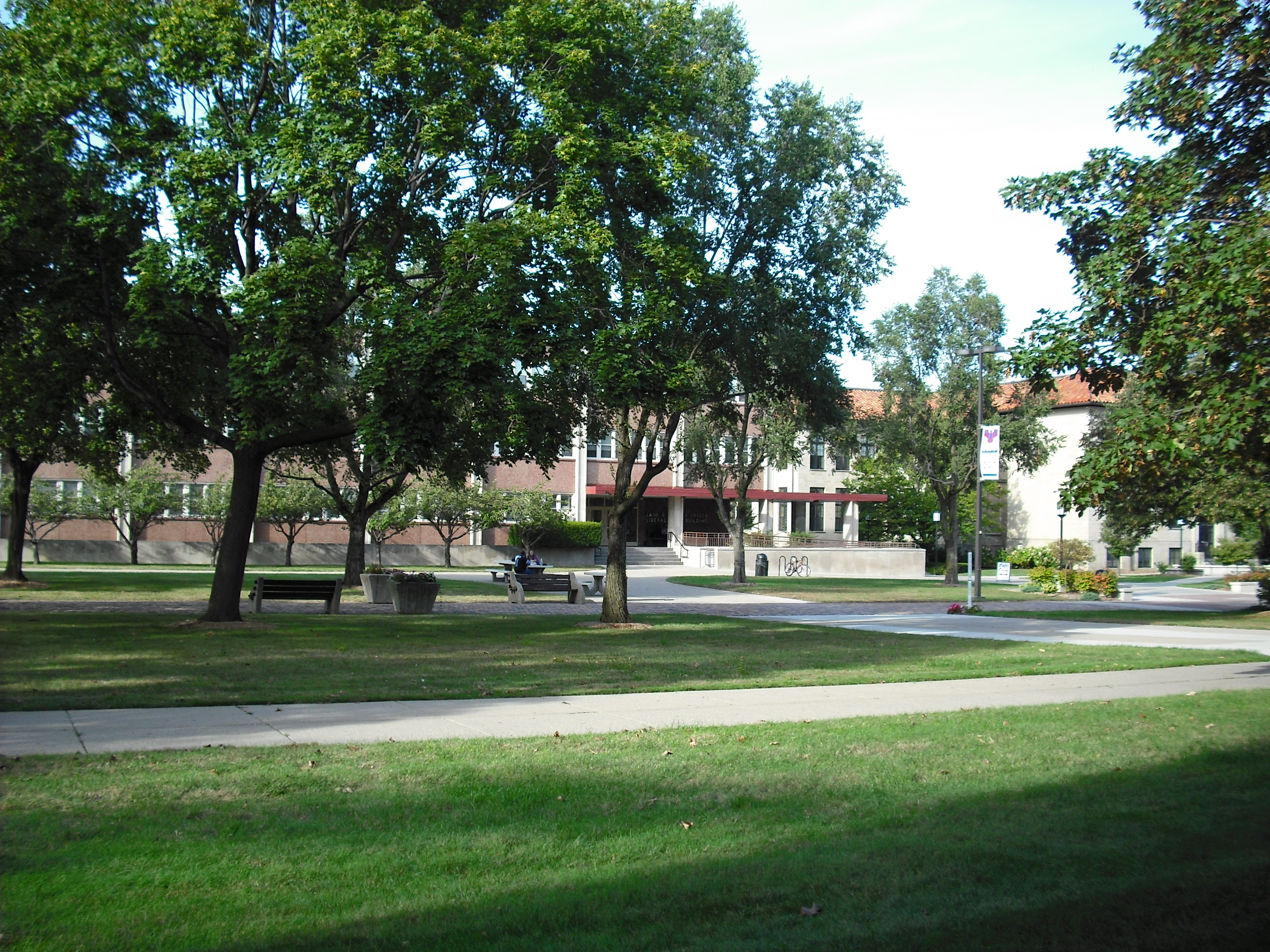
University of Detroit Mercy McNichols Campus

The University of Detroit Mercy comprises eight colleges and schools: School of Architecture and Community Development, College of Business Administration, School of Dentistry, College of Engineering & Science, College of Health Professions, McAuley School of Nursing, School of Law, and the College of Humanities, Arts & Social Sciences.

The university has three campuses in the city of Detroit and one in Novi, Michigan, northwest of Detroit. The main campus is on the southeast corner of McNichols Road and Livernois Avenue, in northwest Detroit (near the University District, Pilgrim Village and Palmer Woods neighborhoods). The majority of the university's undergraduate and graduate programs are offered on this campus, as well as the university's main administration and athletic facilities like Calihan Hall. It is also the location of all six student residence halls. The university's Riverfront Campus in downtown Detroit hosts the School of Law, and its Corktown Campus hosts the School of Dentistry and Dental Clinic.

Aside from Detroit Mercy's own campuses, the university offers undergraduate and graduate programs at Macomb University Center in Clinton Township, Michigan. Detroit Mercy has also partnered with Aquinas College and St. Mary Mercy Hospital in Grand Rapids, Michigan to offer a Nursing prelicensure program.

A former campus at 8200 West Outer Drive in Detroit was home to Mercy College of Detroit from 1941 until consolidation in 1990. As part of University of Detroit Mercy, the Outer Drive Campus hosted Detroit Mercy's Dentistry Clinic starting in 1997. The college agreed to sell the Outer Drive Campus to WCCCD in 2003, and the Detroit Mercy School of Dentistry and Clinic moved to the Corktown Campus in January 2008.

== Academics ==
Detroit Mercy's most popular undergraduate majors, in terms of 2021 graduates were Registered Nursing/Registered Nurse, Biology/Biological Sciences, Business Administration & Management, Architectural and Building Sciences, Dental Hygiene/Hygienist, Mechanical Engineering.

=== Black Abolitionist Archive ===
The Black Abolitionist Archive is a digital collection of over 800 speeches by antebellum African Americans including 14,000 documents, an extensive microfilm library, a clipping file, a library of scholarly books, articles, and dissertations providing a portrait of black involvement in the anti-slavery movement. Dr. James O. Horton of the Smithsonian Institution's Afro-American Communities Project has called it "the most extensive primary source collection on antebellum black activism."

=== Carney Latin American Solidarity Archive ===
The Padre Guadalupe Carney Latin American Solidarity Archive (CLASA) contains a collection of Spanish and English books, human rights reports, independent newspapers and newsletters, and social justice papers representing more than 25 years of work by individuals and organizations working in solidarity to aid the people of Latin America.

=== Center for Social Entrepreneurship ===
The Center for Social Entrepreneurship works to develop the capacity of Detroit enterprises that have a social mission, meaning in addition to regular business goals, they aspire to create social good within their community. The center's main service is the CSE Boost Program, which is an in-person workshop for early-stage social organizations.

=== Dental clinics ===
The School of Dentistry provides several dental and specialty clinics to the community, including a mobile clinic based in a customized RV. Because the clinics are student clinical programs (where student doctors provide treatment under the supervision of licensed faculty dentists), services can be offered at a reduced cost.

=== Institute for North Korean Studies ===
The Institute for North Korean Studies (INKS) is a United States–based non-partisan, non-proprietary research center founded at the College of Business Administration at the University of Detroit Mercy in April 2004. INKS is distinguished as the first research center in the United States or Europe to focus exclusively on North Korea. INKS organizes seminars and publishes research and monographs in collaboration with McFarland and Company, Inc., Publishers. The international and interdisciplinary academic journal of the center is North Korean Review.

=== Law clinics ===
In 1965 University of Detroit's Urban Law Clinic received the ABA Louis M. Brown Award for Legal Access with Meritorious Recognition in 2012 and the ABA Law Student Division's Judy M. Weightman Memorial Public Interest Award in 2006. In 2003 the clinic acquired a 28-foot-long mobile law office, perhaps the first such facility in the country. In 2012 a downtown building was purchased and renovated for the clinic, bringing the clinic closer to the court buildings. At that time the clinic courses served over 1000 clients a year.

Detroit Mercy Law students must take one regular, semester-long "clinic" course that places them in contact with the underrepresented in an area of their choice, with options covering most specializations. The courses provide them with the skills and knowledge requisite for their clinical work, together with guided reflection and individual contact with the professor, including a comprehensive final interview.

The clinic courses offered at Detroit Mercy, all of which fulfill the student requirement, are:

- Immigration Law Clinic: This serves immigrants seeking family sponsorship or Special Immigrant Juvenile Status, or advancing Violence against Women Act Petitions. Students represent clients in U.S. Immigration Court; other court experiences are the U.S. Department of Homeland Security, the Board of Immigration Appeals, and the U.S. Court of Appeals for the Sixth Circuit.
- Veterans Law Clinic: Students argue before the Department of Veterans Affairs for disability benefits for veterans.
- Criminal Trial Clinic: This prepares students for all aspects of defense in misdemeanor cases, including courtroom appearances and plea bargaining.
- Juvenile Appellate Clinic: Students argue cases before a panel of attorneys pre-trial and may be asked to argue the case in the Michigan Court of Appeals. Most cases deal with child protection or delinquency.
- Appellate Advocacy Clinic, State Appellate Defender's Office (SADO): SADO was founded to give "legal representation to indigent criminal defendants in post-conviction matters." Students prepare briefs to be delivered before the Michigan Court of Appeals or the Michigan Supreme Court, and may deliver their brief first in "mock arguments" before a panel of attorneys.
- Intellectual Property Law Clinic: Inventors without the resources to defend themselves before the U.S. Patent and Trademark Office can get help from the law students, supervised by patent attorneys. To be eligible for this clinic students must possess an undergraduate degree in some scientific field. In conjunction with the University of Windsor, the course qualifies students in both U.S. and Canadian patent law, the first certified program in that dual area.

=== Rankings ===
For 2026, U.S. News & World Report ranked Detroit Mercy in a tie for #183 in National Universities, #22 in Best Value Schools, #194-211 in Best Undergraduate Engineering Programs, tied for #214 in Nursing, and tied for #144 in Top Performers on Social Mobility. This is up in each category but one from the school's 2023 rankings when it tied for #202 in National Universities, #40 in Best Value Schools, #196-212 in Best Undergraduate Engineering Programs at schools whose highest degree is a doctorate, tied for #172 in Nursing, tied for #209 in Top Performers on Social Mobility, and as having the #141 law school out of 196 law schools. The 2025 The Wall Street Journal/College Pulse rankings put Detroit Mercy at #43 in the nation and #2 in Michigan. Detroit Mercy also ranked at #35 in social mobility, #44 in best salaries, and #91 in best value. Detroit Mercy was ranked No. 3 in 2026 by SmartAsset on its list of "America's Best Value Small Colleges and Universities".

== Admissions ==
=== Undergraduate ===
Detroit Mercy is considered "selective" by U.S. News & World Report. For the Class of 2025 (enrolling fall 2021), Detroit Mercy received 4,435 applications and accepted 4,135 (93.2%), with 565 enrolling. The middle 50% range of SAT scores for enrolling freshmen was 1063–1250. The middle 50% ACT composite score range was 22–29.

Fall first-time freshman statistics
	2021	2020	2019	2018	2017	2016
Applicants	4435	3985	4358	3760	4301	4542
Admits	4135	3168	3377	3120	2783	3561
Admit rate	93.2	79.5	77.5	83.0	64.7	78.4
Enrolled	565	419	530	583	550	532
Yield rate	13.7	13.2	15.7	18.7	19.8	14.9
ACT composite* (out of 36)	22-29 (12%^{†})	22-27 (20%^{†})	21-28 (24%^{†})	21-27 (30%^{†})	22-27 (41%^{†})	22-27 (92%^{†})
SAT composite* (out of 1600)	1063–1250 (45%^{†})	1060–1245 (74%^{†})	1060–1230 (71%^{†})	1050–1250 (66%^{†})	--	--
* middle 50% range^{†} percentage of first-time freshmen who chose to submit

Undergraduate admissions statistics
- 2021 entering class
- Admit rate: 93.2 (▲ +14.8)
- Yield rate: 13.7 (▼ −1.2)

Test scores middle 50%
- SAT Total: 1063–1250 (among 45% of FTFs)
- ACT Composite: 22–29 (among 12% of FTFs)

=== Graduate ===
For Fall 2022, the University of Detroit Mercy School of Law received 955 applications and accepted 536 (56.13%). Of those accepted, 209 enrolled, a yield rate of 38.99%. The School of Law had a middle-50% LSAT range of 150-157 with an average of 154 and an average GPA of 3.39 for the 2022 first year class.

== Greek life ==
The University of Detroit Mercy has seven fraternities and seven sororities on campus.

== Athletics ==
The University of Detroit Mercy sponsors 17 NCAA Division I-level varsity sports teams. Men's and women's Detroit Mercy Titans teams compete primarily in the Horizon League. Sports include Basketball, Cross Country, Fencing (Central Collegiate Fencing Conference), Golf, Lacrosse (men's: Northeast Conference; women's: Mid-American Conference), Soccer, Softball (women's team only), Track and Field (indoor), and Track and Field (outdoor).

Detroit Mercy's most recent league championship came in 2019, when the women's softball team won the Horizon League Championship. In 2014, both the women's golf team and men's cross country team earned Horizon League titles for the second straight season. The men's lacrosse team won the Metro Atlantic Athletic Conference Championship in 2013.

=== Basketball ===
The men's basketball team has consistently contended for the Horizon League title. Mark Montgomery was hired as the 23rd head coach in men's basketball program history on April 3, 2024. Montgomery joined the Titans after spending 13 years in two stints as an assistant coach under coach Tom Izzo at Michigan State, where he also played. An Inkster, Michigan native, Montgomery was an assistant coach at UDM for the end of the 2020-21 season, in which time the Titans went 11-3 in their last 14 games.

Mike Davis coached the Titans from 2017 to 2024. He led Indiana University to the 2002 NCAA Championship game. He led the Titans to a 1-31 season.

Ray McCallum coached the Detroit Mercy men's basketball team from 2008 to 2016. He led the Titans to the Horizon League Championship and an NCAA tournament appearance during the 2011–12 season. McCallum's predecessor, Perry Watson, led a successful program at Detroit's Southwestern High School before coming to Detroit Mercy after some years as an assistant coach at the University of Michigan and maintained strong recruiting ties within the city's public league. Watson guided Detroit Mercy to 10 winning seasons, three league titles, two NCAA Tournament appearances and an NIT Final Four during his 15 years with Detroit Mercy. The Titans' two NCAA appearances also included victories over St. John's and UCLA. Between 1997–98 and 2000–01, the Titans had four straight 20-victory seasons.

Dick Vitale, ESPN college basketball commentator, was the University of Detroit men's basketball head coach for four seasons (1973–1977) before becoming the school's Athletics Director for 1977–78. In his final year as a college head coach in 1977, Vitale led the Titans to a school record 25 victories and the Round of 16 in the 1977 NCAA tournament before losing to Michigan, 86–81. Vitale ended up with a 78–30 career record as head coach of the Titans. In 1978, Vitale left to coach the Detroit Pistons before beginning his broadcasting career with ESPN in 1979. He was the color commentator for the first college basketball game carried by the new network. As its lead college basketball analyst, he helped make the network an integral part of the game's popularity. An author of six books chronicling his love affair with basketball, Vitale received the Basketball Hall of Fame's Curt Gowdy Media Award in 1998, won the NABC Cliff Wells Appreciation Award in 2000, and was inducted to the College Basketball Hall of Fame in 2008. In 2011, Detroit Mercy named its basketball court at Calihan Hall in his honor.

Highlights from the Detroit Mercy Titans men's and women's basketball teams include appearances in the 2011–12 postseason. The women's basketball team participated in the WNIT Tournament for the first time ever and finished with its first 20-win season (20–14) since 1997, when the team made its only NCAA Tournament appearance. The men's basketball team captured the 2011-12 Horizon League Championship and reached the NCAA Tournament for the sixth time in its history and first since 1999.

Detroit Mercy has been a host institution for several NCAA Tournament men's basketball games. The university hosted the 2008 NCAA Midwest Regional and 2009 NCAA Final Four, played at Ford Field, as well as the 2018 NCAA First and Second Round games, played at Little Caesar's Arena. In 2021, Detroit Mercy and Oakland University teamed up to co-host the 2021 NCAA First and Second Round games. The two schools combined to host the 2024 NCAA Midwest Regional, also at Little Caesars Arena.

All home basketball games feature the Titan Pep Band, Dance Team and Cheerleading Team.

=== Football ===
Detroit Titans football was played from 1896 to 1964. The team staked a claim to college football's national championship with a 9–0 record in 1928. Gus Dorais, coach of the Titans from 1925 to 1942, was inducted in the College Football Hall of Fame in 1954. There is a plaque dedicated to him at the entrance of Calihan Hall. He also coached the NFL's Detroit Lions.

== Notable people ==
University of Detroit Mercy and its predecessor institutions have graduated or employed many notable people.

See the main article for some examples:

== See also ==
- Detroit Collaborative Design Center
- University of Detroit Jesuit High School and Academy
- Detroit Titans track and field
- Detroit Mercy Titans
