= 1984–85 Loyola Ramblers men's basketball team =

American college basketball season

1984–85 Loyola Ramblers men's basketball

MW City Regular season champion MW City tournament champion

NCAA tournament, Sweet Sixteen
- Conference: Midwestern City Conference

Ranking
- Coaches: No. 17
- AP: No. 14
- Record: 27–6 (13–1 MW City)
- Head coach: Gene Sullivan
- Home arena: Alumni Gym

1984–85 Midwestern City Conference men's basketball standings
	Conf.				Overall
Team	W		L	PCT	W		L	PCT
No. 14 Loyola-Chicago†	13	–	1	.929	27	–	6	.818
Butler	9	–	5	.643	19	–	10	.655
Oral Roberts	8	–	6	.571	15	–	15	.500
Detroit	8	–	6	.571	16	–	12	.571
Xavier	7	–	7	.500	16	–	13	.552
Saint Louis	6	–	8	.429	13	–	15	.464
Evansville	4	–	10	.286	13	–	16	.448
Oklahoma City	1	–	13	.071	6	–	20	.231
† 1985 MCC tournament winner

The 1984–85 Loyola Ramblers men's basketball team represented Loyola University Chicago as a member of the Midwestern City Conference during the 1984–85 NCAA Division I men's basketball season. The head coach was Gene Sullivan. The Ramblers won regular season and conference tournament titles, reached the Sweet Sixteen of the NCAA tournament, finished with a record of 27–6 (13–1 MW City), and were ranked No. 14 in the season's final AP poll.

== Roster ==
1984–85 Loyola Ramblers men's basketball team
Players
Coaches

Pos.	#	Name	Height	Weight	Year	Hometown
F	21	Alfredrick Hughes	6 ft 5 in (1.96 m)	210 lb (95 kg)	Sr	Chicago, IL
F	41	Andre Moore	6 ft 9 in (2.06 m)	210 lb (95 kg)	So	Chicago, IL

Head coach

Gene Sullivan

Assistant coach(es)

Legend

- (C) Team captain
- (S) Suspended
- (I) Ineligible
- (W) Walk-on
- Injured
- Current redshirt

Sources: Sports Reference, Loyola yearbook

== Schedule and results ==
Date time, TV	Rank^{#}	Opponent^{#}	Result	Record	Site city, state
Regular season
Nov 23, 1984*		Bradley	W 98–80	1–0	Alumni Gym (5,251); Chicago, Illinois
Nov 28, 1984*		at No. 16 Louisiana State	L 96–102	1–1	LSU Assembly Center (12,985); Baton Rouge, Louisiana
Dec 1, 1984*		Northwestern	W 73–67	2–1	Alumni Gym (4,511); Chicago, Illinois
Dec 4, 1984*		at Marquette	L 67–74	2–2	MECCA Arena (10,108); Milwaukee, Wisconsin
Dec 8, 1984*		at No. 17 Oklahoma	L 82–115	2–3	Lloyd Noble Center (11,200); Norman, Oklahoma
Dec 13, 1984*		Long Island University	W 89–82	3–3	Alumni Gym (3,529); Chicago, Illinois
Dec 15, 1984*		at Bradley	W 59–48	4–3	Carver Arena (7,336); Peoria, Illinois
Dec 18, 1984*		Toledo	W 78–66	5–3	Alumni Gym (3,870); Chicago, Illinois
Dec 22, 1984*		No. 4 Illinois	W 63–62	6–3	Rosemont Horizon (15,882); Rosemont, Illinois
Dec 29, 1984*		at No. 20 Louisville	W 93–81	7–3	Freedom Hall (18,959); Louisville, Kentucky
Jan 2, 1985*		at Dayton	L 70–80	7–4	University of Dayton Arena (9,486); Dayton, Ohio
Jan 5, 1985		at Butler	W 86–74	8–4 (1–0)	Hinkle Fieldhouse (3,863); Indianapolis, Indiana
Jan 7, 1985		at Xavier	L 90–95	8–5 (1–1)	Cincinnati Gardens (4,117); Cincinnati, Ohio
Jan 12, 1985		at Detroit	W 85–79	9–5 (2–1)	Calihan Hall (5,321); Detroit, Michigan
Jan 19, 1985		Evansville	W 94–89	10–5 (3–1)	Alumni Gym (4,461); Chicago, Illinois
Jan 21, 1985		Saint Louis	W 85–73	11–5 (4–1)	Alumni Gym (3,611); Chicago, Illinois
Jan 26, 1985		at Oklahoma City	W 80–65	12–5 (5–1)	Frederickson Fieldhouse (1,155); Oklahoma City, Oklahoma
Jan 28, 1985		at Oral Roberts	W 97–92	13–5 (6–1)	Mabee Center (4,229); Tulsa, Oklahoma
Feb 2, 1985		Butler	W 105–90	14–5 (7–1)	Alumni Gym (4,687); Chicago, Illinois
Feb 4, 1985		Xavier	W 99–89	15–5 (8–1)	Alumni Gym (5,015); Chicago, Illinois
Feb 9, 1985		Detroit	W 127–100	16–5 (9–1)	Alumni Gym (5,124); Chicago, Illinois
Feb 12, 1985*		DePaul	W 78–71	17–5	Rosemont Horizon (13,909); Rosemont, Illinois
Feb 16, 1985		at Evansville	W 89–80	18–5 (10–1)	Roberts Stadium (6,521); Evansville, Indiana
Feb 18, 1985		at Saint Louis	W 52–43	19–5 (11–1)	Kiel Auditorium (4,538); St. Louis, Missouri
Feb 23, 1985*		Oklahoma City	W 99–84	20–5 (12–1)	Alumni Gym (5,259); Chicago, Illinois
Feb 25, 1985	No. 20	Oral Roberts	W 86–77	21–5 (13–1)	Alumni Gym (5,308); Chicago, Illinois
Mar 1, 1985*	No. 20	at New Orleans	W 101–85	22–5	Lakefront Arena (3,386); New Orleans, Louisiana
Midwestern City Tournament
Mar 7, 1985*	(1) No. 16	vs. (8) Oklahoma City; Quarterfinals	W 100–85	23–5	Mabee Center (5,334); Tulsa, Oklahoma
Mar 8, 1985*	(1) No. 16	vs. (5) Xavier; Semifinals	W 65–61	24–5	Mabee Center (5,634); Tulsa, Oklahoma
Mar 9, 1985*	(1) No. 16	at (3) Oral Roberts; Championship Game	W 89–83	25–5	Mabee Center (7,567); Tulsa, Oklahoma
NCAA Tournament
Mar 14, 1985*	(4 E) No. 14	vs. (13 E) Iona; First round	W 59–58	26–5	Hartford Civic Center (14,897); Hartford, Connecticut
Mar 16, 1985*	(4 E) No. 14	vs. (5 E) Southern Methodist; Second Round	W 70–57	27–5	Hartford Civic Center (14,897); Hartford, Connecticut
Mar 21, 1985*	(4 E) No. 14	vs. (1 E) No. 1 Georgetown; East Regional semifinal – Sweet Sixteen	L 53–65	27–6	Providence Civic Center (11,913); Providence, Rhode Island
*Non-conference game. ^{#}Rankings from AP poll. (#) Tournament seedings in parentheses. E=East.

== Awards and honors ==
- Alfredrick Hughes – All-American, Midwestern City Conference Player of the Year (3x), Loyola single-season and career scoring leader, 5th on NCAA career scoring list

== NBA draft ==
Round	Pick	Player	NBA club
1	14	Alfredrick Hughes	San Antonio Spurs
