= Loyola Ramblers men's basketball statistical leaders =

The Loyola Ramblers basketball statistical leaders are individual statistical leaders of the Loyola Ramblers men's basketball program in various categories, including points, rebounds, assists, steals, and blocks. Within those areas, the lists identify single-game, single-season, and career leaders. The Ramblers represent Loyola University Chicago in the NCAA Division I Atlantic 10 Conference.

Loyola began competing in intercollegiate basketball in 1913. However, the school's record book does not generally list records from before the 1950s, as records from before this period are often incomplete and inconsistent. Since scoring was much lower in this era, and teams played much fewer games during a typical season, it is likely that few or no players from this era would appear on these lists anyway.

The NCAA did not officially record assists as a stat until the 1983–84 season, and blocks and steals until the 1985–86 season, but Loyola's record books includes players in these stats before these seasons. These lists are updated through the end of the 2020–21 season.

== Scoring ==
Career
Rk	Player	Points	Seasons
1	Alfredrick Hughes	2,914	1981–82 1982–83 1983–84 1984–85
2	Keith Gailes	2,025	1988–89 1989–90 1990–91
3	David Bailey	1,933	1999–00 2000–01 2001–02 2002–03
4	Blake Schilb	1,879	2003–04 2004–05 2005–06 2006–07
5	Cameron Krutwig	1,833	2017–18 2018–19 2019–20 2020–21
6	Jerry Harkness	1,749	1960–61 1961–62 1962–63
7	Carl Golston	1,625	1982–83 1983–84 1984–85 1985–86
8	Darius Clemons	1,610	1978–79 1979–80 1980–81 1981–82
9	Milton Doyle	1,606	2013–14 2014–15 2015–16 2016–17
10	Tony Parker	1,605	1973–74 1974–75 1975–76 1976–77

Season
Rk	Player	Points	Season
1	Alfredrick Hughes	868	1984–85
2	Alfredrick Hughes	800	1983–84
3	Keith Gailes	762	1989–90
4	Gerald Hayward	756	1987–88
5	Alfredrick Hughes	744	1982–83
6	Andre Battle	669	1984–85
7	Jerry Harkness	662	1962–63
	Bernard Jackson	662	1986–87
9	Keith Gailes	657	1990–91
10	David Bailey	651	2001–02

Single game
Rk	Player	Points	Season	Opponent
1	Alfredrick Hughes	47	1984–85	Detroit
2	Paul Sheedy	46	1958–59	John Carroll
3	Keith Gailes	44	1989–90	Dayton
	Keith Gailes	44	1990–91	Dayton
5	Alfredrick Hughes	43	1984–85	New Orleans
6	Alfredrick Hughes	42	1983–84	DePaul
	David Bailey	42	2001–02	Texas A&M–CC
	J. R. Blount	42	2008–09	Rockhurst
9	Jim Tillman	41	1966–67	Marquette
	Keith Gailes	41	1988–89	Oral Roberts

== Rebounds ==
Career
Rk	Player	Rebounds	Seasons
1	LaRue Martin	1,062	1969–70 1970–71 1971–72
2	Les Hunter	1,017	1961–62 1962–63 1963–64
3	Andy Polka	989	2006–07 2007–08 2008–09 2009–10 2010–11
4	Vic Rouse	982	1961–62 1962–63 1963–64
	Alfredrick Hughes	982	1981–82 1982–83 1983–84 1984–85
6	Wayne Sappleton	977	1978–79 1979–80 1980–81 1981–82
7	Cameron Krutwig	946	2017–18 2018–19 2019–20 2020–21
8	Andre Moore	928	1984–85 1985–86 1986–87
9	Javan Goodman	908	1995–96 1996–97 1997–98 1998–99
10	Clarence Red	888	1958–59 1959–60 1960–61

Season
Rk	Player	Rebounds	Season
1	Les Hunter	427	1963–64
2	Clarence Red	402	1958–59
3	Kenny Miller	395	1987–88
4	LaRue Martin	387	1970–71
5	Wayne Sappleton	376	1981–82
6	Vic Rouse	375	1962–63
7	Wayne Sappleton	374	1980–81
8	Art McZier	360	1957–58
	Andre Moore	360	1986–87
10	LaRue Martin	346	1969–70

Single game
Rk	Player	Rebounds	Season	Opponent
1	LaRue Martin	34	1970–71	Valparaiso
2	Clarence Red	30	1958–59	Denver
	LaRue Martin	30	1971–72	Saint John’s (MN)
4	Wayne Sappleton	26	1980–81	Oral Roberts
5	Larry Knight	25	1977–78	Georgetown
	Wayne Sappleton	25	1980–81	Southern Illinois
	Kenny Miller	25	1987–88	Oral Roberts
8	Larry Knight	23	1977–78	Indiana State
	Kenny Miller	23	1987–88	UIC
10	Antowne Johnson	22	1988–89	Bradley

== Assists ==
Career
Rk	Player	Assists	Seasons
1	Darius Clemons	703	1978–79 1979–80 1980–81 1981–82
2	Carl Golston	649	1982–83 1983–84 1984–85 1985–86
3	David Bailey	580	1999–00 2000–01 2001–02 2002–03
4	Braden Norris	506	2020–21 2021–22 2022–23 2023–24
5	Keith Carter	483	1984–85 1985–86 1986–87 1987–88 1988–89
6	Milton Doyle	459	2013–14 2014–15 2015–16 2016–17
7	Blake Schilb	430	2003–04 2004–05 2005–06 2006–07
8	Chris Wilburn	377	1991–92 1992–93 1993–94 1994–95
9	Cameron Krutwig	373	2017–18 2018–19 2019–20 2020–21
10	Don Sobczak	359	1988–89 1989–90 1990–91 1991–92

Season
Rk	Player	Assists	Season
1	Carl Golston	305	1984–85
2	Darius Clemons	287	1981–82
3	Darius Clemons	218	1980–81
4	Carl Golston	176	1985–86
5	David Bailey	170	2000–01
6	Earl Brown	169	1997–98
7	Carl Golston	168	1983–84
8	Keith Carter	165	1987–88
9	David Bailey	158	2002–03
	Braden Norris	158	2023–24

Single game
Rk	Player	Assists	Season	Opponent
1	Darius Clemons	19	1981–82	Northwestern
2	Darius Clemons	18	1981–82	Oral Roberts
3	Darius Clemons	15	1981–82	Oklahoma City
	Darius Clemons	15	1981–82	Dayton
5	Darius Clemons	14	1981–82	Oral Roberts
	Darius Clemons	14	1981–82	Detroit
	Darius Clemons	14	1981–82	Butler
	Carl Golston	14	1984–85	Dayton
	Carl Golston	14	1984–85	Oral Roberts
	Carl Golston	14	1984–85	Oral Roberts
	Keith Carter	14	1987–88	Dayton
	Keith Carter	14	1987–88	Detroit

== Steals ==
Career
Rk	Player	Steals	Seasons
1	Keir Rogers	227	1987–88 1988–89 1989–90 1991–92
2	Lucas Williamson	191	2017–18 2018–19 2019–20 2020–21 2021–22
3	Earl Brown	184	1996–97 1997–98 1998–99 1999–00
4	David Bailey	172	1999–00 2000–01 2001–02 2002–03
5	Blake Schilb	159	2003–04 2004–05 2005–06 2006–07
6	Milton Doyle	151	2013–14 2014–15 2015–16 2016–17
7	Greg Williams	143	1981–82 1982–83 1983–84 1984–85
	Chris Wilburn	143	1991–92 1992–93 1993–94 1994–95
9	Majak Kou	142	2003–04 2004–05 2005–06 2006–07
10	Alfredrick Hughes	140	1981–82 1982–83 1983–84 1984–85

Season
Rk	Player	Steals	Season
1	Keir Rogers	85	1989–90
2	Vernell Brent	74	1992–93
3	Earl Brown	67	1997–98
4	Keir Rogers	66	1991–92
	Justin Cerasoli	66	2008–09
6	Keir Rogers	62	1988–89
7	Milton Doyle	55	2016–17
8	Hunter Atkins	54	1990–91
	David Bailey	54	2001–02

Single game
Rk	Player	Steals	Season	Opponent
1	Vernell Brent	8	1992–93	La Salle
2	Keir Rogers	7	1989–90	Rider
	Keir Rogers	7	1989–90	Saint Louis
	Hunter Atkins	7	1990–91	Illinois State
	Earl Brown	7	1997–98	Youngstown State

== Blocks ==
Career
Rk	Player	Blocks	Seasons
1	Miles Rubin	237	2023–24 2024–25 2025–26
2	Andre Moore	176	1984–85 1985–86 1986–87
3	Bernie Salthe	152	1990–91 1991–92 1992–93 1993–94 1994–95
4	Cameron Krutwig	115	2017–18 2018–19 2019–20 2020–21
5	Ben Averkamp	100	2009–10 2010–11 2011–12 2012–13
6	Demetrius Williams	93	2002–03 2003–04
	Javan Goodman	93	1995–96 1996–97 1997–98 1998–99
8	Majak Kou	91	2003–04 2004–05 2005–06 2006–07
9	Louis Smith	80	2000–01 2001–02 2002–03 2003–04
10	Milton Doyle	76	2013–14 2014–15 2015–16 2016–17

Season
Rk	Player	Blocks	Season
1	Miles Rubin	85	2024–25
2	Miles Rubin	76	2023–24
	Miles Rubin	76	2025–26
4	Andre Moore	66	1984–85
	Andre Moore	66	1986–87
6	Bernie Salthe	61	1994–95
7	Demetrius Williams	55	2002–03
8	Bernie Salthe	51	1993–94
9	Tyrelle Blair	50	2004–05
10	Ben Averkamp	49	2010–11

Single game
Rk	Player	Blocks	Season	Opponent
1	Bernie Salthe	8	1994–95	Wright State
	Andre Moore	8	1984–85	Toledo
3	Bernie Salthe	7	1993–94	Concordia
	JaJa Richards	7	1996–97	Milwaukee
	Majak Kou	7	2005–06	Fairfield
6	Andre Moore	6	1984–85	Butler
	Andre Moore	6	1986–87	Georgia State
	Andre Moore	6	1986–87	Colorado
	Bernie Salthe	6	1993–94	Bowling Green
	Miles Rubin	6	2023–24	La Salle
