= 1985 Midwestern City Conference men's basketball tournament =

- Classification: Division I
- Season: 1984–85
- Teams: 8
- Site: Mabee Center; Tulsa, Oklahoma
- Champions: Loyola–Chicago (1st title)
- Winning coach: Gene Sullivan (1st title)
- MVP: Alfredrick Hughes (2nd MVP) (Loyola–Chicago)
- Midwestern City Conference men's basketball tournaments

1984–85 Midwestern City Conference men's basketball standings
	Conf.				Overall
Team	W		L	PCT	W		L	PCT
No. 14 Loyola-Chicago†	13	–	1	.929	27	–	6	.818
Butler	9	–	5	.643	19	–	10	.655
Oral Roberts	8	–	6	.571	15	–	15	.500
Detroit	8	–	6	.571	16	–	12	.571
Xavier	7	–	7	.500	16	–	13	.552
Saint Louis	6	–	8	.429	13	–	15	.464
Evansville	4	–	10	.286	13	–	16	.448
Oklahoma City	1	–	13	.071	6	–	20	.231
† 1985 MCC tournament winner

The 1985 Midwestern City Conference men's basketball tournament (now known as the Horizon League men's basketball tournament) was held March 7–9 at Mabee Center in Tulsa, Oklahoma.

Loyola–Chicago defeated Oral Roberts in the championship game, 89–83, to win their first MCC/Horizon League men's basketball tournament.

The Ramblers received an automatic bid to the 1985 NCAA tournament as the #4 seed in the East region, and advanced to the Sweet 16.

== Format ==
All eight conference members participated in the tournament and were seeded based on regular season conference records.

== Bracket ==
Quarterfinals; Friday, March 7
1	16 Loyola–Chicago	100
8	Oklahoma City	85
4	Detroit	69
5	Xavier	77
3	Oral Roberts	56
6	Saint Louis	53
7	Evansville	73
2	Butler	72

Semifinals; Saturday, March 8
1	16 Loyola–Chicago	65
5	Xavier	61
3	Oral Roberts	74
7	Evansville	69

Championship; Sunday, March 9
1	16 Loyola–Chicago	89
3	Oral Roberts	83
