= Ray McCallum Jr. =

American basketball player (born 1991)

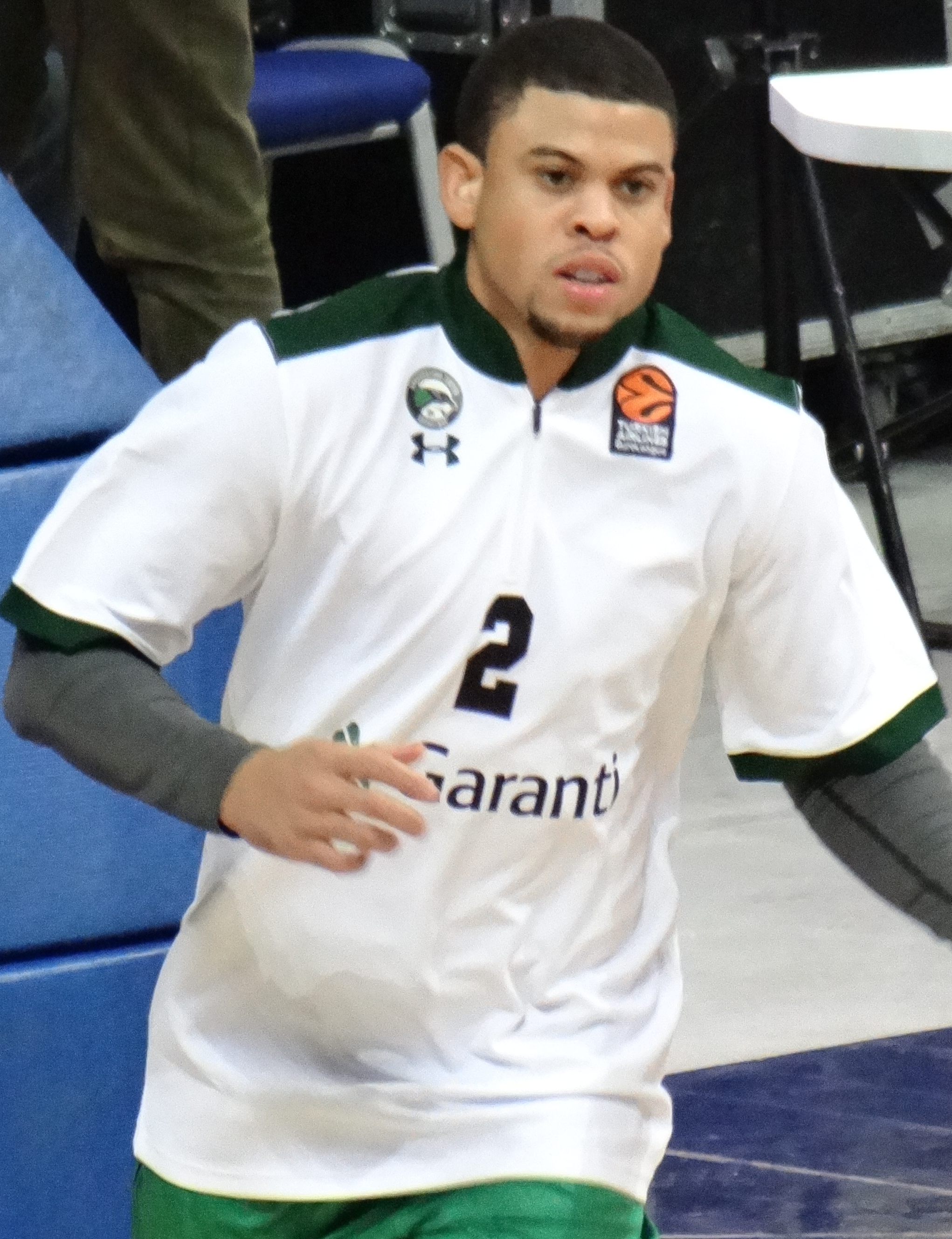
- McCallum Jr. with Darüşşafaka in 2018

No. 5 – TSG GhostHawks
- Position: Point guard
- League: P. League+

Personal information
- Born: June 12, 1991 (age 35) Madison, Wisconsin, U.S.
- Listed height: 6 ft 3 in (1.91 m)
- Listed weight: 190 lb (86 kg)

Career information
- High school: Bloomington North (Bloomington, Indiana); Detroit Country Day (Detroit, Michigan)
- College: Detroit Mercy (2010–2013)
- NBA draft: 2013: 2nd round, 36th overall pick
- Drafted by: Sacramento Kings
- Playing career: 2013–present

Career history
- 2013–2015: Sacramento Kings
- 2013–2014: →Reno Bighorns
- 2015–2016: San Antonio Spurs
- 2015–2016: →Austin Spurs
- 2016: Memphis Grizzlies
- 2016–2017: Grand Rapids Drive
- 2017–2018: Unicaja
- 2018–2019: Darüşşafaka
- 2019: Agua Caliente Clippers
- 2019: Breogán
- 2019–2020: Shanghai Sharks
- 2021: Greensboro Swarm
- 2021: Hapoel Jerusalem
- 2021–2022: Hamburg Towers
- 2022: Fuenlabrada
- 2022: BCM Gravelines-Dunkerque
- 2022–2023: Legia Warsaw
- 2023: Nanterre 92
- 2023: Victoria Libertas Pesaro
- 2023–2024: Karditsa
- 2024–2025: Taipei Taishin Mars
- 2025–2026: Hefei Storm
- 2026–: TSG GhostHawks

Career highlights
- NBA D-League All-Star (2017); Horizon League Player of the Year (2013); 2× First-team All-Horizon League (2012, 2013); Horizon League Newcomer of the Year (2011); McDonald's All-American (2010); Second-team Parade All-American (2010)
- Stats at NBA.com
- Stats at Basketball Reference

Ray Michael McCallum Jr. (born June 12, 1991) is an American professional basketball player for the TSG GhostHawks of the Taiwanese P. League+. He is the son of college basketball coach Ray McCallum. In the 2012–13 NCAA Division I men's basketball season, he was named the Horizon League Player of the Year after leading the Horizon League in scoring at 18.7 points per game and guiding the Detroit Titans to a berth in the 2013 National Invitation Tournament. McCallum also averaged 4.5 assists, 5.1 rebounds and 1.9 steals per game. On June 27, 2013, he was selected in the second round (36th overall) by the Sacramento Kings in the 2013 NBA draft.

== High school career ==
The first two years of McCallum's high school career were spent at Bloomington High School North in Bloomington, Indiana. He then attended Detroit Country Day School in Detroit, Michigan for his final two years. In McCallum's senior season in 2009–10, he led Detroit Country Day to a state championship; in the final against Lansing Sexton, they won 71–47 behind McCallum's 32 points, eight rebounds and seven steals. For the season he averaged 22.5 points, 7.5 rebounds and 5.5 assists per game.

McCallum placed third in voting for the Michigan's Mr. Basketball award, was named to the All-State Dream Teams produced by the Detroit Free Press and The Detroit News, and was a consensus Top 50 player coming out of high school. Parade magazine named him to their All-American team, as did McDonald's. McCallum played in the 2010 McDonald's All-American Game and recorded four points, two rebounds and one steal.

Considered a four-star recruit by ESPN.com, McCallum was listed as the No. 5 point guard and the No. 17 player in the nation in 2010.

== College career ==
McCallum chose to play at the University of Detroit Mercy for his father, Titans head coach Ray McCallum. He was "one of the most highly recruited players in school history" and passed on scholarship offers from schools such as UCLA, Arizona, Oklahoma and Florida.

In 2010–11, he became the first player from the University of Detroit to make an all-Horizon League Team as a freshman, where he earned second team honors. McCallum led his team in scoring (13.5), assists (4.9 apg) and total steals (54). CollegeInsider.com named him to their Freshman All-America squad, and his 157 assists during the regular season was second in the NCAA among freshmen. On February 16, he recorded a near triple-double against Youngstown State with 14 points, 10 rebounds and 8 assists.

McCallum followed up his strong freshman campaign with a strong sophomore year effort. He averaged 15.4 points, 4.5 rebounds, 4.0 assists and 1.6 steals per game en route to first team all-conference honors. Detroit finished with a 22–14 overall record, making it to the first round of the NCAA tournament. McCallum was named a Bob Cousy Award Final 20 honoree.

In 2012–13, his junior year, McCallum became the first player since 2000–01 to be named the preseason Horizon League Player of the Year and to earn that honor during the postseason as well (Detroit's Rashad Phillips had previously been named both). Even though he led the conference in scoring at 18.7 points per game, Detroit finished in second place in the regular season, did not win the conference tournament championship, and were thus relegated to a National Invitation Tournament (NIT) berth. They finished the year with a 20–13 overall record.

== Professional career ==
=== Sacramento Kings (2013–2015) ===
On April 27, 2013, McCallum announced that he was leaving Detroit after his junior season and that he was officially declaring himself eligible for the 2013 NBA draft. He was subsequently selected with the 36th overall pick by the Sacramento Kings. On July 18, 2013, he signed with the Kings after averaging 12.6 points in the 2013 NBA Summer League. On November 21, 2013, he was assigned to the Reno Bighorns of the NBA Development League. He was recalled by the Kings on November 27, reassigned on January 13, and recalled again on January 21. On April 2, 2014, he scored a career-high 27 points in a 107–102 win over the Los Angeles Lakers.

In July 2014, McCallum re-joined the Kings for the 2014 NBA Summer League, going on to earn championship game MVP honors after helping the Kings win the title. On February 27, 2015, he scored a season-high 20 points in a loss to the San Antonio Spurs.

=== San Antonio Spurs (2015–2016) ===
On July 9, 2015, McCallum was traded to the San Antonio Spurs in exchange for a 2016 second-round pick. He made his debut for the Spurs on October 30, recording 2 points and 2 steals in a 102–75 win over the Brooklyn Nets. During the 2015–16 season, he received multiple assignments to the Austin Spurs, San Antonio's D-League affiliate. On February 29, 2016, he was waived by the Spurs.

=== Memphis Grizzlies (2016) ===
On March 12, 2016, McCallum signed a 10-day contract with the Memphis Grizzlies to help the team deal with numerous injuries. Memphis had to use an NBA hardship exemption in order to sign him as he made their roster stand at 17, two over the allowed limited of 15. That night, he made his debut for the Grizzlies in a 95–83 loss to the Atlanta Hawks, recording 13 points, four rebounds, two assists, two steals and one block in 27 minutes off the bench. On March 22, he signed a second 10-day contract with the Grizzlies. On April 1, the Grizzlies decided not to sign him for the remainder of the season.

=== Grand Rapids Drive (2016–2017) ===
On July 26, 2016, McCallum signed with the Detroit Pistons, but was waived on October 24 after appearing in three preseason games. Six days later, he was acquired by the Grand Rapids Drive of the NBA Development League as an affiliate of the Pistons.

On February 3, 2017, McCallum signed a 10-day contract with the Charlotte Hornets. He signed a second 10-day contract on February 13. After the second 10-day contract expired, he returned to Grand Rapids.

=== Unicaja (2017–2018) ===
On August 1, 2017, McCallum signed with the Spanish club Unicaja Málaga for the 2017–18 season. In 67 games played during the 2017–18 season (both in the EuroLeague and all Spanish competitions), McCallum averaged 8.2 points, 2.6 assists and 2.1 rebounds per game.

=== Darüşşafaka (2018–2019) ===
On July 6, 2018, McCallum signed a one-year deal with the Turkish team Darüşşafaka.

=== Agua Caliente Clippers (2019) ===
On February 8, 2019, McCallum signed with the Agua Caliente Clippers of the NBA G League.

=== Breogán (2019) ===
On March 26, 2019, McCallum was introduced by Breogán.

=== Shanghai Sharks (2019–2020) ===
On November 21, 2019, McCallum was reported to have signed with Shanghai Sharks.

=== Greensboro Swarm (2021) ===
For the 2020–21 season, McCallum joined the Greensboro Swarm of the G League.

=== Hapoel Jerusalem (2021) ===
On March 22, 2021, McCallum signed with Hapoel Jerusalem of the Israeli Winner League.

=== Hamburg Towers (2021–2022) ===
On October 25, 2021, McCallum signed with Hamburg Towers of the Basketball Bundesliga. He averaged 5.8 points, 1.8 rebounds, and 1.8 assists per game.

=== Fuenlabrada (2022) ===
On February 6, 2022, McCallum signed with Fuenlabrada of the Spanish Liga ACB.

=== BCM Gravelines (2022) ===
On February 26, 2022, he has signed with BCM Gravelines-Dunkerque of the LNB Pro A.

=== Legia Warszawa (2022–2023) ===
On August 14, 2022, he has signed with Legia Warszawa of the Polish Basketball League.

=== Nanterre 92 (2023) ===
On January 16, 2023, he signed with Nanterre 92 of LNB Pro A.

=== Victoria Libertas Pesaro (2023) ===
On July 9, 2023, he signed with Victoria Libertas Pesaro of the Italian Lega Basket Serie A (LBA). On December 15, his contract was terminated.

=== Karditsa (2023–2024) ===
On December 20, 2023, he moved to Greek club Karditsa for the rest of the season.

=== Taipei Taishin Mars (2024–2025) ===
On November 8, 2024, McCallum signed with the Taipei Taishin Mars of the Taiwan Professional Basketball League (TPBL).

== Career statistics ==
Legend
GP	Games played	GS	Games started	MPG	Minutes per game
FG%	Field-goal percentage	3P%	3-point field-goal percentage	FT%	Free-throw percentage
RPG	Rebounds per game	APG	Assists per game	SPG	Steals per game
BPG	Blocks per game	PPG	Points per game	PIR	Performance index rating
**Bold**	Career high

=== College ===
Year	Team	GP	GS	MPG	FG%	3P%	FT%	RPG	APG	SPG	BPG	PPG
2010–11	Detroit Mercy	33	32	33.3	.440	.313	.691	4.7	**4.9**	1.6	.2	13.5
2011–12	Detroit Mercy	**36**	**36**	33.7	.458	.240	**.766**	4.5	4.0	1.6	.2	15.4
2012–13	Detroit Mercy	33	33	**36.6**	**.491**	**.323**	.717	**5.1**	4.5	**1.9**	**.6**	**18.7**
Career		102	101	34.5	.465	.290	.723	4.8	4.4	1.7	.3	15.9

=== NBA ===
==== Regular season ====
Year	Team	GP	GS	MPG	FG%	3P%	FT%	RPG	APG	SPG	BPG	PPG
2013–14	Sacramento	45	10	19.9	.377	.373	.744	1.8	2.7	.5	.2	6.2
2014–15	Sacramento	**68**	**30**	21.1	**.438**	.306	.679	**2.6**	**2.8**	**.7**	.2	**7.4**
2015–16	San Antonio	31	3	8.3	.403	.313	**.900**	1.0	1.1	.2	.1	2.2
2015–16	Memphis	10	3	**21.9**	.354	**.385**	.600	1.6	2.7	**.7**	**.3**	6.9
Career		154	46	18.2	.408	.335	.711	2.0	2.4	.5	.2	6.0

=== EuroLeague ===
Year	Team	GP	GS	MPG	FG%	3P%	FT%	RPG	APG	SPG	BPG	PPG	PIR
2017–18	Unicaja	30	24	21.5	.422	.286	.627	2.3	2.7	.9	.2	9.2	8.1
Career		30	24	21.5	.422	.286	.627	2.3	2.7	.9	.2	9.2	8.1
