= 1984–85 Oklahoma City Chiefs men's basketball team =

American college basketball season

1984–85 Oklahoma City Chiefs men's basketball
- Conference: Midwestern City Conference
- Record: 6–20 (1–13 MCC)
- Head coach: Abe Lemons (20th season)
- Home arena: Frederickson Fieldhouse

1984–85 Midwestern City Conference men's basketball standings
	Conf.				Overall
Team	W		L	PCT	W		L	PCT
No. 14 Loyola-Chicago†	13	–	1	.929	27	–	6	.818
Butler	9	–	5	.643	19	–	10	.655
Oral Roberts	8	–	6	.571	15	–	15	.500
Detroit	8	–	6	.571	16	–	12	.571
Xavier	7	–	7	.500	16	–	13	.552
Saint Louis	6	–	8	.429	13	–	15	.464
Evansville	4	–	10	.286	13	–	16	.448
Oklahoma City	1	–	13	.071	6	–	20	.231
† 1985 MCC tournament winner

The 1984–85 Oklahoma City Chiefs men's basketball team represented Oklahoma City University in the 1984–85 NCAA Division I men's basketball season as a member of the Midwestern City Conference. They finished the season with a 6–20 overall record, and a 1–13 conference record. They were coached by Abe Lemons in his twentieth season as head coach of the Chiefs. They played their home games at Frederickson Fieldhouse in Oklahoma City, Oklahoma. This was the program's final season in NCAA Division I as OCU moved its athletic programs to the NAIA following the season.

== Schedule ==
Date time, TV	Rank^{#}	Opponent^{#}	Result	Record	Site city, state
Regular season
December 1, 1984*		Southwestern (KS)	W 88–69	1–0	Frederickson Fieldhouse (3,058); Oklahoma City, OK
December 3, 1984*		Texas Wesleyan	W 81–65	2–0	Frederickson Fieldhouse (3,256); Oklahoma City, OK
December 7, 1984*		at Pacific	L 67–80	2–1	Alex G. Spanos Center (3,054); Stockton, CA
December 8, 1984*		at Santa Clara	L 59–74	2–2	Toso Pavilion (2,189); Santa Clara, CA
December 15, 1984*		at TCU	L 60–71	2–3	Daniel–Meyer Coliseum (2,393); Fort Worth, TX
December 21, 1984*		vs. George Mason; UAB Tournament	L 72–79	2–4	Birmingham Coliseum (3,931); Birmingham, AL
December 22, 1984*		vs. Austin Peay; UAB Tournament	W 99–70	3–4	Birmingham Coliseum (4,710); Birmingham, AL
December 29, 1984*		No. 19 Louisiana Tech; All-College Basketball tournament	L 62–90	3–5	The Myriad (9,458); Oklahoma City, OK
December 30, 1984*		Manhattan; All-College Basketball Tournament	W 53–52	4–5	The Myriad (10,287); Oklahoma City, OK
January 2, 1985*		at Texas Wesleyan	W 81–53	5–5	Sid Richardson Center (100); Fort Worth, TX
January 5, 1985		Evansville	L 63–65	5–6 (0–1)	Frederickson Fieldhouse (4,200); Oklahoma City, OK
January 7, 1985		Saint Louis	L 60–73	5–7 (0–2)	Frederickson Fieldhouse (2,612); Oklahoma City, OK
January 12, 1985		at Oral Roberts	L 62–66	5–8 (0–3)	Mabee Center (5,760); Tulsa, OK
January 17, 1985*		Wayland Baptist	L 56–67	5–9	Frederickson Fieldhouse (2,670); Oklahoma City, OK
January 19, 1985		at Butler	L 49–65	5–10 (0–4)	Hinkle Fieldhouse (4,000); Indianapolis, IN
January 21, 1985		at Xavier	L 65–72	5–11 (0–5)	Cincinnati Gardens (6,300); Cincinnati, OH
January 26, 1985		Loyola–Chicago	L 65–80	5–12 (0–6)	Frederickson Fieldhouse (1,155); Oklahoma City, OK
January 28, 1985		Detroit	L 74–77	5–13 (0–7)	Frederickson Fieldhouse (4,555); Oklahoma City, OK
February 2, 1985		at Evansville	W 61–59	6–13 (1–7)	Roberts Municipal Stadium (6,423); Evansville, IN
February 2, 1985		Saint Louis	L 51–80	6–14 (1–8)	Kiel Auditorium (1,782); St. Louis, MO
February 11, 1985		Oral Roberts	L 61–81	6–15 (1–9)	Frederickson Fieldhouse (2,105); Oklahoma City, OK
February 16, 1985		Butler	L 62–72	6–16 (1–10)	Frederickson Fieldhouse (3,257); Oklahoma City, OK
February 18, 1985		Xavier	L 62–73	6–17 (1–11)	Frederickson Fieldhouse (1,785); Oklahoma City, OK
February 23, 1985		at Loyola–Chicago	L 84–99	6–18 (1–12)	Alumni Gym (5,259); Chicago, IL
February 25, 1985		at Detroit	L 65–82	6–19 (1–13)	Calihan Hall (2,031); Detroit, MI
Midwestern City Conference tournament
March 7, 1985	(8)	vs. (1) No. 16 Loyola–Chicago; Quarterfinal	L 85–100	6–20	Mabee Center (4,200); Tulsa, OK
*Non-conference game. ^{#}Rankings from AP Poll. (#) Tournament seedings in parentheses. All times are in Central Time.
