= Rubin Jackson =

American basketball player

Personal information
- Listed height: 6 ft 4 in (1.93 m)
- Listed weight: 208 lb (94 kg)

Career information
- High school: Melrose (Memphis, Tennessee)
- College: Rogers State (1978–1979); Oklahoma City (1979–1982)
- NBA draft: 1982: 5th round, 99th overall pick
- Drafted by: Chicago Bulls
- Position: Shooting guard

Career highlights
- MCC co-Player of the Year (1981); 3× First-team All-MCC (1980–1982)
- Stats at Basketball Reference

Rubin Jackson is an American former basketball player, best known for his college career at Oklahoma City University, where in the 1980–81 NCAA Division I men's basketball season he was named the Midwestern City Conference (now the Horizon League) Co-Player of the Year.

Jackson, a 6'4" shooting guard from Melrose High School in Memphis, Tennessee, played collegiately at Claremore Junior College (now Rogers State University) and at Oklahoma City when the school was a member of the NCAA Division I. Along with Evansville's Brad Leaf, Jackson was the first three-time All-Conference pick in conference history (1980, 1981 and 1982).

His best year was his junior year of 1980–81, when Jackson averaged 24.8 points per game (ranking him sixth in the country in scoring). Jackson teamed with future NBA player Carl Henry to lead the Chiefs to a Midwestern City Conference tournament title. At the close of the season, Jackson was named the conference co-Player of the Year with Loyola's Darius Clemons.

After his college career, Jackson was drafted by the Chicago Bulls in the 1982 NBA draft (fifth round, 99th pick overall). However, Jackson injured his ankle prior to the start of training camp and did not make the team.

In 2024, Melrose High retired Jackson's jersey. Jackson led Melrose to a 38–1 record and a state title in the 1977–78 season.
