= 1984–85 Lamar Cardinals men's basketball team =

American college basketball season

1984–85 Lamar Cardinals men's basketball

1985 National Invitation Tournament, Second round
- Conference: Southland Conference
- Record: 20–12 (8–4 Southland)
- Head coach: Pat Foster (5th season)
- Home arena: Montagne Center (Capacity: 8,000)

1984–85 Southland Conference men's basketball standings
	Conf.				Overall
Team	W		L	PCT	W		L	PCT
No. 8 Louisiana Tech †	11	–	1	.917	29	–	3	.906
McNeese State	9	–	3	.750	18	–	10	.643
Lamar	8	–	4	.667	20	–	12	.625
Arkansas State	6	–	6	.500	14	–	14	.500
Northeast Louisiana	4	–	8	.333	17	–	12	.586
Texas-Arlington	3	–	9	.250	12	–	16	.429
North Texas	1	–	11	.083	5	–	23	.179
† 1985 Southland tournament winner Rankings from AP poll

The 1984–85 Lamar Cardinals basketball team represented Lamar University during the 1984–85 NCAA Division I men's basketball season. The Cardinals were led by fifth-year head coach Pat Foster and played their home games at the Montagne Center in Beaumont, Texas as members of the Southland Conference. They fell to the Louisiana Tech in the 1985 SLC tournament. They received an invitation to the 1985 National Invitation Tournament where they defeated Houston in the first round and lost to Chattanooga by one point in overtime in the second round. Lamar finished the season with a record of 20–12 (8–4 Southland).

The Montagne Center, Lamar's current home venue, opened in 1984. It had an original capacity of 8,000 which was expanded to current capacity of 10,080 after the 1984–85 season. Three home games had attendance over the nominal capacity during the 1984–85 season. Attendance at two more games was within 500 of 8,000 nominal capacity.

Lamar's Tom Sewell was a first round NBA pick and the twenty–second overall pick. Jerry Everett was the ninth pick in the third round of the NBA draft, and was the fifty–ninth overall pick. James Gulley was not drafted by an NBA team at the end of his college career, but played professionally in Israel.

== Roster ==
1984–85 Lamar Cardinals men's basketball team
Players
Coaches

Pos.	#	Name	Height	Weight	Year	Hometown
G		Tom Sewell	6 ft 5 in (1.96 m)	—	Sr	Pensacola, FL
G		Jerry Everett	6 ft 5 in (1.96 m)	185 lb (84 kg)	Sr
F		James Gulley	6 ft 8 in (2.03 m)	—	Fr	Newton, Texas
F		Anthony Todd	6 ft 9 in (2.06 m)	—	So
G		Puntus Wilson	6 ft 3 in (1.91 m)	—	Sr
G		Karl McCauley	6 ft 4 in (1.93 m)	—	So
G		James Nance	6 ft 2 in (1.88 m)	—	So
F		Greg Anderson	6 ft 11 in (2.11 m)	—	Jr
F		Wayne McKinney	6 ft 5 in (1.96 m)	—	Jr
G		Tony Kellybrew	6 ft 1 in (1.85 m)	—	Sr
F		Jules Wells	6 ft 6 in (1.98 m)	—	Fr

Head coach

- Pat Foster (Arkansas)

Assistant coach(es)

Legend

- (C) Team captain
- (S) Suspended
- (I) Ineligible
- (W) Walk-on
- Injured
- Current redshirt

Roster
Last update: January 19, 2024

== Schedule and results ==
Date time, TV	Rank^{#}	Opponent^{#}	Result	Record	Site (attendance) city, state
Non-conference regular season
Nov 24, 1984*		Wichita State	L 65–70	0–1	Montagne Center (7,725); Beaumont, Texas
Nov 28, 1983*		at Southwest Texas State	W 85–75	1–1	Strahan Coliseum (3,106); San Marcos, Texas
Dec 1, 1984*		at Southwestern Louisiana	L 53–57	1–2	Cajundome (8,619); Lafayette, Louisiana
Dec 3, 1984*		Southwest Texas State	W 83–51	2–2	Montagne Center (4,951); Beaumont, Texas
Dec 7, 1984*		vs. Bowling Green; Carrier Classic	W 91–74	3–2	Carrier Dome (20,544); Syracuse, New York
Dec 8, 1984*		at Syracuse; Carrier Classic	L 58–68	3–3	Carrier Dome (20,214); Syracuse, New York
Dec 15, 1984*		at UTEP	L 62–69	3–4	Don Haskins Center (10,822); El Paso, Texas
Dec 21, 1984*		at Rice; Holiday Tournament	L 55–62	3–5	Tudor Fieldhouse (1,261); Houston, Texas
Dec 22, 1984*		Weber State	W 56–51	4–5	Montagne Center (4,380); Beaumont, Texas
Dec 31, 1984*		at No. 11 Washington	L 59–64	4–6	Hec Edmundson Pavilion (3,254); Seattle, Washington
Jan 9, 1985*		at Marshall	W 75–67	5–6	Cam Henderson Center (7,791); Huntington, West Virginia
Jan 12, 1985*		Pan American	W 73–66	6–6	Montagne Center (4,973); Beaumont, Texas
Jan 14, 1985*		Southwestern Louisiana	W 77–64	7–6	Montagne Center (6,198); Beaumont, Texas
Southland regular season
Jan 17, 1985		McNeese State	L 73–84	7–7 (0–1)	Montagne Center (7,672); Beaumont, Texas
Jan 19, 1985		at North Texas	W 79–64	8–7 (1–1)	The Super Pit (1,800); Denton, Texas
Jan 24, 1985		at Texas–Arlington	W 89–63	9–7 (2–1)	Texas Hall (1,025); Arlington, Texas
Jan 26, 1985		No. 12 Louisiana Tech	W 72–64	10–7 (3–1)	Montagne Center (8,317); Beaumont, Texas
Jan 31, 1985		Northeast Louisiana	W 84–70	11–7 (4–1)	Montagne Center (6,085); Beaumont, Texas
Feb 2, 1985		at Arkansas State	L 67–69	11–8 (4–2)	Indian Field House (4,260); Jonesboro, Arkansas
Feb 4, 1985*		Texas–San Antonio; Non–conference	W 80–70	12–8	Montagne Center (6,295); Beaumont, Texas
Feb 14, 1985		North Texas	W 86–60	13–8 (5–2)	Montagne Center (5,892); Beaumont, Texas
Feb 16, 1985		UT Arlington	W 90–52	14–8 (6–2)	Montagne Center (5,892); Beaumont, Texas
Feb 19, 1985		at McNeese	L 68–72 ^{OT}	14–9 (6–3)	Lake Charles Civic Center (4,575); Lake Charles, Louisiana
Feb 21, 1985		at No. 10 Louisiana Tech	L 65–73	14–10 (6–4)	Thomas Assembly Center (7,215); Ruston, Louisiana
Feb 23, 1985		at Northeast Louisiana	W 81–69	15–10 (7–4)	Fant–Ewing Coliseum (1,927); Monroe, Louisiana
Feb 28, 1985		Arkansas State	W 77–68	16–10 (8–4)	Montagne Center (5,956); Beaumont, Texas
Mar 2, 1985*		at Pan American; Non–conference	W 75–69	17–10	Pan Am Fieldhouse (2,465); Edinburg, Texas
Southland tournament
Mar 5, 1985	(3)	vs. (6) UT Arlington; Quarterfinals	W 98–70	18–10	Thomas Assembly Center (3,580); Ruston, Louisiana
Mar 6, 1985	(3)	vs. (2) McNeese State; Semifinal game	W 95–88 ^{OT}	19–10	Thomas Assembly Center (6,155); Ruston, LA
Mar 7, 1985	(3)	at (1) No. 8 Louisiana Tech; Championship game	L 69–70 ^{OT}	19–11	Thomas Assembly Center (6,620); Ruston, LA
National Invitation Tournament
Mar 15, 1985*		Houston; First round	W 78–71	20–11	Montagne Center (8,610); Beaumont, Texas
Mar 20, 1985*		Chattanooga; Second round	L 84–85 ^{OT}	20–12	Montagne Center (8,245); Beaumont, Texas
*Non-conference game. ^{#}Rankings from AP Poll. (#) Tournament seedings in parentheses. All times are in Central Time.
