= Darius Clemons =

American basketball player

Personal information
- Listed height: 6 ft 3 in (1.91 m)
- Listed weight: 210 lb (95 kg)

Career information
- High school: Wendell Phillips (Chicago, Illinois)
- College: Loyola Chicago (1978–1982)
- NBA draft: 1982: 4th round, 71st overall pick
- Drafted by: San Diego Clippers
- Playing career: 1982–1983
- Position: Point guard

Career history
- 1982–1983: Reno Bighorns

Career highlights
- MCC Co-Player of the Year (1981); First team All-MCC (1981); Second-team Parade All-American (1978)
- Stats at Basketball Reference

Darius Clemons is a retired American basketball player. He is known for his standout college career at Loyola University in Chicago, where he was named Midwestern City Conference Player of the Year in 1981. He remains the school's all-time leader in assists.

Clemons, a 6'3" point guard from Wendell Phillips High School in Chicago, won an Illinois state title in 1975 and was named a Parade Magazine All-American as senior in 1978. He chose Loyola over higher-profile programs in part due to the promise of immediate playing time.

Clemons was a four-year starter for the Ramblers. He broke out as a sophomore in 1979–80, averaging 15.6 points per game. He followed that with a better junior campaign, as he averaged 21.9 points and 7.8 assists per game and was named Midwestern City Conference co-Player of the Year with Oklahoma City's Rubin Jackson. The following season, Clemons' scoring dropped to 12.9 points per game as freshman Alfredrick Hughes became the primary perimeter scoring option and center Wayne Sappleton emerged as a scorer. Clemons did see an uptick in his passing numbers as he averaged 9.9 assists per game.

At the close of his college career, Clemons had scored 1,610 points and dished out 703 assists – still a school record. In his peak season of 1980–81, Clemons became the first player in Midwestern City Conference (now the Horizon League) history to lead the conference in scoring, assists and steals. He was the only player to achieve this until Norris Cole did it in the 2010–11 season.

Clemons was drafted in the fourth round of the 1982 NBA draft by the San Diego Clippers, but never played in the National Basketball Association. He played 5 games for the Reno Bighorns of the Continental Basketball Association in 1982–83, averaging 2 points and 1 assist per game before being released. He then left basketball and returned to Chicago.
