= 1985 Southland Conference men's basketball tournament =

- Classification: Division I
- Season: 1984–85
- Teams: 7
- First round site: Campus Sites; Campus Arenas
- Finals site: Thomas Assembly Center; Ruston, Louisiana
- Champions: Louisiana Tech (2nd title)
- Winning coach: Andy Russo (2nd title)
- MVP: Jerry Everett (Lamar)

1984–85 Southland Conference men's basketball standings
	Conf.				Overall
Team	W		L	PCT	W		L	PCT
No. 8 Louisiana Tech †	11	–	1	.917	29	–	3	.906
McNeese State	9	–	3	.750	18	–	10	.643
Lamar	8	–	4	.667	20	–	12	.625
Arkansas State	6	–	6	.500	14	–	14	.500
Northeast Louisiana	4	–	8	.333	17	–	12	.586
Texas-Arlington	3	–	9	.250	12	–	16	.429
North Texas	1	–	11	.083	5	–	23	.179
† 1985 Southland tournament winner Rankings from AP poll

The 1985 Southland Conference men's basketball tournament was held March 5–7, 1985 with quarterfinal matchups being held at the home arena of the higher seed and the semifinals and championship game played at Thomas Assembly Center in Ruston, Louisiana.

Louisiana Tech defeated Lamar in the championship game, 70–69, to win their second straight Southland men's basketball tournament.

The Bulldogs received a bid to the 1985 NCAA Tournament as No. 5 seed in the Midwest region and advanced to the Sweet Sixteen before losing to No. 4 Oklahoma. They were the only Southland member invited to the NCAA tournament. Conference tournament runner–up Lamar received an invitation to the 1985 NIT Tournament.

== Format ==
All seven of the conference's members participated in the tournament field. They were seeded based on regular season conference records, with the top seed earning a bye into the semifinal round. The other six teams began play in the quarterfinal round.

First round games were played at the home court of the higher-seeded team. All remaining games were played at the Thomas Assembly Center in Ruston, Louisiana.

== Bracket ==
Quarterfinals; Tuesday, March 5
4	Arkansas State	62
5	NE Louisiana	70
3	Lamar	98
6	Texas-Arlington	70
2	McNeese State	89
7	North Texas State	78

Semifinals; Wednesday, March 6
1	Louisiana Tech	72
5	NE Louisiana	70
3	Lamar	95
2	McNeese State	88

Championship; Thursday, March 7
1	Louisiana Tech	70
3	Lamar	69
