= Antoine Davis =

American basketball player (born 1998)

Free agent
- Position: Point guard / shooting guard

Personal information
- Born: October 3, 1998 (age 28) Bloomington, Indiana, U.S.
- Listed height: 6 ft 1 in (1.85 m)
- Listed weight: 165 lb (75 kg)

Career information
- High school: Houston Homeschool Athletics (Houston, Texas)
- College: Detroit Mercy (2018–2023)
- NBA draft: 2023: undrafted
- Playing career: 2023–present

Career history
- 2023–2024: Rip City Remix
- 2024–2026: Stockton Kings

Career highlights
- Third-team All-American – USBWA (2023); NCAA scoring champion (2023); 2× Horizon League Player of the Year (2022, 2023); 5× First-team All-Horizon League (2019–2023); Horizon League Freshman of the Year (2019); No. 0 retired by Detroit Mercy Titans
- Stats at NBA.com
- Stats at Basketball Reference

Antoine Davis (born October 3, 1998) is an American professional basketball player who last played for the Stockton Kings of the NBA G League. He played college basketball for the Detroit Mercy Titans. He was twice named the Horizon League Player of the Year, a five-time All-Horizon League First Team selection, and finished his career as NCAA Division I's second all-time leading scorer with 3,664 points and all-time three-point shot maker.

== Early life ==
Davis was born in Bloomington, Indiana, where his father, Mike Davis, was a member of the Indiana Hoosiers basketball coaching staff under Bob Knight. He started training for basketball at age 12 and worked with well-known coach John Lucas II in Houston, Texas. In part to continue his partnership with Lucas, he was homeschooled from seventh grade through high school and played basketball for Houston Homeschool Athletics (aka HHA Mavericks, fka SATCH Mavericks), a private homeschool support organization based in Houston. Davis played for Houston Hoops on the Amateur Athletic Union (AAU) circuit and averaged 23 points per game as a senior for HHA. A consensus three-star recruit, he was considered undersized, at 6 feet 1 inch (1.85 m) and 150 pounds (68 kg), and did not receive offers from any major NCAA Division I programs. After originally signing with Houston, Davis walked on to Detroit Mercy, where his father had been appointed head coach.

== College career ==
Davis scored 32 points in his debut for Detroit Mercy against Western Michigan. He had 42 points against Loyola (MD) several weeks later, setting a Detroit freshman record. Davis scored 48 points in a win over Wright State, hitting 10-of-15 three-pointers. In the season finale, Davis scored 30 points versus Northern Kentucky, and the Titans finished 11–20. Davis finished the season with 132 three-pointers, surpassing the NCAA freshman record of 122 set by Stephen Curry. He became the first freshman to be named to the First Team All-Horizon League team since Gordon Hayward. Davis had 23 games in which he scored 20 or more points, and his 784 points was one behind Rashad Phillips' single-season school record 785 points in the 2000–01 season. Davis was the third-leading scorer in NCAA Division I with 26.1 points per game, to go with 3.1 rebounds and 3.6 assists per game.

On February 29, 2020, Davis scored a season-high 43 points including two clinching free throws with 5.3 seconds remaining in a 90–88 victory over IUPUI. Davis was named to the First Team All-Horizon League at the conclusion of the regular season. He led the league in scoring with 24.3 points per game while also averaged 4.5 assists per game.

Davis passed the 2,000 career point mark on February 25, 2021, in a semifinal Horizon League tournament game against Robert Morris. Davis scored 46 points, three shy of the school's single-game scoring mark, while connecting on 10 three-pointers.

Davis was named the 2022 Horizon League co-Player of the Year alongside Jamal Cain of Oakland. Davis also became the first player in Horizon League history to be named to the First Team All-Conference in four straight seasons. After that season, he entered the NCAA transfer portal, signaling an intent to explore other options for his final season of athletic eligibility. (Note: Normally, Davis would have exhausted his athletic eligibility after the 2021–22 season. However, the NCAA ruled that the 2020–21 season, which was extensively disrupted by COVID-19, would not be counted against the eligibility of any basketball player.) However, he remained open to returning to UDM for his final season, listing it as one of his five finalists on April 24. On May 9, he announced that he was returning to UDM.

During his final season at UDM in 2022–23, he reached several statistical milestones. First, on December 1, 2022, he became the Horizon League's all-time leading scorer, passing Alfredrick Hughes of Loyola Chicago. Nine days later, Davis became the 11th Division I men's player with 3,000 career points. Davis' next milestone came on January 14, 2023, when he passed Wofford's Fletcher Magee for the most career three-pointers in D-I men's history. Davis has since moved into second place on the all-time D-I men's scoring list behind LSU great Pete Maravich, passing Portland State's Freeman Williams on January 21, 2023. On February 27, 2023, Davis repeated as the Horizon League Player of the Year. In the process he became the first player in league history to be named to the all-league first team five times. Davis finished his career with 3,664 points, three points shy of the all-time scoring record held by Maravich.

== Professional career ==
=== Rip City Remix (2023–2024) ===
After going undrafted in the 2023 NBA draft, Davis joined the Portland Trail Blazers for the 2023 NBA Summer League and on October 2, 2023, he signed with them. However, he was waived on October 10 and on October 30, he joined the Rip City Remix of the NBA G League.

=== Stockton Kings (2024–present) ===
On October 18, 2024, Davis signed with the Sacramento Kings, but was waived that day. On October 27, he joined the Stockton Kings.

== Career statistics ==
Legend
GP	Games played	GS	Games started	MPG	Minutes per game
FG%	Field goal percentage	3P%	3-point field goal percentage	FT%	Free throw percentage
RPG	Rebounds per game	APG	Assists per game	SPG	Steals per game
BPG	Blocks per game	PPG	Points per game	**Bold**	Career high

*	Led NCAA Division I

=== College ===
Year	Team	GP	GS	MPG	FG%	3P%	FT%	RPG	APG	SPG	BPG	PPG
2018–19	Detroit Mercy	30	29	37.4	.400	.380	.857	3.1	3.6	.9	.0	26.1
2019–20	Detroit Mercy	30	30	36.7	.380	.324	.901	3.1	4.5	**1.7**	**.1**	24.3
2020–21	Detroit Mercy	22	22	**38.5**	.424	.372	**.917**	2.9	**4.8**	1.5	.0	24.0
2021–22	Detroit Mercy	29	29	37.0	**.429**	.379	.882	**3.6**	4.4	1.0	.0	23.9
2022–23	Detroit Mercy	**33**	**33**	37.4	.414	**.412**	.907	3.0	3.6	1.2	**.1**	**28.2***
Career		144	143	37.3	.408	.375	.892	3.2	4.1	1.3	.0	25.4

== Personal life ==
Davis' father, Mike Davis, is the previous head basketball coach at Detroit Mercy. Mike has coached various NCAA Division I teams, including Indiana, where he was an assistant to legendary coach Bob Knight before succeeding him. Davis' older brother, Mike Davis Jr., is an assistant coach for Detroit Mercy.

== See also ==
- List of NCAA Division I men's basketball season 3-point field goal leaders
- List of NCAA Division I men's basketball career 3-point scoring leaders
- List of NCAA Division I men's basketball season scoring leaders
- List of NCAA Division I men's basketball career scoring leaders
