= 1984–85 Louisiana Tech Bulldogs basketball team =

American college basketball season

1984–85 Louisiana Tech Bulldogs basketball

Southland Conference regular season champions Southland Conference tournament champions

NCAA tournament, Sweet Sixteen
- Conference: Southland Conference

Ranking
- Coaches: No. 8
- AP: No. 8
- Record: 29–3 (11–1 Southland)
- Head coach: Andy Russo (6th season)
- Home arena: Thomas Assembly Center

1984–85 Southland Conference men's basketball standings
	Conf.				Overall
Team	W		L	PCT	W		L	PCT
No. 8 Louisiana Tech †	11	–	1	.917	29	–	3	.906
McNeese State	9	–	3	.750	18	–	10	.643
Lamar	8	–	4	.667	20	–	12	.625
Arkansas State	6	–	6	.500	14	–	14	.500
Northeast Louisiana	4	–	8	.333	17	–	12	.586
Texas-Arlington	3	–	9	.250	12	–	16	.429
North Texas	1	–	11	.083	5	–	23	.179
† 1985 Southland tournament winner Rankings from AP poll

The 1984–85 Louisiana Tech Bulldogs basketball team represented Louisiana Tech University in Ruston, Louisiana for the 1984–85 season. Although other players on the team as well as head coach Andy Russo were well in the spotlight, the real star of the show for the Bulldogs that season was Karl Malone. Malone would lead the Bulldogs to their best season to date in program history as well as earning himself All-American honors. Following the season, Malone would enter the NBA draft, being selected 13th overall by the Utah Jazz. Spending the majority of his career with Utah, Malone would be named an NBA All-Star fourteen times, NBA Most Valuable Player twice, and be inducted into the Basketball Hall of fame in 2010.

== Roster ==
1984–85 Louisiana Tech Bulldogs men's basketball team
Players	Coaches
Pos. / # / Name / Height / Weight / Year / Hometown; F/C / 32 / Karl Malone / 6 ft 9 in (2.06 m) / 250 lb (113 kg) / Jr / Summerfield, Louisiana	Head coach: Andy Russo; Assistant coach(es) Legend: (C) Team captain; (S) Suspended; (I) Ineligible; (W) Walk-on; Injured; Current redshirt

== Schedule and results ==
Date time, TV	Rank^{#}	Opponent^{#}	Result	Record	Site city, state
Regular season
11/28/1984*		Concordia Lutheran	W 82–61	1–0	Thomas Assembly Center (3,150); Ruston, LA
12/1/1984*		at Centenary	W 78–62	2–0	Gold Dome (3,382); Shreveport, LA
12/3/1984*		Rice	W 75–63	3–0	Thomas Assembly Center (4,325); Ruston, LA
12/7/1984*		vs. No. 6 Louisville; Wendy's Classic	W 73–64	4–0	E.A. Diddle Arena (12,450); Bowling Green, KY
12/8/1984*		at Western Kentucky; Wendy's Classic	W 59–54	5–0	E.A. Diddle Arena (13,000); Bowling Green, KY
12/10/1984*		Ball State	W 73–59	6–0	Thomas Assembly Center (3,780); Ruston, LA
12/14/1984*		vs. Alabama State; Marshall Invitational	W 80–57	7–0	Cam Henderson Center (7,000); Huntington, WV
12/15/1984*		at Marshall; Marshall Invitational	W 69–63	8–0	Cam Henderson Center (8,446); Huntington, WV
12/17/1984*		at Northwestern State	W 78–50	9–0	Prather Coliseum (1,200); Natchitoches, LA
12/29/1984*	No. 19	at Oklahoma City; All-College Tournament	W 90–62	10–0	The Myriad (9,458); Oklahoma City, OK
12/30/1984*	No. 19	vs. No. 17 Oklahoma; All-College Tournament	L 72–84	10–1	The Myriad (10,287); Oklahoma City, OK
1/5/1985*	No. 18	Northwestern State	W 92–63	11–1	Thomas Assembly Center (6,120); Ruston, LA
1/7/1985*	No. 18	Centenary	W 83–65	12–1	Thomas Assembly Center (5,660); Ruston, LA
1/12/1985	No. 14	at Texas-Arlington	W 76–65	13–1	Texas Hall (2,500); Arlington, TX
1/17/1985	No. 12	North Texas	W 68–50	14–1	Thomas Assembly Center (3,370); Ruston, LA
1/19/1985*	No. 12	Southwestern Louisiana	W 94–74	15–1	Thomas Assembly Center (5,150); Ruston, LA
1/24/1985	No. 12	at McNeese State	W 88–69	16–1	Lake Charles Civic Center (6,700); Lake Charles, LA
1/26/1985	No. 12	at Lamar	L 64–72	16–2	Montagne Center (8,317); Beaumont, TX
1/31/1985	No. 15	Arkansas State	W 80–73	17–2	Thomas Assembly Center (3,360); Ruston, LA
2/2/1985	No. 15	at Northeast Louisiana	W 73-63	18–2	Fant-Ewing Coliseum (6,840); Monroe, LA
2/7/1985	No. 14	at Texas-Arlington	W 86-61	19–2	Thomas Assembly Center (3,720); Ruston, LA
2/9/1985	No. 14	at North Texas	W 90-72	20–2	UNT Coliseum (2,100); Denton, TX
2/14/1985*	No. 12	at Southwestern Louisiana	W 83-76	21–2	Blackham Coliseum (8,800); Lafayette, LA
2/18/2003	No. 12	McNeese State	W 59–58	22–2	Thomas Assembly Center (5,410); Ruston, LA
2/21/1985	No. 10	Lamar	W 73–65	23–2	Thomas Assembly Center (7,215); Ruston, LA
2/23/1985	No. 10	Arkansas State	W 100–67	24–2	ASU Field House (4,874); Jonesboro, AR
2/28/1985	No. 7	Northeast Louisiana	W 72-65	25–2 (11–1)	Thomas Assembly Center (6,090); Ruston, LA
Southland Conference tournament
3/6/1985	No. 8	Northeast Louisiana; Southland Conference tournament Semifinal	W 72-20 ^{OT}	26–2	Thomas Assembly Center (6,155); Ruston, LA
3/7/1985	No. 8	Lamar; Southland Conference Championship	W 70-69	27–2	Thomas Assembly Center (6,620); Ruston, LA
NCAA tournament
3/14/1985*	(5 MW) No. 8	vs. (12 MW) Pittsburgh; NCAA first round	W 78–54	28–2	Mabee Center (9,975); Tulsa, OK
3/16/1985*	(5 MW) No. 8	vs. (4 MW) Ohio State; NCAA round of 32	W 79–67	29–2	Mabee Center (10,575); Tulsa, OK
3/21/1985*	(5 MW) No. 8	vs. (1 MW) No. 4 Oklahoma; Midwest Regional semifinal – Sweet Sixteen	L 84–86 ^{OT}	29–3	Reunion Arena (17,007); Dallas, TX
*Non-conference game. ^{#}Rankings from AP Poll. (#) Tournament seedings in parentheses.

== Awards and honors ==
- Karl Malone – All-American

== NBA draft ==
Round	Pick	Player	NBA Club
1	13	Karl Malone	Utah Jazz
