= Gene Sullivan (basketball) =

American basketball coach, college athletics administrator

Gene Sullivan (April 21, 1931 – February 21, 2002) was an American basketball coach and collegiate athletic director.

Sullivan grew up on the Northwest Side of Chicago and attended the University of Notre Dame. After serving with the United States Army in the Korean War, he became a boys' basketball coach at Loyola Academy in Wilmette, Illinois, and guided them to three Chicago Catholic League titles between 1957 and 1967. In 1967, he became an assistant coach to Johnny Dee at the University of Notre Dame, and hoped to succeed Dee as head coach. Sullivan was a brilliant innovator. Austin Carr still holds the NCAA Tournament single game scoring record. As Sullivan said, I had one All-American and I needed get him 30 jump shots a game." When Dee retired in 1971, however, the school hired Digger Phelps as head coach, and a disappointed Sullivan spent the next few years writing a basketball book and running a limousine company.

From 1975 to 1978, Sullivan worked as DePaul University's athletic director. He then became athletic director at Loyola University Chicago, and took over as men's basketball coach in 1980. In 1985, his Loyola Ramblers, led by Alfredrick Hughes, reached the Sweet Sixteen of the NCAA Division I men's basketball tournament, where they lost to Georgetown University–their deepest NCAA Tournament run in 31 years. Sullivan left Loyola in 1989 with a 149-114 career record.

Sullivan spent the next few years as head of recreational programs for the Chicago Park District. He later worked as director of an anti-gang youth program with the Cook County State's Attorney's office and as a radio analyst for DePaul basketball radio broadcasts. He died of a staph infection at age 70 in February 2002.

Loyola returned to the NCAA Tournament in 2018 for the first time since Sullivan's team made its 1985 appearance. The school honored the team in 2009.

== Head coaching record ==
Record table
Season	Team	Overall	Conference	Standing	Postseason
Loyola–Chicago (Midwestern City/Midwestern Intercollegiate) (1980–1989)
1980–81	Loyola–Chicago	13–15	7–4	2nd	
1981–82	Loyola–Chicago	17–12	8–4	3rd	
1982–83	Loyola–Chicago	19–10	12–2	1st	
1983–84	Loyola–Chicago	20–9	10–4	2nd	
1984–85	Loyola–Chicago	27–6	13–1	1st	NCAA Division 1 Sweet 16
1985–86	Loyola–Chicago	13–16	7–5	4th	
1986–87	Loyola–Chicago	16–13	8–4	T–1st	
1987–88	Loyola–Chicago	13–16	3–7	5th	
1988–89	Loyola–Chicago	11–17	4–8	6th	
Loyola–Chicago:		149–114 (.567)	72–39 (.649)		
Total:		149–114 (.567)			
National champion Postseason invitational champion Conference regular season champion Conference regular season and conference tournament champion Division regular season champion Division regular season and conference tournament champion Conference tournament champion
