= Rashad Phillips =

American basketball player (born 1978)

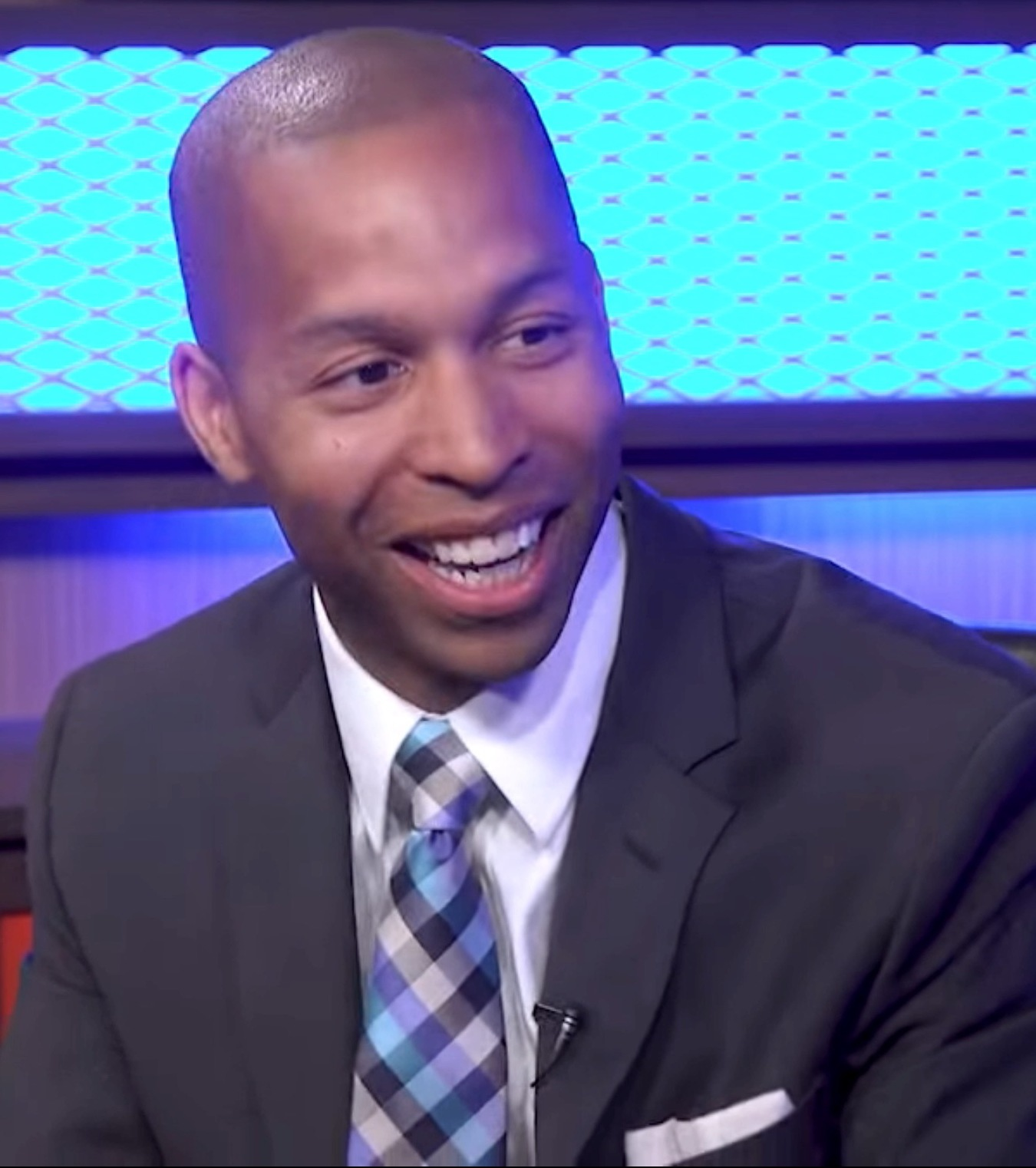
- Phillips in 2018

Personal information
- Born: May 5, 1978 (age 48) Detroit, Michigan, U.S.
- Listed height: 5 ft 9.25 in (1.76 m)
- Listed weight: 170 lb (77 kg)

Career information
- High school: Ferndale (Ferndale, Michigan)
- College: Detroit Mercy (1997–2001)
- NBA draft: 2001: undrafted
- Playing career: 2001–2010
- Position: Point guard / shooting guard

Career history
- 2001–2002: Mobile Revelers
- 2002: Aironi Novara
- 2002–2004: ALM Évreux Basket
- 2004–2005: Tekelspor
- 2005–2006: Makedonikos
- 2006: Dakota Wizards
- 2006: İstanbulspor
- 2007: Porto
- 2007: SK Valmiera
- 2007: Perth Wildcats
- 2008–2009: Al Ansar
- 2010: Gießen 46ers

Career highlights
- Frances Pomeroy Naismith Award (2001); 2× MCC Player of the Year (2000, 2001); 3× First-team All-MCC (1999–2001); 2× MCC All-Defensive Team (1999, 2000); MCC Newcomer of the Year (1998); No. 3 retired by Detroit Mercy Titans

Rashad Keith Phillips (born May 5, 1978) is an American former professional basketball player. At a height of 5'9 1/4" (1.76 m) tall, and a weight of 170 pounds (77 kg), he played at the guard position.

== Early life ==
Phillips, a native of the North Central section of Detroit, Michigan, grew up in a rough neighborhood.

In the fall of 1992, Phillips entered Ferndale High School, in Ferndale, Michigan, as a 4 ft 8 in (1.42 m) freshman. At first, he was told he was too small to be a basketball player, but he quickly proved he could play, despite his stature, and ended up becoming one of the first four-year varsity starters in school history. By the time Phillips was a senior, in 1995–96, he had only grown to 5 ft 7 in (1.70 m). Phillips, however, still averaged approximately 25 points, seven assists and four steals per game, en route to being named Oakland County's best player. He was also invited to play in the Magic Roundball Classic, an annual all-star high school basketball game, where the best players in the country are selected to participate, as an alternate, and played for the West in place of an injured Mateen Cleaves. The game was held at The Palace of Auburn Hills, in Detroit, and Phillips earned the West's Most Valuable Player (MVP) award after out-performing Kobe Bryant. Bryant was the number one high school recruit at the time, and would be a first-round draft choice in the 1996 NBA draft, just three months later. Phillips' performance caused him to become a heavily recruited prospect, but by then, he had already committed to play at the University of Detroit Mercy.

== College career ==
Phillips stood at 5 ft 8 in (1.73 m) when he entered University of Detroit Mercy. He averaged 10.0 points per game in his first season, and was named the Midwestern Collegiate Conference's (MCC) Newcomer of the Year. The Titans were conference regular season champions, behind a 12–2 MCC record, and earned a berth into the 1998 NCAA tournament. After upsetting St. John's in the first round, Detroit lost in the round of 32, to a strong Purdue squad, ending their year with an overall record of 25–6.

During his sophomore season, in 1998–99, he increased his average to 15.7 points per game, which would be the first of three consecutive years in which he led Detroit in that category. The Titans repeated as regular season champions, and also won the MCC tournament, which gave them an automatic berth into the 1999 NCAA tournament. Phillips played a big role in 12th-seeded Detroit's upset over 5th-seeded UCLA, by a score of 56–53, during the opening round game. Just like the season before, when they scored a major upset to open the tournament, Detroit then found itself on the losing end in the round of 32, this time at the hands of 4th-seeded Ohio State. At the end of the 25–6 season, Phillips was named to the All-MCC First Team.

As a junior, in 1999–2000, the Titans failed to qualify for any postseason tournaments, since they only finished with a 20–12 (8–6 MCC) record. Phillips' scoring average, meanwhile, rose to a career-best 23.0 points per game, while he also finished in the top 10 in the nation. His average led the Midwestern Collegiate Conference, while his 735 total points scored is still the fourth-highest single season mark in school history. He repeated as both an All-MCC First Team selection, as well as an All-Defensive Team selection. Phillips was named the MCC Men's Basketball Player of the Year, becoming the first Detroit Titan ever to be honored as the league's Newcomer of the Year and Player of the Year during his career.

In 2000–01, the Titans finished in second place in the MCC, behind Butler, with a 10–4 record. Phillips averaged 22.4 points per game, tops in the MCC, while leading the school to a fourth-place finish in the 2001 National Invitation Tournament – their highest-ever finish in a major postseason tournament. After losing to Alabama in the semifinals, Detroit then played Memphis for the NIT Third Place game, but also fell short in that game, placing fourth. On the year, Phillips set still-standing single season school-records of 785 total points scored, and a 91.6% accuracy from the free throw line. Additionally, he finished with the fourth-highest free throw percentage in all of NCAA Division I. Phillips also set many school top ten records that season, including a career-high of 41 points scored against UW–Green Bay, in January. The Midwestern Collegiate Conference honored him with a third consecutive All-MCC First Team selection, as well as his second straight MCC Player of the Year award. He became just the third player ever to lead the conference in scoring multiple times, and he ended his collegiate career with 2,319 points scored, which stood as the Detroit Mercy record for over 20 years until Antoine Davis broke it in 2022. His 541 made free throws still top the program's record book, and his 348 made three-pointers were also a program record until Davis surpassed him in 2021.

Phillips garnered national acclaim for his season and career, not just conference awards. The Associated Press named him as an Honorable Mention All-American, and the Naismith Memorial Basketball Hall of Fame presented him as the 2001 Frances Pomeroy Naismith Award winner, given annually to the best Division I men's basketball player, who is 6 ft 0 in (1.83 m) or shorter.

== Professional career ==
Phillips was chosen to play in the Portsmouth Invitational Tournament (PIT), after the school year ended. The PIT is composed of the top 64 recently graduated basketball players in the country, and is an opportunity for them to showcase their talent, heading into the National Basketball Association (NBA) Draft. At the 49th installment of the tournament, Phillips earned MVP honors, after averaging 21.3 points and 5.3 assists per game, in three games played.

The Mobile Revelers, of the NBA Development League, selected Phillips in the first round (7th overall), in the 2001 NBDL Draft. He played the entire first season in NBDL history with the Revelers, while appearing in 53 total games (including 27 starts). He averaged 12.5 points and 3.7 assists per game, as Mobile finished with a 30–26 record, good for fourth place in the eight team league. The Revelers lost in the playoffs, two games to one, in a best-of-three format, to the North Charleston Lowgators.

For the next seven years, Phillips became somewhat of a journeyman. He played in over eight leagues, both domestically and internationally, and rarely stayed with one team for more than a season. His stops included leagues in Australia, France, Greece, Italy, Latvia, Portugal, Saudi Arabia, and Turkey. Three different times he was his league's scoring champion, and once was its MVP. He retired from playing professional basketball in 2010 after a stint with the Gießen 46ers.
