= Kenny Miller (basketball) =

American basketball player (born 1967)

Personal information
- Born: December 27, 1967 (age 58) Evergreen Park, Illinois, U.S.
- Listed height: 6 ft 8 in (2.03 m)

Career information
- High school: Morgan Park (Chicago, Illinois)
- College: Loyola Chicago (1987–1988)
- NBA draft: 1990: undrafted
- Playing career: 1990–2003
- Position: Center

Career history
- 1990–1991: Rapid City Thrillers
- 1991: Rockford Lightning
- 1991–1992: Grand Rapids Hoops
- 1992: Albany Patroons
- 1992: New Jersey Jammers
- 1992–1993: Dinamo Sassari
- 1993–1994: Fenerbahçe
- 1994–1997: Unicaja Málaga
- 1997: Galatasaray
- 1997–1999: Unicaja Málaga
- 1999–2000: CB Gran Canaria
- 2000–2001: Unicaja Málaga
- 2001–2002: CB Gran Canaria
- 2002–2003: Olympiacos
- 2003: Tenerife CB

Career highlights
- NCAA rebounding leader (1988); Second-team All-MCC (1988); MCC Rookie of the Year (1988); MCC All-Freshman team (1988)

Kenneth Allen Miller Tolbert (born December 27, 1967) is an American former professional basketball player. He attended Morgan Park High School on Chicago's South Side. Miller (a.k.a. The Big Mil) was the 1988 NCAA Division I men's basketball season rebounding leader, the first freshman in the history of the NCAA to do it. In 2001, he received dual citizenship with Spain.

== College career ==
Miller played at Loyola University where he won First Team All-MCC (Midwest Collegiate Conference), MCC Newcomer of the Year and the 1988 rebounding title.

== Professional career ==
Miller played in the Continental Basketball Association, Global Basketball Association, NBA, Paris Basket Racing), Banco di Sardegna, Fenerbahçe, Galatasaray, Unicaja 9 season, Tenerife (1 season), UB La Palma and Olympiacos. In the off-season he played in Puerto Rico (Carolina league co-champion) and Bayamon Leagues, in Venezuela (Toros), Santo Domingo, Ecuador and Chicago Summer league.

Miller was voted the best imported player for Unicaja of Malaga. He led and held the record in field goal percentage at 72.32 in the 1997–98 season. Miller held the club record for games played (225).
