= Horizon League Men's Basketball Player of the Year =

College basketball award

- Awarded for: the most outstanding basketball player in the Horizon League
- Country: United States

History
- First award: 1980
- Most recent: DeSean Goode, Robert Morris

The Horizon League Men's Basketball Player of the Year is an award given to the Horizon League's most outstanding player. The award was first given following the 1979–80 season, the first year of the conference's existence. Seven players have won the award multiple times: Byron Larkin, Brian Grant, Rashad Phillips, Alfredrick Hughes, Keifer Sykes, Loudon Love, and Antoine Davis. Hughes, unlike the other four who each won twice, was awarded the player of the year on three occasions.

There have only been three ties in the award's history (1981, 1983, 2022). Butler, which left for the Atlantic 10 Conference in 2012 and is now in the Big East Conference, has seven recipients, which is tied for the most all-time with Detroit Mercy. Four current members of the Horizon League have never had a winner – IU Indy, Northern Illinois, Purdue Fort Wayne, and Youngstown State. However, these schools include three of the conference's most recent arrivals—IU Indy joined in 2017; Purdue Fort Wayne joined in 2020; and Northern Illinois, which had no winner during its first conference tenure from 1994–1997, rejoined in 2026. The only long-established member without a winner is Youngstown State, which joined in 2002.

== Key ==
†	Co-Players of the Year
*	Awarded a national player of the year award that same season: UPI College Basketball Player of the Year (1954–55 to 1995–96); Oscar Robertson Trophy (1958–59 to present); Naismith College Player of the Year (1968–69 to present); John R. Wooden Award (1976–77 to present)
Player (X)	Denotes the number of times the player has been awarded the Horizon League Player of the Year award at that point

== Winners ==
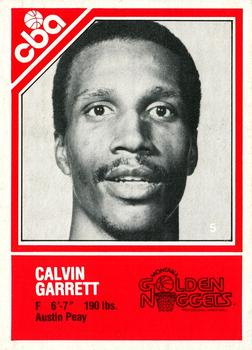
Calvin Garrett, Oral Roberts, 1980

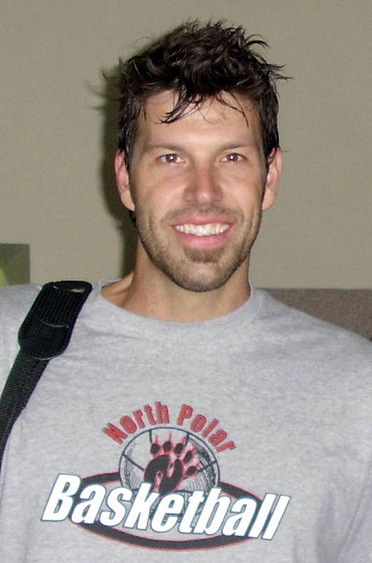
Jeff Nordgaard, Green Bay, 1996

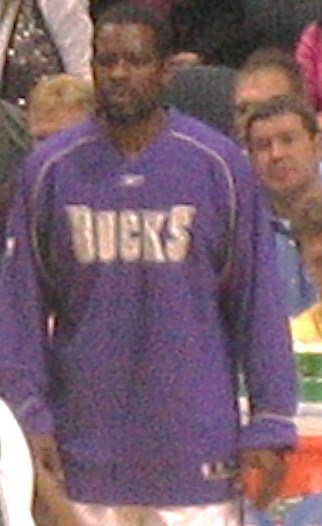
Jermaine Jackson, Detroit Mercy, 1999

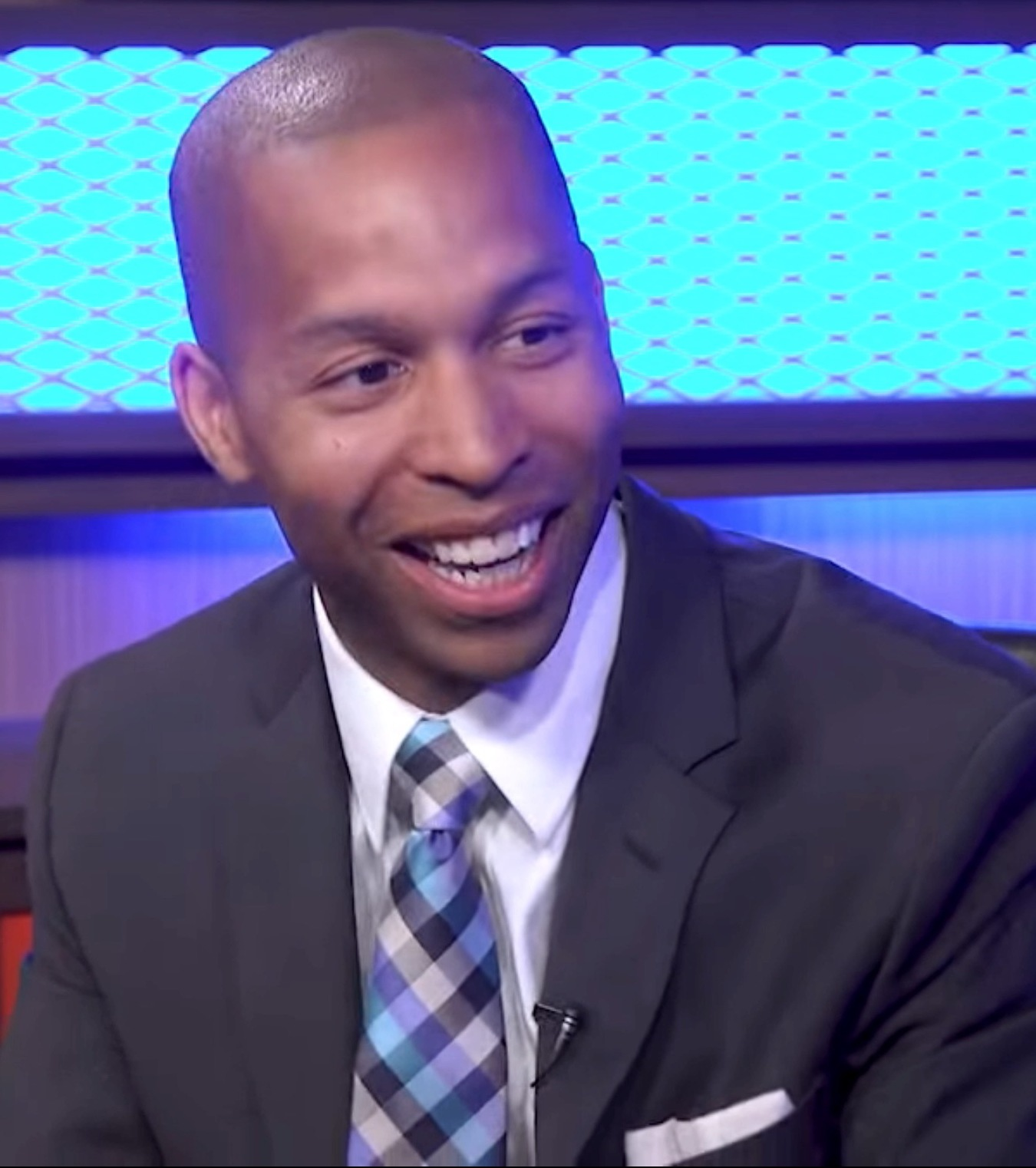
Rashad Phillips, Detroit Mercy, 2000 and 2001

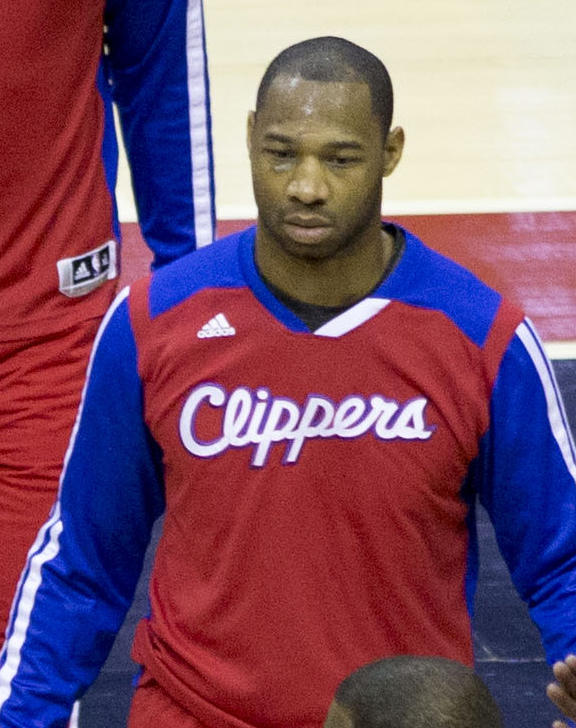
Willie Green, Detroit Mercy, 2003

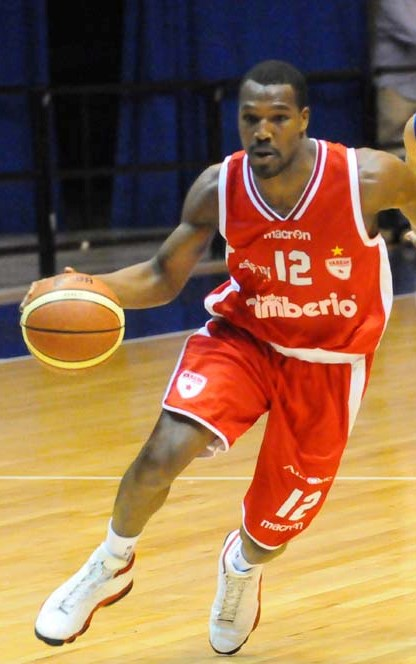
Mike Green, Butler, 2008

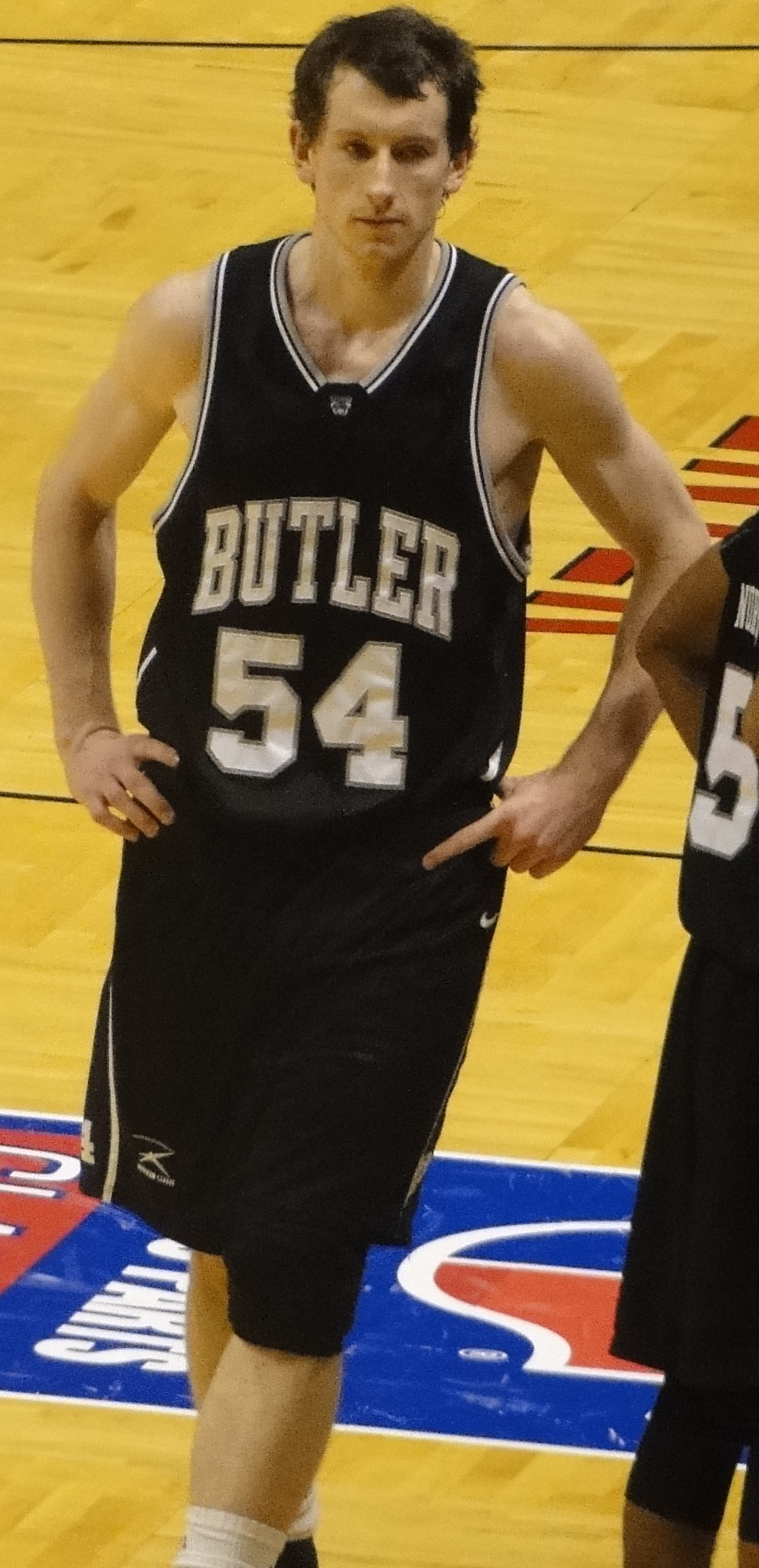
Matt Howard, Butler, 2009

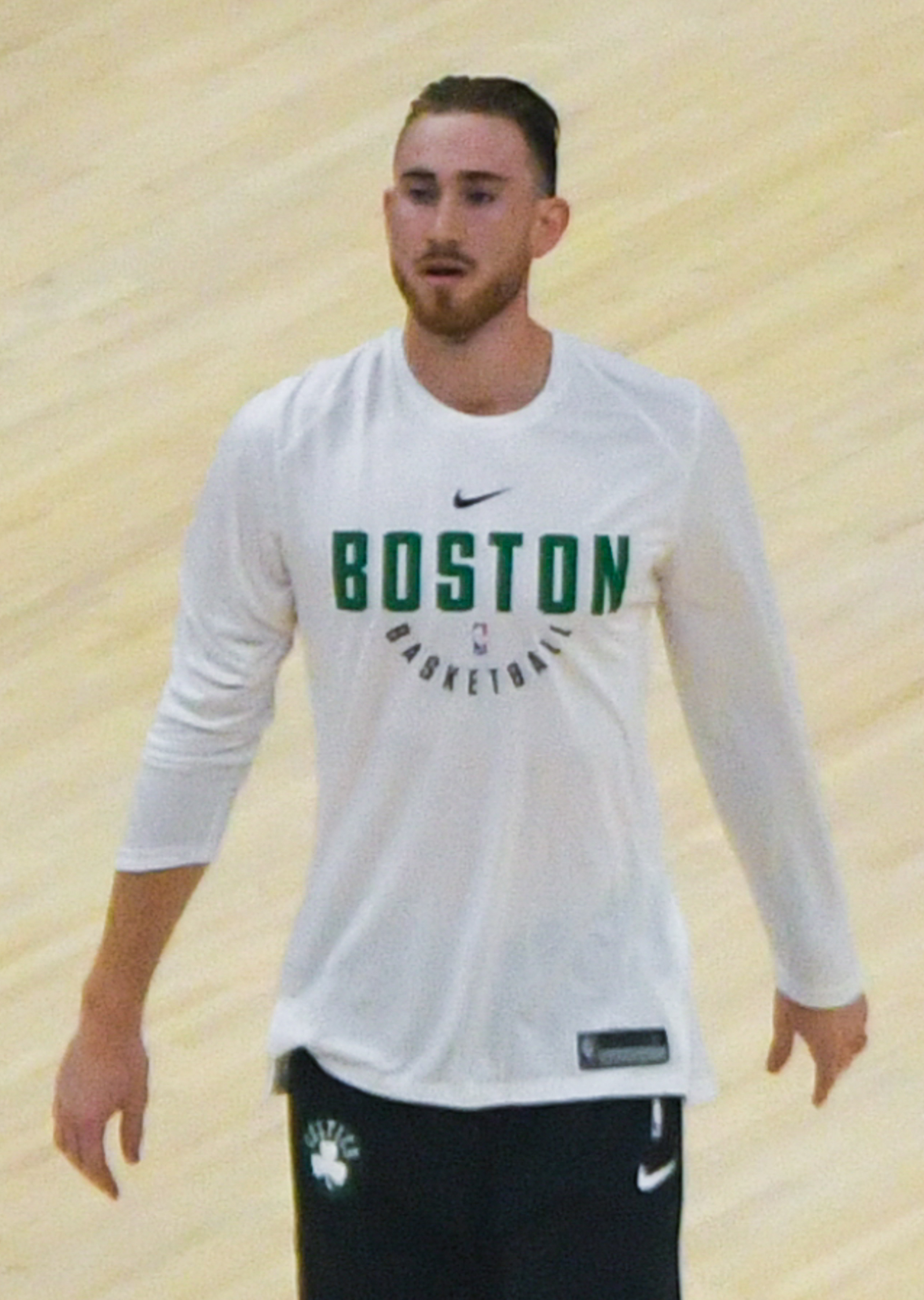
Gordon Hayward, Butler, 2010

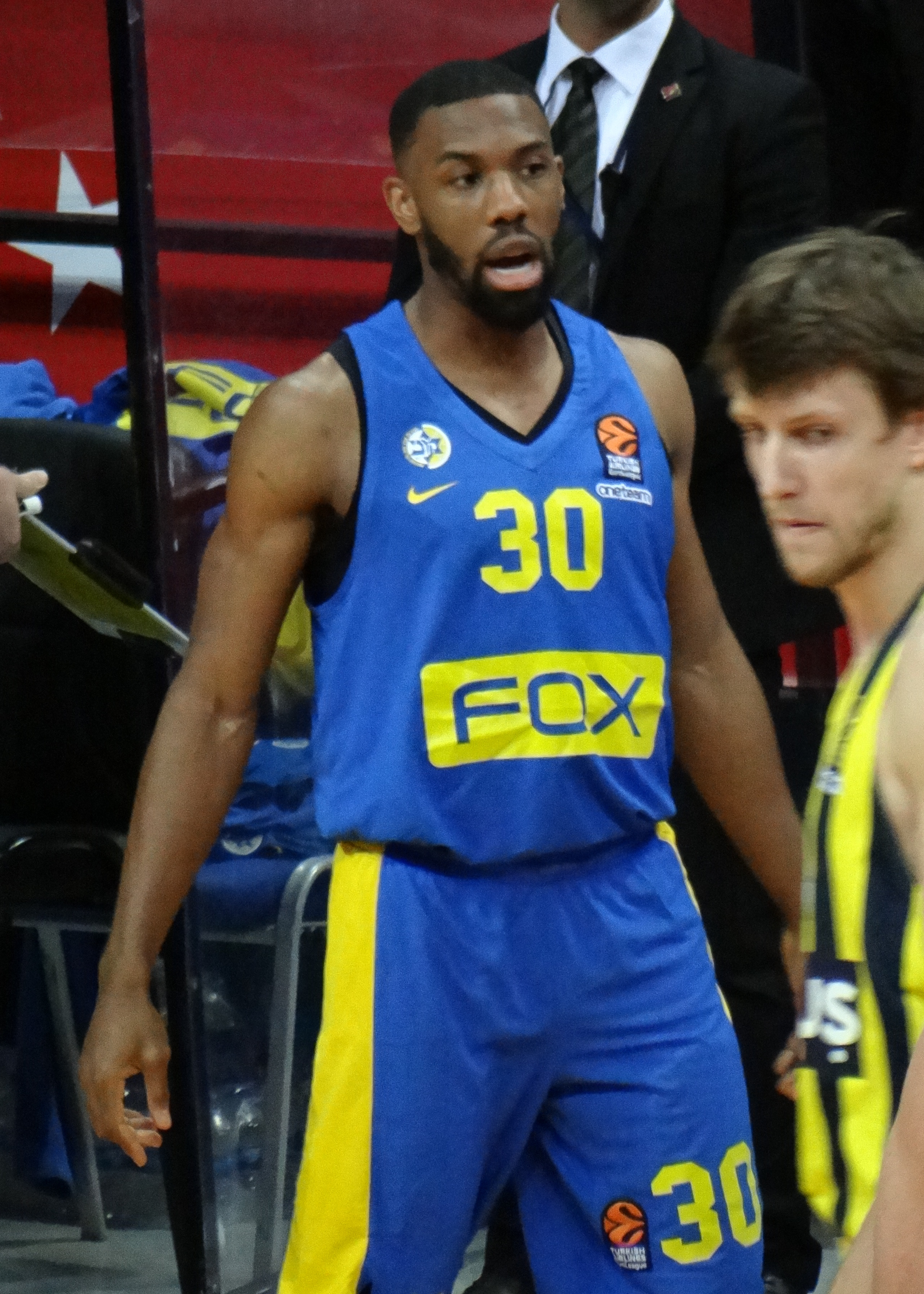
Norris Cole, Cleveland State, 2011

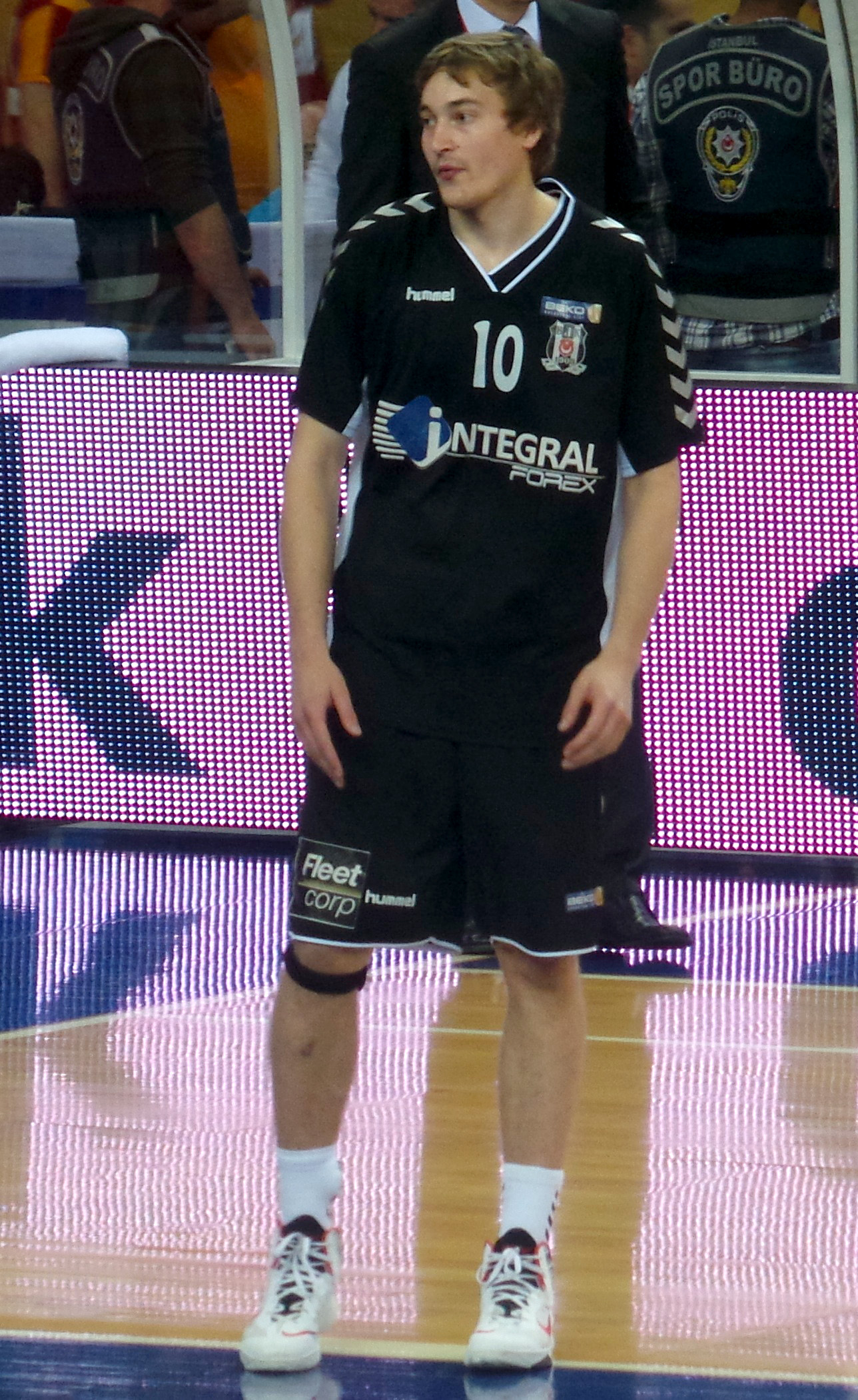
Ryan Broekhoff, Valparaiso, 2012

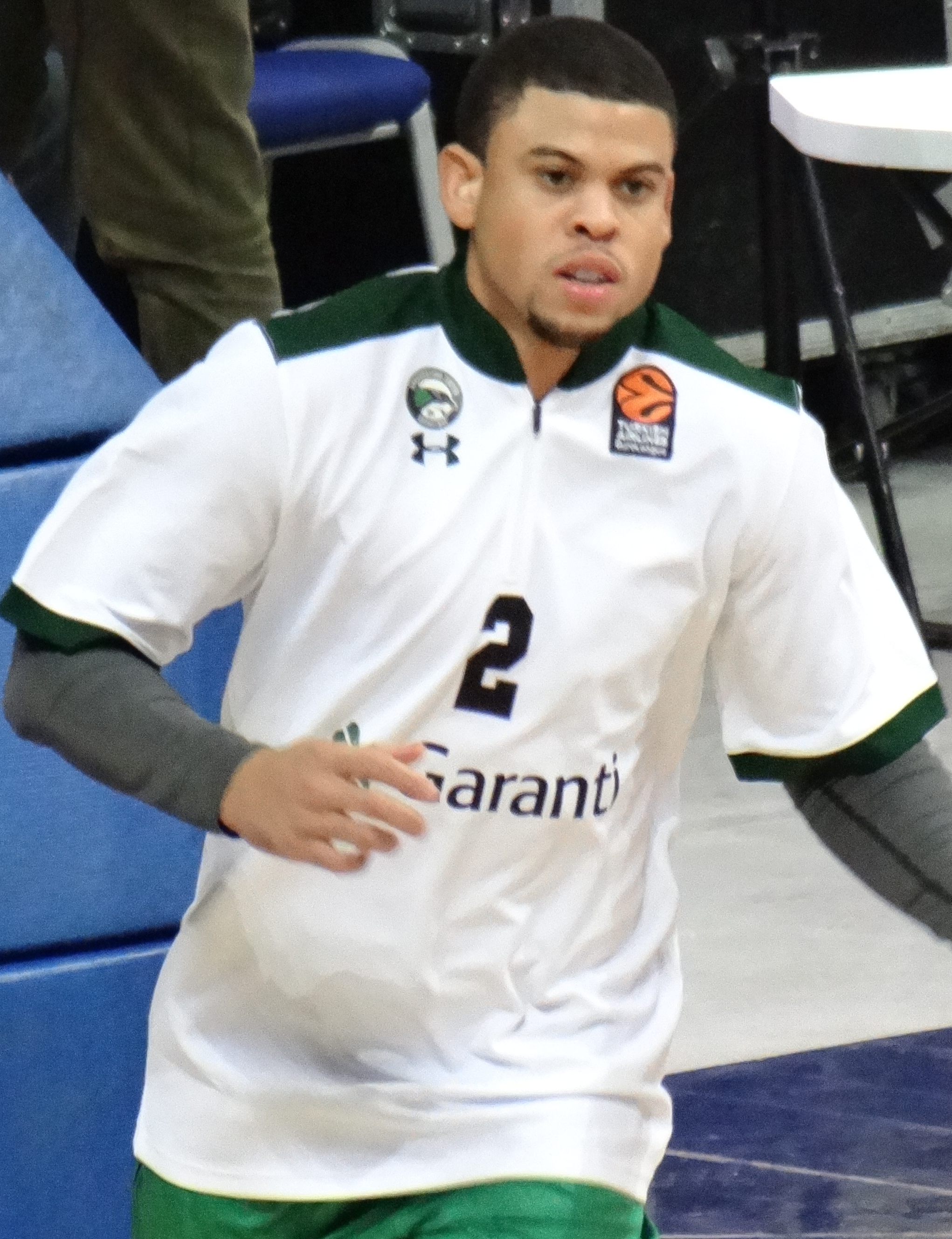
Ray McCallum Jr., Detroit Mercy, 2013

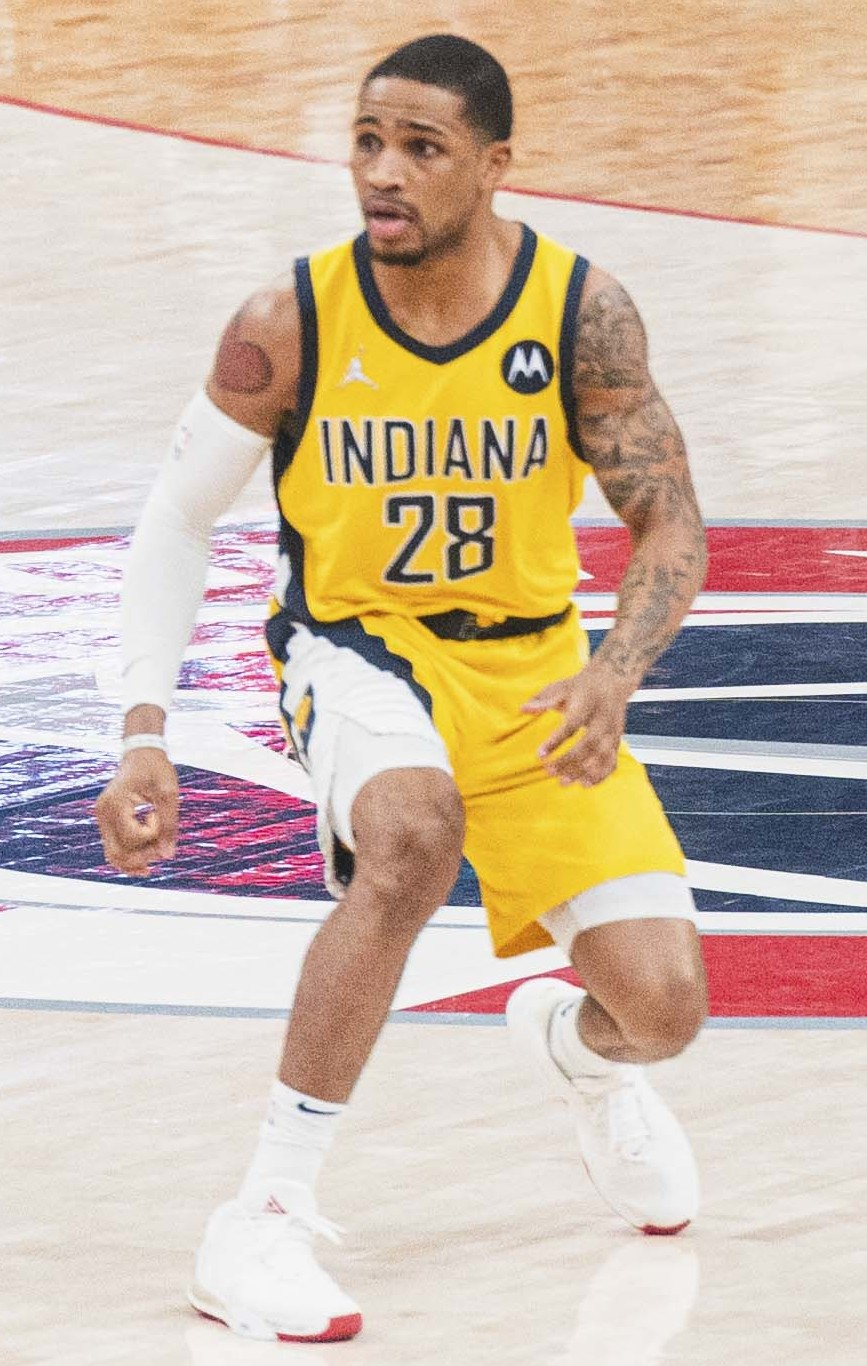
Keifer Sykes, Green Bay, 2014 and 2015

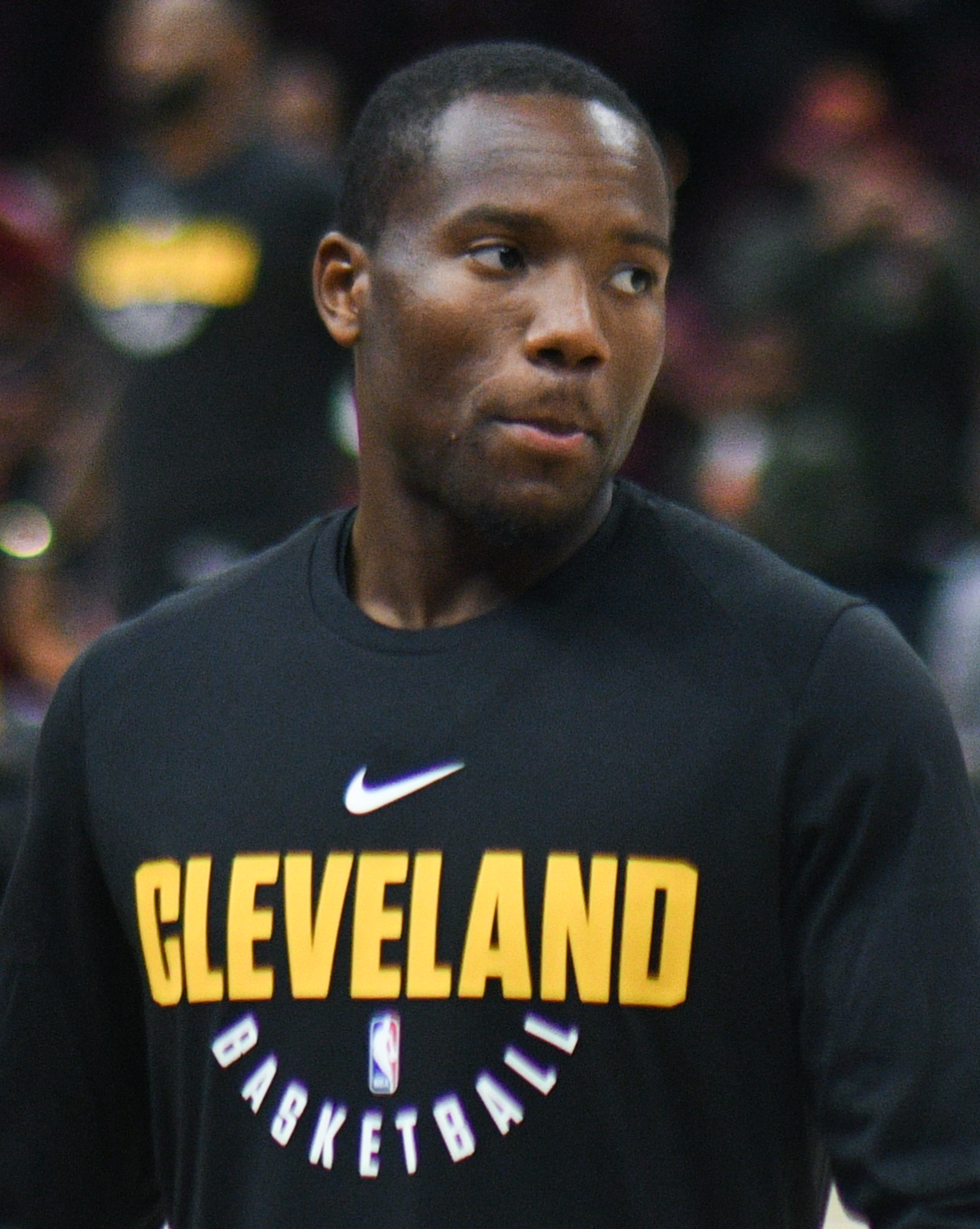
Kay Felder, Oakland, 2016

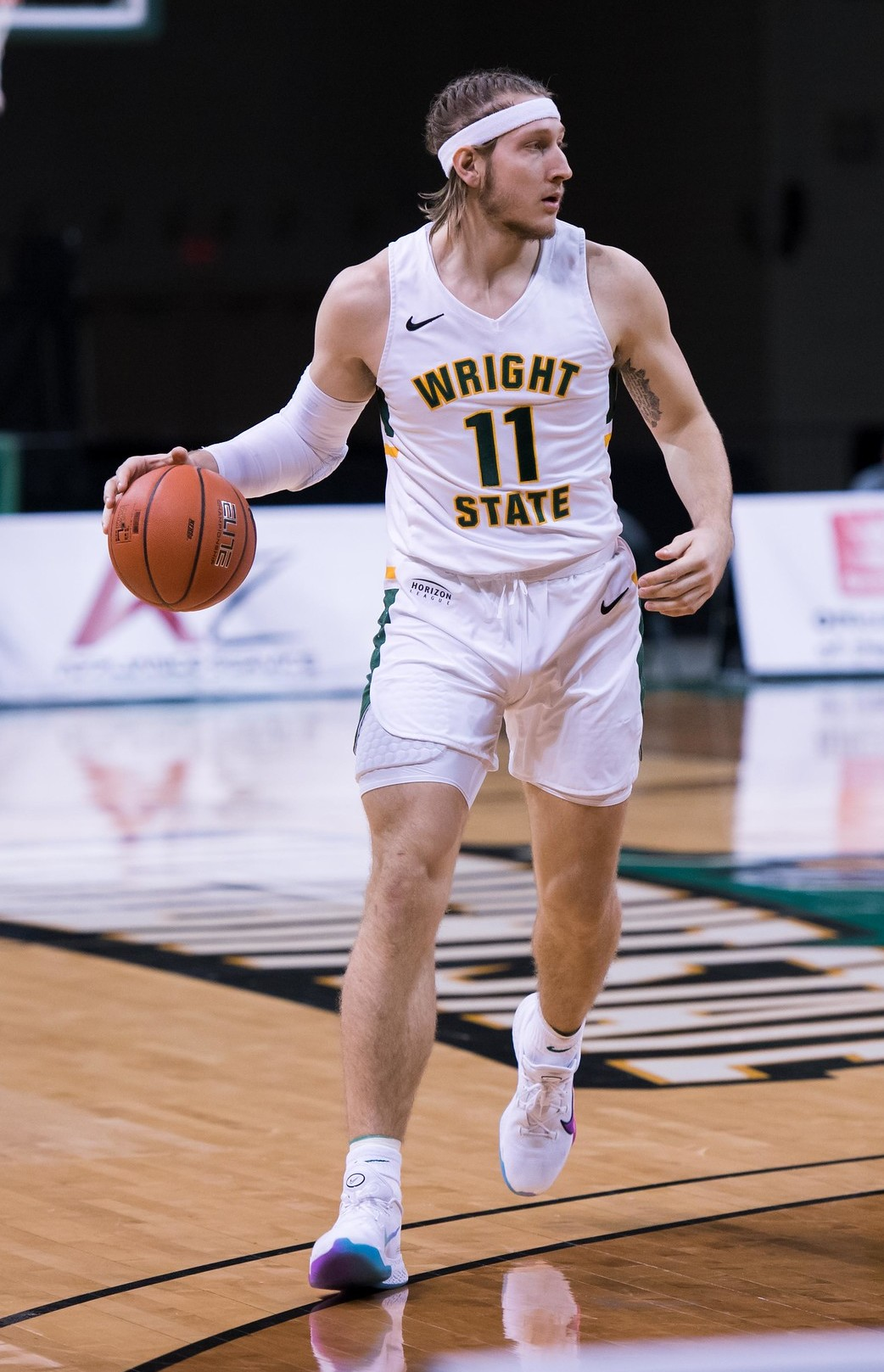
Loudon Love, Wright State, 2020 and 2021

Season	Player	School	Position	Class	Reference
1979–80	Calvin Garrett	Oral Roberts	F	Senior	
1980–81^{†}	Darius Clemons	Loyola Chicago	PG	Junior	
1980–81^{†}	Rubin Jackson	Oklahoma City	F	Junior	
1981–82	Wayne Sappleton	Loyola Chicago	PF	Senior	
1982–83^{†}	Mark Acres	Oral Roberts	C	Sophomore	
1982–83^{†}	Alfredrick Hughes	Loyola Chicago	SF	Sophomore	
1983–84	Alfredrick Hughes (2)	Loyola Chicago	SF	Junior	
1984–85	Alfredrick Hughes (3)	Loyola Chicago	SF	Senior	
1985–86	Byron Larkin	Xavier	SG	Sophomore	
1986–87	Andre Moore	Loyola Chicago	PF	Senior	
1987–88	Byron Larkin (2)	Xavier	SG	Senior	
1988–89	Scott Haffner	Evansville	PG	Senior	
1989–90	Tyrone Hill	Xavier	PF	Senior	
1990–91	Darin Archbold	Butler	SG	Junior	
1991–92	Parrish Casebier	Evansville	PF	Sophomore	
1992–93	Brian Grant	Xavier	PF / C	Junior	
1993–94	Brian Grant (2)	Xavier	PF / C	Senior	
1994–95	Sherell Ford	UIC	F	Senior	
1995–96	Jeff Nordgaard	Green Bay	SF	Senior	
1996–97	Jon Neuhouser	Butler	PF	Junior	
1997–98	Mark Miller	UIC	G	Senior	
1998–99	Jermaine Jackson	Detroit Mercy	SG	Senior	
1999–00	Rashad Phillips	Detroit Mercy	PG	Junior	
2000–01	Rashad Phillips (2)	Detroit Mercy	PG	Senior	
2001–02	Rylan Hainje	Butler	SG	Senior	
2002–03	Willie Green	Detroit Mercy	SG	Senior	
2003–04	Dylan Page	Milwaukee	PF / C	Senior	
2004–05	Ed McCants	Milwaukee	SG	Senior	
2005–06	Brandon Polk	Butler	F	Senior	
2006–07	DaShaun Wood	Wright State	PG	Senior	
2007–08	Mike Green	Butler	SG	Senior	
2008–09	Matt Howard	Butler	PF	Sophomore	
2009–10	Gordon Hayward	Butler	SG	Sophomore	
2010–11	Norris Cole	Cleveland State	PG	Senior	
2011–12	Ryan Broekhoff	Valparaiso	SF	Junior	
2012–13	Ray McCallum Jr.	Detroit Mercy	PG	Junior	
2013–14	Keifer Sykes	Green Bay	PG	Junior	
2014–15	Keifer Sykes (2)	Green Bay	PG	Senior	
2015–16	Kay Felder	Oakland	PG	Junior	
2016–17	Alec Peters	Valparaiso	SF	Senior	
2017–18	Kendrick Nunn	Oakland	SG	Senior	
2018–19	Drew McDonald	Northern Kentucky	PF / C	Senior	
2019–20	Loudon Love	Wright State	C	Junior	
2020–21	Loudon Love (2)	Wright State	C	Senior	
2021–22^{†}	Jamal Cain	Oakland	PF	Graduate	
2021–22^{†}	Antoine Davis	Detroit Mercy	SG	Senior	
2022–23	Antoine Davis (2)	Detroit Mercy	SG	Graduate	
2023–24	Trey Townsend	Oakland	SF	Senior	
2024–25	Alvaro Folgueiras	Robert Morris	PF	Sophomore	
2025–26	DeSean Goode	Robert Morris	PF	Sophomore	

== Winners by school ==
School (year joined)	Winners	Years
Butler (1980) (Note: Butler University left after 2011–12 to join the Atlantic 10 Conference (A-10), and joined the Big East Conference in 2013.)	7	1991, 1997, 2002, 2006, 2008, 2009, 2010
Detroit Mercy (1981)	7	1999, 2000, 2001, 2003, 2013, 2022^{†}, 2023
Loyola Chicago (1980) (Note: Loyola University Chicago left after 2012–13 to join the Missouri Valley Conference (MVC), and joined the A-10 in July 2022.)	6	1981^{†}, 1982, 1983^{†}, 1984, 1985, 1987
Xavier (1980) (Note: Xavier University left after 1995–96 to join the A-10, and joined the Big East in 2013.)	5	1986, 1988, 1990, 1993, 1994
Oakland (2013)	4	2016, 2018, 2022^{†}, 2024
Green Bay (1995)	3	1996, 2014, 2015
Wright State (1995)	3	2007, 2020, 2021
Evansville (1980) (Note: The University of Evansville left after 1993–94 to join the MVC.)	2	1989, 1992
Milwaukee (1995)	2	2004, 2005
Oral Roberts (1980) (Note: Oral Roberts University left after 1986–87 to join the Mid-Continent Conference (now known as The Summit League). Apart from a two-season stint in the Southland Conference from 2012 to 2014, it has remained in The Summit League.)	2	1980, 1983^{†}
Robert Morris (2020)	2	2025, 2026
UIC (1995) (Note: The University of Illinois Chicago left after the 2021–22 season to join the MVC.)	2	1995, 1998
Valparaiso (2008) (Note: Valparaiso University left after 2016–17 to join the MVC.)	2	2012, 2017
Cleveland State (1995)	1	2011
Northern Kentucky (2015)	1	2019
Oklahoma City (1980) (Note: Oklahoma City University left after 1984–85 to join the Sooner Athletic Conference in the NAIA.)	1	1981^{†}
IU Indy (2017) (Note: Joined the Horizon League as IUPUI, reflecting its then-current affiliation with Indiana University–Purdue University Indianapolis. The athletic program transferred to the new Indiana University Indianapolis upon the dissolution of IUPUI on July 1, 2024, with a primary athletic branding as IU Indy.)	0	—
Northern Illinois (1994/2026) (Note: Northern Illinois first joined the conference in 1994, left in 1997, and rejoined in 2026.)	0	—
Purdue Fort Wayne (2020)	0	—
Youngstown State (2002)	0	—
