= Alumni Gym (Loyola University Chicago) =

Sports venue in Chicago, Illinois

Coordinates: 42.0004°N 87.6598°W

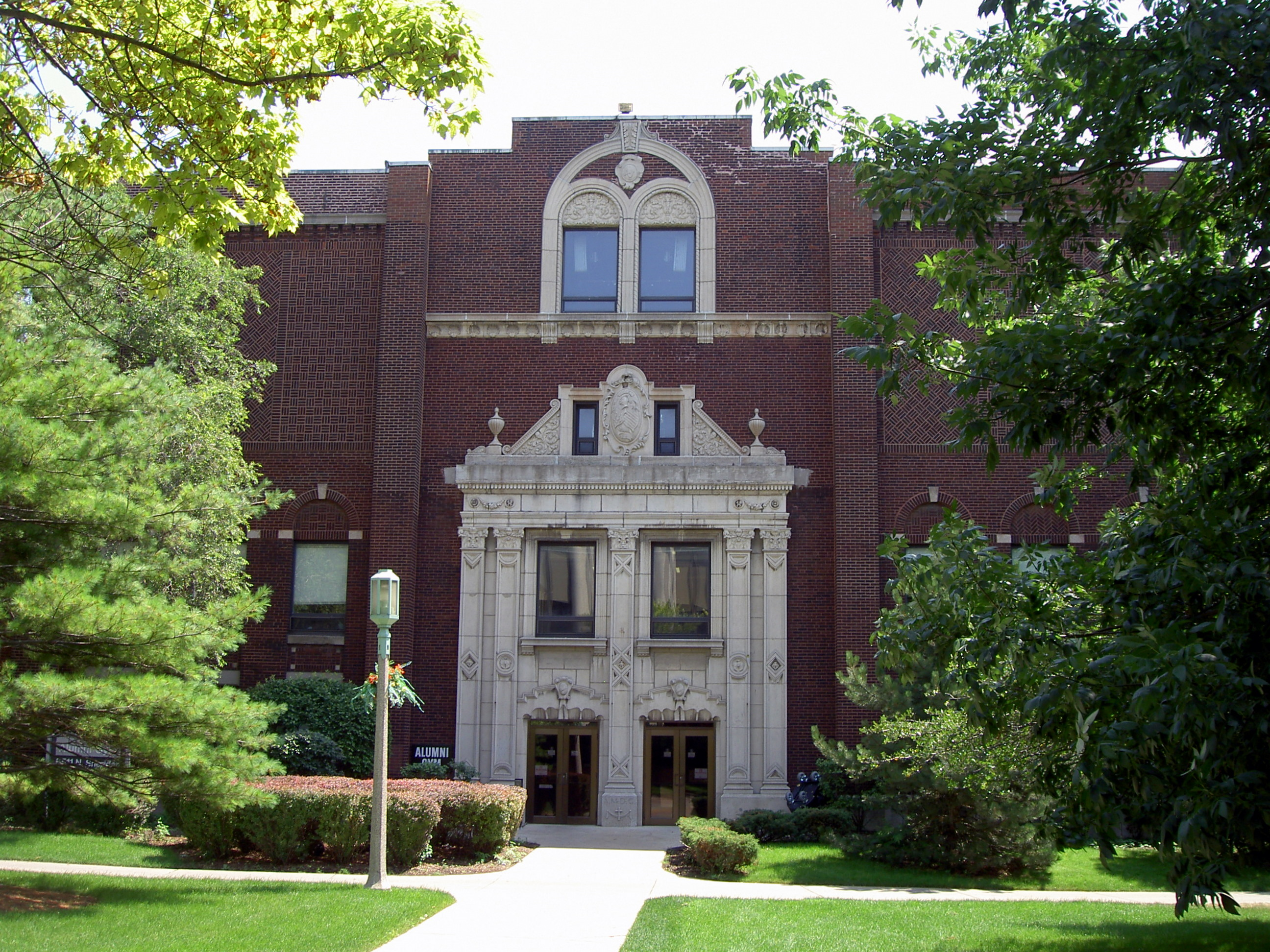
Alumni Gym

Alumni Gym was a 2,000-person capacity structure on the campus of Loyola University Chicago. It served as the home of the Loyola Ramblers men's and women's basketball and volleyball programs, as well as the Loyola University Department of Intercollegiate Athletics. It is the former home of the Loyola Ramblers basketball team, which last played in Alumni Gym in 1996. The basketball team moved to the 5,200-seat Joseph J. Gentile Center at the beginning of the 1996–97 season. From 1924 to 1941, Loyola hosted the National Catholic Interscholastic Basketball Tournament in Alumni Gym. The facility hosted the Semifinals and Championship game of the 2005 and 2006 Midwestern Intercollegiate Volleyball Association Championship.

The final intercollegiate game at Alumni Gym was on April 27, 2011. The Loyola men's volleyball team defeated Quincy University 3–1 in the semifinals of the Midwestern Intercollegiate Volleyball Association tournament in front of an announced crowd of 424 people.

The building was demolished in the summer of 2011 to make way for a new student union on campus.
