= Andre Moore =

American-Australian former basketball player (born 1964)

Personal information
- Born: 2 July 1964 (age 62) Chicago, Illinois, U.S.
- Listed height: 6 ft 9 in (2.06 m)
- Listed weight: 215 lb (98 kg)

Career information
- High school: Carver (Chicago, Illinois)
- College: Loyola Chicago (1984–1987)
- NBA draft: 1987: 2nd round, 31st overall pick
- Drafted by: Denver Nuggets
- Playing career: 1987–2001
- Position: Power forward
- Number: 31, 41, 53

Career history
- 1987: Denver Nuggets
- 1987: Milwaukee Bucks
- 1987–1988: Philadelphia Aces
- 1988–1989: Tulsa Fast Breakers
- 1990–1994: Brisbane Bullets
- 1995: Hobart Devils
- 1999–2001: Cairns Taipans

Career highlights
- All-NBL First Team (1990); All-NBL Third Team (1993); MCC Player of the Year (1987); 2× First-team All-MCC (1986, 1987); Second-team All-MCC (1985)
- Stats at NBA.com
- Stats at Basketball Reference

Andre Matthew Moore (born 2 July 1964), is an American-Australian former professional basketball player. As a 6 ft 9 in (205 cm) power forward, he played in the National Basketball Association (NBA) for both the Milwaukee Bucks and the Denver Nuggets during the 1987–88 season. He also played in Australia for the Brisbane Bullets, Hobart Devils and Cairns Taipans.

== High school ==
Moore played for Carver High School in Chicago, and represented the school at the 1982 Tribune-McDonald's Prep Cage Classic, where his City All-Star team lost to a Suburban All-Star team led by Kevin Duckworth. Moore led the city team with 17 points. Later that year, he was named to the Illinois All-Star team, which defeated Indiana's All-Stars in a game held in Gary, Indiana.

== College ==
Moore attended the University of Illinois-Chicago from 1982 to 1983, but did not play for the Flames due to ineligibility. He then transferred to Loyola University Chicago where he had to again sit out the season (1983–84) due to being a transfer student. His next three seasons with the Loyola University Ramblers saw Moore play 85 games and average 16.5 points, 10.9 rebounds and 2.1 blocks per game. Loyola reached the Sweet 16 of the 1985 NCAA Men's Division I Basketball Tournament, but lost to Patrick Ewing's Georgetown University team, 65–53. Moore had 19 points in the game. In his senior year at Loyola (1986–87), Moore was the Midwestern Collegiate Conference Men's Basketball Player of the Year.

== Early professional career ==
Moore was drafted by the Denver Nuggets in the 2nd round of the 1987 NBA draft. In 10 games with the Nuggets and Milwaukee Bucks, he averaged 2.4 points, 1.4 rebounds and 0.6 assists per game. Afterwards, he played in Spain, France, the United States Basketball League, and the Continental Basketball Association. In the CBA, he appeared in nine games for the Tulsa Fast Breakers, who were coached by former NBA player Henry Bibby.

== Australia ==
Moore then embarked on a career in Australia in the National Basketball League. He first signed with the Brisbane Bullets, who had recruited him while he was in the CBA, and helped them to the 1990 NBL Grand Final series against the Perth Wildcats. His teammates on Brisbane included fellow Americans Derek Rucker and Leroy Loggins. Moore's outstanding play in the NBL saw him selected to the 1990 All-NBL Team and several NBL All-Star Games. The 1990 season was arguably his strongest year, as he averaged 26.9 points, 12.6 rebounds, and two blocks per game while shooting 61.1% from the field.

After playing for the Bullets, Moore joined the Hobart Devils in 1995. He also played for the Kuiyam Pride and Cairns Marlins of the Australian Basketball Association. After his stints in the ABA he returned to the NBL to play with the Cairns Taipans from 1999 to 2001.

== Recent years ==
Moore settled in Australia after his playing days. He has continued playing recreational basketball since his retirement, and has participated in the World Masters Games and Pan-Pacific Masters Games. He has been active in the community through his Big Feat program, promoting healthy lifestyles to school groups and other organisations.

== Personal life ==
Moore has five children with Nadia Taher; Mona Marie Moore, Jalen Frederick Moore, Camilia Radiya Moore, Tariq Yousuf Moore and Zane Adam Moore. He paid acknowledgment to his five children with Nadia in his 2024 interview. Before his marriage to Taher, Moore had a son, Archibald Smith, who is a former Australian Rules and Brisbane Lions footballer.

== Career statistics ==
Legend
GP	Games played	GS	Games started	MPG	Minutes per game
FG%	Field goal percentage	3P%	3-point field goal percentage	FT%	Free throw percentage
RPG	Rebounds per game	APG	Assists per game	SPG	Steals per game
BPG	Blocks per game	PPG	Points per game	**Bold**	Career high

=== NBA ===
==== Regular season ====
Year	Team	GP	GS	MPG	FG%	3P%	FT%	RPG	APG	SPG	BPG	PPG
1987–88	Denver	**7**	0	4.9	.292	–	**1.000**	**1.7**	**.7**	**.3**	**.1**	**2.9**
1987–88	Milwaukee	3	0	**5.3**	**.667**	–	.000	.7	.3	.0	.0	1.3
Career		10	0	5.0	.333	–	.750	1.4	.6	.2	.1	2.4
