= Alfredrick Hughes =

American basketball player (1962–2026)

Personal information
- Born: July 19, 1962 Chicago, Illinois, U.S.
- Died: May 1, 2026 (aged 63)
- Listed height: 6 ft 5 in (1.96 m)
- Listed weight: 215 lb (98 kg)

Career information
- High school: Paul Robeson (Chicago, Illinois)
- College: Loyola Chicago (1981–1985)
- NBA draft: 1985: 1st round, 14th overall pick
- Drafted by: San Antonio Spurs
- Playing career: 1985–1994
- Positions: Small forward, shooting guard
- Number: 6

Career history
- 1985–1986: San Antonio Spurs
- 1986–1987: Alno Fabriano
- 1987–1990: Chicago Illinois Express
- 1990–1991: Dayton Wings
- 1991–1992: Louisville Shooters
- 1992–1993: Fort Wayne Fury
- 1993: Iraklis Thessaloniki B.C.
- 1993: Quad City Thunder
- 1993: Montreal Dragons
- 1993–1994: Hartford Hellcats
- 1994: Rochester Renegade
- 1994: Grand Rapids Hoops

Career highlights
- Third-team All-American – AP, UPI (1985); 3× Horizon League Player of the Year (1983–1985); No. 21 retired by Loyola Ramblers
- Stats at NBA.com
- Stats at Basketball Reference

Alfredrick Hughes (July 19, 1962 – May 1, 2026) was an American basketball player who was selected by the San Antonio Spurs in the first round (14th pick overall) in the 1985 NBA draft. He played college basketball for the Loyola Ramblers.

== College career ==
After graduating from Chicago's Robeson High School, Hughes played college basketball at Loyola Chicago, where the 6 ft 5 in (1.96 m) shooting guard averaged 17.0 points per game as a freshman, 25.7 as a sophomore, 27.6 as a junior, and 26.3 as a senior. Hughes is Loyola's all-time leading scorer with 2,914 points, ranking 11th on the NCAA career scoring list following the 2025-26 season. Hughes also ended his college career as the all-time scoring leader in the Midwestern Collegiate Conference, now known as the Horizon League, holding this record until Detroit Mercy's Antoine Davis—who had the benefit of a fifth year of athletic eligibility due to COVID-19 disruptions—broke the mark in December 2022. He also holds the school record for most points scored in a game with 47 against Detroit (now Detroit Mercy) on February 5, 1985. Hughes was an All-American in 1985 and was a three-time Midwestern Collegiate Conference Player of the Year. His senior year he led the Ramblers to the Sweet 16 of the NCAA Tournament. Hughes' #21 is retired at Loyola and he is also a member of the school's Hall of Fame.

== Professional career ==
After being drafted by the Spurs, Hughes played only one NBA season, 1985–86, appearing in 68 games and averaging 5.2 ppg.

After being waived by the Spurs during training camp in 1986, Hughes went on the play eight more seasons of professional basketball both overseas in Italy, Belgium, Israel, and Greece, and in North American for the World Basketball League, Global Basketball Association, Continental Basketball Association, and National Basketball League.

== Death ==
Hughes died on May 1, 2026, aged 63. His death was announced by his alma mater, Loyola University.

== Career statistics ==
Legend
GP	Games played	GS	Games started	MPG	Minutes per game
FG%	Field goal percentage	3P%	3-point field goal percentage	FT%	Free throw percentage
RPG	Rebounds per game	APG	Assists per game	SPG	Steals per game
BPG	Blocks per game	PPG	Points per game	**Bold**	Career high

=== NBA ===
==== Regular season ====
Year	Team	GP	GS	MPG	FG%	3P%	FT%	RPG	APG	SPG	BPG	PPG
1985–86	San Antonio	68	0	12.7	.409	.176	.583	1.7	.9	.4	.1	5.2

==== Playoffs ====
Year	Team	GP	GS	MPG	FG%	3P%	FT%	RPG	APG	SPG	BPG	PPG
1986	San Antonio	3	0	6.0	.444	–	–	.0	.3	.3	.0	2.7
